= Index of DOS games (S) =

This is an index of DOS games.

This list has been split into multiple pages. Please use the Table of Contents to browse it.

| Title | Released | Developer(s) | Publisher(s) |
|---|---|---|---|
| Saboteur II | 1987 | Durell Software | Keypunch Software |
| Sign of the Sun | 1997 | International Computer Entertainment | Project Two Interactive |
| Sam & Max Hit the Road | 1993 | LucasArts | LucasArts |
| Sand Storm | 1992 | Pod Bay Enterprises | Personal Companion Software, MVP Software |
| Sango Fighter | 1993 | Panda Entertainment | Panda Entertainment |
| Sango Fighter 2 | 1995 | | Panda Entertainment |
| Santa Fe Mysteries: The Elk Moon Murder | 1996 | Activision | Activision |
| Santa Paravia en Fiumaccio | 1988 | Starsoft Development Laboratories | Keypunch Software |
| Sargon III | 1984 | | Hayden Software |
| Sargon 4 | 1988 | | Spinnaker Software |
| Sargon V: World Class Chess | 1992 | | Activision |
| Savage | 1989 | Probe Software | Microplay Software |
| Savage Warriors | 1995 | Atreid Concept SA | Mindscape |
| Scapeghost | 1989 | Level 9 | Level 9 |
| Scoop, The | 1988 | Telarium | Telarium |
| Scorched Earth | 1991 | Wendell Hicken | |
| Scorcher | 1996 | Zyrinx | Scavenger |
| Scrabble | 1991 | HVB | HVB |
| Screamer | 1995 | Graffiti | Virgin Interactive |
| Screamer 2 | 1996 | Milestone srl | Virgin Interactive |
| Screamer Rally | 1997 | Milestone srl | Virgin Interactive |
| ScubaVenture: The Search for Pirate's Treasure | 1993 | Apogee | Softdisk |
| S.D.I. | 1987 | Master Designer Software | Mindscape |
| Sea Dragon | 1983 | Adventure International | Adventure International |
| Sea Legends | 1996 | Ocean Software | GTE Entertainment |
| Seal Team | 1993 | | Electronic Arts |
| Search for the Titanic | 1989 | Codesmiths, IntraCorp | Capstone Software |
| Season of the Sakura | 1996 | JAST | JAST, JAST USA |
| Seastalker | 1984 | Infocom | Infocom |
| Seawolf | 1982 | International PC Owners | International PC Owners |
| Second Front: Germany Turns East | 1990 | Strategic Simulations | Strategic Simulations |
| Secret Agent | 1992-02-01 | Apogee Software | Apogee Software |
| Secret of Monkey Island, The | 1990 | Lucasfilm Games | Lucasfilm Games |
| Secret of the Silver Blades | 1990 | Strategic Simulations | Strategic Simulations |
| Secret Weapons of the Luftwaffe | 1991 | LucasFilm Games | LucasFilm Games |
| Seek and Destroy | 1996 | Vision Software | Safari Software |
| Sensible Golf | 1994 | Sensible Software | Virgin Interactive Entertainment |
| Sensible Soccer | 1992 | Sensible Software | Sensible Software |
| Sensible Soccer: European Champions: 92/93 Edition | 1992 | Sensible Software | Renegade Software |
| Sensible World of Soccer | 1994 | Sensible Software | Renegade Software |
| Sensible World of Soccer 95-96 | 1995 | Sensible Software | Sensible Software |
| Sensible World of Soccer: European Championship Edition | 1995 | Sensible Software | Renegade Software |
| Sensible World of Soccer 96-97 | 1996 | Sensible Software | Renegade Software |
| Sensible Soccer '98 | 1998 | Sensible Software | GT Interactive |
| Sentient | 1997 | Psygnosis | Psygnosis |
| Sentinel, The | 1989 | Geoff Crammond | Firebird Software |
| Sentinel Worlds I: Future Magic | 1988 | Binary Systems, Electronic Arts | Electronic Arts |
| Serf City: Life is Feudal | 1994 | Blue Byte | Blue Byte |
| Serpentine | 1982 | Broderbund | Broderbund |
| Settlers, The | 1994 | Blue Byte | Blue Byte |
| Settlers II: Veni, Vidi, Vici | 1996 | Blue Byte | Blue Byte |
| Settlers II (Gold Edition) | 1997 | Blue Byte | Blue Byte |
| Seven Cities of Gold, The | 1987 | Ozark Softscape | Electronic Arts |
| Seven Cities of Gold Commemorative Edition | 1993 | Interactive Designs | Electronic Arts |
| Seven Spirits of Ra, The | 1987 | | Sir-Tech |
| Sex Olympics | 1990 | Free Spirit Software | Free Spirit Software |
| Seymour Goes to Hollywood | 1991 | Big Red Software | Codemasters |
| Shade | 2000 | Andrew Plotkin | Andrew Plotkin |
| Shadowcaster | 1993 | Raven Software | Origin Systems |
| Shadowgate | 1988 | ICOM Simulations | Mindscape |
| Shadow Knights | 1990 | id Software | Softdisk |
| Shadowlands | 1992 | Teque London | Domark |
| Shadow of the Comet | 1993 | Chaosium | Infogrames |
| Shadow of Yserbius | 1992 | Sierra On-Line | Sierra On-Line |
| Shadow President | 1993 | DC True | DC True |
| Shadows of Cairn | 1994 | Ant Software | Masque Publishing |
| Shadows of Mordor, The | 1988 | Beam Software | Addison-Wesley Publishing Company |
| Shadow Sorcerer | 1991 | U.S. Gold | Strategic Simulations, U.S. Gold |
| Shadow Warrior | 1997 | 3D Realms | GT Interactive |
| Shamus | 1984 | William Mataga | Synapse Software |
| Shanghai | 1986 | Activision | Activision |
| Shanghai II: Dragon's Eye | 1990 | Activision | Activision |
| Shannara | 1995 | Legend Entertainment | Legend Entertainment |
| Shard of Spring | 1986 | Strategic Simulations | Strategic Simulations |
| Shattered Steel | 1996 | BioWare | BioWare |
| Sherlock: The Riddle of the Crown Jewels | 1987 | Challenge Inc. | Infocom |
| Sherlock Holmes: Consulting Detective | 1991 | ICOM Simulations | ICOM Simulations |
| Sherlock Holmes: Consulting Detective Vol. II | 1992 | ICOM Simulations | ICOM Simulations |
| Sherlock Holmes: Consulting Detective Vol. III | 1993 | ICOM Simulations | ICOM Simulations |
| Shinobi | 1989 | Micromosaics Productions | Sega |
| Shogun | | | |
| Shrak | 1997 | Quantum Axcess | Quantum Axcess |
| Shufflepuck Cafe | 1989 | Domark | Ubisoft, Broderbund |
| Shuttle | 1992 | Vektor Grafix | Virgin Interactive |
| Sid & Al's Incredible Toons | 1993 | Sierra On-Line | Sierra On-Line |
| Sid Meier's Civilization | 1991 | MPS Labs | MicroProse |
| Sid Meier's Colonization | 1994 | MicroProse | MicroProse |
| Sid Meier's Pirates! | 1994 | MicroProse | Kixx |
| Sid Meier's Covert Action | 1990 | MicroProse | MicroProse |
| Sid Meier's Railroad Tycoon | 1990 | MicroProse | MicroProse |
| Sid Meier's Railroad Tycoon Deluxe | 1993 | MicroProse | MicroProse |
| Sidewinder | 1988 | Synergistic Software | Arcadia Systems |
| Siege | 1992 | Mindcraft | |
| Sierra Championship Boxing | 1985 | Evryware | Sierra On-Line |
| Silent Hunter | 1996 | Aeon Electronic Entertainment | Strategic Simulations |
| Silent Hunter Patrol Disk | 1996 | Aeon Electronic Entertainment, Strategic Simulations | Strategic Simulations |
| Silent Hunter Patrol Disk#2 | 1997 | Aeon Electronic Entertainment, Strategic Simulations | Strategic Simulations |
| Silent Hunter Commander's Edition | 1997 | Aeon Electronic Entertainment, Strategic Simulations | Strategic Simulations |
| Silent Service | 1986 | MicroProse | MicroProse |
| Silent Service II | 1990 | MicroProse | MicroProse |
| Silicon Dreams | 1986 | Level 9 Computing | Rainbird Software |
| Silpheed | 1988 | Game Arts Co. | Sierra On-Line |
| Silverball | 1993 | Digital Extremes, Epic MegaGames | MicroLeague |
| Silverload | 1996 | Millennium Interactive | Psygnosis |
| SimAnt: The Electronic Ant Colony | 1991-12-06 | Maxis | Maxis |
| SimCity | 1989 | Maxis | Broderbund |
| SimCity Enhanced CD-ROM | 1993 | Maxis | Maxis, Interplay Entertainment |
| SimCity Graphics Set 1: Ancient Cities | 1991 | Maxis | Maxis |
| SimCity Graphics Set 2: Future Cities | 1991 | Maxis | Maxis |
| SimCity: Terrain Editor | 1989 | Maxis | Infogrames |
| SimCity 2000 | 1993 | Maxis | Maxis |
| SimCity 2000 Urban Renewal Kit | 1994 | Maxis | Maxis |
| SimEarth: The Living Planet | 1990 | Maxis | Maxis |
| SimFarm | 1993 | Maxis | Mindscape |
| SimHealth | 1994 | Thinking Tools | Maxis |
| SimIsle: Missions in the Rainforest | 1995 | Intelligent Games | Maxis |
| SimLife | 1992 | Maxis | Maxis |
| Simon the Sorcerer | 1993 | Adventure Soft | Adventure Soft |
| Simon the Sorcerer II: The Lion, the Wizard and the Wardrobe | 1995 | Adventure Soft | Adventure Soft |
| Simpsons Arcade Game, The | 1991 | Novotrade International | Konami |
| Simpsons: Bart's House of Weirdness | 1992 | Distinctive Software | Konami |
| Simpsons: Bart vs. the Space Mutants | 1991 | Imagineering | Acclaim Entertainment, Ocean Software |
| Sinbad and the Throne of the Falcon | 1987 | Cinemaware | Cinemaware |
| Sink or Swim | 1993 | Zeppelin Games | Zeppelin Games |
| Sito Pons 500cc Grand Prix | 1990 | Zigurat | Zigurat |
| Skate or Die | 1988 | Electronic Arts | Electronic Arts |
| Ski or Die | 1990 | Electronic Arts | Electronic Arts |
| SkiFree | 1991 | Chris Pirih | Microsoft |
| Skull & Crossbones | 1991 | Domark | Domark |
| SkyChase | 1990 | Maxis | Broderbund |
| Skyfox II: The Cygnus Conflict | 1987 | Dynamix | Electronic Arts |
| Skynet | 1996 | Bethesda Softworks | Bethesda Softworks |
| SkyRoads | 1993 | Bluemoon | Creative Dimensions |
| SkyRoads Xmas Special | 1993 | Bluemoon | Creative Dimensions |
| Sky Runner | 1986 | Cascade | |
| Sky Shark | 1988 | Banana Development Corporation | Taito |
| Slam City with Scottie Pippen | 1995 | Digital Pictures | Digital Pictures |
| Slater & Charlie Go Camping | 1993-05-19 | Sierra On-Line | |
| Sleeping Gods Lie | 1989 | Empire Interactive | Empire Interactive |
| Sleepwalker | 1993 | CTA Developments | Ocean Software |
| Sleuth | 1983 | Norland Software | Norland Software |
| Slipstream 5000 | 1995 | The Software Refinery | Gremlin Interactive |
| Slordax: The Unknown Enemy | 1991 | Softdisk | Softdisk |
| Snack Attack II | 1982 | Funtastic | Funtastic |
| Snipes | 1982 | SuperSet Software | SuperSet Software |
| Snood | 1999 | David M. Dobson | Snood World |
| Soccer Kid | 1994 | Krisalis Software | General Admission Software |
| SODA Off-Road Racing | 1997 | Software Allies | Sierra Entertainment |
| Softporn Adventure | 1991 | Chuck Benton | On-Line Systems |
| Soko-Ban | 1984 | ASCII Corporation, Thinking Rabbit | Spectrum Holobyte |
| Solar Winds | 1993 | Stone Interactive Media | Epic MegaGames |
| Soldiers at War | 1998 | Random Games | Strategic Simulations |
| Solitaire Royale | 1987 | Software Resources International | Spectrum Holobyte |
| Solitaire's Journey | 1992 | Quantum Quality Productions | Quantum Quality Productions |
| Solo Flight | 1983 | MicroProse | MicroProse |
| Solomon's Key | 1988 | Tecmo | U.S. Gold |
| Sołtys | 1995 | L.K. Avalon | L.K. Avalon |
| Sons of Liberty | 1987 | Strategic Simulations | Strategic Simulations |
| Sopwith | 1984 | David L. Clark | BMB Compuscience |
| Sopwith 2 | 1985 | David L. Clark | BMB Compuscience |
| Sopwith: The Author's Edition | 2000 | David L. Clark | BMB Compuscience |
| Sorcerer | 1984 | Infocom | Infocom |
| Sorcerer Lord | 1987 | Personal Software Services | Personal Software Services |
| Sorcerian | 1990 | Nihon Falcom Corporation | Nihon Falcom Corporation, Takeru Soft, Sierra Entertainment |
| Space: 1889 | 1990 | Paragon Software | Paragon Software |
| Space Ace | 1994 | Don Bluth Studios, RDI Video Systems | ReadySoft |
| Space Crusade | 1995 | Gremlin Interactive | Gremlin Interactive |
| Space Dude | 1994 | Evryware | FormGen |
| Space Harrier | 1989 | AM R&D Dept.#2 | SEGA Enterprises |
| Space Hulk: Vengeance of the Blood Angels | 1996 | Electronic Arts | Electronic Arts |
| Space Pirates | 1994 | American Laser Games | American Laser Games |
| Space Quest I: The Sarien Encounter | 1986 | Sierra On-Line | Sierra On-Line |
| Space Quest II: Vohaul's Revenge | 1987 | Sierra On-Line | Sierra On-Line |
| Space Quest III: The Pirates of Pestulon | 1989 | Sierra On-Line | Sierra On-Line |
| Space Quest IV: Roger Wilco and the Time Rippers | 1991 | Sierra On-Line | Sierra On-Line |
| Space Quest V: The Next Mutation | 1993 | Dynamix | Sierra On-Line |
| Space Quest 6: The Spinal Frontier | 1995 | Sierra On-Line | Sierra On-Line |
| Space Rogue | 1989 | Origin Systems | Origin Systems |
| Space Station Oblivion | 1988 | Incentive Software | Epyx |
| Space Strike | 1982 | Michael Abrash | Datamost |
| Spacewrecked | 1991 | | Gremlin, Konami |
| Spear of Destiny | 1992 | id Software | FormGen |
| Special Forces | 1992 | Sleepless Knights | MicroProse |
| Spectre | 1992 | Peninsula Gameworks | Velocity Development |
| Spectre VR | 1993 | Velocity Development | Velocity Development |
| Speedball | 1988 | Bitmap Brothers | Image Works |
| Speedball 2: Brutal Deluxe | 1990 | Bitmap Brothers | Image Works |
| Speed Demons | 1999 | EMG | Microïds |
| Speed Haste | 1995 | NoriaWorks Entertainment | Friendware |
| Speed Racer in The Challenge of Racer X | 1992 | Accolade | Accolade |
| Spellbreaker | 1985 | Infocom | Infocom |
| Spellcasting 101: Sorcerers Get All The Girls | 1990 | Legend Entertainment | Legend Entertainment |
| Spellcasting 201: The Sorcerer's Appliance | 1991 | Legend Entertainment | Legend Entertainment |
| Spellcasting 301: Spring Break | 1992 | Legend Entertainment | Legend Entertainment |
| SpellCraft: Aspects of Valor | 1992 | Asciiware | Broderbund |
| Spellcross | 1998 | Cauldron Ltd. | JRC Interactive |
| Spelljammer: Pirates of Realmspace | 1992 | Cybertech | Strategic Simulations |
| Spiderbot | 1988 | Addictive Games | Epyx |
| Spider-Man | 1985 | Adventure International | Load'N'Go Software |
| Spirit of Adventure | 1991 | Attic Entertainment Software | Starbyte Software |
| Spirit of Excalibur | 1990 | Virgin Games | Synergistic Software |
| Spiritual Warfare | 1993 | Wisdom Tree | Wisdom Tree |
| Spirou | 1996 | Infogrames | Infogrames |
| Spitfire Ace | 1984 | MicroProse | MicroProse |
| Sporting Triangles | 1989 | CDS Software | CDS Software |
| Spot | 1990 | Virgin Mastertronic | Virgin Mastertronic |
| SpurguX | 1987 | Petri Niska | Self-published |
| Spycraft: The Great Game | 1996 | Activision | Activision |
| Spy Hunter | 1984 | Bally Midway | Bally Midway |
| Spy Snatcher | 1991 | Topologika | Topologika |
| Spy vs. Spy III: Arctic Antics | 1988 | First Star Software | First Star Software |
| Spy Who Loved Me, The | 1990 | The Kremlin | Domark |
| SSN-21 Seawolf | 1994 | John W. Ratcliff | Electronic Arts |
| StarBlade | 1990 | Silmarils | Silmarils |
| Starbusters | 1990 | Steve Boerner | |
| Star Command: Revolution | 1997 | Toys for Bob | Accolade |
| Star Control | 1990 | Toys for Bob | Accolade |
| Star Control II | 1992 | Toys for Bob | Accolade |
| Star Control 3 | 1996 | Legend Entertainment | Accolade |
| Starcross | 1982 | Infocom | Infocom |
| Star Crusader | 1994 | Take-Two Interactive | Take-Two Interactive |
| Stardust | 1995 | Bloodhouse | Bloodhouse |
| Star Fleet I: The War Begins | 1985 | Cygnus Multimedia | Cygnus Multimedia |
| Star Fleet II: Krellan Commander | 1989 | Interstel Corporation | Interstel Corporation |
| Starflight | 1986 | Binary Systems, Electronic Arts | Electronic Arts |
| Starflight 2: Trade Routes of the Cloud Nebula | 1989 | Binary Systems | Electronic Arts |
| Stargate | 1983 | Atari | Atarisoft |
| Star General | 1996 | Catware | Strategic Simulations |
| Starglider | 1986 | Argonaut Software | Rainbird Software |
| Starglider 2 | 1988 | Argonaut Software | Argonaut Software |
| Stargoose | 1988 | Logotron | Logotron |
| Stargunner | 1996 | Apogee Software | Apogee Software |
| Star Legions | 1992 | Supernova Creations | Mindcraft |
| Starlord | 1993 | Microprose | Microprose |
| Starquake | 1988 | ShareData | Bubble Bus Software |
| Star Rangers | 1995 | Interactive Magic | Interactive Magic |
| Star Reach | 1994-12-22 | Interplay Entertainment | Interplay Entertainment |
| Star Saga | 1988, 1989 | Masterplay Publishing | Masterplay Publishing |
| Star Trek: 25th Anniversary | 1992 | Interplay Entertainment | Interplay Entertainment |
| Star Trek: Deep Space Nine - Harbinger | 1996 | Stormfront Studios | Viacom New Media |
| Star Trek: First Contact | 1988 | Simon & Schuster Interactive | Simon & Schuster Interactive |
| Star Trek: Judgment Rites | 1993 | Interplay Entertainment | Interplay Entertainment |
| Star Trek: The Kobayashi Alternative | 1985 | Micromosaics | Simon & Schuster Interactive |
| Star Trek: The Next Generation - A Final Unity | 1995 | Spectrum HoloByte | MicroProse |
| Star Trek: The Next Generation Trivia | 1990 | Micro F/X Software | Micro F/X Software |
| Star Trek: The Promethean Prophecy | 1986 | TRANS Fiction Systems | Simon & Schuster Interactive |
| Star Trek: The Rebel Universe | 1988 | Simon & Schuster Interactive | Simon & Schuster Interactive |
| Star Wars | 1988 | Vector Grafix | Broderbund |
| Star Wars Chess | 1993 | Software Toolworks | Software Toolworks |
| Star Wars: Dark Forces | 1995 | LucasArts | LucasArts |
| Star Wars: Rebel Assault | 1993 | LucasArts | LucasArts |
| Star Wars: Rebel Assault II - The Hidden Empire | 1995 | LucasArts | LucasArts |
| Star Wars: Return of the Jedi | 1988 | Domark | Domark |
| Star Wars: TIE Fighter | 1994 | LucasArts | Softgold |
| Star Wars: X-Wing | 1993 | LucasArts | LucasArts |
| Stationfall | 1987 | Infocom | Infocom |
| Steel Panthers | 1995 | Strategic Simulations | Mindscape |
| Steel Panthers | 1996-11 | Strategic Simulations, Novastar Game Co. | Strategic Simulations |
| Steel Panthers II: Modern Battles | 1996 | Strategic Simulations | Mindscape |
| Steel Thunder | 1989 | NovaLogic | Accolade |
| Steg the Slug | 1992 | The Big Red Software Company Ltd. | Codemasters |
| Stellar 7 | 1990 | Dynamix | Dynamix |
| Super Mario Bros. & Friends: When I Grow Up | 1992 | Brian A. Rice, Inc. | Merit Software |
| Stonekeep | 1995 | Interplay Productions | Interplay Productions |
| Storm | 1987 | Mastertronic | Mastertronic |
| Storm Across Europe | 1990 | Raffaele Cecco | Hewson Consultants |
| Stormlord | 1989 | RazorSoft | Hewson Consultants |
| Storm Master | 1992 | Silmarils | Silmarils |
| Street Fighter | 1988 | Tiertex | U.S. Gold |
| Street Fighter II: The World Warrior | 1992 | U.S. Gold | U.S. Gold |
| Street Racer | 1997 | Vivid Image | Ubisoft |
| Street Rod | 1989 | P.Z.Karen Co. Development Group, Logical Design Works | California Dreams |
| Street Rod 2: The Next Generation | 1991 | P.Z.Karen Co. Development Group, Logical Design Works | California Dreams |
| Street Sports Baseball | 1987 | Epyx | Epyx |
| Street Sports Basketball | 1987 | Epyx | U.S. Gold |
| Strider | 1989 | U.S. Gold | U.S. Gold |
| Strife | 1996-05-16 | Rogue Entertainment | Velocity Inc. |
| Strike Aces | 1990 | Vektor Grafix | Accolade |
| Strike Commander | 1993 | Origin Systems | Electronic Arts |
| Strike Commander: Tactical Operations | 1993 | Origin Systems | Electronic Arts |
| Strike Fleet | 1987 | LucasArts | Electronic Arts |
| Striker | 1992 | Rage Software | Rage Software |
| Striker '96 | 1996 | Rage Software | Acclaim Entertainment |
| Strip Blackjack | 1986 | Tor Underwood | Micro Magic |
| Stronghold | 1993 | Stormfront Studios | Strategic Simulations |
| S.T.U.N. Runner | 1990 | Domark | Domark |
| Stunt Driver | 1990 | Sphere, Inc. | Spectrum Holobyte |
| Stunt Island | 1992 | The Assembly Line | Disney Interactive |
| Stunts | 1990 | Distinctive Software | Broderbund, Mindscape |
| Stunt Track Racer | 1989 | MicroStyle | Microprose, MicroPlay |
| Styx | 1983 | Windmill Software | Windmill Software |
| Su-27 Flanker | 1996 | Eagle Dynamics | Strategic Simulations |
| Sub Battle Simulator | 1987 | Digital Illusions | Epyx |
| Submarine | 1989-04 | | Softdisk |
| Sub Mission | 1987 | Tom Snyder Productions | Mindscape |
| Subtrade | 1994 | Century Interactive | Boeder Software |
| Subwar 2050 | 1993 | Particle Systems | MicroProse Software |
| Summer Games II | 1986 | Epyx | Epyx |
| Summoning, The | 1992 | Event Horizon Software | Strategic Simulations |
| Supaplex | 1991 | Think!Ware Development | Digital Integration Ltd. |
| Superbike Challenge | 1995 | Lankhor | Domark, Time Warner Interactive |
| Super C | 1990 | Distinctive Software | Konami |
| Supercars International | 1996-07-31 | Magnetic Fields | The Hit Squad |
| Super Cauldron | 1992 | Titus Software | Titus Software |
| Super Fighter | 1993 | C&E | C&E |
| Superfrog | 1993 | Team17 | Team17 |
| Super Hang-On | 1987 | Quicksilver Software | Data East |
| Superhero League of Hoboken | 1994 | Legend Entertainment | Legend Entertainment |
| Super Huey UH-IX | 1988 | Cosmi Corporation | Cosmi Corporation |
| SuperKarts | 1995 | Manic Media | Virgin Interactive |
| Super 3D Noah's Ark | 1994 | Wisdom Tree | Wisdom Tree |
| Supernova | 1987 | Apogee Software | Apogee Software |
| Super Off Road | 1990 | Leland Corporation | Virgin Mastertronic |
| Super Pac-Man | 1988 | Beam Software | Beam Software |
| Super Solvers: Gizmos & Gadgets | 1993 | The Learning Company | The Learning Company |
| Super Solvers: Midnight Rescue! | 1989 | The Learning Company | The Learning Company |
| Super Solvers: OutNumbered! | 1990 | The Learning Company | The Learning Company |
| Super Stardust | 1996 | Housemarque | GameTek |
| Superstar Ice Hockey | 1987 | DesignStar Consultants | Mindscape |
| Super Street Fighter II: The New Challengers | 1996 | Rozner Labs | Capcom |
| Super Street Fighter II Turbo | 1995 | Eurocom | Gametek |
| Super-VGA Harrier | 1993 | Simis | Domark |
| Super Zaxxon | 1984 | Sega | Sega |
| Super ZZT | 1992 | Epic MegaGames | Epic MegaGames |
| Supremacy: Your Will Be Done | 1991 | Probe Software | Melbourne House |
| Suspect | 1984 | Infocom | Infocom |
| Suspended | 1983 | Infocom | Infocom |
| Swing | 1997 | Software 2000 | Software 2000 |
| SWIV 3D | 1996 | SCi | SCi |
| Sword of Aragon | 1989 | Strategic Simulations | Strategic Simulations |
| Sword of Honour | 1992 | Dynafield | Prestige |
| Sword of the Samurai | 1989 | MicroProse | MicroProse |
| Swords of Xeen | 1995 | Catware | New World Computing |
| Syndicate | 1993 | Bullfrog Productions | Electronic Arts |
| Syndicate: American Revolt | 1993 | Bullfrog Productions | Electronic Arts |
| Syndicate Plus | 1994 | Bullfrog Productions | Bullfrog Productions |
| Syndicate Wars | 1996 | Bullfrog Productions | Electronic Arts |
| Synnergist | 1996 | Vicarious Visions, Inc. | 21st Century Entertainment |
| System Shock | 1994-09-23 | Looking Glass Studios | Origin Systems, Electronic Arts |
