= World Rally (video game) =

1993 video game

- Developer: Zigurat Software
- Publishers: ESP/JP: Gaelco, Sigma; NA: Atari Games
- Programmers: Carlos Granados; Fernando Rada
- Artist: Jorge Granados
- Composer: Joan Sanmarti
- Series: World Rally
- Platform: Arcade
- Release: ESP/JP: July 1993; NA: August 1993
- Genre: Racing
- Modes: Single-player, multiplayer

World Rally (Note: Also known as World Rally Championship at the title screen.) is a 1993 racing arcade video game developed by Zigurat Software and published by Gaelco in Spain, Sigma in Japan and Atari Games in North America. Themed around rallying, the game pit players with races across various locations under a short time limit to qualify for the next course.

World Rally was developed over the course of two years by most of the same team of previous works at Zigurat Software such as Carlos Sainz: World Rally Championship, initially intended to be a racing game about the World Rally Championship featuring Spanish rally driver Carlos Sainz before he changed teams from Toyota to Lancia, prompting the staff drop Sainz' likeness from the project before launch. The title proved to be a success for Gaelco, managing to sell 23,000 arcade units in Europe and earning an award from Gamest magazine. In 1995, a sequel titled World Rally 2: Twin Racing was released by Gaelco, but garnered less success than its predecessor.

== Gameplay ==
Gameplay screenshot

World Rally is a top-down rally racing game reminiscent of Thrash Rally and Carlos Sainz: World Rally Championship, where players observe from above and race across various countries by participating in a single race under a sixty-second time limit. Every location, composed of three stages each, has its own weather conditions and hazards that change how the car is controlled through the track, as well as shortcuts to gain time advantage. Players control a Toyota Celica GT-Four rally car. A direction indicator appears during gameplay, allowing players to known about an incoming turn. Players move into the next course by completing the race under sixty seconds, but failing to do so results in a game over screen unless players insert more credits into the arcade machine to continue playing. A second player can also participate by alternating turns.

== Development ==
World Rally was created by most of the same team that worked on previous projects at Zigurat Software such as Carlos Sainz: World Rally Championship, with members of the creation team recounting the project's development process and history through multiple publications. Zigurat was contacted by Gaelco after the release of Carlos Sainz for microcomputers to work on an arcade game. Jorge Granados stated that the team wanted to make a racing game about Carlos Sainz and the World Rally Championship. They opted for an isometric perspective, their first attempt at this graphical style. The team's Fernando Rada said that coding the perspective was a major challenge, although it was made simpler by the new technology that the team was working with. Previously they had coded only for the 8-bit Z80 processor, but switched to the 16-bit 68000 for World Rally, programming the game in assembly. Rada said that the new setup was "much easier" to work with.

Near the end of development when World Rally was ready for testing, Sainz changed teams from Toyota to Lancia. Granados later said that the game had been in production for almost two years, and that the technical chore of changing its assets to fit the new branding would have been "crazy". As a result, Zigurat instead chose to drop Sainz from the game. Granados later said: "What we did was leave everything the same, and on the cover where Carlos Sainz appeared, we planted a gigantic helmet". The car, which was a Toyota Celica GT-Four, was a scale model created and painted by the team before being digitized into the game, using 360 photography.

== Release ==
World Rally was first released in Spain and Japan by Gaelco and Sigma in July 1993, before being launched in North America as a kit by Atari Games on August of the same year. Prior to its launch, it was first playtested at the Sants neighborhood in Barcelona. The game was distributed on two variations; a standard upright variant and a deluxe variant. In a 1995 interview with Spanish magazine Hobby Hi-Tech, Jorge Granados claimed Zigurat Software were in talks with Sony about a potential conversion of the title for PlayStation, but this version was never released. It became notable in recent years due to being extremely difficult to play on emulators like MAME, as the arcade hardware implemented an advanced anti-piracy system until Gaelco co-founder Javier Valero provided unencrypted keys for the PCB in 2008 at a Spanish gaming conference, allowing it to be emulated and played. Gaelco later made its ROM image available as freeware. World Rally is planned to be included as part of the Gaelco Arcade 1 compilation for Evercade, marking its first console debut.

== Reception and legacy ==
Reception

Review score
Publication	Score
Game Power	75%

Award
Publication	Award
Gamest (1994)	Annual Hit Game 75th

While Gaelco's previous titles Big Karnak and Thunder Hoop had been commercially successful, researchers Manuel Garin and Víctor Manuel Martínez cited World Rally as the studio's breakthrough title across Europe, where it attained "mass success". The game sold around 23,000 units in Europe and according to Jorge Granados, it achieved similar response worldwide. It remained Zigurat's biggest hit ever by 2014. Summarizing World Rally's performance, Granados said that the title made a lot of money for the studio.

Italian magazine Computer+Videogiochi praised its visuals. Electronic Gaming Monthly regarded the game as "endurance racing at its finest". In Japan, Game Machine listed the game as the twelfth most popular arcade game of September 1993. RePlay also reported the title as the third most popular arcade game at the time. Play Meter listed it as the forty-eighth most popular arcade game at the time as well. French magazine Consoles + regarded the gameplay positively as "exemplary". French publication Joypad also gave it a positive outlook. Gamest awarded it in 1994 with the 75th "Annual Hit Game" prize. In recent years, it has been played in tournaments on gaming-dedicated festivals in Spain and has since gained a cult following. In a retrospective, Top Gear commended the game's exceptional realism for its era, with particular emphasis placed on the superior quality of its sound effects in comparison to other arcade games available at that time.

A sequel titled World Rally 2: Twin Racing was released in 1995 by Gaelco, but proved less popular than World Rally. Santa Ragione designer Pietro Righi Riva stated that World Rally served as inspiration for the 2016 title Wheels of Aurelia.
