= Sandstorm (disambiguation) =

A sandstorm is a phenomenon caused by strong wind and sand or dust, characterized by a high proportion of sand in the particles blown by the winds.

Sandstorm may refer to:

== Games and computing ==
- Sandstorm (vehicle), a robotic vehicle developed by Carnegie Mellon for the DARPA Grand Challenge race
- Sandstorm (Transformers), several characters in the Transformers toyline
- Sandstorm (Dungeons & Dragons), a 3.5 edition Dungeons & Dragons sourcebook
- Sandstorm (video game), a 1992 action game
- SANDstorm hash, a cryptographic hash function
- Sandstorm: Pirate Wars, a 2016 video game

== Companies ==
- Sandstorm Enterprises, a computer security tools company in Massachusetts
- The Sandstorm report, Price Waterhouse's report that led to the closure of the Bank of Credit and Commerce International in 1991

== Film, television and theatre ==
- Sandstorm (1982 film), a 1982 Algerian film
- Sand Storm (2016 film), a 2016 Israeli film
- Bawandar, a 2000 Indian film (English title: The Sand Storm)
- The Sandstorm, a 2004 play by Sean Huze

== Music ==
- "Sandstorm" (instrumental), a 1999 trance instrumental by Darude
- "Sandstorm" (Cast song), a 1995 song on Cast's debut album, All Change
- "Sandstorm", a song on Rasmus Seebach's 2013 album, Ingen kan love dig i morgen
- "Sandstorm", a song by Level 42 on their 1982 album The Early Tapes (also known as Strategy)
- "Sandstorm", a song by La Bionda (1978)

== Other ==
- Sandstorm, a character from the Warriors novel series
