= Midnight Rescue! =

1989 video game

- Developer: The Learning Company
- Publisher: The Learning Company
- Platforms: MS-DOS, Mac
- Release: NA: 1989
- Genre: Educational
- Mode: Single-player

Midnight Rescue! is an educational entertainment video game created by The Learning Company and published in 1989 for Windows and Mac. It is designed to strengthen the reading and critical thinking skills of children grades three to five.

Midnight Rescue is a side-scrolling adventure game whose objective is to prevent a school from disappearing by midnight by deducing Morty Maxwell's hiding place. To do this, the player must roam the halls of Shady Glen School and piece together clues received by reading articles and correctly answering questions about them. The game contains a plethora of articles ranging from fictional character diary entries to excerpts from famous works of literature.

The game is part of several of the Learning Company's later releases including their "Super Solvers Super Learning Collection" and "Super Solvers Reading Ages 9–12". In 1995, the game was re-released on CD-ROM.

== Gameplay ==
Walking through the halls of the school, the player is likely to run into one of the rogue robots like this one, who is modeled after an upside-down can of spray paint.

Midnight Rescue! is a side-scrolling educational game whose objective is to stop Morty Maxwell (also known as the Master of Mischief), a common antagonist of the Learning Company's Super Solvers series and Treasure series, from using his robots to paint the school invisible by midnight. To do this, the player must deduce which of the robots he is hiding in by comparing photographs taken of robots to clues obtained by reading passages left around the school and answering questions about them within nine minutes.

During the course of the game, the player will be attacked by Morty's robot henchmen (Buffo, Lectro, Pogo, Rollo, and Turbo), who take the forms of types of paintbrushes. When they appear they will either attempt to crash into the player or launch projectiles like marbles or pies at him. This will cause the player to lose either time (45 seconds) or film (one per crash). If the player uses their camera to take a picture of the robot before this happens, however, the robot will run away, and the player will learn characteristics about that robot. These photos hold information that can be used to identify the robot that Morty is hiding in.

When the player has all four clues and photographs of each robot, they must decide which robot they think the Master of Mischief is hiding in. The player must compare the clues gathered from answered questions to photographs that reveal characteristics about the robots. If the player correctly guesses the robot the Master of Mischief is in, they get a bonus score based on film and the time remaining. This will be added to the total lifetime score. If the player guesses incorrectly or fails to gather enough information by midnight, one of the robots will cover the player with invisible paint, and the player loses the game. Losing a game does not affect the lifetime score.

Each time the player completes the game, their lifetime score increases (although in the 1995 version, the player receives the points they earned if they guess wrong). At certain score amounts, the player will advance a rank and the game becomes more difficult. At higher ranks, more photographs are required of each robot, the robots move faster, some of the articles posted around the school do not contain clues, and the readings become more difficult.

== Development ==
=== Super Solvers series ===
The Super Solvers series are computer games released by the Learning Company that have educational and entertainment qualities. Midnight Rescue! is the first program of the series to be released. Other programs in this series include OutNumbered!, Spellbound!, and Gizmos and Gadgets! among others.

Midnight Rescue! contains over 200 reading sections that consist of character written letters and diary entries as well as excerpts from famous novels. There are over 400 possible questions for these reading sections, meaning that a passage will not always have the same question at the end. To help build vocabulary, Midnight Rescue! provides definitions and, in many cases, pronunciations of over 500 words. By making the player choose the correct robot, the game also helps build deductive reasoning skills.

=== Music ===
In lieu of original scores, Midnight Rescue! plays famous classical compositions in the background during gameplay. The music heard at the beginning of the game and in the hallways of the school is The Sorcerer's Apprentice by Paul Dukas. The music heard inside rooms is "In the Hall of the Mountain King" by Edvard Grieg from Henrik Ibsen's Peer Gynt.

=== Later versions ===
In 1995, a more Windows-friendly version with slightly enhanced graphics and sound was released on CD-ROM.

Midnight Rescue! was later released under the name "Super Solvers Super Learning Collection!" with both OutNumbered! and Spellbound! in one of the first bundle packages ever released. Later, it was merged with Spellbound! and released under the name "Super Solvers Reading Ages 9–12".

== Reception ==
Reception

Review scores
Publication	Score
Abandonia	4.0 out of 5
MobyGames	Windows: 2.0 out of 5 Windows 3.x: 2.9 out of 5 Macintosh: 2.0 out of 5

Awards
Publication	Award
Family Fun Magazine and Prodigy	1993 Kids' Choice Software Award
Software Publisher's Association Awards	Best Home Learning Product
Home of the Underdogs	Top Dog Award

Midnight Rescue! was one of the first successful combinations of educational and entertaining games. It has received lukewarm to positive reviews. Users at Abandonia gave it a rating of four out of five. A review at Home of the Underdogs gave Midnight Rescue! two thumbs up and their Top Dog Award due to the strength of its ability to teach and entertain at the same time.
