= Outnumbered =

Outnumbered may refer to:

- Outnumbered (British TV series), a 2007–2024 British comedy series that aired on the BBC
- Outnumbered (American TV program), a 2014 news discussion program that airs on Fox News Channel
- OutNumbered!, a 1990 educational computer game published by The Learning Company
- "Outnumbered" (song), a 2019 single by Irish singer Dermot Kennedy
