= Moonlight Madness =

Moonlight Madness may refer to:

- Moonlight Madness (Teri DeSario album), 1979
- Moonlight Madness (Barry Gibb album), an unreleased album repackaged as the soundtrack for the 1988 film Hawks
- Moonlight Madness (video game), a 1986 computer game for the ZX Spectrum
- Moonlight Madness, an occasional sale happening until 2011 at Zellers stores
