= Hotu =

Hotu may refer to:

- Hotu Matu'a, legendary first settler of Easter Island
- The Yellow River Map

The acronym HOTU may stand for:

- Home of the Underdogs, an abandonware website
- Neverwinter Nights: Hordes of the Underdark, an expansion pack for the computer game Neverwinter Nights
