= Carlos Sainz: World Rally Championship =

1990 video game

- Developers: Zigurat Software; Arcadia Software
- Publisher: Zigurat Software
- Producers: Fernando Rada; Jorge Granados
- Programmers: José Miguel Saiz; Manuel Rosas
- Artist: José A. Carrera Merino
- Platforms: Amstrad CPC, MS-DOS, MSX, ZX Spectrum
- Release: ESP: December 3, 1990
- Genre: Racing
- Mode: Single-player

Carlos Sainz: World Rally Championship (Note: Spanish: Carlos Sainz: Campeonato del Mundo de Rallies) is a 1990 racing video game co-developed by the Spanish companies Zigurat Software (previously known as Made in Spain) and Arcadia Software, and published by Zigurat for Amstrad CPC, MS-DOS, MSX and ZX Spectrum. Featuring Spanish rally driver Carlos Sainz and themed around rallying, the game pit players with races across various locations to qualify for the next course in the World Rally Championship and modify characteristics of the Toyota Celica to accommodate each courses.

Carlos Sainz: World Rally Championship was created in conjunction with Sito Pons 500cc Grand Prix by most of the same team at Zigurat who worked on licensed sports titles such as Paris-Dakar (1988) and Emilio Sanchez Vicario Grand Slam with co-developer Arcadia, serving as their final release prior to abandoning the video game industry. The game originated during a meeting between Zigurat and Arcadia to discuss future projects, where various ideas were pitched. The idea of creating an accurate rally simulator came from motorsports being a hobby among Zigurat staff, with the programmers finding rally as a spectacular discipline and fitting due to graphic and dynamic possibilities. Zigurat hired Sainz, who had yet to become a world champion at the time, and development of the project started afterwards.

Carlos Sainz: World Rally Championship proved to be a success for Zigurat and garnered positive reception from critics across all platforms since its release; praise was given to the addictive gameplay, sense of speed, controls and sound but other reviewers felt mixed in regards to the graphics and difficulty, while the limited technical complexity was criticized. Conversions for Amiga and Atari ST were planned but never released. After its launch, Zigurat was contacted by Gaelco to work on an arcade game based on the World Rally Championship featuring Sainz before he changed teams from Toyota to Lancia near the end of development, being ultimately reworked and released as World Rally (1993).

== Gameplay ==
Amstrad CPC version screenshot

Carlos Sainz: World Rally Championship is a top-down rally racing game reminiscent of Paris-Dakar (1988), where players observe from above and race as Spanish rally driver Carlos Sainz driving the Toyota Celica Turbo 4WD across locations conforming the World Rally Championship such as Portugal, Acropolis, 1000 Lakes, San Remo, Cataluña and RAC by participating in increasingly difficult two-lap races to obtain the best time record possible and qualify for the next course to win the championship. The game employs an isometric perspective as Sito Pons 500cc Grand Prix to portray a television broadcast-style viewpoint.

Every location, composed of six courses each, has its own weather conditions and hazards that change how the vehicle is controlled through the track. Unlike other racing simulators released at the time, there are no AI-controlled opponents participating during races on-screen but their best times are shown when the race is finished. Players have the option to modify the car's characteristics to better accommodate each course and a training option is also available prior to starting a race. Players can resume their progress via password as well.

== Development ==
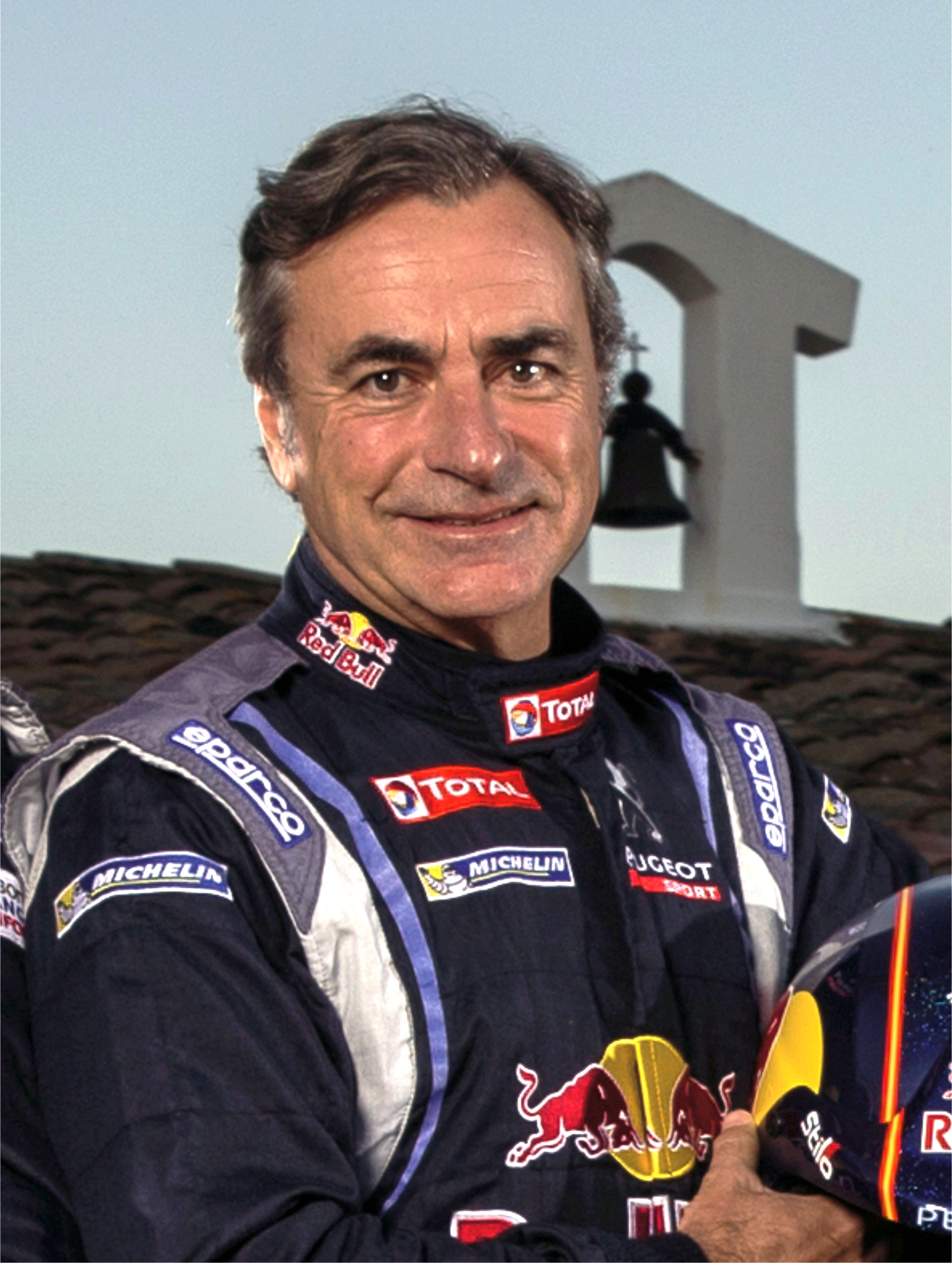
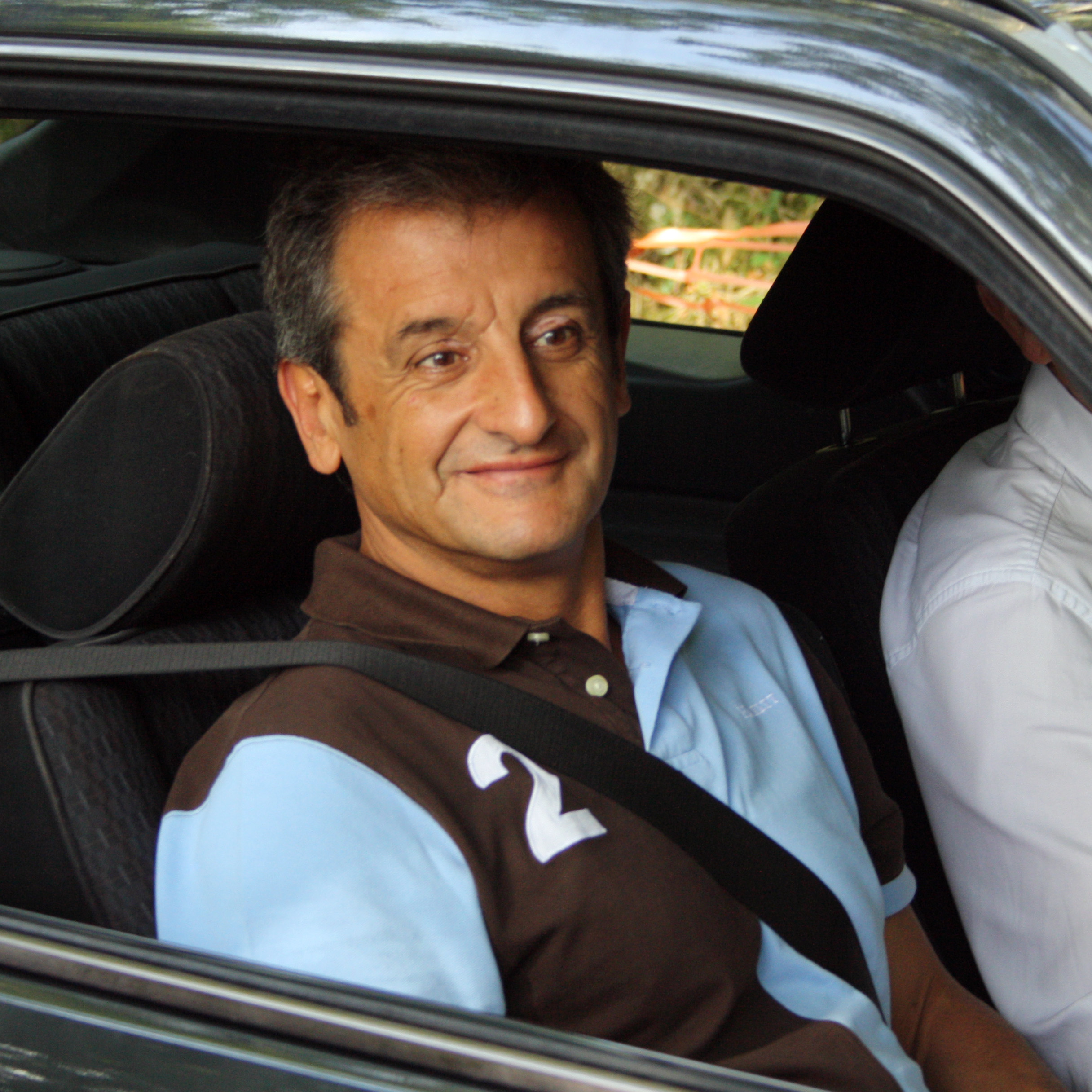
Carlos Sainz (left) and Luis Moya (right) were involved in the production of Carlos Sainz: World Rally Championship with Zigurat and Arcadia, advising the developers and designing the vehicle and courses.

Carlos Sainz: World Rally Championship was created in conjunction with Sito Pons 500cc Grand Prix by Zigurat Software (previously Made in Spain), whose staff worked on licensed sports titles such as Paris-Dakar (1988) and Emilio Sanchez Vicario Grand Slam (featuring former Spanish tennis player Emilio Sánchez), and co-developer Arcadia Software. Fernando Rada and Jorge Granados of Zigurat acted as co-producers. José Miguel Saiz, Manuel Rosas and José Antonio Carrera Merino of Arcadia served as co-programmers and artist respectively. The team recounted the project's development process through interviews.

Carlos Sainz: World Rally originated during a meeting between Zigurat and Arcadia to discuss future projects, where various ideas were pitched such as a golf game and a car game. The idea of creating an accurate rally simulator is because motorsports was a hobby among Zigurat staff and the programmers found rally to be a spectacular discipline and fitting due to graphic and dynamic possibilities. Zigurat hired Spanish rally driver Carlos Sainz, who had yet to become a world champion at the time, and the project started development afterwards. Due to being occupied with development of Sito Pons 500cc, Zigurat assigned the license to Arcadia, supervising production and acting as advisors. According to Miguel Saiz, Arcadia received support from Sainz and his team early in production, as well as advising from Sainz's co-pilot Luis Moya through Zigurat to create different terrain effects. Sainz also advised the team of Zigurat and collaborated with development, designing the vehicle and race courses.

Carlos Sainz shares the same isometric perspective as Sito Pons, allowing the team to adequately simulate car movement, as well as easing composition of curves and giving a greater sense of speed unlike several racing simulation titles that made use of different perspectives. However Antonio Carrera Merino stated that the graphics proved time-consuming and difficult due to the vehicle having 360 degree movement, requiring help to create the graphics and opting for digitization. Saiz also stated that working with terrain effects like skids and jumps proved complicated, while designing courses was a complex issue as well due to memory constrains and the number of maps needed to be implemented. Saiz claimed that the game made use of variables to make driving realistically accurate as possible, with Zigurat providing documentation of car behavior to Arcadia in order to program the driving physics. Saiz also claimed that the title used streaming code that modified driving physics depending on the conditions. Both Zigurat and Arcadia spent many testing hours prior to launch, with Rada polishing the driving physics at Arcadia.

== Release ==
Carlos Sainz: World Rally Championship was published exclusively in Spain by Zigurat Software for Amstrad CPC, MS-DOS, MSX and ZX Spectrum on December 3, 1990. Both the CPC and MSX versions were also distributed by Erbe Software. The CPC version makes use of the computer's Mode 0 display resolution. It was the final release of Arcadia prior to abandoning the video game industry due to external factors according to José Miguel Saiz and José Antonio Carrera Merino. Prior to launch, Carlos Sainz and the development team presented the game to the press at the Toyota headquarters in Madrid. Versions for the Amiga and Atari ST were planned but never released. In 1991, the title was included as part of the Pack Powersports compilation for all platforms.

== Reception ==
Reception

Review scores
Publication	Score
Micromanía	(ZXS) 8/10
Mega Ocio	(CPC) 8/10
MicroHobby	(ZXS) 90%
MSX Club	(MSX) Positive

Carlos Sainz: World Rally Championship was met with positive reception from critics across all platforms since its release and proved to be a local success for Zigurat. Spanish magazine MicroHobby reviewed the ZX Spectrum version, praising the fast movement, visuals, sound, sense of realism and addictive factor. Similarly, Micromanía's José Emilio Barbero also reviewed the Spectrum version, commending the addictive and original gameplay, graphics, difficulty and sense of speed, stating that "Carlos Sainz is a new proof of the absolute dominance of Zigurat in the 8-bit field".

Reviewing the MSX version, MSX Club's Jesús Manuel Montané drew comparison with Konami titles like Hyper Rally and Road Fighter due to its premise, feeling mixed in regards to the graphical presentation and criticized the limited technical complexity but gave positive remarks to the playability and controls, stating that "Carlos Sainz outperforms Sito Pons in many ways, despite being made by the usually mediocre Arcadia programming team". Mega Ocio's César Valencia P. reviewed the Amstrad CPC version and praised the detailed visuals, controls and sound but criticized the excessive difficulty in some sections.

== Legacy ==
After the release of Carlos Sainz: World Rally, Zigurat was contacted by Gaelco to work on an arcade game based on the World Rally Championship featuring Carlos Sainz before he changed teams from Toyota to Lancia near the end of development, being ultimately reworked and released as World Rally (1993). World Rally proved to be a breakthrough title for Gaelco across Europe and attained "mass success", selling around 23,000 units in the region and achieving similar response worldwide. World Rally also gained a cult following, with Santa Ragione designer Pietro Riva stating that the game served as inspiration for Wheels of Aurelia (2016).
