= Screamer (2026 video game) =

- Developer: Milestone
- Publisher: Plaion
- Directors: Federico Cardini (Game Director; Andrea Basilio (Associative Creative Director)
- Designer: Andrea Salamone
- Programmer: Roberta Castano
- Artists: Federico Mattioli (Art Director); Paolo Giannico (Lead Artist)
- Writer: Kerry Kazmierowicztrimm
- Composer: Max Aruj
- Engine: Unreal Engine 5
- Platforms: PlayStation 5; Windows; Xbox Series X/S
- Release: 26 March 2026
- Genre: Racing
- Modes: Single-player, multiplayer

Screamer is a 2026 racing video game developed and published by Milestone for PlayStation 5, Windows and Xbox Series X/S released in March 26, 2026. It is a reboot of the 1995 racing video game of the same name. It is also the first installment of the series since Screamer 4x4 released in 2000.

== Development and promotion ==
Screamer was announced at The Game Awards 2024 ceremony. Upon the game's announcement, Troy Baker was also announced to voice a "pivotal character". In June 2025, Milestone released the first gameplay trailer for the game.

The game is a reboot of Milestone's 1995 game of the same name released on the MS-DOS; at the time, Milestone was known as Graffiti. The 2026 remake is inspired by 1980s and 1990s anime and manga. Japanese animation studio Polygon Pictures, notable for its work on Tron: Uprising and Transformers: Prime among other series, contributed to animated cutscenes for the game.

Neo Rey, a futuristic city inspired by cyberpunk anime, serves as the game's setting.

== Plot ==
In the near future, Mr. Apollo organizes the "Screamer", an underground racing tournament in the city of Neo Rey, where all cars are fitted with Echo devices that restore both vehicle and driver after fatal crashes. Gage Veloc, the mechanic responsible for installing the Echoes, is a former engineer at Jupiter Stormers Industries (JSI) who left the company following the death of his colleague James Edgeworth.

Seeking to test the Echo's capabilities, Gage invites his former JSI teammates Aisha Waghmare, Gregor Falkenstein, and Lavinia Ricci Antinori to enter the tournament under the Jupiter Stormers banner. At the same time, private military contractors, the Banshees—Hiroshi Jackson, Roisin Garrity, and Frederic Barthelemy—compete under the masked identity of the "Green Reapers", intending to assassinate Anaconda Corp heir Gabriel Mertens, whom they blame for the death of their mentor Quinn Connolly. Anaconda Corp enters the event under the sponsorship of Gabriel's mother Abigail, who pits Gabriel against corporate rivals Dirk van Wyk and Hope Kaminsky to determine the company's future leader.

Idol group Strike Force Romanda, led by Ritsuko Imai, joins the Screamer as a publicity stunt, though Ritsuko secretly seeks answers about the death of her lover James. Internal conflict grows within the Green Reapers as Roisin challenges Hiroshi's leadership, believing herself better suited to lead, while Frederic remains loyal to Quinn's wish that Hiroshi remain in charge. Roisin's rivalry with Hiroshi cools after she meets Lavinia and develops romantic feelings for her, weakening Roisin's focus on revenge and affecting her performance. A late‑arriving team, Kagawa‑Kai—composed of Noboru Sato, his brother Keiji, and Akemi Nomura—enters the Screamer under a contract from Abigail to eliminate the Green Reapers. Noboru, who left the clan years earlier, is manipulated by Keiji, who exploits his guilt and a fabricated debt to force him to lead the team and secure Anaconda's contract.

Noboru, traumatized by a near‑fatal crash, spends much of the tournament refusing to race, but gradually bonds with Gabriel over their parallel family pressures. With support from Akemi and Gage, Noboru overcomes his fear, returns to racing, and earns enough points for Kagawa‑Kai to take the lead and eliminate the Green Reapers. Noboru severs ties with his family, defeats Keiji in a duel to free Akemi from the clan, and leaves Neo Rey with her. Kagawa‑Kai's disqualification prompts Gabriel to persuade Apollo to reinstate the Reapers despite knowing they will kill him.

The remaining teams are transferred to the JSI Exo‑Port, an abandoned space station hosting the next duel, where the Green Reapers distract Gage so Hiroshi can sabotage Gabriel's Echo. Before Hiroshi can kill Gabriel, Aisha intervenes and disrupts the duel. It is revealed that Apollo is possessed by the Hollowed, an alien species who are using the Echo to harvest human emotions and transfer their souls into synthetic bodies. Apollo, joining the tournament, forces the teams into a series of races under threat of detonating the Exo‑Port to accelerate the Hollowed's mass transfer.

Gage collaborates with the Green Reapers and Jupiter Stormers to rewire the station's explosives so they will detonate in response to a massive surge of Echo energy, giving the racers a chance to stop the Hollowed. Still influenced by Apollo, Hiroshi continues to pursue Gabriel; after Apollo kidnaps Gabriel and rigs a duel in Hiroshi's favor, Hiroshi decides to spare him. Hiroshi challenges Apollo to a final duel and eliminates him from the tournament.

As the Hollowed's transfer nears completion, Apollo orchestrates a final race in which all drivers channel their emotions through the Echo, triggering the explosives and destroying the Exo‑Port. In the aftermath, Ritsuko realizes that Apollo was James and that she failed to save him; Lavinia appears to die in the destruction, and Hope betrays Gabriel, dropping debris that crushes him to death. Aisha and Gregor decide to use Gage's journal to mass‑produce Echo units, while Hope blames Gabriel's apparent death on the Green Reapers, prompting Abigail to launch a city‑wide manhunt for them. Hiroshi reconciles with Roisin and Frederic and reforms the Green Reapers as a street‑racing team in Quinn's honor. In a series of epilogues, Lavinia and Apollo are revealed to have survived. However, Apollo is killed by the Hollowed Queen.

== Reception ==
Reception

Aggregate scores
Aggregator	Score
Metacritic	(PC) 73/100 (PS5) 76/100 (XSXS) 75/100
OpenCritic	70% recommend

Review scores
Publication	Score
IGN	8/10
PC Gamer (US)	72/100
Push Square	8/10
Shacknews	8/10

Screamer received "generally favorable" reviews for the PlayStation 5 and Xbox Series X/S versions while the Windows version received "mixed or average" reviews, according to review aggregator website Metacritic. Fellow review aggregator OpenCritic assessed that the game received strong approval, being recommended by 70% of critics.

Phil Iwaniuk of PC Gamer rated the game a 72/100, highly praising the game's visual presentation and idiosyncratic characterization, but criticizing its twin-stick driving mechanics. Iwaniuk wrote "In a genre where so many games are determined to squabble over who can make the best LIDAR-scanned Monza, we need more Screamers. Milestone's narrative-led, anime-infused arcade racer has a delightful plethora of fresh ideas, and it lavishes meticulous care into realising them". Iwaniuk opined that the game's driving controls are "very disorienting" and added that "transitioning from a full drift angle to facing straight ahead is awkward, because you don't feel the weight transfer".

Rock Paper Shotgun wrote positively of the game's aesthetic, with James Archer writing, "anime fits this game like a fully tightened wheel nut: its noisy excess, its love of bold colours, its episodic jumping between track locales, its enormous cast of emotionally compromised weirdos." The outlet's Mark Warren wrote that the game's difficulty can be punishing, though conceded, "in a lesser game, the regular demand for near masterful precision just to earn a passing grade might have dulled my enthusiasm to keep collecting chequered flags, but I'm glad to report that's not been the case here".

Luke Reilly of IGN gave a generally positive review of the game, rating it 8/10 and writing that it is a "neon-soaked, maximum volume arcade racing that requires both the finesse of Wipeout and the tactics and aggression of Mario Kart, where dicing for position demands that you think offensively and defensively at all times". Reilly was critical of the tournament mode's "uneven difficulty", but ultimately wrote "tedious characters and difficulty spikes notwithstanding, Screamer is a unique and confidently assembled racer that feels like the result of locking Blur in a room for 12 months with nothing but a Crunchyroll subscription". Reilly also praised the game's various modes and features, such as its four-player split-screen.

The game was nominated for "Best Sports/Racing Game" at The Game Awards 2026.
