= Triplane Turmoil =

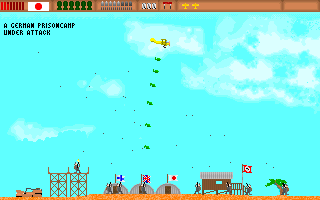
- Original authors: Dodekaedron Software (Markku Rankala, Teemu J. Takanen and Henrikki Merikallio)
- Developers: Timo Juhani Lindfors, Teemu J. Takanen, and Riku Saikkonen (Open source version)
- Release: 1996; 30 years ago
- Stable release: 1.08 / February 24, 2013; 13 years ago
- Platform: cross-platform (originally MS-DOS)
- Type: Single-player, multiplayer Shoot 'em up
- License: GPLv3
- Website: triplane.sourceforge.net
- Repository: https://github.com/vranki/triplane

Triplane Turmoil is a horizontally scrolling dogfighting flying game for MS-DOS by Finnish developer Dodekaedron Software. The game is based on the 1984 MS-DOS game by David Clark, Sopwith. Originally released as shareware, in 2009 Dodekaedron placed the source code, documentation, images and sounds under the GPLv3 on SourceForge, hosted later on github.com. The community continued the support and ported the game via SDL to other platforms including Linux and Windows.

A sequel, Triplane Turmoil 2, was released in 2006

== Plot ==
The world of Triplane Turmoil appears to be set during or some time after the First World War, possibly in the mid-1920s, given the fact that triplanes still have nose-mounted machine guns using interrupter gear, and appear to be capable of carrying and releasing fairly heavy ordnance. Furthermore, respirators do not appear to be in use.

The current state of affairs is that there are 4 major feuding powers: England, Finland, Germany, and Japan. The diplomatic relationships between these powers appear strained and the powers themselves fickle; the single-player campaigns all revolve around a series of rapidly shifting alliances and preemptive strikes.

== Gameplay ==
Players may control their aircraft by pitching up, down, rolling the aircraft 180 degrees, fire the machine gun and dropping bombs. The aircraft can be controlled through the keyboard or a joystick.

The game features four nations: Finland, England, Germany and Japan. Each nation has a single player campaign. There are also multiplayer levels which can be played with human or computer controlled pilots. The countries' planes differ from each other in terms of speed, maneuverability, bomb load capacity, endurance, ammunition capacity and fuel capacity.

The aircraft have 3 potential weapons: Their machine gun, their bombs, in both a ground-attack role and as a primitive air-to-air missile, and, if certain game parameters allow it, the chassis of the aircraft itself in a kamikaze attack. Bombs will destroy an aircraft instantly, whereas bullets deal a random amount of damage. The durability of an aircraft depends on its country of origin: Japanese craft are very lightly armored and only take a few bullets to bring down, whereas a Finnish airplane can take a rather large amount of damage before being destroyed. Damage is indicated by smoke trails.

Each faction generally starts from an airfield consisting of a bomb-proof hangar and runway, a small garrison of infantry, and turrets, towers and tents. The towers and tents have no gameplay effect, however in Single Player they often are objectives to bomb or prevent from being bombed, however, this is not always the case. The hangar and runway is where the aircraft emerges, and also where it can land for repairs, refueling and reloading. Infantry provide weak anti-aircraft fire, but a large mass of them (6 or so) can be a threat to most aircraft. The turrets consist of two types: Anti-aircraft Machine Gun (AAMG) and Anti-aircraft Artillery (AAA or Flak).

Flak turrets are slow to fire, but have a high ceiling and are accurate. They fire a red, incendiary projectile that bursts at a certain altitude. If an aircraft suffers a solid hit from an AAA shell, it will burst into flames and spiral to earth, or possibly explode in midair. Even if the aircraft is only grazed, it will likely begin to smoke heavily, indicating severe damage. A sure-fire way to avoid flak fire is to fly very low; depending on the elevation of the turret and the angle of the gun, the shell may be able to go higher than the operating ceiling of the target.

Machine Gun turrets have a relatively low ceiling, given a turret at a reasonable elevation, an aircraft would likely be able to fly above the bullets unscathed. They are quick to fire, sending up bursts of 5 bullets at a faster rate than aircraft machine guns at quick, regular intervals. Depending on the aircraft being targeted, anywhere from 1 to 4 bursts will do in an unwary pilot.

If a pilot flies too high, the air becomes too thin and they will faint. This causes the aircraft to spiral to the ground, but by pressing either "up" or "down" key, one may manage to slow down enough to have time to wake up and regain control before crashing. This ceiling is indicated by the top of each of the 3 segments in VESA SVGA mode, or the top of the player's screen when it refuses to move up any more in VGA mode, or the top of the screen in Single Player.

=== Single-player ===
Each mission has a set of objectives, generally to bomb a certain target or prevent something from being bombed, but the player can also expect to fly reconnaissance missions and similar, less standard missions.

Each country has a 6-stage campaign, consisting of a linear storyline where the world situation changes depending on the objectives and situation of the previous mission. Invariably, the player's country's Air Force command or its diplomats will make a serious blunder, causing the 3 other powers to ally against the player and launch an all-out aerial assault. Thus, the final mission in any campaign is a last stand against overwhelming odds. Only skilled pilots can hope to succeed.

An indicator provides information about the enemy's altitude and relative distance.

=== Multiplayer ===
In multiplayer mode, anywhere from 2 to 4 factions are active at a time, depending on the number of humans and computer players activated. There is no network multiplayer; all humans must use the same machine simultaneously, using the keyboard and up to 2 joysticks.

Combat takes place on one of 6 maps, and either 2-on-2 alliances are enabled or the game is a free-for-all. Depending on preferences, there may be turrets and infantry. Tents and towers often feature, but have no game significance, rather, they are something to practice on.

There is no story to the multiplayer mode, and the makeup of any active alliances determine whether two allies share one side of the map, or whether players' bases are next to their enemies.

There are two video modes to choose from for multiplayer, the regular VGA, in essence four single-player screens with the addition of a horizontal indicator on each screen, or VESA SVGA, a faster mode in which the entire map is displayed in three bars running across the screen, affording a view of all other planes and all of the terrain.

== Legacy ==
Triplane Turmoil II
- Developer: Draconus Entertainment
- Publisher: Draconus Entertainment
- Platform: Windows XP
- Release: 2006
- Genre: Shoot 'em up
- Modes: Single-player, multiplayer

A sequel, Triplane Turmoil 2, was released in 2006, distributed over the internet. Shortly thereafter the game has experienced a limited release in retail stores as well. Among other things it features 3D graphics with traditional 2D gameplay, and there is supposed to be heavy emphasis on online multiplayer combat. The initial release, however, did not contain the online multiplayer game.

Six nations (Finland, Germany, Japan, Great-Britain, United States and Russia) fight for dominance over each other. Each nation has a six-mission long single player campaign. In addition, the game includes over 30 multiplayer maps, some of which are suitable for 36 players while others are intended for less.

Aerial Turmoil in its literal sense as multiple planes do aerial battle

Finnish base under heavy bombardment by American plane

4-player split screen in action

== Reception ==
Linux Format magazine in December 2011 reviewed Triplane and called it "quite good" and "great fun".
