= Star Trek: The Promethean Prophecy =

1986 video game

- Developer(s): Trans Fiction Systems
- Publisher(s): Simon & Schuster Interactive
- Designer(s): Ron Martinez; Jim Gasperini
- Series: Star Trek
- Platform(s): MS-DOS, Mac, Apple II, Commodore 64
- Release: 1986
- Genre(s): Text adventure
- Mode(s): Single-player

Star Trek: The Promethean Prophecy is a text adventure game developed by Trans Fiction Systems and published by Simon & Schuster Software in 1986 during the 20th anniversary of the Star Trek: The Original Series. The game was developed by Ron Martinez and Jim Gasperini who also worked on Hidden Agenda. The player assumes the role of James T. Kirk captain of the USS Enterprise which has sustained heavy damage after being attacked by an unknown entity. A landing party headed by Kirk beams down to a nearby planet to find food for the ship's crew as the resources onboard became contaminated during the attack.

== Plot ==
Captain James T. Kirk of the USS Enterprise is on an exploration mission in the Prometheus Solar System when the ship comes under attack by an unknown entity. After Spock takes over for a hysterical science officer Berryman, the enemy is determined to be a Romulan Bird of Prey. The Romulans reject all incoming transmissions but send threats to the Captain. Helmsman Hikaru Sulu fires a barrage of four torpedoes at what appears to be a false image of the Romulan vessel. The vessel becomes critically damaged and the Romulan commander tells Kirk that he was avenging his brother whom Kirk had defeated in a prior engagement. Damage reports show that the ship's protein stock used for food synthesis has been contaminated by leaking phaser coolant. The captain and a landing crew beam down to Prometheus Four, a class M planet with a concentration of life which appears to be peaceful.

== Reception ==
Scorpia of Computer Gaming World stated that Promethean was "light years better than" predecessor Star Trek: The Kobayashi Alternative "in both design and execution", and without its bugs. It concluded "Bottom line: Highly recommended!"

== Reviews ==
- Isaac Asimov's Science Fiction Magazine v11 n7 (1987 07)
