= Star Legions =

1992 video game

- Developer: Supernova Creations
- Publisher: Mindcraft
- Designer: Trevor Sorensen
- Platform: MS-DOS
- Release: 1992
- Genre: Strategy
- Mode: Single-player

Trevor Sorensen's Star Legions is a 1992 video game published by Mindcraft.

== Gameplay ==
Star Legions was based on the planetary assault module of Star Fleet II. This allowed for more detailed control of ground troops landing on the planet.

The player has two different kinds of troops: shock-troops and regular troops. The player's task is to first put their shock-troopers down on the planet and destroy its shields. Then they can land their regular troopers and invade the planet. The player could also bombard the planet first and then try to invade it.

It was notable for being an early Command & Conquer-like point and click game with speech.

Troops gain names and experience; after a successful fight, they receive a legion name, such as "Silver Snakes", and improve by recovering faster their suffered losses, because of the remaining veteran fighters.

Finally, the player gets different worlds to invade from primitive to very good developed planets who are more difficult to subdue.

== Development and release ==
This game, published by Mindcraft, another affiliated label of Electronic Arts, was released in late 1992.

The game was designed and written by Trevor Sorensen, Mark Baldwin, and Brett Keeton with artwork by Richard Launius.

Although the initial release was buggy, two patches were soon available which fixed all the known bugs.

== Reception ==
Reception

Review scores
Publication	Score
Computer Gaming World	2.5/5 stars
Dragon	3/5 stars
Electronic Games	90%
Power Play	76%

Computer Gaming World criticized Star Legions for overly simple wargaming mechanics such as lacking air support, restoring legions' health to full between worlds, the lack of impact of the terrain on gameplay, and many serious bugs. The magazine said that Star Legions made injustice to science-fiction and wargame genres. A February 1994 survey of space war games gave it a grade of C, stating that the game "suffered from a high tedium factor". The game (as "Space Legions") was reviewed in 1993 in Dragon #193 by Hartley, Patricia, and Kirk Lesser in "The Role of Computers" column. The reviewers gave the game 3 out of 5 stars. A May 1994 survey of strategic space games set in the year 2000 and later gave the game two-plus stars out of five, stating that it had "an unusual number of bugs and a numbing sameness to the scenarios".

Jim Trunzo reviewed Star Legions in White Wolf #36 (1993), rating it a 4 out of 5 and stated that "Star Legions also boasts many small extras that add up to a large amount of enjoyment. Short speech clips, good sound effects, and some tongue-in-cheek humor make Star Legions worth owning."
