= Sky Runner =

1986 video game

- Developer: Cascade Games
- Publisher: Cascade Games
- Platforms: Commodore 64, MS-DOS, ZX Spectrum
- Release: 1986
- Genre: Shooter
- Mode: Single-player

Sky Runner is a 1986 rail shooter video game developed and published by Cascade Games for MS-DOS, Commodore 64 and ZX Spectrum. The DOS version uses CGA graphics.

== Gameplay ==
Gameplay screenshot

The game is played from the 3rd person perspective with a 3D view similar to Space Harrier. Gameplay involved controlling an aircraft called a skimmer to shoot down enemy towers. After destroying enough, the skimmer would drop down a skybike, which the player would use to destroy other enemy skybikers, while avoiding obstacles like trees. After destroying enough enemies, a boss character called a harvester would appear, which the player would have to defeat. Upon defeating the harvester the game awards the player with money, and loops back to the player controlling the skimmer.
