= Screamer 2 =

1996 video game

- European cover art
- Developer: Milestone
- Publisher: Virgin Interactive
- Director: Antonio Farina
- Producer: Lou Rios
- Programmer: Stefano Lecchi
- Artist: Marco Spitoni
- Platform: MS-DOS
- Release: NA: October 1996; EU: November 15, 1996
- Genre: Racing
- Modes: Single-player, multiplayer

Screamer 2 is a video game developed by Milestone and published by Virgin Interactive Entertainment, released in 1996 on September 30 in North America and November 15 in Europe. It is the second game in the Screamer series. Unlike its predecessor, which drew heavily from Namco's Ridge Racer, Screamer 2 moved towards a rally-oriented style, replacing the six high-performance road cars of the previous game with four rally cars. The game supports up to two players using a split screen and up to four players over a network. A sequel, Screamer Rally, was released in 1997.

GOG.com released an emulated version for Windows and Mac OS X in 2012.

== Reviews ==
GameSpot gave it a 7.0 out of 10, praising the graphics, soundtrack and the price, but criticizing the car's physics. A Next Generation critic hailed it as "one of the first PC racing games to achieve console-like frame rates and outstanding arcade control". He commented positively on the variety of tracks, the texture maps, the techno soundtrack, the multiplayer modes, and the fact that the enemy AI is designed to make occasional mistakes, and scored the game 4 out of 5 stars. Air Hendrix of GamePro commented: "Screamer 2 screeches onto the PC with the kind of addictive fender-bashing found in console titles like Daytona. But here's the catch: To get both decent graphics and speed on this track, you really need something in the Pentium 166 range". He particularly noted the realistically moving cars and the need to play in lo-res mode when using medium-level hardware. Coming Soon Magazine rated it 89/100, praising both the game play and the graphics.
