= Bubble Bus Software =

Video game publisher

Bubble Bus Software was a publisher of video game software for home computers in the mid-1980s, founded by Mark Meakins and based in Tonbridge, Kent. Their releases targeted popular home computers of the time, such as the Commodore 64, VIC-20 and ZX Spectrum. Their most notable releases were Starquake and Wizard's Lair, both written by Stephen Crow. Wizard's Lair was notable for its similarity to both Atic Atac and Sabre Wulf.

== Games developed or published ==
- Alien Panic 64 (Commodore 64)
- Aqua Racer (Commodore 64)
- Awesome Earl in SkateRock (Amstrad CPC, Commodore 64, MS-DOS)
- Boardello (MSX, Tatung Einstein)
- Boing (Commodore 64)
- Brainstorm (ZX Spectrum)
- Bumping Buggies (Commodore 64)
- Cave Fighter (Commodore 16, Plus/4, Commodore 64)
- Cavern Run 64 (Commodore 64)
- Classic Invaders (Amiga, Amstrad CPC)
- Classic Muncher (Amstrad CPC, ZX Spectrum)
- Exterminator (Commodore 64, VIC-20)
- Final Frontier (MS-DOS)
- Flying Feathers (Commodore 64)
- Hustler (Commodore 16, Plus/4)
- Kick Off (Commodore 64)
- Krazy Kong (Commodore 64)
- Max Torque (Commodore 64)
- Metranaut (Commodore 64)
- Minnesota Fats' Pool Challenge (Amstrad CPC, Commodore 16, Plus/4, Commodore 64, MSX, Tatung Einstein, ZX Spectrum)
- Moonlight Madness (ZX Spectrum)
- Starquake (Amstrad CPC, Atari 8-bit, Atari ST, BBC Micro, Commodore 64, MS-DOS, MSX, Tatung Einstein, ZX Spectrum)
- Tazz (Commodore 16, Plus/4, Commodore 64)
- The Fifth Quadrant (Amstrad CPC, Commodore 64, ZX Spectrum)
- The Ice Temple (ZX Spectrum)
- Trizons (Commodore 16, Plus/4)
- Widow's Revenge (Commodore 64)
- Wizard's Lair (Amstrad CPC, Commodore 64, MSX, ZX Spectrum)
