= Silent Hunter (video game) =

1996 submarine simulator

- Developer: Aeon Electronic Entertainment
- Publisher: Strategic Simulations
- Producer: Carl C. Norman
- Designers: William T. Becker; Kim Biscoe
- Programmer: William T. Becker
- Artist: Kim Biscoe
- Composer: Doug Brandon
- Platform: MS-DOS
- Release: March 25, 1996
- Genre: Submarine simulator
- Mode: Single-player

Silent Hunter is a World War II submarine combat simulation for MS-DOS, developed by Aeon Electronic Entertainment and published by Strategic Simulations in 1996. The game takes place in the Pacific War during World War II, the player commanding a submarine of the United States Navy. Most contemporary US submarines and Japanese warships are featured along with some generic merchant ships.

== Gameplay ==
A single encounter generator is available. The standard mode of play is the career mode, where the player must take their boat to patrol far behind enemy lines, to search for and destroy any enemy shipping. For best success, the player should concentrate their search on shipping lanes, which may be deduced from contact reports.

There are special missions which may be assigned to a boat, such as beach reconnaissance, involving photographing potential landing beaches through the periscope, and the rescue of downed airmen. Both missions were performed by the fleet submarines of World War II. The boat is commanded by crewing stations in first person, which is common in the genre. No crew are visible, but their voices are heard.

The periscope view and torpedo controls

In career mode, the game begins when war against Japan is declared and continues until August 15, 1945, when the CINCPAC (Commander in Chief, Pacific Fleet) issues the order to cease all offensive operations against Japan. Success against the enemy rewards the player, with medals proportional to the degree of success on a given patrol.

A patrol without any sinkings will result in a verbal reprimand from COMSUBPAC (Commander, Submarines, Pacific Fleet). Two consecutive patrols with no sinkings will result in the Captain being relieved of command, as happened frequently in the Silent Service, particularly in the early days of the war. If a captain is relieved of command, the game is over. It is possible for Japanese destroyers to sink a submarine by gunfire on the surface, or by depth charge attack while submerged. This also ends the game.

The submarines available are the same boats the United States Navy had during the war. They range from the ancient S-boats, and interwar boats like the Tambor class and Sargo class, to the later wartime Gato-class, Balao class, and Tench class subs. Technological advancements become available to the player at the same time in the game that the boats in the fleet got them. These include radar, the plan position indicator radar display, and the bathythermograph.

Weaponry reflects what the boats had at any given point in the war. The torpedoes range from the Mark X used by the S-boats, to the Mark XIV steam torpedo and Mark XVIII electric torpedo, to the anti-escort "Cutie" acoustic homing torpedo. Deck guns, which are of minor value but have their uses, range from three to five inch, again as the boats received them.

== Reception ==
Reception

Aggregate score
Aggregator	Score
GameRankings	81%

Review scores
Publication	Score
AllGame	3/5
Computer Gaming World	4/5
GameRevolution	C+
GameSpot	8.3/10
PC Gamer (US)	91%
PC Zone	90%

The game received "favorable" reviews according to video game review aggregator GameRankings. Silent Hunter II developer Shawn Storc stated in an interview that Silent Hunter was a commercial success with 300,000 sold units. By 1999, global sales had reached 350,000 copies. Bruce Geryk of GameSpot considered it a noteworthy hit in the simulation genre, a genre whose "era had passed" in his view.

Silent Hunter was nominated as Computer Games Strategy Plus's 1996 simulation of the year, although it lost to Jane's AH-64D Longbow. The game was a finalist for Computer Gaming World's 1996 "Simulation Game of the Year" award, which ultimately went to Jane's AH-64D Longbow.
