= Street Rod =

1989 video game

- Developers: P.Z.Karen Co. Development Group; Logical Design Works; Magic Partners
- Publisher: California Dreams
- Platforms: Amiga, Commodore 64, MS-DOS
- Release: Amiga: UK: 1990; C64: NA: 1989; MS-DOS: NA: 1989
- Genre: Racing
- Mode: Single-player

Street Rod is a racing video game developed by P.Z.Karen Co. Development Group and Logical Design Works, based on an original concept by Magic Partners, and published by California Dreams for Amiga, Commodore 64, and MS-DOS. Street Rod includes Hot Rods, and early American Muscle Cars from GM, Ford, and Chrysler.

In December 2012, MK Consultancy, from the Netherlands, acquired the copyright ownership of the Street Rod games and re-released Street Rod as freeware in 2014. Street Rod SE, an updated version which includes all of the vehicles from the Car Data Disk, was also released as freeware in 2014.

== Gameplay ==
Street Rod takes place in the year 1963. Equipped with a garage and USD$750, the player buys a used car from the classified ads in a newspaper and embarks on a journey to rise through the ranks by winning races against other racers. Using money earned through races. The player can modify their car and compete in more races. Eventually, they will earn the right to challenge The King for his position.

The player starts off on the garage, where cars and parts may be purchased from the newspaper. Purchased parts must be installed by opening the hood of the car, going under the car to remove the transmission, and removing screws, bolts and wires to remove parts off the engine or from the transmission. New or existing parts must be reinstalled in order and the screws, bolts and wires refastened. If the player does not replace the parts in the correct order the car will be undrivable. Tyres can also be installed by jacking up the car. The process of replacing tyres allows the old tyres to be replaced with new tyres or racing slicks. When a car is purchased it comes with around 4gallons of fuel. While racing, the car will eventually run out of fuel. The player can obtain fuel by driving to the gas station.

The two types of races are found by leaving the players garage and going to Bob's Drive In. Races take place on either a dragstrip in the drag race option, or an open country road, for the road race option. Wagers on the drag races can be set from "Just for kicks!" (no wager) to $10 and $50. In road race mode wagers can be set from $25 to $100 and "Pink slips" (the winner of the race receives the loser's car). When the race starts, the player character must wait for a signal to be given to go, or the player forfeits the race due to a jump start.

If the players car does not have an automatic transmission, the player risks "dropping the transmission" during by accelerating and shifting gears, especially at high RPM, or "blow the engine" if the tachometer dial is in the red zone for too long in manual driving mode. If either of these occur, the players character loses the bet they made and, provided they have enough money, they will be transported back to their garage, where the car will require new parts to be able to race again, or they will lose their car under pink slips.

If the player crashes their car during a race, they can "fix it" (get the car repaired for a fee) or "junk it" (have the car scrapped and receive the scrap metal value). However, if they gets involved in a serious crash or the car has already been repaired several times, their only option is to scrap the car. If the player character has no cars in garage and not enough money to buy one, the game ends. There is a risk during drag and road races, that the player will occasionally also get chased by the police. The player can choose to keep speeding (fined up to $75 if caught) or pull over (fined $20 immediately), or be involved in a high speed chase. Getting caught by the police results in the race being forfeited, though the bet made for the race is not lost. If the player character cannot afford to pay the fine, he will be sent to jail which soft locks the game until the timer runs out.

The player has to win a predetermined number of races to be able to challenge The King in a road race. However, this has to be done within the in game time limit, taking too long causes the games timer to expire which is marked by cullender days. If the player wins the race against The King in time, the player character gets The King's car and his girlfriend, becoming the new King.

== Reception ==
Computer Gaming World stated that "the designers of Street Rod have a lot to be proud of ... this game can be recommended for lovers of this era of Americana".

== Sequels ==
Street Rod 2 was released in 1991. The game takes place in the year 1969.

A card game based on the series was also produced by a later rights owner. A third game in the series has also been attempted by a volunteer group.
