= Seek and Destroy (1996 video game) =

- Amiga CD32 Cover
- Developer: Vision Software
- Publisher: Safari Software, Mindscape (Amiga versions): NA: THQ
- Programmer: Paul Andrews
- Artist: Rodney Smith
- Composer: Blair Zuppicich
- Platforms: Amiga, Amiga CD32, MS-DOS
- Release: 1993 (Amiga); 1994 (Amiga CD32); 1996 (MS-DOS)
- Genre: Action
- Mode: Single-player

Seek and Destroy is a 1993 Amiga action video game developed by Vision Software and published by Mindscape, and released in 1994 for the Amiga CD32. A different version was also developed for MS-DOS by the same developer and released in 1996 by publisher Safari Software (then a division of Epic MegaGames). The game bears resemblance to Desert Strike: Return to the Gulf.

== Reception ==
Reception

Review scores
Publication	Score
PC Multimedia & Entertainment	80% (Amiga)
Amiga Format	85% (Amiga)
Amiga Power	73% (Amiga)
CU Amiga	83% (Amiga)
The One	78% (Amiga)
Computer Games	4/5 (DOS)
Power Unlimited	79% (Amiga)
Ruislip & Northwood Gazette	92% (Amiga)
Kingston Informer	3/5 (Amiga)

The Amiga version of "Seek and Destroy" was well received with positive reviews from Amiga Format, Amiga Power, CU Amiga and The One.
