= Sleuth (video game) =

1983 video game

Sleuth titlescreen (running in DOSBox)

Sleuth (running in DOSBox)

Sleuth is a text-based "whodunit" adventure video game created by Eric N. Miller of Norland Software (now defunct). It was first released in 1983 for IBM PC compatible machines running MS-DOS. Instead of utilizing a true CGA graphics mode, the game makes use of the semigraphical characters found in the IBM PC's Code page 437 character set.

== Gameplay ==
When the game starts, a murder has just been committed in the victim's estate. As an investigator, the player must solve the murder mystery by examining the estate and talking to its occupants. The player can move the character using the arrow keys, and interact with persons and objects (after locating the magnifying glass located randomly in one of the rooms) by issuing commands (from a fairly limited vocabulary list) at the game's prompt (similar to Sierra's "Quest" games). To win the game, the player must accurately identify the murder weapon, room the murder took place, and the murderer. The player can do this by examining different objects in the game, talking to the occupants and observing their behavior. The murderer is the one whose alibi contradicts everyone else's. After identifying the three clues, the player must then collect the murder weapon, gather everyone in the room of the murder, and accuse the murderer.

The game is made challenging by the fact that the player has to keep track of everyone's stories and also can only question people once or twice before the murderer becomes suspicious. If the player takes too long to solve the mystery, the murderer will eventually kill the player's character and the game ends. The game has two modes: a "Basic" mode and a "Personalized" mode. The only difference between the two modes is in the naming of in-game characters. In "Basic" mode, the game randomly generates the name of the characters, whereas in "Personalized" mode, the player can supply the names of the characters. Although the game is simple, no two murder scenarios are exactly alike as the game randomizes attributes of the game like the victim, murder scene, murder weapon, and murderer.

The game can be run on Mac with the use of the freeware program "boxer", and has been cloned in JavaScript, enabling users to play it in a web browser.
