= Space Dude =

1996 video game

- Developer: Evryware
- Publisher: FormGen
- Platform: MS-DOS
- Release: 1996
- Genre: Action
- Mode: Single player

Space Dude is a video game developed by Evryware and published by FormGen for MS-DOS computers in 1996.

== Plot ==
The player controls a cosmic being who must defend the Golden City from the attacks of King Dorf and his army of Hoppers. To save the city, Space Dude must destroy the advancing Hoppers and battle King Dorf in his mothership. There are three ways to destroy hoppers: attacking directly, building and manning a defense post, and capturing one hopper to attack another. Before each attack, Space Dude must evade missiles or alien creatures to get to the attack point. During each attack, Space Dude is required to blast a Hopper multiple times to destroy it.

In direct attacks against Hoppers, Space Dude surfs toward the enemy, lobbing bombs at it and avoiding contact. Once the hero passes the Hopper, it will fire a barrage of shots at him until he turns around. These attacks and counterattacks last until either the Hopper or Space Dude is defeated. When Space Dude builds a defense post, he must haul the building materials to the site while dodging missiles from the Dorf mothership. If the dude can make it to the defense site without being hit by missiles, then he builds the defense post at 100 percent strength. If missiles hit Space Dude in transit, he loses materials and the defense post loses strength.

After building the defense post, Space Dude must man the gun and attack the nearest Hopper. Destroying a Hopper typically requires between 20 and 30 shots. When Space Dude attempts to capture a Hopper, he must break into the machine and destroy the Dorfs inside. Once he dispatches them, the dude can control the Hopper and use it to attack other Hoppers nearby.

Finally, Space Dude can choose to attack King Dorf in the mothership to end the siege. Once inside the mothership, Space Dude must destroy guards to get the king's inner chamber. Once inside the king's lair, Space Dude must hit him dozens of times to defeat him. If Space Dude fails, he will need to attack the mothership again, but King Dorf does not regain strength, so the number of shots necessary to destroy him will remain at the number where Space Dude left off.

Whenever Space Dude loses a battle, he must return to the Golden City to recover. During this recovery time, Hoppers can advance on the city. Once a Hopper reaches the city, Space Dude must destroy it before it launches missiles and sets the city ablaze. When that happens, Space Dude is sent flying back into space and the game restarts.

== Gameplay ==
In Space Dude, the player has to complete mini-games, in which the player character has to dodge things or shoot. The player can choose their missions with a choice of either repairing defense guns, capturing Hoppers and going to attack.

== Reception ==
A reviewer for Next Generation criticized the game's lack of a save feature and scored it one out of five stars.
