= Sito Pons 500cc Grand Prix =

1990 video game

- Developer: Zigurat Software
- Publisher: Zigurat Software
- Producers: Fernando Rada; Jorge Granados
- Designers: Carlos Granados; Fernando Rada; Jorge Granados
- Programmers: Carlos Granados; Fernando Rada
- Artist: Jorge Granados
- Platforms: Amstrad CPC, MS-DOS, MSX, ZX Spectrum
- Release: ESP: 1990
- Genre: Racing
- Mode: Single-player

Sito Pons 500cc Grand Prix is a 1990 racing video game developed and published by the Spanish company Zigurat Software (previously known as Made in Spain) for Amstrad CPC, MS-DOS, MSX and ZX Spectrum. Featuring former Spanish racer Sito Pons and themed around motorcycle racing, the game pit players driving the Honda NSR500 with races against AI-controlled opponents across various countries to qualify in the 500cc class of the Grand Prix motorcycle racing.

Sito Pons 500cc Grand Prix was created in conjunction with Carlos Sainz: World Rally Championship at the end of the golden age of Spanish software by most of the same team at Zigurat who worked on previous licensed sports titles such as Paris-Dakar (1988) and Emilio Sanchez Vicario Grand Slam. Zigurat approached Pons to act as endorser due to their local market and motorsports being a hobby among Zigurat staff.

Sito Pons 500cc Grand Prix was met with mostly positive reception from critics across all platforms since its release; praise was given to the graphics, realism and sense of speed, while criticism was geared towards the high difficulty level and sound design. Conversions for the Amiga and Atari ST were planned but never released. The title was included as part of the Pack Powersports compilation for all platforms in 1991.

== Gameplay ==
Amstrad CPC version screenshot

Sito Pons 500cc Grand Prix is a top-down motorcycle racing game similar to Aspar GP Master (1988), where players observe from above and race as Spanish motorcycle driver Sito Pons driving the Honda NSR500 across 14 countries conforming the 500cc class Grand Prix motorcycle racing like the United States, Spain, Italy, Germany, Austria and Yugoslavia. The game uses a isometric perspective like Carlos Sainz: World Rally Championship to portray a TV-style viewpoint.

The game has three modes: Race, Practice and Demo. Race is the main championship mode where players are pitted against AI-controlled opponents such as Kevin Schwantz and Wayne Rainey to qualify. Finishing each race allow the player to receive a number of standings points, depending on the position the player finishes in; a first-place finish rewards a maximum of 20 points for each track, and the total maximum number of points possible is 280. Players can resume their progress via password. In Practice mode, the player can train in any of the available courses. Demo mode depicts gameplay with an AI-controlled Pons.

== Development and release ==
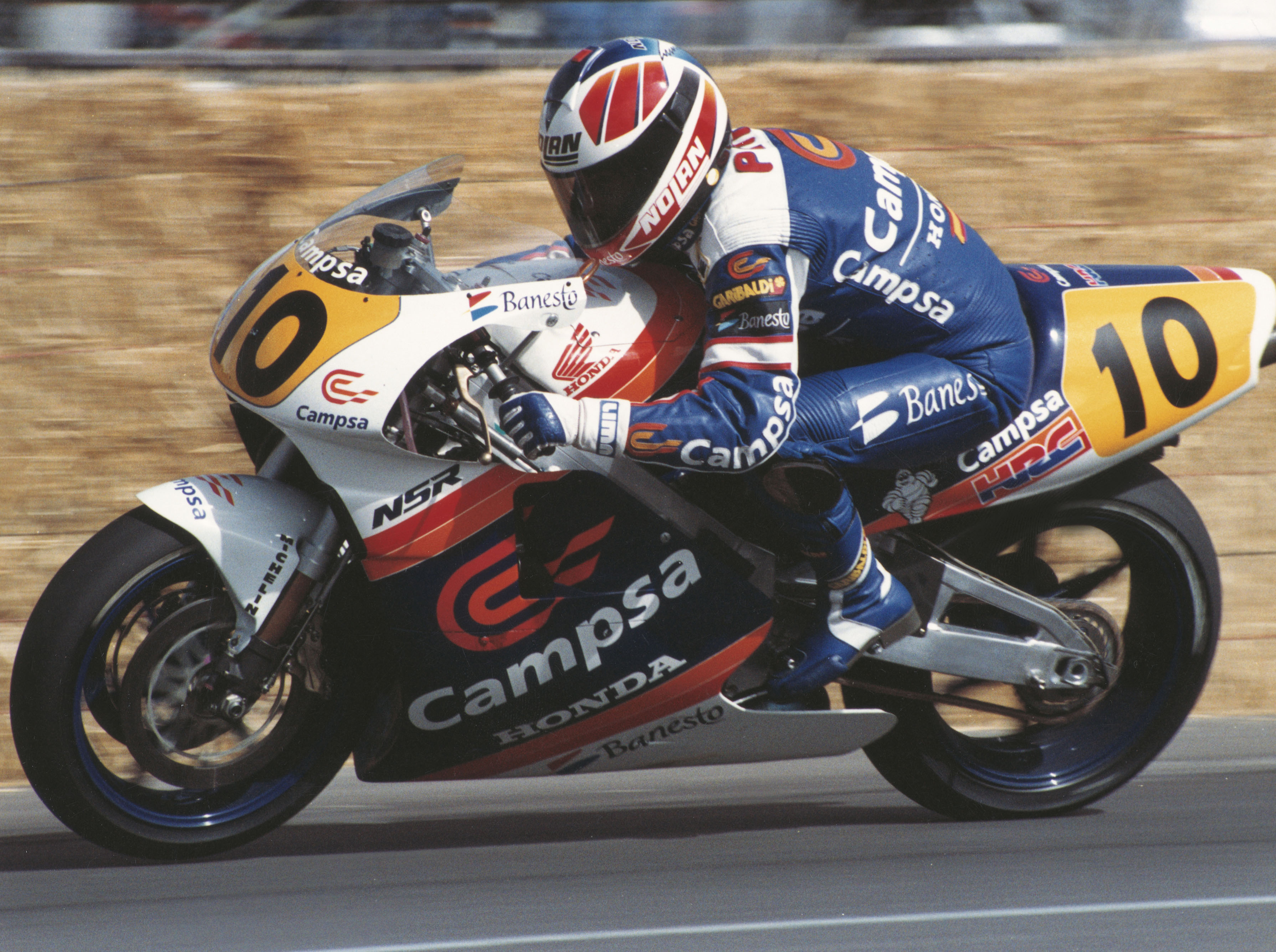
Zigurat Software approached former Spanish motorcycle racer Sito Pons (pictured 1991) due to their local market and motorsports being a hobby among the staff at Zigurat.

Sito Pons 500cc Grand Prix was created in conjunction with Carlos Sainz: World Rally Championship at the end of the golden age of Spanish software by Zigurat Software (previously Made in Spain), whose team worked on previous licensed sports titles such as Paris-Dakar (1988) and Emilio Sanchez Vicario Grand Slam (featuring former Spanish tennis player Emilio Sánchez). The project was handled by three members: Fernando Rada and Carlos Granados acted as co-programmers. Artist Jorge Granados was responsible for the visuals and design for all versions, while all three members served as designers.

The team recounted the project's development process through interviews, stating that Zigurat approached to former Spanish motorcycle racer Sito Pons to act as endorser of the game due to their local market and motorsports being a hobby among Zigurat staff. Sito Pons shares the same isometric perspective as Carlos Sainz: World Rally, but Zigurat placed more emphasis into AI for the opposing racers. Carlos stated that Rada and Jorge were in charge of the game's driving aspect.

Sito Pons 500cc Grand Prix was published exclusively in Spain by Zigurat Software for Amstrad CPC, MS-DOS, MSX and ZX Spectrum in 1990. The MSX version was also distributed by Erbe Software. The CPC version featured more colors on-screen compared to the MSX and ZX Spectrum versions, which displayed less colors on-screen. Versions for the Amiga and Atari ST were planned but never released. In 1991, the title was included as part of the Pack Powersports compilation for all platforms.

== Reception ==
Reception

Review scores
Publication	Score
Micromanía	(CPC) 8/10
FIFO	(ZXS) 8/10
MicroHobby	(ZXS) 92%
MSX Club	(MSX) Mixed

Sito Pons 500cc Grand Prix was met with mostly positive reception from critics across all platforms since its release. Spanish magazine MicroHobby reviewed the ZX Spectrum version, praising the realism, sense of speed, television broadcast-style perspective, colorful graphics and addictive playability, describing it as a "neatly carried out" game. Micromanía's José Emilio Barbero reviewed the Amstrad CPC version, commending the pseudo-3D perspective, detailed visuals, realism, accurate controls and "incredibly good" scrolling, but criticized the excessively high difficulty and sound design due to an unpleasant and continuous sound of the motorcycle's engine. Barbero also gave a brief outlook to the ZX Spectrum version, criticizing the less colorful and detailed visuals, as well as the high difficulty but praised it for retaining the same technical performance as the CPC version.

Reviewing the MSX version, MSX Club's Jesús Manuel Montané drew comparison with titles such as Aspar GP Master due to its premise, criticizing the monochrome graphics and high difficulty level but remarked that its scheme was valid, stating that the game was moderately entertaining. In a retrospective outlook, IGN Spain's Víctor Ayora regarded Sito Pons 500cc as one of the best games released on 8-bit computers. Ayora stated that Sito Pons successfully implemented isometric perspective and speed but noted its extreme difficulty. When comparing each platform, he noted that the Amstrad CPC version was the best graphics-wise compared to the ZX Spectrum version due to the increased color palette, though he also reported that every version played nearly the same gameplay-wise.
