= Steel Thunder =

1988 video game

- Developer(s): Tom Loughry
- Publisher(s): Accolade
- Platform(s): Commodore 64, DOS
- Release: 1988
- Genre(s): Vehicle simulation
- Mode(s): Single-player

Steel Thunder is a 1988 video game published by Accolade. Designed by Tom Loughry, it is labeled an "American Battle Tank Simulation" on the title screen.

== Gameplay ==
Steel Thunder is a game in which modern armored warfare is simulated.

== Reception ==
Wyatt Lee reviewed the game for Computer Gaming World, and stated that "Accolade has: 1) paved the way for future tank simulations, 2) proven that the company is serious about developing more than action games, and 3) published a challenging game all in one bold stroke."
