= OutNumbered! =

1990 video game

Super Solvers: Outnumbered!
- Developer: The Learning Company
- Publisher: The Learning Company
- Platforms: MS-DOS, Classic Mac OS
- Release: NA: 1990
- Genre: Educational
- Mode: Single-player

OutNumbered! is an educational video game published by The Learning Company in 1990 for Windows and Classic Mac OS. It is aimed at children ages seven to fourteen and is designed to teach mathematical computation and problem solving skills.

== Gameplay ==
OutNumbered! is a side-scrolling educational game whose objective is to stop the Master of Mischief, a common antagonist of The Learning Company's Super Solvers series and Treasure series, from taking over a television and radio station before midnight. To do this, the player must deduce which room the Master of Mischief is hiding in by comparing sets of patterns for each room to those of the room the Master of Mischief is hiding in. To obtain the pattern for each room, the player must visit each room and solve a math puzzle related to that room.

During the course of the game, the player will randomly happen upon the Master of Mischief's robot, Telly, who will attempt to knock down the player by either crashing into them or hitting them with hurled discs, sound waves, lightning bolts, or energy stars. If the player zaps Telly with his zapper before any of these things happen, and while Telly's screen is red, they will get a chance to earn a clue to the pattern of the room that the Master of Mischief is hiding in.

When the player has all four patterns for the room the Master of Mischief is hiding in as well as those of each room, they must decide which room he thinks the Master of Mischief is hiding in. The player must compare clues obtained by zapping Telly to those for each room. If the player correctly guesses the room the Master of Mischief is hiding in, they will get a bonus score based on time and zapper energy remaining. This score will then be added to the player's lifetime score. If the guess is incorrect or the player fails to gather enough information by midnight, they will lose the game and their lifetime score will not change.

As the player wins more games, their lifetime score will increase. At certain score amounts, the player will advance in rank and the game becomes more difficult, and the match rule changes.

== Development ==
=== Super Solvers series ===
The Super Solvers series is a series of computer games released by The Learning Company that contain both educational and entertainment qualities.

OutNumbered! is the second program of the series to be released. Other programs in this series include Midnight Rescue!, Spellbound!, and Gizmos and Gadgets! among others.

=== Music ===
In lieu of original musical scores, OutNumbered! uses famous classical pieces as background music. The music played in the halls is from Mozart's 40th Symphony, specifically, its first and fourth movements. The music played in the rooms is based on Rachmaninoff's variations on Paganini's 24th Caprice. The music played on the title screen is based on Bach's Prelude in C minor, BWV 999.

=== Enhanced version ===
In 1995, a slightly enhanced and more Windows-friendly version was released on CD-ROM.

== Reception ==
Reception

Review score
Publication	Score
Abandonia	4.0 out of 5

OutNumbered! was reviewed in the Oppenheim Toy Portfolio Guide Book where it was praised for its imaginative gameplay. The authors claimed that the game "proves that practicing math problems need not be tedious".
