= Sons of Liberty (video game) =

1987 video game

- Developer(s): George W. Kucera
- Publisher(s): Strategic Simulations
- Platform(s): Apple II, Atari 8-bit, Commodore 64, MS-DOS
- Release: 1987
- Genre(s): Computer wargame

Sons of Liberty is a computer wargame published by Strategic Simulations in 1987 for the Apple II, Atari 8-bit computers, Commodore 64, and MS-DOS.

== Gameplay ==
Sons of Liberty is a game in which American Revolutionary War scenarios include Bunker Hill, Monmouth, and Saratoga.

== Reception ==
Wyatt Lee reviewed the game for Computer Gaming World, and stated that "In summary, one must note that each release in the "American Civil War" series showed refinements over the previous game. SOL is no exception."
