= Screamer (1995 video game) =

1995 video game

- European cover art featuring Shadow (Lamborghini Countach, foreground) and Tiger (Ferrari F40, background)
- Developer: Graffiti
- Publisher: Virgin Interactive
- Director: Antonio Farina
- Producers: Peter Hickman; Kevin Potter
- Programmers: Antonio Miscellaneo, Antonio Martini(3D Engine)
- Artist: Marco Spitoni
- Composers: Allister Brimble; John Symonds; Neal Reynolds
- Platform: MS-DOS
- Release: EU: 1995; NA: October 31, 1995
- Genre: Racing
- Mode: Single-player

Screamer is a 1995 racing video game for MS-DOS compatible operating systems. The game uses texture mapped polygon-modelled tracks and cars and shares some elements with Namco's 1993 Ridge Racer. A sequel, Screamer 2, was released in 1996.

GOG.com released an emulated version for Windows in 2009 and Mac OS X in 2012.

A reboot of the series was announced at the Game Awards 2024 and was released on 26 March 2026.

== Gameplay ==
The gameplay of screamer is an arcade circuit based game, typical for racing games of its time.

Screamer is rather overexaggerated in gameplay, showing the player what way the car was leaning by showing the vehicle harshly leaning in either direction when at higher speeds. The gameplay also allowed for the player to crash, showing an in game animation of the car flipping and landing on its wheels.

The games handling mechanics are described as rather "drifty". The standard 'arcade' mode in Screamer is a 3 lap race against AI opponents with the goal of getting 1st place.

The game offers various modes: Normal game, championship, special modes, and the option for a network game.

In the championship mode, players play through a series of 6 circuits, gaining score based on the position they get at the end of the race, players start in the rookie league and work their way through the levels.

== Development ==
Software rendering is used in the game, unlike Screamer's three sequels Screamer 2, Screamer Rally and Screamer 4x4, that all utilized 3D hardware (in the case of Screamer 2, after a patch was released.) As a result, Screamer was one of the early games to really require a Pentium processor to run at full speed, particularly in SVGA mode. A special 3D accelerated version was available with the Number Nine Reality 332FX graphics card, that utilized the S3 ViRGE chipset.

The game's music was composed by Allister Brimble.

== Reception ==
A reviewer for Maximum commended the game for its high speed, replay sequences, smoothly scrolling graphics, selection of vehicles, numerous modes and options, overall high longevity, and low price point. He noted that the computer-controlled opponents follow a fixed course, and would even crash full speed into the player car rather than deviate from that course, but did not feel this was a bad thing. He gave the game 5 out of 5 stars. A reviewer for Next Generation was also pleased with the graphics, selection of vehicles, and numerous modes. He praised the game for being more accessible than most racers, allowing players to begin racing without having to figure out the car's technical aspects, though he also criticized it as being "simplistic". He scored it 4 out of 5 stars, concluding that "there may not be a lot to it, but the graphics, playability, and selection of cars with their different qualities make it a title worthy of a look".

An advertisement for the game, showing a burnt-out car wreckage with the slogan "Every Christmas the roads are full of mad men. Join them", aroused public outcry.
