= Speed Haste =

1995 video game

- Developer: NoriaWorks Entertainment
- Publisher: Friendware
- Platform: MS-DOS
- Release: 1995
- Genre: Racing
- Modes: Single-player, multiplayer

Speed Haste is a 3D racing video game for MS-DOS. It includes both Formula One and stock cars. It was released in North America by WizardWork Group, under the name "Circuit Racer", and in Holland by Multimedia International BV (named Grand Prix Speed)

The player can compete in championship mode, covering all circuits with an increasing difficulty. The multiplayer mode offers split-screen racing or IPX-based sessions with up to 4 players.

== Legacy ==
In 2012, the game's developer, Javier Arevalo Baeza, released the C source code (minus some commercial libraries) as public-domain software on GitHub.
