= Shadows of Cairn =

1994 video game

- MS-DOS title screen
- Developer: Ant Software
- Publisher: Masque Publishing
- Platforms: MS-DOS, Windows 3.1
- Release: November 1994
- Genre: Platform
- Mode: Single-player

Shadows of Cairn is a side-scrolling platformer developed by Ant Software and released by Masque Publishing in 1994 for MS-DOS and Windows 3.1. The player assumes the role of Quinn, an apprentice thief in the land of Cairn.

== Plot ==
Although Quinn is an apprentice thief, he is too honest to steal anything of value and prove himself to his guild. As a result, his guild master sets him up to take the fall for the murder of the Duke of Cairn.

After managing to escape his holding cell, Quinn must use a combination of fighting and stealth to traverse several areas of the tiered outpost city in the mountains of Cairn. His mission is to prove his innocence and thwart the plans of his former master and associates, who are plotting to exploit the outpost for their own selfish gain.

== Gameplay ==
Screenshot

Similar to Prince of Persia, Shadows of Cairn features two major gameplay elements. In the game, the player takes control of Quinn and must navigate him through treacherous terrain, overcoming pits and obstacles by utilizing running, jumping, climbing, and hiding abilities. Additionally, the player must engage in combat with enemies to progress. Quinn does not fight automatically; the player must manually activate fight mode and employ high, medium, and low punches or kicks to defeat opponents.

Unlike Prince of Persia, Shadows of Cairn offers four difficulty levels. In addition to Easy, Normal, and Hard, there is a fourth difficulty level called "Very Easy." This mode allows players to cheat their way through the game by granting them infinite hit points or complete immunity to being hit. The only potential drawback of this mode is the risk of getting trapped in certain traps that would otherwise result in immediate death.

The game guides the player by providing waypoints directly on Quinn's compass, indicating the locations they need to reach to progress the story. These waypoints can lead the player to various places, ranging from local taverns to magical towers located on different tiers of the city. The game's linear nature ensures that it is unlikely for the player to become lost or stuck. Notably, there is no inventory system in the game. However, chests can be found throughout the world containing useful items such as medicinal herbs or quest-related items like the Crazy Guy's Rat, which advance the story or can be traded for other items, including new weaponry.

Periodically, the player is treated to in-game animated cutscenes. These cutscenes feature full voice-acting (using tracks from the CD-ROM) and distinct animation styles, differing from both the cover art and the in-game sprites.

== Reception ==
The game received poor reviews from critics. PC Gamer scored it a 40%, characterizing it generally as boring. They also noted intensely frustrating fighting dynamics and excessively difficult mazes. The Swedish High Score magazine was even harsher, giving the game a score of 20% and specifically critiquing its content and playability.

James V. Trunzo reviewed Shadows of Cairn in White Wolf Inphobia #55 (May, 1995), rating it a 3.5 out of 5 and stating that "For gamers who enjoy arcade-style play, Shadows of Cairn is an amusing diversion with some depth of play."

Despite the negative playability aspects, the "high resolution" (44.1 kHz) rock soundtrack received favorable attention, earning praise from reviewers such as Computer Gaming World and the Sydney Morning Herald. New Media Magazine awarded it an Invision Award Finalist for "Best Audio/Soundtrack of the Year 1995".
