= Star Trek: First Contact (video game) =

1988 video game

- Developer(s): Micromosaics
- Publisher(s): Simon & Schuster Interactive
- Platform(s): Apple II, DOS
- Release: 1988
- Genre(s): Adventure

Star Trek: First Contact is a 1988 video game published by Simon & Schuster Interactive. The games was published for the Apple II and for MS DOS.

== Gameplay ==
Star Trek: First Contact is a game in which Captain James T. Kirk and the Enterprise must contact aliens who are sending out a pulse signal before the Klingons reach the aliens.

Kirk will also need to complete his current diplomatic mission of attending a ceremony on mineral-rich Gothica for the coronation of its prince Clavis.

== Reception ==
Dennis Lynch for the Chicago Tribune said: "Twice burned, I was a little wary when I loaded up Star Trek: First Contact [...] But I got a pleasant surprise, Trekkies. The game is really quite good. First Contact has an intriguing plot."

Scorpia reviewed the game for Computer Gaming World, and stated that "Primarily for beginning to average players, since advanced players will get through this one in an afternoon."

Jeff Donahue for Home Office Computing said that "Trekkies will enjoy First Contact even though it falls short of its predecessor, Rebel Universe. It offers features we've come to expect from the Star Trek series (graphic depictions of key game elements and the ability to control crew members) in addition to new features such as the Captain’s auto-log and access to the Enterprise’s databanks."

VideoGames & Computer Entertainment said that "Expanded options, better music and a set of fairly nice illustrations makes it a fuller play experience than Kobayashi Alternative." VideoGames & Computer Entertainment later said that "This tangled tale of an encounter with an alien race incorporates an upgraded version of the Kobayashi play system and adds to it a nice set of illustrations."
