= Street Rod 2 =

Video game published by California Dreams in 1991

- European cover art
- Developers: P.Z.Karen Co. Development Group; Logical Design Works
- Publisher: California Dreams
- Platforms: Amiga, MS-DOS
- Release: 1991
- Genre: Racing
- Mode: Single player

Street Rod 2 is a video game developed by P.Z. Karen Co. Development Group and Logical Design Works as a sequel to Street Rod, based on an original concept by Magic Partners and published by California Dreams for Amiga and MS-DOS. Street Rod 2 exclusively features American muscle cars, specifically those from GM, Ford, and Chrysler. In December 2012, MK Consultancy, a Dutch company, acquired the copyright ownership of the Street Rod games and re-released Street Rod 2, as well as the original game and an updated version, as freeware in 2014.

== Changes from Street Rod ==
- The game is set in the summer of 1969, beginning on June 14, the first day of summer vacation. (Street Rod was set in 1963).
- A largely different set of cars is available, most of them dating from the 1960s.
- There are now two variants of each car available to buy - an abused one (cheaper, with worn parts) and one in good condition. All cars can only be bought once during the game.
- The differential, muffler and exhaust manifold can be replaced.
- The engine is shown in the engine bay and tuning takes place on the same screen.
- Car stickers are unavailable.
- Races are arranged outside of "Burgers Bungalow" instead of "Bob's Drive-In".
- There are two road tracks: Mulholland Drive, largely based on the Road race from Street Rod, and a completely new track, the Aqueduct, which resembles the aqueduct in the movie Grease.
- A car crash can result from hitting rocks, drains, barriers and bridge supports at any speed, or from passing through roadworks on the Mulholland Drive track at speeds greater than 50 mph. Travelling too far up a sloped wall on the Aqueduct at high speed results in the car flipping over.
- The King drives a 1967 Shelby GT500 (erroneously labeled as a 1969 one,), with a unique supercharger that is unavailable as an upgrade within the game.
- Every Wednesday night, the player can compete in a bracket racing drag competition called "Grudge Night". For a small entrance fee, the player is required to set a "breakout time" down the drag strip, after which the player must defeat all opponents without running faster than that time.

== Sequels ==
Street Rod 3 was an unfinished, unofficial sequel to the series. It was being developed for Windows and Linux with the aim of recreating a game similar to Street Rod 2. It aimed to add more cars and parts and also to transition the series from 2D to 3D graphics. The latest alpha release, version 0.4.4.1, is available under the GNU General Public License. Development of this version seems to have ceased.

== Reception ==
Mike Weksler reviewed the game for Computer Gaming World, and stated that "after several hours of reliving 'hot rod' memories, the player may end up cruisin' down to his old hangouts on a Wednesday night. He'll most likely see a new generation of cars lined up at the local burger joint with hoods open, chrome glistening and terms like 'four bolt main' and 'camelback heads' floating in the air. The player may also be surprised to see fresh rubber streaking the pavement at the old drag strip, but if he doesn't, he can always come home and fire up Street Rod II: The Next Generation!"

=== Other reviews ===
- 576 KByte
- Compute!
- Amazing Computer Magazine
- Game Player's PC Strategy Guide
