= Screamer Rally =

1997 video game

- Developer: Milestone
- Publisher: Virgin Interactive
- Platform: MS-DOS
- Release: NA: 1997
- Genre: Racing
- Modes: Single-player, multiplayer

Screamer Rally, released in 1997, is the third game in the Screamer series, developed by Milestone and published by Virgin Interactive. The game builds on Screamer 2, but changes context to a rallying game. The game made use of 3dfx Voodoo Graphics chipset, allowing the game's graphics hardware acceleration access to high resolution and texture filtering. The game includes seven tracks, one each in China, Canada, Italy, Arizona, Sweden and Wales, with the addition of a bonus course. A sequel, Screamer 4x4, was released in 2000.

== Reception ==
Reception

Review scores
Publication	Score
GameStar	79%
PC Games (DE)	81%
PC Zone	9.1/10
