= Sign of the Sun =

1997 video game

- Developer: International Computer Entertainment
- Publisher: Project Two Interactive
- Platform: MS-DOS
- Release: 1997
- Genre: Adventure

Sign of the Sun is an adventure video game published by Project Two Interactive for MS-DOS in 1997.

== Gameplay ==
James Mariner, an astronaut drawn beneath the Sun's surface by a tractor beam, must navigate an underground solar world where its inhabitants plan to destroy the Galaxy and consume his DNA. Guided mostly by his computer assistant's frequent dialogue, he moves through a simple two‑dimensional environment, wandering between locations, interacting with characters, and following a single path toward escaping captivity and stopping the impending annihilation. The game consists of 150 different locations including vast lava caverns. During the course of the game the player encounters talking stones, flying lizards, various gate mechanisms as well as puzzles that the player must solve.

== Plot ==
James Mariner flew his spaceship too close to the sun and was captured by a tractor beam. He finds himself under the solar surface and has to escape to stop the natives from destroying the Galaxy.

== Reception ==
Reception

Review scores
Publication	Score
PC Zone	41%
PC Player	21%
PC Games	60%
GameStar	42%
Hyper	72%
PC Action	46%

PC Zone gave the Sign of the Sun a score of 41 out of 100, wishing that the game had more characters to interact with and more content to complete. PC Player gave the game a score of 21 out of 100, criticizing the controls and action sequences.
