= Moonlight Madness (video game) =

1986 video game

- Developer: John F. Cain
- Publisher: Bubble Bus Software
- Platform: ZX Spectrum
- Release: 1986
- Genre: Platform
- Mode: Single-player

Moonlight Madness is a platform game for the ZX Spectrum home computer, published in 1986 by Bubble Bus Software. The player controls a boy scout attempting to unlock a safe within a mansion to obtain pills for the mansion's owner, a mad scientist, who has collapsed. This requires the player to traverse the mansion's rooms while avoiding hazards such as dangerous house servants and fatal falls.

The game was developed by John F. Cain, who had previously created Booty, a popular budget game. Moonlight Madness was criticized for its price on release, £7.95 in the UK, as well its technical issues. The game's graphics, gameplay and sound were negatively rated by critics, though some reviewers were more positive over these different aspects of the game.

== Gameplay ==
Players must guide a boy scout through a 23-room mansion in order to obtain 16 keys and a 4 digit combination before running out of lives. The keys unlock the ACME safe containing the pills needed to save the mansion owner's life. It is necessary to jump onto platforms and evade enemies in order to progress. At the start of the game the player has four lives; a life is lost should the boy scout fall too far or come into contact with one of the mansion's servants or traps. Rooms contain doors that can be entered to move around the mansion, as well as push buttons and hazards. Pressing buttons can result in lifts being activated, platforms appearing or an enemy appearing. One of the mansion's rooms is a corridor of eight doors with a large pair of eyes above them; this room acts as a maze. A tune is played continuously during play, but can be toggled on or off by pressing the 'M' key on the keyboard.

== Plot ==
The player character, a boy scout, has approached a mansion looking for work during Bob a Job week. The door is answered by an old man wearing horn-rimmed glasses—the owner of the mansion. The man, a mad scientist, expresses surprise that the boy has managed to get past the guards and booby traps in the mansion's grounds. As the boy scout explains the reason for his visit, the scientist collapses, asking for his pills. At this point the game begins. The player must gather the 16 keys needed to unlock the ACME safe and retrieve the scientist's pills before he passes away. During play the boy scout must negotiate the mansion's rooms, avoiding hazards and the mansion's staff, who have been told to protect the inventions within the mansion, using lethal force if necessary. The staff are unaware of the boy scout's purpose and will attack him should they come into contact.

== Development and release ==
The game was created by John F. Cain, who had previously developed the successful budget game Booty for Firebird Software. By this point Cain had also developed several titles for Rabbit Software, such as Potty Painter. Moonlight Madness was published by Bubble Bus in the United Kingdom and Spain in 1986; the original price was £7.95 in the United Kingdom. Moonlight Madness was re-released on budget software labels; Blue Ribbon Software in the United Kingdom, Zafi Chip and Z Cobra in Spain. Blue Ribbon Software was a label belonging to CDS Microsystems, both of the Spanish budget labels belonged to Zafiro Software Division. The game was published on the covertape of the February 1991 issue of Your Sinclair magazine. The covertape also featured Marsport, Ninja Hamster and Wizard's Lair.

== Reception ==
Reception

Review scores
Publication	Score
Crash	56%
Computer and Video Games	23 out of 40
Your Sinclair	6 out of 10
Computer Gamer	11 out of 20
Popular Computing Weekly	1 out of 5
ZX Computing	Grim

Moonlight Madness received negative and mediocre ratings from reviewers, who either criticized the game overall or different aspects of it. Direct comparisons with Booty feature in many reviews. The game's price was in particular a common complaint among reviewers, who stated that it should have been a budget-priced title. One reviewer stated that it would have been better received as a budget title, another stated "Like Booty, Moonlight Madness would be all right at budget price". Your Sinclair's reviewer began their piece by stating "Hmmm, don't like the title Moonlight Madness much, howzabout Daylight Robbery. Catchy, ain't it?" Computer Gamer's reviewer stated "Had it been released on a budget label, Moonlight Madness would have been fair value for money. As it is, it is grossly overpriced."

The boy scout (bottom left) makes his way through the maze corridor

Reviewers highlighted technical issues in the game. The eight door maze room was thought to be a bug, a software error, by two people at ZX Computing magazine. Because the game contains no reset feature they reloaded the game from cassette in order to continue playing. The player character's movements were criticised for being jerky and prone to stopping at infrequent intervals. One of Crash magazine's staff stated that the boy scout's movement to the left was quick; "as if there's a force ten gale blowing to the left." They added "When any attempt is made to move right, all the moving characters on the screen slow right down." In-game objects are removed from view when either the player character or one of the mansion staff move in front of them. When the player redefines the game's keyboard controls, allowing them to choose which keys move the boy scout during play, the pause key and music toggle key are not included. As a result it is possible to double-up movement controls with these two functions, effectively causing the game to pause and unpause or for the music to toggle constantly as the player moves in that direction.

Reviewers' opinions on the graphics and gameplay were largely negative, while opinions on the title's music varied. The background music was described as "...the only thing that is remotely interesting about this appallingly tedious game..." by Popular Computing Weekly's reviewer. He followed this by stating "At first it sounds all right, if a little monotonous, then it begins to grate the nerves. After a while it begins to take on all the appeal of the Chinese water torture." Crash magazine's three reviewers were more positive about the music, stating "The sound is fairly well done...", "The title screen plays a nice tune..." and "...the game's drawing point is the sound..." The game's graphics were described as "fairly crude", "unattractive" and "...none too exciting, consisting of colourful but flickery characters." One reviewer stated "The graphics are large and colourful but there is a lot of character clash..." Overall impressions of Moonlight Madness were negative. Crash magazine's reviewers compared the game unfavourably to Booty. One expressed disappointment because of Bubble Bus' history of releasing "great arcade/adventures". Your Sinclair's reviewer stated "Maybe Bubble Bus had a touch of Moonlight Madness when it picked this one for its new release." The reviewer from ZX Computing stated "Keeping to the boy scout theme, be prepared before you buy this one."
