= Wheels of Aurelia =

2016 visual novel by Santa Regione

- Game art from PC release
- Developer: Santa Ragione
- Publisher: Santa Ragione
- Artists: Luca Francesco Rossi; Flaminia Grimaldi; Patrick Leger
- Writers: Matteo Pozzi; Claudia Molinari
- Composers: Michael Manning; Nicolò Sala
- Engine: Unity
- Platforms: Linux; OS X; Windows; PlayStation 4; Xbox One; Android; iOS; Nintendo Switch
- Release: 20 September 2016: Linux, OS X, Windows; WW: 20 September 2016; PlayStation 4; WW: 4 October 2016; Xbox One; WW: 18 November 2016; Android, iOS; WW: 19 October 2017; Nintendo Switch; WW: 2 November 2017
- Genres: Adventure, visual novel
- Mode: Single-player

Wheels of Aurelia is a 2016 visual novel and adventure video game by Italian studio Santa Ragione. It was released worldwide in September 2016 for Linux, OS X, and Windows; in October 2016 for the PlayStation 4; in November 2016 for the Xbox One; October 2017 for Android and iOS; and November 2017 for the Nintendo Switch. Its story is set in 1978 Italy and tells the story of Lella who drives along the Italian motorway Via Aurelia alongside one or many companions; commenting on issues such as single parenthood, fascism, and the Mafia.

The player controls Lella's vehicle from a bird's-eye view and dialogue choices using a branching dialogue system. On her way across Via Aurelia, she meets hitchhikers who can alter the story's outcomes. While its gameplay approximately lasts fifteen minutes, it offers sixteen different endings. It was inspired by the 1986 arcade game Out Run and the cult film Il Sorpasso. Wheels of Aurelia received mixed reviews from critics; while its atmosphere and aesthetics were praised, reviewers thought the gameplay was fitted into the narrative poorly.

== Gameplay and premise ==
A conversation between characters Lella and Olga, who are discussing departure for France.

Wheels of Aurelia takes place in 1978 and follows two women on a road trip along the Via Aurelia road. Lella, a feminist woman driving a sports car stops in a nightclub and finds Olga, who accompanies her for the journey to France, leaving behind the highly political and dangerous Italy. The pair have different reasons to leave the country; Lella is attempting to re-convene with her former kidnapper, whilst Olga is attempting to get to France to have an abortion. The game features topics including single parenthood, fascism and the Mafia.

From a bird's-eye view, the player controls the sports car Lella is driving. The vehicle drives forward automatically with the player able to increase the speed of the vehicle and switch lanes to navigate through traffic while simultaneously choosing dialogue options. The player visits locations between Rome and Viareggio but can visit additional locations during each playthrough. The player may change Lella's travel companions in the form of hitchhikers, and change the vehicle Lella is driving at these locations, based on the player's choice of dialogue. Experiences of the game can range from a car race against a stranger to robbing a bank. The game has 16 different endings based on player choice. From start to finish, game playthroughs can last around ten to fifteen minutes.

== Development and release ==
Wheels of Aurelia was designed and coded by Italian studio Santa Ragione's Pietro Righi Riva and Nicolò Tedeschi, with help from Double Fine Productions' Anna Kipnis. Kipnis was responsible for the game's dialogue design, a role she worked on with Double Fine Productions. It features Commedia all'italiana which the developers attempted to attach to the release. Designer, producer, and programmer Pietro Righi Riva, described the game as the "natural evolution" of the driving game mentality set out in the Out Run series, but suggested that the game did not fully capture the effortless driving they were looking for. Righi Riva noted the 1962 Italian film Il Sorpasso as the inspiration for the game and credited other driving games including 1993's World Rally Championship, and 1994's Great 1000 Miles Rally for inspiration of the visual aspects. Prior to its development, Righi Riva had discussed with co-developer Nicolò Sala regarding making a game set in Italy. Along with this, Righi Riva wanted to research how the country was in the generation before his.

The artwork was produced by multiple artists. Italian artist Flaminia Grimaldi was responsible for the game's environment, who contributed over 200 assets for its Italian landscape, whereas the characters were created by New Yorker Patrick Leger under the direction of the game's writers. Italian game designer couple We Are Müesli helped create the dialogue and provided voice artist recordings for all of the characters. The graphic design came from freelancer Luca Francesco Rossi.

Wheels of Aurelia was created using the Unity game engine, with pre-production starting in January 2014. The production was delayed until June 2015 for Santa Ragione to work on Fotonica, an action first-person runner, whilst still working on the imagery, movies, and music for Wheels of Aurelia. It was first released as a beta on Humble Bundle in the Humble Weekly Bundle: Fantastic Arcade. Known as the Fantastic Arcade Beta Edition, the game spent only four months in development to meet the deadline for the bundle and cut many features that had been originally planned for the project. A specially designed arcade cabinet was created to display the game at Fantastic Fest. The game later passed through Steam Greenlight and was released for Linux, OS X, and Windows on 20 September 2016. Versions for the PlayStation 4, Wii U, and Xbox One were announced, set to release on 4 October; the PlayStation 4 version was released as scheduled, and the Xbox One version on 18 November. It was ported to Android and iOS on 19 October 2016, and later onto Nintendo Switch via the Nintendo eShop on 2 November 2017.

== Reception ==
Reception

Aggregate score
Aggregator	Score
Metacritic	PC: 63/100; NS: 42/100

Review scores
Publication	Score
Edge	PC: 5/10
Eurogamer	PS4: 7/10
Game Informer	PC: 7/10
IGN	PS4: 8/10
The Games Machine	PC: 7/8/10
Switch Player	NS: 1.9/5

According to the review aggregator website Metacritic, the Windows version of Wheels of Aurelia received "mixed or average reviews", while the Switch version received "generally unfavorable reviews". Italy's Eurogamer's Manuel Stanislao reviewed the PlayStation version, was interested by the premise and the "captivating" soundtrack but stated it was only suitable for a niche audience. Rosa Piermarco writing for IGN Italy reviewed the PlayStation version, and was very positive about how unique an experience it was.

Critics praised Wheels of Aurelia's presentation and graphical interface. Gita Jackson for Kotaku was very positive about the graphics, noting it to capture the themes of Italian neorealist film despite being a modern game. Jackson also praised the game's atmosphere, commenting on the setting of Italian life during this period being particularly interesting. Piermarco of IGN Italy praised its graphics and art style, citing the "nice low poly graphics and two-dimensional portraits" of the characters being inspired by 1970s comics, likening them to Lanciostory and Skorpio Suriel Vazquez for review magazine Game Informer responded positively particularly on its immersion.

However, some reviews questioned the game's substance. Edge said it is a "shame the journey itself can't match the poignancy of the final destination". When reviewing the Nintendo Switch release, Switch Player's Liam Langan was disappointed for it being too short especially as one of the first visual novels on the platform. Langan also commented on the game's value for money, saying "Maybe if the game was longer I might’ve had more time to warm into the story and I may have been able to enjoy Wheels of Aurelia a little more." Liam Doolan's piece for Nintendo Life shared similar opinions, calling the visual novel aspects "lacklustre", but the gameplay "even worse". Vazquez cited the games' "aesthetically flawless" graphics and the "accurate historical reconstruction"; however, it was less appreciative of the driving mechanics and lack of real interaction with the story.
