= Starquake (video game) =

1984 video game

- Developer: Bubble Bus Software
- Publisher: Bubble Bus Software
- Designer: Stephen Crow
- Programmer: Stephen Crow
- Platforms: ZX Spectrum, Amstrad CPC, Atari 8-bit, Atari ST, BBC Micro, Commodore 64, MS-DOS, MSX, Tatung Einstein, Amiga
- Release: 1985: Spectrum, C64, MSX, Amstrad, Atari 8-bit, Einstein; 1987: BBC; 1988: Atari ST, IBM PC; 2018: Amiga
- Genre: Action-adventure
- Mode: Single-player

Starquake is an action-adventure platform game written by Stephen Crow for the ZX Spectrum and published by Bubble Bus Software in 1985. It was ported to the Commodore 64, MSX, Amstrad CPC, Atari 8-bit computers, Tatung Einstein in 1985, BBC Micro in 1987 and IBM compatibles and Atari ST in 1988.

== Plot ==
The player controls BLOB (Bio-Logically Operated Being), whose mission is to penetrate the unstable core of a rogue planet which has appeared from a black hole. If the core is not repaired within the set time limit, it will implode, causing a chain reaction which will destroy the entire universe. The planet is inhabited by various primitive creatures, all hazardous to the touch, and the remnants of a previous civilisation which provides the items needed to rebuild and stabilise the planet core.

== Gameplay ==
ZX Spectrum start screen

Within the game, there are multiple ways to get around:

- Running is the default.
- Hover platforms can be used to fly, but prevent BLOB from picking up items. BLOB can only mount and dismount hover platforms at docking stations.
- BLOB can build his own short-lived platforms to reach high places.
- BLOB can get through some trap like doors by creating platforms then dropping onto them after they disappear.
- There are some tube-shaped lifts which will lift BLOB upwards to the top. BLOB cannot enter these whilst on a hover platform.
- There are also teleport booths scattered around the play area, each with its own destination code.
- Secret passages allow BLOB to take short cuts from one part of the map to another. An infinite lives cheat printed by Your Sinclair inadvertently removed this ability.

BLOB is able to carry up to four items at once, using a FIFO arrangement. Some of the encountered items will be useful to repair the core, while others will need to be exchanged using a Cheops Pyramid for something more useful. There is an Access credit card, which can fill in for any of the numbered chips needed to get through security doors, and for using the aforementioned Pyramid. There is also a Key which can be used to open doors.

As well as items needed to repair the core, the Access card and Key, there are items which will top up BLOB's energy, his platform building capacity or his firepower. There is also one cylinder like object which will top up whichever level is lowest, and even add a life if BLOB is down to his last. BLOB can also top up his lives by collecting joysticks which represent an extra life.

Points are scored for shooting the various moving hazardous creatures, worth between 80 and 320 points each, and 10,000 points per core item replaced. 250 points are scored each time BLOB enters a new screen. There are also other hazards, dangerous spikes and energy fields which will kill BLOB on contact, as will the mines that move around like the creatures.

The game features 512 screens. The placement of the objects, and the identities of those needed to fix the core are randomized at the start of the game. The map/screens including locations of teleport booths remain fixed as do their destination codes. There are nine core elements to replace in order to complete the game.

== Reception ==
Reception

Review score
| Publication | Score |
|---|---|
| Crash | 96% |

Awards
| Publication | Award |
|---|---|
| Crash | Crash Smash |
| C+VG | Game of the Month |

The ZX Spectrum version was ranked 27th in the Your Sinclair Official Top 100 Games of All Time and 10th in Retro Gamer magazine's "Top 25:Spectrum Games".
