= Zigurat (company) =

Spanish video game development company

Zigurat was a Spanish software house for 8-bit home computers very popular in the eighties. Its origin is in the company Made in Spain, founded in 1983, which would know massive success in Spain with Fred, commercialized in the United Kingdom as Roland on the Ropes (only the Amstrad CPC version). When the programmers and owners of Made in Spain could not go on alone on the task of distribution, they decided to create in 1986 another company, Zigurat, which would be entirely dedicated to distribution, and would distribute all the titles by Made in Spain, which became an internal producer seal under Zigurat. They would also distribute games by independent programmers or companies and would allow Made in Spain to concretate solely on programming. Later on, Made in Spain would completely merge into Zigurat, creating a single producer and distributor company. When the 8-bit market disappeared, the company turned to develop games for arcade machines.

== Games published ==
- Fred
- Sir Fred
- El Misterio del Nilo
- Humphrey
- París-Dakar
- Poder Oscuro
- Comando Quatro
- Emilio Sánchez Vicario Grand Slam
- Arkos
- Poder Oscuro
- Curro Jiménez
- Power Magic
- Senda Salvaje
- Jungle Warrior
- Piso Zero
- Don Kin Kong
- Sito Pons 500cc Grand Prix
- Carlos Sainz: World Rally Championship

== Developing groups ==
The company had several developing groups associated:

- Made in Spain
- Arcadia
- Gamesoft
- Truesoft
- Turbo 16
