= Sandstorm (video game) =

1992 video game

- Developer: Pod Bay Enterprises
- Publishers: MVP Software; Personal Companion Software
- Designer: David A. Johndrow
- Platform: MS-DOS
- Release: 1992
- Genre: Shoot 'em up
- Mode: Single-player

Sandstorm, also released as Desert Storm Command, is a shoot 'em up video game developed by David A. Johndrow for MS-DOS and published in 1992. The player defends their home base from bomb-dropping planes, Patriot missiles, and Scud missiles. If a missile or bomb touches the ground, some of the buildings in the base are damaged. Each building can be damaged three times. In other missions, a missile can be directed into designated enemy buildings.

Screenshot
