= Star Trek: The Kobayashi Alternative =

1985 video game

- Cover art by Robert Pearlman
- Developer: Micromosaics
- Publisher: Simon & Schuster
- Designers: Mark Sutton-Smith; Alain Benzaken
- Artist: Josie Koehne
- Writer: Diane Duane
- Platforms: Apple II, Commodore 64, Macintosh, IBM PC
- Release: 1985
- Genre: Text adventure
- Mode: Single-player

Star Trek: The Kobayashi Alternative is a Star Trek themed text adventure computer game published in 1985 by Simon & Schuster.

== Description ==
Captain Hikaru Sulu, on his first command assignment aboard the heavy cruiser U.S.S. Robert A. Heinlein, has vanished, along with his crew and vessel. The player assumes the role of Admiral James T. Kirk, who has been assigned by Starfleet Command to take the Enterprise and find out what happened.

The plot is based on the idea that Starfleet is replacing the Kobayashi Maru scenario with a new test based on a mission from the Enterprise logs. The player is supposedly testing this "Kobayashi Alternative Command Performance Evaluation" for a Starfleet admiral.

== Publication history ==
In the mid-1980s, the American studio Micromosaics Productions created a text adventure based on the Star Trek franchise, with text and story created by Diane Duane. The game was then designed by Mark Sutton-Smith and Allan Benzaken, and programmed by Warren Zucker and Sonam Gyato for Apple II, Commodore 64, Macintosh and IBM PC. It was published by Simon & Schuster in 1985.

== Reception ==
Computer Gaming World's Scorpia criticized Kobayashi for many bugs and poor documentation, while approving of the game's design and its portrayal of the crew. She reported that version 1.1 for the Apple with improved documentation still had bugs, including a serious one when visiting Orna, and concluded "I cannot recommend it". Joyce Worley in Ahoy! called the Commodore 64 version's user interface "a landmark advance for the text adventure genre". She said that the story "would probably work well as the basis for a Star Trek script", but was less interesting than the opportunity to explore the Enterprise and interact with its crew.

In Issue 3 of the game magazine Gateways, Jack Trainman found that "the nuts and bolts of the program leave much to be desired. The game starts you off with absolutely no ideas on how to command a starship." Trainman also pointed out "The familiar actions that most fans of Star Trek love to see on late-night TV simply don't apply to this game ... Kirk has to constantly order people to move and take readings for him, since he can't walk and hold a tricorder at the same time. (And this is an Admiral?) The crew members do nothing except follow orders - hardly in the TV or movie tradition." Noting that newer versions of the game now included a procedures manual and a hint book, Trainway concluded, "I recommend that you find the newest version of Star Trek: The Kubayashi Alternative, and have a lot of patience. Sulu isn't going anywhere."
