= Star Fleet II: Krellan Commander =

1989 video game

- Developer: Interstel
- Publisher: Interstel
- Platform: MS-DOS
- Release: 1989

Star Fleet II: Krellan Commander is a video game released for MS-DOS in 1989. It is the sequel to Star Fleet I: The War Begins.

== Gameplay ==
Star Fleet II: Krellan Commander allows players to command a Krellan battlecruiser with small complement of escort vessels. Like Star Fleet I, Star Fleet II has an officer ranking system using some Roman style names. The sequel improved the graphic appeal, allowed for players to conquer planets, take over enemy starships (commanding Krellan shock troops to go various levels of the ship) and so forth.

== Development ==
This sequel to Star Fleet I was published in 1989 by Interstel Corporation, but was only in production for a few months due to internal problems at Interstel. The game was much more complex and sophisticated than Star Fleet I. It involved many different ship types, including battlecruisers, destroyers, heavy and light cruisers, frigates, troop transports, freighters, scouts, and starliners. Fleet operations were possible and the universe included hundreds of planets to utilize or conquer. It was only released for MS-DOS. Versions for the Atari ST and Amiga were under development and never finished.

The game was designed and written by Trevor Sorensen and Mark Baldwin, with a planet fractal generator by Dennis Lawler.

The game was released with bugs and needed a patch to be completely operational, but Computer Gaming World reported in 1992 that Interstel "never did get it to run correctly" and that the game's bugs "destroyed the parent company". The DOS version of the game can now be found as freeware. Some of the freeware versions of the game are the original flawed game (version 1.0) and not the final patched version (version 1.5B).

In 2018 the original developer, Trevor Sorensen, started to work on Star Fleet II again. In 2020, he released Version 1.5C to playtesters in January. This version had many new features and bug fixes to the previous Version 1.5B. Version 1.5D arrived in March, with even more new features and bug fixes, to playtesters. A more advanced Version 1.6 was released in December. Star Fleet II Version 2.0 was released in November 2023 for sale on Steam and GOG.com.

== Reception ==
Reception

Review scores
Publication	Score
Computer Gaming World	0/5
Dragon	4/5

The game was reviewed in 1990 in Dragon #154 by Hartley, Patricia and Kirk Lesser in "The Role of Computers" column. The reviewers gave the game 4 out of 5 stars. M. Evans Brooks of Computer Gaming World in 1989 gave the game a mixed review, praising the rich gameplay but noting that a number of bugs and other flaws marred the experience. Brooks also criticized the "primitive" ASCII graphics, slow load times between menus, and the need for a "Tutorial Disk and Training Manual" which was sold separately. In a 1992 survey of science fiction games, Brooks was harsher, giving the title one of five stars and calling it "the stereotypical sequel — i.e. awful" because of the unfixed flaws. A 1994 survey by Brooks of strategic space games set in the year 2000 and later gave the game zero stars, calling it "almost indescribably awful ... sufficiently undeveloped as to destroy the parent company".

In 1996, Computer Gaming World declared Star Fleet II the 7th-worst computer game ever released.
