= Spellbound! =

1991 video game

- Developer(s): The Learning Company
- Publisher(s): The Learning Company
- Platform(s): Apple II, MS-DOS, Windows 3.1x, Windows, Mac
- Release: 1991: MS-DOS; 1993: Apple II; 1995: Win, Mac
- Genre(s): Educational
- Mode(s): Single-player

Spellbound! is an educational computer game made and distributed by The Learning Company aimed at teaching spelling, vocabulary, and language development to children ages 7 to 12 years. The objective of the game is to play spelling-related games to qualify and compete for successively higher bracket spelling bees, concluding with the player competing in the national spelling bee. The original game, released in 1991, was compatible with computers running DOS 3.3 or higher. A 1995 CD release added spoken dialogue and was compatible with Windows 95 and Mac.

== Plot ==
Morty Maxwell along with his robots are entering Shady Glen school's Spelling Bee in the hopes of outspelling everyone. The Super Solvers aim to sharpen their skills and beat Morty at his own game in Washington, D.C., with the aid of a Spellbinder computer.

== Gameplay ==
Before starting the game, the player can choose which topics and word lists to use. Additionally, the player can create customized lists. Then the player can choose one of three difficulty levels, which affect how many spelling problems need to be solved throughout the game. To qualify for a spelling bee, the player must first earn a set number of points by playing spelling-related activities. These activities include:

- Criss Cross (also called "Work it out!") – a crossword-type puzzle
- Flash Cards (also called "Watch it Flash!") – where the player must recall the word shown
- Word search (also called "Find them All!") – finding words hidden in a box of letters

Once in the spelling bee (also called "Take a Trip!"), the player will be contested by two other players and must correctly type words flashed out or vocally spoken to win the game. When the spelling bee is completed, the player moves on to the next level to prepare for another spelling bee. There are five levels of spelling bees in the game. As the levels get higher, the activities become harder.

== Release ==
Spellbound! was released along with an Adlib Sound Card in "The Learning Company's Family Sound Value Pack".

== Reception ==
Reception

Awards
Publication	Award
Technology & Learning	Software Award of Excellence 1992
Consumer Electronics Show	Innovations Award 1992

Spellbound! was reviewed in the Oppenheim Toy Portfolio Guide Book where it was praised for its "state of the arts" graphics and sound support. The reviewers noted that it takes a lot to make learning how to spell fun, "but the Learning Company has done it!" Moderately well received, the game received two and a half stars out of five from Allgame.
