= Home of the Underdogs =

Abandonware archive

- Site as of 14 May 2006
- Website type: Abandonware video games
- Owner: Sarinee Achavanuntakul
- Website: http://www.the-underdogs.org (archived); Defunct; multiple revivals exist (see below)
- Registration: Not required
- Launched: September 1998/April 2009
- Current status: Original website defunct; succeeded by multiple third-party mirrors/revivals
- Content license: CC BY-NC-SA

Home of the Underdogs (often shortened to HotU) is an abandonware archive founded by Sarinee Achavanuntakul, in October 1998.

Before shutting down the original version in 2009, the site provided reviews for over 5,300 games and offered downloads of software and manuals for a number of games that were no longer commercially available. This made it a resource for players who lost the original discs or manuals. While a majority of games available on the site were for MS-DOS or Windows, the site also contained a section with games for other platforms. Where downloads for these games were provided, they were usually present in formats compatible with emulators. The site also had scans of several gamebook series, many of them complete. In addition to commercial titles, the site contained hundreds of freeware titles.

== History ==
=== Homeoftheunderdogs.org ===
Achavanuntakul, a Thai journalist, had been in the United States at that time and wanted to play MicroProse's 1989 title Sword of the Samurai, as her copy had fallen apart. However, by 1998, MicroProse no longer was selling any copies of the title, forcing Achavanuntakul to seek out a copy through an abandonware webring, eventually coming across the title offered to be played through emulation. She was surprised that other older, popular titles such as Infocom and Quantum Quality Productions were not available through these sites, and took it upon herself to launch "Home of the Underdogs" that October, a more permanent site for users to obtain abandonware. Initially, she had about 20 games offered but within a few months, had gained help from others to expand to about 80 games.

Around that time, her web hosting service Xoom took down the site without warning, given the issue of copyrights with abandonware. She relaunched early in 1999, now providing the files under a .bmp extension rather than .zip to avoid attracting Xoom's notice. By the time the site had gotten to around 400 titles, Xoom permanently deleted the site, but Achavanuntakul had many offers for help from users around the globe to provide a more permanent hosting solution. At about the same time, her site gained attention from the Interactive Digital Software Association (IDSA), the former name of the current Entertainment Software Association (ESA), the video game industry's trade organization. The IDSA saw the offering of abandonware as a copyright violation for those publishers they represented, and Achavanuntakul complied with their requests by removing links to the software offered to otherwise keep the site going.

In January 2006, due to new responsibilities at work, Achavanuntakul had to step off running the site, allowing other admins to continue to maintain it.

=== Hotud.org ===
In early 2009, Home of the Underdogs had difficulty maintaining funding for its hosting duties, which led to the website's shutdown. As the database of HOTU was released under a CC BY-NC-SA Creative Commons license in March 2009, a team had been able to rehost the website as hotud.org by September 2009. At the same time, the site established a partnership with GOG.com, a digital storefront that offered digital rights management-free games, to promote and offer some of the classic games that Underdogs had through GOG.com. Despite difficulties with providing direct access to abandonware, the new maintainers tried to reproduce the site's databases and reviews for these early video games. The hotud.org site maintainers warned in February 2014 that financing for the servers was becoming difficult and they may need to take it offline. Hotud.org went offline in June 2017.

=== Homeoftheunderdogs.net ===
A new version of the website became available at homeoftheunderdogs.net from September 2009 and remains active as of April 2026.

== Impact ==
While the legitimacy of abandonware with respect to copyrights remains in question, several game developers who had designed the games that were offered at "Home of the Underdogs", such as Chris Crawford, had written to Achavanuntakul to thank her for helping their games to be introduced to new players. Several more recent game developers including Derek Yu and Ben "Yahtzee" Croshaw credit Home of the Underdogs for helping them to get interested in video game development. The site was considered critical towards helping with digital preservation, since most publishers at the time did not keep materials of games that they had taken out of print.
