= List of Western video games =

Video games set in the Old West or that are defined by a Western style have a long, varied history, existing since the beginning of the medium. The earliest of these included The Oregon Trail (1971), and established microprocessors in arcade cabinets (Gun Fight) and the shooter genre in general (Boot Hill). As Game Informer explained the category's enduring appeal, "Gun-toting bad asses and video games go together like a horse and carriage - as long as that carriage is on fire and being pursued by murderous outlaws."

== Traditional Westerns ==
Title	Release date	Platform(s)	Developer(s)/Publisher(s)	Notes
3 Skulls of the Toltecs	1996	Windows, MS-DOS	Revistronic	Point-and-click game.
12 is Better Than 6	2015	Windows, Linux	Pinkapp Games	Top-down action video game.
Al Emmo and the Lost Dutchman's Mine	2006	Windows, Linux, iOS	Himalaya Studios	2D point-and-click adventure. 2015 iOS version is discontinued.
America	2001	Windows, OS X, Linux	Data Becker	Real-time strategy game.
Back to the Future Part III	1991	Mega Drive/Genesis, Amiga, Amstrad CPC, Atari ST, Commodore 64, MS-DOS, Master System, ZX Spectrum	Image Works, Mirrorsoft	
Back to the Future Part II & III	September 1990	NES	Beam Software, LJN	The Part III portion takes place in the Old West.
Badlands	1984	Arcade	Konami	
Bakushou Yoshimoto No Shinkigeki	1994	PC-Engine Super CD-ROM²	Hudson Soft	One world has a Western theme.
Bank Panic	1984	Amstrad CPC, Arcade, Commodore 64 (as West Bank), SG-1000, MSX, Master System, ZX Spectrum (as West Bank)	Sega	
Big Challenge! Gun Fighter	1989	Famicom Disk System	Jaleco	
Billy the Kid Returns!	1993	MS-DOS	Alive Software	
Blood Bros.	1990	Arcade	(Europe) (Japan) TAD Corporation (United States) Fabtek	
Boot Hill	1977	Arcade	Midway Games	Wild West-themed arcade shooter game.
Boot Hill Heroes	2014	Windows, Xbox 360, PlayStation Mobile	Experimental Gamer Studios	Role-playing game set in a Spaghetti Western-style world.
Boot Hill Bounties	2017	Windows, Nintendo Switch	Experimental Gamer Studios	Sequel to Boot Hill Heroes.
Call of Juarez	2006	Windows, Xbox 360	Ubisoft; Focus Home Interactive; Ascaron	First-person shooter; first in a four-game series.
Call of Juarez: Bound in Blood	2009	Windows, PlayStation 3, Xbox 360	Ubisoft, Techland	A prequel to Call of Juarez.
Call of Juarez: Gunslinger	2013	Windows, PlayStation 3, Xbox 360	Ubisoft, Techland	
Cheyenne	1984	Arcade	Exidy	
Cowboy Kid	1991	NES	Romstar	
Custer's Revenge	1982	Atari 2600	Mystique	
Cowboy Life Simulator	November 26, 2025	Windows	Odd Qubit, RockGame S.A.	3D 19th-century American sim with survival, farming & FPS elements.
Day Dreamin' Davey	1992	NES	HAL Laboratory	One of Davey's dream sequences takes place in the Old West.
Dead Man's Hand	2004	Windows, Xbox	Atari SA	
Desperados: Wanted Dead or Alive	2001	Windows	Infogrames	Real-time tactics game.
Desperados 2: Cooper's Revenge	2006	Windows	Atari	
Desperados III	2020	Windows, PlayStation 4, Xbox One, macOS, Linux	Mimimi Games, THQ Nordic	Real-time tactics video game.
Don't Die In The West	2023	Windows	Funday Games	Isometric, cartoony, 3D open-world cowboy sim & RPG with ranch management set in the Old West. Up to 1-4 players.
Dust: A Tale of the Wired West	1995	Windows, Mac	CyberFlix, GTE Entertainment	Point-and-click Western adventure game.
Duster (video game)	2023	Windows	Coldrice Games	Top-down American West roguelite with 2D retro graphics, many dangers & random areas.
Express Raider	1986	Arcade, Amstrad CPC, Commodore 64, ZX Spectrum	Data East, Amstrad CPC, U.S. Gold	Aka. Western Express (JP). Includes side-scrolling beat 'em up atop train carriages, and shooting gallery with horse riding.
Far West	2002	Windows	Greenwood Entertainment, JoWooD Productions	Real-time strategy with cattle & town management.
Fast Draw: Showdown	1994	Arcade, Windows, PlayStation 3, Wii	American Laser Games	Live-action rail shooter. Modern ports released between 2006 and 2011.
Fester Mudd: Curse of the Gold	2013	Linux, Mac, Windows, Ouya, iOS, Android	Replay Games	Point-and-click adventure game.
Fistful of Frags	2007	Linux, Mac, Windows	FoF Dev Team	Multiplayer Western-themed mod for Half-Life 2.
Freddy Pharkas: Frontier Pharmacist	1993	MS-DOS, Windows, Mac	Sierra On-Line	Western comedy adventure game.
Gold Rush!	1988	Amiga, Apple II, Apple IIGS, Atari ST, MS-DOS, Windows, Mac	Sierra On-Line	Graphic adventure about the California Gold Rush. Windows release in 2014.
GRIT (video game)	2023	Windows	Team GRIT	Third-person NFT, 3D MP shooter.
Gun	November 8, 2005	Xbox, Xbox 360, PlayStation 2, PSP; PC, GameCube	Activision	
Gun Fight	1975	Arcade, Bally Astrocade, Atari 8-bit, Commodore 64, Commodore 128	(Japan) Taito (United States) Midway	First video game to depict human-to-human combat.
Gun.Smoke	1985	Arcade, NES	(Japan) Capcom (United States) Romstar	
Gunfighter: The Legend of Jesse James	2001	PlayStation	Ubisoft	
Gunfighter II: Revenge of Jesse James	2003	PlayStation 2	Ubisoft	
Gunfright	1986	ZX Spectrum, Amstrad CPC, MSX	U.S. Gold	
Gunman Clive	2014	Windows	Hörberg Productions	
Heated Barrel	1992	Arcade	Tad Corporation	Overhead side-scrolling shoot 'em up.
Helldorado	2009	Windows	Viva Media	Sequel to the 2006 game Desperados 2: Cooper's Revenge.
High Noon	1984	Commodore 64	Ocean Software	
INSANE WEST	2019	Windows	JIGUANGGamestudio	2.5D side-scrolling platformer & behind-shoulders survival mode with minimalist graphics.
Ironhorse	1985	Arcade	Konami	
Jewels of the Wild West	2020	Android, iOS, Mac, Windows, PC	G5 Entertainment	Wild West-themed game that combines match-3 gameplay with city building.
Kane	1986	Commodore 64	Mastertronic	
The Last Bounty Hunter	1994	Arcade, MS-DOS, 3DO, CD-i, DVD player, Wii, PlayStation 3	American Laser Games	Live-action rail shooter. It got 2000's re-releases for DVD, PC, arcade, Wii, then the PS3 in 2013.
Law of the West	1985	Apple II, Commodore 64, NES	Accolade	
Lead and Gold: Gangs of the Wild West	2010	Windows, Xbox 360, PlayStation 3	Paradox Interactive	Multiplayer team-based third-person shooter.
Lethal Enforcers II: Gun Fighters	1994	Arcade, Mega Drive/Genesis, Sega CD	Konami	Light gun arcade shooter.
The Lone Ranger	August 1991	Nintendo Entertainment System	Konami	
Lost Dutchman Mine	1989	Amiga, Atari ST, MS-DOS	Magnetic Images	Simulation game with top down overworld exploration, side-scrolling levels view, & 1st-person view poker game.
Lucky Luke	1998	Windows, PlayStation	Infogrames	
Lucky Luke: The Video Game	1996	CD-i	Philips Media, SPC Vision B.V.	
Lucky Luke: On the Dalton's Trail	1998	Windows, PlayStation	Infogrames	
Lucky Luke: Desperado Train	2000	GBC	Infogrames	
Lucky Luke: Wanted!	2001	GBA	Infogrames	
Lucky Luke: Western Fever	2001	Windows, PlayStation	Infogrames	
Lucky Luke: Outlaws	2006	J2ME	MFORMA Group Inc.	Shooting gallery game based on the Lucky Luke comics series.
Mad Dog McCree	1990	Arcade	American Laser Games	Live-action rail shooter.
Mad Dog II: The Lost Gold	1992	Arcade, Sega CD, 3DO, CD-i, MS-DOS	American Laser Games	Live-action rail shooter.
The Oregon Trail	December 3, 1971	Mainframe, Apple II, Atari 8-bit, Commodore 64, Sol-20	MECC, The Learning Company	First released for mainframe computers long before the home computer ports.
The Oregon Trail	1985	Apple II, Mac, MS-DOS, Microsoft Windows	MECC	
Oregon Trail II	February 8, 1995	Mac OS, Microsoft Windows	MECC, SoftKey Multimedia	
The Oregon Trail 3rd Edition	November 1997	Mac OS 7.5, Windows 95	The Learning Company (TLC Properties Inc.)	
The Oregon Trail 4th Edition	1999	Mac OS 7.5, Windows 95	The Learning Company (TLC Properties Inc.) (Riverdeep, Inc.), Selectsoft (Selectsoft Publishing)	
The Oregon Trail 5th Edition	April 1, 2001	Mac OS 8.6, Windows 98	Broderbund (Riverdeep, Inc., LLC), The Learning Company (Riverdeep, Inc., LLC), Selectsoft (Selectsoft Publishing)	
The Oregon Trail	March 11, 2009	Android, BlackBerry, iOS, Java ME, Nintendo DSi, Windows Mobile	Gameloft Shanghai, Gameloft New York, Gameloft	
The Oregon Trail: American Settler	November 17, 2011	fireOS, iOS	Gameloft	
The Oregon Trail	2021	Apple Arcade, Microsoft Windows, Nintendo Switch, PlayStation 4, PlayStation 5, Xbox One, Xbox Series X/S	Gameloft Brisbane, Gameloft	
Outlaw	1976	Arcade	Atari, Inc.	
Outlaw	1978	Atari 2600	Atari, Inc.	
Outlaws	1985	Commodore 64	Ultimate	
Outlaws	1997	PC	LucasArts	
Pioneer Lands	2011	IOS, PC, Mac, Android	Nevosoft	
Pecos Bill	1991	CD-i	Rabbit Ears Productions	Interactive storybook that included games for early childhood development. Narrated by Robin Williams & music by Ry Cooder.
Red Dead Revolver	May 4, 2004	PlayStation 2, Xbox	Rockstar Games	
Red Dead Redemption	May 18, 2010	PlayStation 3, Xbox 360	Rockstar Games	Spiritual successor to Red Dead Revolver.
Red Dead Redemption 2	October 26, 2018	PlayStation 4, Xbox One, PC, Stadia	Rockstar Games	Prequel to Red Dead Redemption.
Retro Classix: Express Raider	2021	Windows	Ziggurat Interactive, 612 Games	Re-release of 1986 arcade original.
Rodeo Judge	2015	Android, iOS	Rodeo Judge LLC	Rodeo-themed card game invented by champion rider, Scott Mendes.
Sheriff	1979	Arcade	Nintendo	Multidirectional arcade shooter.
Shootout at Old Tucson	1994	Arcade	American Laser Games	Limited release live-action rail shooter with 2-player support. 3DO port was cancelled.
Sierra Madre	2018	Windows	Broken Dream Studio	Open-world Western survival game set in the 1870s.
Six-Gun Shootout	1985	Commodore 64	Strategic Simulations	
Smokin' Guns	2009	Linux, Windows, macOS, AmigaOS 4	Smokin' Guns Productions	Free Spaghetti Western FPS built on Quake III engine.
Sunset Riders	1991	Arcade, Mega Drive/Genesis, Super NES	Konami	Has a layout similar to the games Mystic Warriors (1993) and Wild West C.O.W.-Boys of Moo Mesa (1992).
The Tin Star	1983	Arcade	Taito	Multidirectional shooter.
The Town with No Name	1992	Amiga CDTV, MS-DOS	On-Line Entertainment Ltd., Prism Leisure Corporation	Point-and-click adventure with garish graphics.
The Westerner	2003	Windows	Planeta DeAgostini	Graphic adventure game.
The Yukon Trail	1994	Windows, System 7	MECC	Educational point-and-click adventure game about the Klondike Gold Rush.
Wanted	1984	Arcade	Sigma Enterprises	Third-person gallery shooter. 1-2 players support.
Wanted	1989	Master System	Sega	
Westerado: Double Barreled	2015	Xbox One, Windows, Mac OS	Adult Swim Games	A 2D, third-person, revenge Western action-adventure. Based on 2013 browser game.
Western Games	1987	Amstrad CPC, Atari ST, Commodore 64, Amiga	Magic Bytes, DROsoft	Pack of 6 mini games against an AI or human player.
Western Outlaw: Wanted Dead or Alive	2003	Windows	Groove Games	Primitive LithTech Talon-powered FPS.
Western Gun	1975	Arcade, Astrocade, Atari 8-bit	Taito, Midway Manufacturing	Multidirectional arcade shooter & the 1st video game to depict human-to-human combat.
Western Gun Part II (Modified)	1980	Arcade	Taito	Multidirectional arcade shooter. Modified version of Nintendo's Sheriff.
Westlanders	2026	Microsoft Windows, PlayStation 5, Xbox Series X/S	The Breach Studios, Radical Theory	
Westward	2006	iPhone, Palm OS, Symbian, Windows, Windows Mobile	Sandlot Games	Real-time strategy similar to the Settlers series.
Westward II: Heroes of the Frontier	2008	macOS, Windows	Sandlot Games	First in series to have full 3D graphics.
Westward III: Gold Rush	2009	macOS, Windows	Sandlot Games	
Westward IV: All Aboard	2009	macOS, Windows	Sandlot Games	Has a railroads focus.
Wild Gunman	1974	Arcade, Famicom, NES	Nintendo	A 1984 light gun shooter adapted from a 1974 EM arcade game.
Wild West Builder	2023 (TBA)	Windows	G11 S.A.	3D Old West city-builder with railroads.
Wild West Dynasty	February 16, 2023	Windows	Moon Punch Studio, Toplitz Productions	3D city-builder & survival sim in 19th century American West.
Wild West Guns	2008	Wii, iOS, Mobile phone	Gameloft	Light gun/shooting gallery game.
Wild West Guns (Mobile)	2011	Mobile phone	Gameloft	From the same publisher but different to the 2008/2009 versions. 2011 mobile port was a 2D top-down action-adventure.
Wild West Online: Gunfighter	2008	Windows, Mac	Tenderfoot Games	Free-to-play multiplayer online dueling game. Spun off from Wild West Online MMO.
Wild Western	1982	Arcade, FM-7, PC-88, Sharp X1	Taito	Top-down shooter. On horseback, must prevent 3 bandits from boarding the train.
Wild West Pioneers	2026	Microsoft Windows	EmpireCraft Studios, Toplitz Productions	
Wild Wild West: The Steel Assassin	December 7, 1999	Windows	SouthPeak Interactive	An action-adventure game sequel to Wild Wild West, set in 1870.
Wyatt Earp's Old West	1994	Windows 3.x, Mac	Grolier	Educational adventure game with an arcade shooter mode & digitized visuals.

== Non-traditional Westerns ==
This section is for Western games that have non-traditional themes or hybrid genres such as Space Western, Sci-fi West, Fantasy Western, Hybrid Western (e.g. Horror Western, Film noir, Martial arts (genre), anthropomorphic animal characters), neo-Western (Contemporary settings/times), Post-apocalyptic West, Weird West (Also can have supernatural, steampunk, superhero themes), among many others. It is probably okay to leave 'spaghetti westerns' and some other mixed genres in the traditional section.
See this List of Western subgenres for a comprehensive rundown on numerous types of alternate Westerns.

Title	Release date	Platform(s)	Developer(s)/Publisher(s)	Notes
Above Snakes	2023	Windows	Crytivo	Old West-inspired polygonal, isometric, sandbox, survival base-builder with zombies.
Alentejo: Tinto's Law	2025	Game Boy, Game Boy Pocket, Game Boy Color, Game Boy Advance Windows, web-browser	(Europe) Teknamic Software	A humorous, top-down Western adventure set in the 19th-century Iberian Peninsula.
Alone in the Dark 3	1995	MS-DOS, Mac OS, Windows, PC-98	(Europe) Infogrames (United States) Interplay	Third-person Wild West survival horror with zombies.
An American Tail: Fievel Goes West	1994	Super NES, MS-DOS	Hudson Soft	Platformer based on a namesake 1991 animation starring a biped mouse.
An American Tail: Fievel's Gold Rush	2002	GBA	(Europe) Conspiracy Entertainment (United States) Crave Entertainment	Platformer based on an animated film series starring a biped mouse.
Bang! Howdy	2006	Java	Three Rings Design	Strategy game with Western, steampunk, and Native American mythology.
Blood	1997	MS-DOS	GT Interactive	Player is a gunslinger from the Old West. Has occult & horror themes.
Blood West	2023	Windows, Linux	Hyperstrange S.A.	Unity-powered retro 3D, sandbox stealth FPS set in dark levels with a jumbled mess of supernatural horror and Wild West themes.
Call of Juarez: The Cartel	2011	Windows, PlayStation 3, Xbox 360	Ubisoft, Techland	An example of the neo-Western genre.
Damnation	2009	Windows, PlayStation 3, Xbox 360	Codemasters	Steampunk alternate universe western set after the American Civil War.
Darkwatch	2005	PlayStation 2, Xbox	Capcom	Horror game set in the Old West about a vampire outlaw named Jericho Cross.
Dillon's Rolling Western	2012	Nintendo 3DS	Nintendo	Player controls an anthropomorphic armadillo fighting against rock-like monsters.
Disney Infinity	August 18, 2013	iOS, Microsoft Windows, Nintendo 3DS, PlayStation 3, Wii, Wii U, Xbox 360	Avalanche Software, Heavy Iron Studios, Disney Interactive Studios, Namco Bandai Games	Features content from The Lone Ranger.
Disney Infinity 2.0	September 23, 2014	Android, iOS, Microsoft Windows, PlayStation 3, PlayStation 4, PlayStation Vita, Wii U, Xbox 360, Xbox One	Avalanche Software, Heavy Iron Studios, Disney Interactive Studios	Features content from The Lone Ranger.
Disney Infinity 3.0	August 30, 2015	Android, Apple TV, iOS, Microsoft Windows, PlayStation 3, PlayStation 4, Wii U, Xbox 360, Xbox One	Avalanche Software, Heavy Iron Studios, Disney Interactive Studios	Features content from The Lone Ranger.
DRAKE	2025 (TBA)	Windows, Mac OS, Linux	Solarsuit Games	Unity-powered 3D futuristic, Sci-fi/Space Western, top-down action RPG set on an arid exoplanet.
Evil West	2022	Windows, PlayStation 4, Xbox One, PlayStation 5, Xbox Series X/S	Focus Entertainment	Non-traditional Western third-person shooter.
ExeKiller	2025 (TBA)	Windows	Paradark Studio	UE4-powered retro-futuristic, post-apocalyptic, Western FPS with driveable vehicles.
Exoplanet: First Contact	2016	Windows	Grab the Games	Space western role-playing game.
Fallout	1997	Windows	Interplay	Post-apocalyptic action RPG set in the Southern California.
Fallout 2	1998	Windows	Black Isle Studios, Interplay	Post-apocalyptic action RPG set in Northern California, with areas in Nevada and Oregon.
Fallout: New Vegas	2010	Windows, PlayStation 3, Xbox 360	Obsidian Entertainment, Bethesda Softworks	Post-apocalyptic action RPG set in the Mojave Desert.
Fiend Hunter	1993	PC-Engine Super CD-ROM	Right Stuff Corp.	Non-traditional Western, side-scrolling action RPG.
God Hand	2006	PlayStation 2	Capcom	A 3D beat 'em up with Martial arts Western, Japanese-style comedy and demons.
Gunman's Proof	1997	SFC	ASCII	The game uncannily resembles The Legend of Zelda: A Link to the Past, but with a Sci-fi West theme.
Hard West	2015	Windows, Mac OS, Linux, Nintendo Switch	Gambitious Digital Entertainment	Turn-based tactics game with a supernatural western theme and isometric perspective.
Hard West 2	2022	Windows	Good Shepherd Entertainment	Same publisher as Hard West 1 but with a new name. Windows only.
Live A Live	1994	SFC	Square	One of the game's chapters is set in the Wild West.
Live A Live (Remake)	2022	Nintendo Switch	Square Enix	Remake with new graphics and different camera view. First official localisation for worldwide markets.
Oddworld: Stranger's Wrath	2005	Xbox, PlayStation 3	Oddworld Inhabitants	A 3D action-adventure starring a bounty-hunting oviparous anthropoid.
Rabbids Hollywood	2018	Arcade	Adrenaline Amusements	Light gun arcade game in the Rabbids franchise for 1-4 players. Set in 3 movie sets: Wild West, Zombie and Sci-Fi, with 3 levels each.
Red Steel 2	2010	Wii	Ubisoft	Mix between western and samouraï genres, with some modern architecture.
Rising Zan: The Samurai Gunman	1999	PlayStation	Agetec	Mix between western and samouraï genres.
Samurai Western	2005	PlayStation 2	Acquire Games	Mix between western and samouraï genres. Title from the Way of the Samurai series.
Silverload	1995	PC, PlayStation	(Europe) Psygnosis (United States) Vic Tokai	Graphic adventure game with horror elements.
Six-Guns	2011	iOS, Android, Windows Phone, Windows 8	Gameloft	Third-person, open-world action-adventure with supernatural themes.
SteamWorld Dig	2013	Nintendo 3DS, Windows, OS X, Linux, PlayStation 4, PlayStation Vita, Xbox One, Wii U, Nintendo Switch	Image & Form	A 2D side-scrolling, Metroidvania platformer with steam-powered robots.
SteamWorld Dig 2	2017	Nintendo Switch, Windows, macOS, Linux, PlayStation 4, PlayStation Vita, Nintendo 3DS	Image & Form	A 2D side-scrolling, Metroidvania platformer with steam-powered robots.
SteamWorld Tower Defense	2010	DSiWare	Image & Form	Cartoonish, isometric tower defense game set in a Western mining town with steam-powered robots; & the 1st SteamWorld series title.
Tengai Makyo: The Apocalypse IV	1997	Sega Saturn, PlayStation Portable	Hudson Soft	Top-down, supernatural horror JRPG set in a fictionalized & anachronized version of 1890s America. PSP version first released in 2006.
The Gunstringer	2011	Xbox 360	Twisted Pixel Games, Microsoft Studios	Kinect third-person rail shooter starring an undead marionette sheriff. Set in Old West, with some modern and fantasy aspects.
The Gunstringer: Dead Man Running	2012	Windows 8, Windows RT	Other Ocean Interactive	Temple Run style endless runner with a western theme.
Tin Star	1994	Super NES	Nintendo	Shoot 'em up-style sci-fi Western with anthropomorphic robot characters.
Weird West (video game)	2022	Windows, PlayStation 4, Xbox One	Devolver Digital	Non-traditional Western, action RPG with isometric view. Designed by Arkane Studios founder Raphaël Colantonio (With a different studio).
West of Dead	2020	Windows, Xbox One, PlayStation 4, Nintendo Switch	Raw Fury	A non-traditional & roguelike, twin-stick shooter in isometric view with dark, Mike Mignola's comics-style visuals.
West of Loathing	2017	Linux, macOS, Windows, Windows Apps, Nintendo Switch, Stadia	Asymmetric Publications	Comedy adventure RPG with hand-drawn B&W side-scrolling visuals. Set in a Fantasy Western frontier with magic & monsters.
Wild Arms	1996	PlayStation, PlayStation 2	Agetec, Sony	Fantasy & supernatural Western JRPG with steampunk tech & magic. Draws from western-themed manga like Trigun.
Wild Arms 2	1999	PlayStation	Sony	Sequel adds more sci-fi tech, fantasy & steampunk themes.
Wild Arms 3	2002	PlayStation 2	Sony, Ubisoft	First fully 3D Wild Arms game with cel-shaded visuals.
Wild Arms 4	2005	PlayStation 2	505 Game Street, SCEI, Xseed Games	Turn-of-the-century Western theme. More action-heavy than predecessors.
Wild Arms 5	2006	PlayStation 2	505 Games, SCEI, Xseed Games	Game story has ancient robot giants.
Wild Arms Alter Code: F	2003	PlayStation 2	Sony, Agetec	Fully 3D enhanced remake of the 1st Wild Arms.
Wild Arms Mobile	2006	Adobe Flash	Yahoo! Keitai, I-Mode, and EZWeb	Series of flash-based mobile games.
Wild Arms XF	2007	PlayStation Portable	505 Games, SCEI, Xseed Games	SRPG.
Wild Guns	1994	Super NES, Wii, Wii U	Natsume	Space western shooting gallery game with steampunk influences.
Wild West C.O.W.-Boys of Moo Mesa	1992	Arcade	Konami	Cow-themed & 4-player, side-scrolling shooter based on the namesake animated TV series.

== Cancelled games ==
Also includes delisted games which can't be downloaded anywhere again.

=== Traditional Westerns ===
Title	Release date	Platform(s)	Developer(s)/Publisher(s)	Notes
Magnificent 5	2020	Windows	Free Reign Entertainment	2020 battle Royale FPS spun off from bad MMO, Wild West Online (2018) / New Frontier (2019). Delisted in 2023.
New Frontier	2019	Windows	Free Reign Entertainment	Recycled from delisted 2018 MMO, Wild West Online. Delisted in mid-2021.
Wild West Online	2018	Windows	612 Games	Stunning but badly reviewed MMO. Delisted in 2019.

=== Non-traditional Westerns ===
Title	Release date	Platform(s)	Developer(s)/Publisher(s)	Notes
Priest	Cancelled (2003 or after)	Windows	JC Entertainment	A Korean MMORPG, based on a popular, namesake Korean comic book, that mixed horror and Wild West themes.
Showdown Bandit	Cancelled (After 2019)	Windows	Kindly Beast	An episodic stealth action horror game based on puppets who once starred in a kids tv show.
Trigun: The Planet Gunsmoke	Cancelled (After 2002)	PlayStation 2	Sega	Third-person shooter based on the Trigun manga. Slightly similar to same dev's Gungrave.
