= Oregon Trail (disambiguation) =

The Oregon Trail was a historic migration route across the western United States.

Oregon Trail may also refer to:

== Art, entertainment, and media ==
=== Films ===
- The Oregon Trail (1923 serial)
- The Old Oregon Trail (film), a 1928 American western directed by Victor Adamson (as Denver Dixon)
- The Oregon Trail (1936 film), starring John Wayne
- The Oregon Trail (1939 serial)
- Oregon Trail (1945 film), starring Sunset Carson
- The Oregon Trail (1959 film), starring Fred MacMurray

=== Games ===
- The Oregon Trail (series), a series of educational computer games
  - The Oregon Trail (1971 video game), a text-based strategy video game
  - The Oregon Trail (1985 video game), an educational computer game by MECC based on the 1971 video game
  - The Oregon Trail (2009 video game), the 2009 iOS and DSiware version of the 1985 video game
  - The Oregon Trail (2011 video game), the 2011 version of the 1985 video game
  - The Oregon Trail (card game), by Pressman Toy Corporation, based on the video game of the same name
- Oregon Trail (board game), 1981

=== Television ===
- The Oregon Trail (TV series), 1977
- "The Oregon Trail", an episode from the eleventh season of the ABC News program What Would You Do?
- ’Oregon Trail’, an episode of the third season of the animated series Teen Titans Go!
- Miracle Workers: Oregon Trail, the third season of the 2019 series Miracle Workers

=== Other ===
- The Oregon Trail, a 2015 play by Bekah Brunstetter
- The Oregon Trail: Sketches of Prairie and Rocky-Mountain Life (1849), an influential history by Francis Parkman
- The Trail to Oregon!, a 2014 musical from Starkid

== Other uses ==
- Oregon Trail Council, a unit of the Boy Scouts of America
- Oregon Trail Junior High School, a school in Kansas
- Oregon Trail Generation, a neologism for those born during GenerationX/Millennial cusp years

== See also ==
- Trail, Oregon, a US census-designated place
- Oregon Coast Trail, a long-distance hiking route along the Pacific coast
