= Amazon Trail II =

1996 video game

- Developer: The Adventure Company
- Publisher: MECC
- Series: The Oregon Trail
- Platforms: Windows, Macintosh
- Release: 1996
- Genre: Simulation
- Mode: Single-player

Amazon Trail II is a simulation video game developed by The Adventure Company and published by MECC for the Macintosh and Windows. It was released in September 1996. The game is a spin-off of The Oregon Trail.

It is the second video game in the Amazon Trail video game series, succeeding The Amazon Trail and preceding Amazon Trail 3rd Edition.

It was included in a games bundle with the Quantex 5500, and in the Trail Mix Social Studies Bundle with The Oregon Trail 3rd Edition and MayaQuest: The Mystery Trail. The Quantex QP6/333 M-1c package also included the game in its software package.

== Production ==
The aim of this educational video game is to teach players about the "culture, ecology, and history of the Amazon River". Richard D. Thompson was the game's video director.

The game was donated to The Strong National Museum of Play.

== Plot ==
The game starts with a mysterious incident at the Museum of Ancient Art, which results in the player ending up in the Amazon. Players are then sent to find a local cure to a disease, with the end goal being to reach the city of Vilcabamba.

== Gameplay ==
Featuring "the same gameplay and educational styling" as The Oregon Trail, players take a virtual trip up the South American Amazon River in a canoe in an interactive learning journey. The game has 3 levels of difficulty. Players receive points by remaining healthy, using their resources wisely, and conversing with characters correctly. The best players have their names put into a high score list. A fishing meter shows how hard the harpoon is thrown when fishing. Tour guides ask the player questions which they must respond to further the game. The game includes four river guides, 17 assignments, and 50 characters.

== Critical reception ==
Janice Reutter wrote in the Science and Children journal that the game is "an exciting, adventurous journey" with "attractive graphics", "mysterious and intriguing sound effects", and "beautiful 3D...scenes". The Boston Herald favourably compared it to its "pretty simple" and "not very attractive" predecessor Amazon Trail, deeming it a "good buy for families who don't yet have Amazon Trail". Computer Shopper said a software package that included the game was a "great starting point for the first-time buyer". The Washington Post's review included testimony from their "kid software tester" Sarah Phillips, who said that parts of the game could be "pretty neat" or "extremely frustrating". MECC deemed it "one of the most compelling interactive adventures ever". TESL-EJ described it as "wonderful" and "imaginative".
