= Freedom! (video game) =

1992 video game

- Start screen
- Developer: MECC
- Publisher: MECC
- Platform: Apple II
- Release: 1992
- Genres: Edutainment, simulation

Freedom! is a 1992 educational video game for the Apple II developed and published by the Minnesota Educational Computing Consortium (MECC). Based on similar gameplay from MECC's earlier The Oregon Trail, the player assumes the role of a runaway slave in the antebellum period of American history who is trying to reach the North through the Underground Railroad. The game was developed with help of an African-American consultant who guided MECC on appropriate graphics and dialect that represented the era. It is recognized as one of the first video games dealing with the topic of slavery.

The game was meant to be used in a school curriculum when it was released in late 1992, but most schools simply released the game to students to play without prior lessons. This led to numerous parents complaining to MECC and their schools about the racially offensive nature of the game, and threatening to sue MECC. Though MECC offered to make changes to alleviate these concerns, the company ultimately pulled the game from sale.

== Gameplay ==
Players choose one of two characters (male or female). Attributes such as literacy and ability to swim are randomly generated, providing the player with different experiences during each playthrough. If the player's character is illiterate, written signs and notes appear onscreen as indecipherable symbols. Literacy also affects other areas of play. For example, early in the game, the character may receive a pass from their slavemaster in order to escape to the North. If they do not receive a pass, players are also given the option to forge a pass if the player's character is able to read and write.

Freedom! was the first educational game to use an open-world environment, simulating real-world areas of Virginia, Maryland, and Delaware. During gameplay, players can travel in any direction using the stars, moss, or a compass to orient themselves. During travel, the player encounters random events such as interactions with slavecatchers, who pursue the player with dogs, as well as sympathetic members of the Underground Railroad, who provide the player with food and shelter.

== Development and release ==
MECC had previously developed a graphical version of The Oregon Trail in 1985 as part of its educational software library, and had developed a number of similar games based on the same themes involving similar historical treks, such as The Yukon Trail based on the Klondike Gold Rush. While simulating the escape through the Underground Railroad also fit this theme, the primary influence for Freedom! came from a local Minnesota activist, Kamau Kambui, who had begun organizing live Underground Railroad reenactments in the late 1980s to show young people what the slaves at the time had to suffer to make their escape to freedom. MECC designer Rich Bergeron met with Kambui and designed the basics of Freedom! around Kambui's reenactments, and Kambui became a consultant on the game. Under Kambui's consulting, the game included elements such as the player-character being illiterate and the use of era-specific dialogue.

Like most of MECC's games, Freedom! was released in late 1992 with instructions for use in a classroom setting, with the expectation that the teacher would first guide students on certain lessons before letting them play the game; because of the cultural nature of the title, the manual had included numerous cautions to teachers to avoid perpetuating racial biases, but the game was most often used by students without any curriculum set by the school. In one of the first known events, the game's release at a Merrillville, Indiana elementary school led several African-American parents to demand the school pull the software. Similar situations rippled through other school systems in the United States. MECC and Kambui met with concerned Merrillville parents and members of the NAACP to discuss concerns about the game and if there were ways to fix it. At these meetings, MECC was criticized for having "Nintendoized" slavery, in addition to the offensive imagery and slang they used in the game. While the parents did acknowledge that the Merrillville schools lacked the curriculum to support the game, they were still concerned about the subject matter of Freedom!. Following these early 1993 meetings and threats of lawsuits should they continue to promote the software, MECC made the decision to pull all copies of Freedom!, instructed all schools to destroy the copies of Freedom! that they had, and forwent any changes to address the concerns. Despite this, a suit was filed against MECC in 1995 by parents in the Tempe, Arizona school system which had failed to destroy their copy.

Freedom! had impacts on future MECC games. When producing Africa Trail, which features a 12,000-mile (19,000 km) bike ride through Africa to learn about its various cultures, MECC hired a focus group to ensure the game would be marketed and presented properly so as to avoid the same pitfalls that had occurred with Freedom!.

In 2020, screenshots from the game were jokingly posted on the unmoderated Internet forum AutoAdmit by a user who was later identified as Tucker Carlson's top writer, Blake Neff. Due to this and other offensive posts Neff made on the forum, he was fired shortly thereafter.
