= Amazon Trail 3rd Edition =

1998 video game

- Developer: MECC
- Publisher: The Learning Company
- Series: The Oregon Trail
- Platforms: Windows, Macintosh
- Release: September 14, 1998
- Genre: Edutainment
- Mode: Single-player

Amazon Trail 3rd Edition: Rainforest Adventures is a 1998 game based on the video game The Oregon Trail. It is not a true sequel to the franchise, but is rather largely the same game as Amazon Trail II, only with updated graphics, interfaces, and major bug fixes that caused problems in the second game. The game was published by The Learning Company.

== Gameplay ==
Challenges of Teaching with Technology Across the Curriculum describes the gameplay as follows: "Journey into uncharted rainforests, where intrigue lurks everywhere in the Rainforest. Along the way, students travel back through time, meeting people from previous centuries who may or may not help them complete their adventures".

The game aims to make ecology, geography, and critical thinking fun. The game includes "photo-realistic rain forest scenes".

== Development ==
The game was announced in May 1998.

== Critical reception ==
GiantMike gave the game a rating of 8/10 stars, commenting: "If you have children, or just enjoy edutainment games, Amazon Trail is perfect. Ever since the original Oregon Trail, this series has been immensely popular with school children. Every version since then has just gotten better and better, and this one is no exception". MacHome wrote: "It's supposed to be an exotic journey through the luscious Amazon region. Yet somehow, the Learning Company's third iteration of its Amazon Trail program does more to squelch one's primal desire to explore than it does to encourage it". Challenges of Teaching with Technology Across the Curriculum gave the game an evaluation score of 185 when analysing its suitability for social studies classrooms. PC Magazine wrote "[players'] lives will depend upon implementing what they've learnt about botany, geography, habitats, and social science along the trail...Such is the premise behind Amazon Trail's immersive, enlightening, and altogether entertaining trek through science and nature".
