= The Oregon Trail 5th Edition =

2001 video game

The Oregon Trail 5th Edition: Adventures Along the Oregon Trail
- Cover art
- Developers: Broderbund (Riverdeep, Inc., LLC)
- Publishers: The Learning Company (Riverdeep, Inc., LLC); Selectsoft (Selectsoft Publishing)
- Designers: Pete Shoemaker; Sherri Wright
- Platforms: Mac OS 8.6, Microsoft Windows 98
- Release: April 1, 2001 (Riverdeep, Inc.); 2005? (Selectsoft)
- Genre: Educational
- Mode: Single-player

The Oregon Trail 5th Edition: Adventures Along the Oregon Trail is a 2001 video game, and the sequel to The Oregon Trail 4th Edition.

== Gameplay ==
The game design is based on Oregon Trail II, but adds various new features to the game, such as the fishing and plant gathering features from the 3rd and 4th editions. Updated graphics have been provided for river crossings. There are also added animated segments which follow the fictional journey of the three Montgomery children, Parker, Cassie, and Jimmy, who leave Independence accompanied by an African American trailblazer named Captain Jed Freedman to search for the children's father in Oregon. Various points of the children's story are triggered when the player reaches a certain destination on the trail, which ranges from dangerous experiences (e.g., Jimmy is bitten by a snake) to campfire scenes in which Captain Jed would tell a story that reflects other historically accurate incidents (such as the Donner Party, the California Gold Rush, and the Santa Fe Trail). The conversation pictures are no longer animated. The soundtrack of Oregon Trail II has also been removed, replaced with a single repeating audio loop.
