= The Oregon Trail (series) =

Series of educational computer games

- Genre: Edutainment
- Developer: MECC
- Publishers: Broderbund; The Learning Company; Gameloft
- Creators: Don Rawitsch; Bill Heinemann; Paul Dillenberger
- First release: The Oregon Trail; December 3, 1971
- Latest release: The Oregon Trail; April 2, 2021
- Spin-offs: The Amazon Trail; The Yukon Trail; MayaQuest: The Mystery Trail; Africa Trail

The Oregon Trail is a series of strategy computer games. The first game was initially developed by Carleton College students Don Rawitsch, Bill Heinemann, and Paul Dillenberger in 1971 and produced by the Minnesota Educational Computing Consortium (MECC) in 1974. The original game was designed to teach eighth grade schoolchildren about the realities of 19th-century pioneer life on the Oregon Trail. The player assumes the role of a wagon leader guiding a party of settlers from Independence, Missouri, to Oregon's Willamette Valley via a covered wagon in 1848.

== History ==
=== Precedent version ===
In 1971, Don Rawitsch, a senior at Carleton College in Northfield, Minnesota, taught an eighth grade history class as a student teacher. Rawitsch recruited two friends and fellow student teachers, Paul Dillenberger and Bill Heinemann, to help with his student-teaching project. Bill Heinemann used HP Time-Shared BASIC running on an HP 2100 minicomputer to write the original computer program.

The original core gameplay concepts that have been included in every subsequent version are initial supply purchase, occasional food hunting, occasional supply purchase at forts, inventory management of supplies, variable travel speed depending upon conditions, frequent misfortunes, and game over upon death or successfully reaching Oregon. The game that would be later named The Oregon Trail was debuted to Rawitsch's class on December 3, 1971. Although the minicomputer's teleprinter and paper tape terminals that predate display screens were awkward to children, the game was immediately popular, and he made it available to users of the minicomputer time-sharing network owned by Minneapolis Public Schools. When the next semester ended, Rawitsch printed out a copy of the source code and deleted it from the minicomputer.

=== MECC ===
In 1974, the Minnesota Educational Computing Consortium (MECC), a state-funded organization that developed educational software for the classroom, hired Rawitsch. He retyped the game from a printout of the 1971 BASIC code into the organization's time-sharing network. Then, he modified the frequency and details of the random events that occurred in the game, to more accurately reflect the accounts he had read in the historical diaries of people who had traveled the trail. In 1975, when his updates were finished, he made the game titled OREGON available to all the schools on the timeshare network. The game became one of the network's most popular programs, with thousands of players monthly.

Rawitsch published the source code of The Oregon Trail, written in BASIC 3.1 for the CDC Cyber 70/73-26, in the Creative Computing May–June 1978 issue That year, MECC began encouraging schools to adopt the Apple II microcomputer. John Cook adapted the game for the Apple II, and it appeared on A.P.P.L.E.'s PDS Disk series No. 108. A further version called Oregon Trail 2 was adapted in June 1978 by J.P. O'Malley. The game was further released as part of MECC's Elementary series, on Elementary Volume 6 in 1980. The game was titled simply Oregon, and featured minimal graphics. It proved so popular that it was re-made under the same title, with substantially improved graphics and expanded gameplay, in 1985. The new version was also updated to more accurately reflect the real Oregon Trail, incorporating notable geographic landmarks as well as human non-player characters with whom the player can interact.

By 1995, The Oregon Trail generated about one-third of MECC's $30 million in annual revenue. An updated version, Oregon Trail Deluxe, was released for DOS and Macintosh in 1992, as well as Windows in 1993 (under the title of simply The Oregon Trail version 1.2) followed by Oregon Trail II in 1995, The Oregon Trail 3rd Edition in 1997, and 4th and 5th editions. As of 2011, more than 65 million copies of The Oregon Trail have been sold.

=== Games ===
Games in the series were released with varying titles.

The Oregon Trail games
Title	Year	Developer	Publisher	Platform
The Oregon Trail	1971	Don Rawitsch, Bill Heinemann, and Paul Dillenberger	Not published	HP 2100
OREGON	1975	Modified by Don Rawitsch	MECC (on timeshare system)	CDC Cyber 70, HP2000
OREGON	1978	John Cook (ported from timeshare version)	MECC (as download)	Apple II
OREGON (part of Elementary Volume 6)	1980	Unchanged from 1978 version	MECC (on floppy disk)	Apple II
Oregon (part of Expeditions)	1983	MECC (ported from 1980 Apple II version)	MECC	Atari 8-bit
Oregon (part of Expeditions)	1984	MECC (ported from 1980 Apple II version)	MECC	Commodore 64, Radio Shack TRS-80
The Oregon Trail	1985	R. Philip Bouchard (designer), MECC	MECC	Apple II
The Oregon Trail	1990	MECC (remake of 1985 Apple II version)	MECC	DOS
The Oregon Trail	1991	MECC	MECC	Macintosh (B&W)
The Oregon Trail Deluxe	1992	MECC (ported from 1991 Macintosh version)	MECC	DOS (with mouse support)
The Oregon Trail	1993	MECC (port of The Oregon Trail Deluxe)	MECC	Windows 3.x, Windows
Oregon Trail II	1995	Wayne Studer (designer), MECC	SoftKey	DOS, Windows 3.x, Windows, Macintosh
The Oregon Trail 3rd Edition	1997	The Learning Company	The Learning Company	Windows, Macintosh
The Oregon Trail 4th Edition	1999	The Learning Company	The Learning Company	Windows, Macintosh
The Oregon Trail 5th Edition	2001	The Learning Company	The Learning Company	Windows, Macintosh
The Oregon Trail	2009	Gameloft Shanghai, Gameloft New York	Gameloft	DSiware
The Oregon Trail: Gold Rush	2010	Gameloft	Gameloft	J2ME
The Oregon Trail HD	2010	Gameloft	Gameloft	Windows Phone, Android, iOS
The Oregon Trail: American Settler	2011	Gameloft	Gameloft	iOS, J2ME
The Oregon Trail	2011	DoubleTapGames LLC	Crave Entertainment	Wii, 3DS
The Oregon Trail Card Game	2016	Pressman Toy Corporation	Pressman Toy Corporation	Card game
The Oregon Trail	2018	Basic Fun! (ported from 1990 DOS version)	Basic Fun!	Handheld device
The Oregon Trail: Journey to Willamette Valley	2018	Pressman Toy Corporation	Pressman Toy Corporation	Board game
The Oregon Trail: StepTracker	2022	Gameloft	Gameloft	Apple Watch
The Oregon Trail	2021	Gameloft	Gameloft	Apple Arcade
The Oregon Trail	2022	Gameloft	Gameloft	Nintendo Switch, Windows
The Oregon Trail	2023	Gameloft	Gameloft	Xbox One, Xbox Series X/S
The Oregon Trail	2024	Gameloft	Gameloft	PlayStation 4, PlayStation 5

== Legacy ==
The game was popular among North American elementary school students from the mid-1980s to the mid-2000s, as many computers came bundled with the game. MECC followed up on the success of The Oregon Trail with similar titles such as The Yukon Trail and The Amazon Trail. David H. Ahl published Westward Ho!, set on the Oregon Trail in 1848, as a type-in game in 1986.

The phrase "You have died of dysentery" has been popularized on T-shirts. The game resurfaced in 2008 when Gameloft created an updated version for cell phones. A new release for the iPhone and iPod Touch was also available from Gameloft. The game went live in the iTunes App Store in March 2009.

In 2010, the Palm webOS version was released to the Palm App Catalog on January 7, and Xbox Live version was released on Windows Phone 7 on November 11. The cell phone version of the game is similar to the original, but varies in that the player can choose one of three different wagons: a basic wagon, a prairie schooner or a Conestoga wagon. The player can also choose to become a banker, a carpenter, or a farmer, each of which has unique benefits. Unlike the computer version of the game, players in the iPhone and iPod Touch version do not need to buy guns and bullets. The game has received a major update, in which the player uses trading and crafting to upgrade their wagon, buy food, and cure ailments.

In 2011, the 1975 and 1978 BASIC source code versions of the game were reconstructed. In February 2011, a new version of the game was released on the social networking site Facebook. This version was removed from Facebook when Blue Fang Games closed. A new version of the game was also released for the Wii and 3DS that year, and received a negative critical response.

In 2012, a parody called Organ Trail was released by the Men Who Wear Many Hats for browsers, iOS, and Android, with the setting changed to human survivors fleeing a zombie apocalypse. Also in 2012, the Willamette Heritage Center (WHC) and the Statesman Journal newspaper in Salem, Oregon created Oregon Trail Live as a live-action event.

In 2014, a parody musical called The Trail to Oregon! was made by the musical theater company StarKid Productions, with several references being made towards the game. In 2015, a 5k fun run held in Oregon City (the end of the route of the Oregon Trail) was modeled after the game with choice points along the route. Also that year, Pressman Toy Corporation released The Oregon Trail card game based on the video game. In 2018, a handheld electronic version of the game was produced by the company Basic Fun. This battery-powered version featured a small TV monitor that replicated the look and sounds of one of the older PC/Apple versions of the game. In 2024, an app called OG Trail brought the ability to play the original The Oregon Trail to Android again.

In parallel, Gameloft Brisbane developed a full remake of The Oregon Trail, simply titled The Oregon Trail. It was released in 2021 on Apple Arcade and became the platform’s most downloaded game of the year. This success led Gameloft to release the game on PC and consoles in 2022, where it also achieved commercial success. As a result, Gameloft released a physical edition of the game in 2024.

== Adaptations ==
=== Film adaptation ===
In October 2022, filmmakers Will Speck and Josh Gordon announced a musical comedy film adaptation based on the game, with Pasek and Paul writing original songs for the film. In October 2024, Apple Studios acquired the rights to the film, with a script co-written by the Lucas brothers, and Max Reisman. The film will be produced by Benj Pasek and Justin Paul, and directed by Will Speck and Josh Gordon.

== Reception ==
=== Native Americans ===
Because the theme of the game is the colonization of the American West, some Native American critics have viewed the game as culturally insensitive or racist. The 2021 version of the game for Apple Arcade attempts to "better depict Native American perspectives" and to acknowledge that for Native Americans, colonization "was not an adventure but an invasion". Newer versions of the game offer new Native American characters and storylines. Oregon Trail creative director Jarrad Trudgen consulted with several Native American scholars in an attempt to remove stereotypes and historical inaccuracies.

== See also ==
- The Amazon Trail
- The Yukon Trail
- MayaQuest: The Mystery Trail
- Africa Trail
