= Museum Madness =

1994 video game

- Developer: Novotrade
- Publisher: MECC
- Platforms: MS-DOS, Macintosh
- Release: 1994
- Genre: Educational
- Mode: Single-player

Museum Madness is an educational video game for MS-DOS and Macintosh developed by Novotrade for MECC, and was released in 1994. The game is based in an American natural history museum and aims to teach the player many aspects of history such as technology, geology, space, American history, and prehistory. PC Magazine described the game as having kids learn about educational topics (i.e. ecology) while making logical deductions in a series sequence and solving puzzles.

== Plot ==
The player (at right, with red cap) and MICK listening to an animatronic historical character in the Salem Witch Trials exhibit (DOS version).

The game starts in the bedroom of EJ, an American high-school teenage boy who is seated at his computer, attempting to access the National Museum Interactive Service System, only to see that it is offline for repair. An interactive robot from the museum named MICK (Museum Information Computer Kiosk) appears onscreen and talks to EJ, explaining that the museum is in danger of losing its secrets forever.

EJ appears to have an extraordinary relationship with MICK as he alone understands that MICK can talk back to him, which he uses to learn more about the contents of the museum. MICK recognizes this understanding and thus asks him for help to save the museum. MICK explains that the exhibits have come to life and are acting very strangely. He announces his suspicion that a virus has infected the system while the museum was being converted to complete autonomous computer control.

The player takes the role of EJ and enters the museum. Through the game, he visits each of the exhibits, solving mysteries and puzzles by talking to the historical characters, rearranging objects, trading objects with characters and generally putting things back the way they were.

The game is educationally-based, and the player learns both from the many museum-like information cards placed throughout the exhibits, as well as from solving the problems in the exhibits themselves. Along the way, EJ is aided by MICK, who follows him through the exhibits, instructs him and gives additional help and advice on request.

Once the 25 exhibits are restored, the virus itself must be destroyed, which is the final puzzle to be solved.

== Gameplay ==
The player begins by entering the museum through the basement, working out the basement door's passcode. The player navigates the way into the Main Hall of the museum by a series of numbered doors with corresponding keys which are to be located in the maze of the basement (this introductory location can be skipped if desired).

Once in the Main Hall, the player must locate some batteries to power MICK, which can be found in one of the museum tour tape players. Additionally, the map of the museum on the wall in the Main Hall is found to be in pieces and needs to be reconstructed in order to continue.

Then the player must choose an exhibit to try to repair, using the museum's map to select one. After attempting to repair an exhibit, the player is returned to the Main Hall to select another exhibit. All of the exhibits must be returned to normal before the player can progress to the next portion of the game.

When each of the exhibits have been restored, the player returns to the Main Hall to find MICK missing and a cassette tape in his place on the floor. Using one of the museum tape players from which the batteries used to power MICK were borrowed, the player can listen to the tape (shown as on-screen text), which consists of a message from MICK warning the player to go home; the player decides to follow MICK into the basement and finds him in pieces on a bench in the workshop. Upon reassembling MICK, the player must then access the computer to try to stop the virus by answering general knowledge questions. If the player is successful, the virus self-destructs and the museum is saved, and the game is complete.
