= Jenny's Journeys =

1984 educational video game

- Developer: MECC
- Publisher: MECC
- Platform: Apple II
- Release: 1984
- Genre: Educational

Jenny's Journeys is an educational video game published in 1984 by MECC for the Apple II. From a first-person view, players use a compass and a map to navigate a car containing the protagonist, Jenny, through a pixelated town. The player, acting as Jenny, provides directions at each intersection while the car's owner, 'Aunt Jenny', rides along. The objective of the game is to successfully travel from point to point while using the map. There are three levels of difficulty.

== Production ==
The Minnesota Educational Computing Consortium (MECC) entered the software market in the mid-1980s with a variety of titles, including Jenny's Journeys in 1984. MECC developed Jenny's Journeys to provide a real-world and practical platform. This platform is for children aged 10 and above, and it teaches them how to use and apply map reading skills. MECC ended operations in 1999.

== Plot ==
Jenny's Journeys takes place in the fictional town of Lake City. Players control Jenny, the protagonist of the game, while being accompanied by 'Aunt Jenny'. Players can access Aunt Jenny's car to drive around Lake City, transport non-player characters (NPCs), and input street intersections to receive directions while referencing the map. Players are challenged to identify their location on a map based on their surroundings, identify a destination from an address, and plot a route across town while managing their gas. On the hardest difficulty, there are multiple stops and occasional detours.

== Educational purpose and critical reception ==
Jenny's Journeys was used in schools to teach children about maps. Curriculum Review wrote that the game has a "sound educational purpose and an efficient method of operation". Creative Computing noted that the game reinforced map reading and cognitive skills. Educational resources for Microcomputers stated that the game makes good use of the computer's ability to create simulations. In contrast, the education writer, Gene Edward Rooze, in the January 1989 edition of Computers, Thinking, and Social Studies, asserted that the game was inappropriate for social studies classes.
