= Spellevator =

1988 educational video game

- Developer: MECC
- Platform: Apple II
- Release: 1988
- Genre: Educational
- Modes: Single-player, multiplayer

Spellevator is an educational video game for the Apple II published by MECC in 1988.

== Gameplay ==
Screenshot

The player controls a dust bunny, which is chased by several vacuum cleaners with different movement patterns. The objective of the level is to grab all the letters and exit through the upper left corner. The player can pass through an unoccupied elevator (some vacuum cleaners use elevators also) by correctly answering a spelling or vocabulary question. Once one completes a level, the player can receive a bonus by correctly unscrambling the letters one grabbed into a word.

Spellevator has a utility on the disk's flipside that let a user create a word list and save it to any ProDOS formatted floppy disk. This way, teachers could customize the game to fit their own particular vocabulary lists.

== Legacy ==
Spellevator was followed by Spellevator Plus for additional platforms.
