= Organ Trail =

2010 video game

- Developer: The Men Who Wear Many Hats
- Publishers: The Men Who Wear Many Hats; Boco (PC)
- Engine: Unity
- Platforms: iOS, Android, Linux, Microsoft Windows, Mac OS X, Ouya, PlayStation 4, PlayStation Vita, Nintendo Switch
- Release: Web; 2010 iOS, Android; August 9, 2012; Windows, Linux, OS X December 28, 2012; Ouya; June 18, 2013; PS4, PS Vita: NA: October 20, 2015; PAL: August 17, 2016; Nintendo Switch; August 10, 2023
- Genres: Simulation, survival
- Mode: Single-player

Organ Trail is a "zombie survival game" that parodies the educational game series The Oregon Trail. It was initially released as a free Adobe Flash–based browser game, and later as a Facebook app. This version was developed by Ben Perez, Michael Block, and Ryan Wiemeyer. The game uses the Unity game engine.

An expanded version, The Organ Trail: Director's Cut, was released on mobile devices in August 2012. That same month the Director's Cut was also posted on Steam Greenlight; after receiving enough support, it was released on Steam for Windows, Mac, and Linux on March 19, 2013. The expanded version was developed by Michael Block and Ryan Wiemeyer, founders of the company The Men Who Wear Many Hats.

Director's Cut has sold 429,192 copies as of August 9, 2013. Most of the copies were sold on Humble Bundle, Steam and iOS. Most profits were made on the Steam and iOS platforms.

== Gameplay ==
In The Organ Trail, players must cross a post-apocalyptic United States in a car in order to reach a sanctuary free of zombies, called Safe Haven. Players must manage their limited resources, including food, ammunition, medicine, scrap, money, and fuel for their vehicle, in order to complete their journey and keep everyone in their party alive and healthy.

At the beginning players can choose from a number of characters to play as, including a cop from Kentucky, a clerk from New Jersey, or a lawyer from Miami.

== Director's cut ==
The Organ Trail's popularity led its developers to start a Kickstarter to fund a "director's cut" of the game based on fan feedback and suggestions. The Director's Cut features a number of changes to the original game, including a customizable protagonist instead of the above preset characters, "choose-your-own-adventure" style random encounters, boss fights, in-game achievements and online leaderboards. While the original game has been described as a "1:1 pure parody" of The Oregon Trail, the developers decided The Director's Cut should stand on its own as a title that pushed beyond the source material.

In contrast to the original game which is free to play, The Director's Cut is a commercial product. It was released for iOS and Android devices on August 9, 2012. It debuted for Linux, Mac, PC and Android via The Humble Bundle.

== Reception ==
Reception

Aggregate score
Aggregator	Score
Metacritic	(iOS, Vita) 86/100 (PS4) 80/100 (PC) 74/100

Review scores
Publication	Score
Destructoid	(PC) 8/10
Gamezebo	(iOS) 4/5
Hyper	(iOS) 9/10
PC Gamer (UK)	71%
PC PowerPlay	7/10
Pocket Gamer	(iOS) 4.5/5
TouchArcade	(iOS) 4.5/5
Digital Spy	(iOS) 5/5

The game received "generally favorable reviews" on all platforms except the PC version, which received "average" reviews, according to the review aggregation website Metacritic.
