= The Oregon Trail: American Settler =

2011 video game

- Developer: Gameloft
- Publisher: Gameloft
- Series: The Oregon Trail
- Platforms: iOS; fireOS
- Release: November 17, 2011
- Genre: City-building
- Mode: Single-player

The Oregon Trail: American Settler is a city-building game developed and published by Gameloft. Released on November 17, 2011, for iOS and fireOS, it is the sequel to Gameloft's 2009 reboot of The Oregon Trail.

== Gameplay ==
Taking place narratively after a player completes a standard game of The Oregon Trail, players of American Settler have to build a new town in the frontier. Like many other freemium titles, players have to acquire money and use it to purchase buildings and other goods to keep production flourishing. The gameplay is similar to other games from the same genre, such as FarmVille and FrontierVille, sharing the same top-down perspective of the landscape.

== Release ==
American Settler was released on November 17, 2011.

Reception

Aggregate score
Aggregator	Score
Metacritic	66/100

Review scores
Publication	Score
Gamezebo	4/5
TouchArcade	3/5
Multiplayer.it	65/100

The game has a Metacritic rating of 66/100 based on 4 critic reviews. Multiplayer.it claimed the game was fun at first, but soon went downhill. They gave the game a 65/100.

== Remake ==
The Oregon Trail: American Settler was remade into The Oregon Trail: Boom Town, published by Tilting Point, LLC, on October 25, 2022. It was released on both the App Store and Google Play.
