= Zoyon Patrol =

1987 video game

- Developer: MECC
- Publisher: MECC
- Platform: Apple II
- Release: NA: 1987
- Genre: Educational
- Mode: Single-player

Zoyon Patrol is an educational simulation game for the Apple II published by MECC in 1987. The player is the director of the Zoyon patrol, located on the fictional Zaphyr Island (supposedly located at 7°52' S, and 178º28' E, which is approximately 7 miles NE of Nukufetau, Tuvalu, in the south Pacific).

Zoyons are fictional creatures, whose names and features are combination of pre-existing creatures. For instance one Zoyon is called Catamonk, and it shares feature of a Cat and Monkey. An Elecoon has features of an Elephant and a Racoon.

== Gameplay ==
As the director of the Zoyon Patrol, the player is charged with taking messages about Zoyons, identifying the Zoyon in question, trapping it alive, and arranging for its safe return to its native habitat. Every Zoyon is to be considered an endangered species.
