= The Amazon Trail =

1993 video game

- Cover art for version 1.0 release from MECC.
- Developer: MECC
- Publisher: MECC
- Series: The Oregon Trail
- Platforms: MS-DOS, Macintosh, Windows 3.x, Windows
- Release: 1993 (DOS); 1994 (Win 3.x); 1996 (Win/Mac)
- Genre: Educational
- Mode: Single-player

The Amazon Trail is an educational computer game created by MECC. It was inspired by the popularity of The Oregon Trail, featuring the areas surrounding the Amazon River and some of its tributaries. In this 2D adventure, the player is asked to set out on a journey up the Amazon, hoping to make it to the lost Inca village of Vilcabamba. Along the way, the player learns about the people who live on and use the river for their survival. The Amazon Trail is known for being significantly more difficult than its predecessors in the franchise, such as The Oregon Trail. It was released in 1993 for MS-DOS, 1994 for Windows 3.x and 1996 for Windows and Macintosh. Amazon Trail II was released as a sequel to this game and Amazon Trail 3rd Edition was a re-release of that sequel with performance enhancements and new additions.

== Plot ==
During the opening sequence, a short animation displays a person asleep in bed, coincidentally, in Peru, Indiana. They are visited during a dream by a jaguar who calls himself the jaguar of the Inca King. The jaguar explains that the Inca people are endangered by malaria and European explorers, and the player will be taken back in time in order to search for cinchona and deliver it to the king. The jaguar from the dream appears throughout the game as a hazy vision, running off a checklist of items desired by the Inca King, and offering various gloomy sentiments about the rainforest in general.

== Gameplay ==
A photographic depiction of Belém in the game.

At the start of the game, the player has been transported to Belém, Brazil, and is given the option of choosing one of two native guides (Isabel or Antonio), who offer advice over the course of the game pertinent to navigating the river and maintaining ample supplies and good health. Each guide comes equipped with a slightly different spread of supplies (Antonio has more tents, while Isabel has more food). Players may come across various people along the river, taking photographs of the flora and fauna of the area, fishing, and canoeing.

Players must navigate the treacherous waters of the Amazon to avoid hitting other boats, logs, and whirlpools or paddling up the wrong tributary, travel through the forest in search of exotic plants and animals to photograph and identify, use harpoons to fish in the river and then identify whether the catch is edible, and trade with the individuals encountered at the various stops along the river. In order to aid in identification, each time a picture is taken or fish caught, the player has the option of checking the guide, which lists all of the species in the game except for the "new species".

There are multiple dangers. Capsizing could lead to loss of supplies and injury, or even cause the player to drown, resulting in an instant game over. When fishing, one has to be wary of spearing an electric eel or stingray, as this may lead to a loss of health (though the latter is regarded as edible). The player can contract a variety of diseases (including malaria and yellow fever), requiring multiple days of rest to recover. Paddling up the wrong tributary for too long will result in being captured by headhunters or western explorers.

A unique aspect of the game is the element of traveling back in time, which allows the user to learn historical information in addition to science. Before arriving at a new town or tributary, players pass through a "blue mist" over the river (a line of fog across the screen). Upon arriving at a landmark, the option is given of talking to two people, typically one native and one Westerner. Often, the duo offer conflicting information and advice. The timeframe spans from the then-present (1993) back to the Middle Ages. Historical figures appear, such as Henry Ford, Theodore Roosevelt, and Claude Lévi-Strauss. The player is given a good feel for the differing attitudes and clashing roles portrayed by the encountered individuals, pertaining to the history of the Amazon. Many of these figures have interesting items which can be acquired in trade for food, clothing, etc.

Upon reaching the hidden city in which the Inca are living, players are graded on various aspects of the game, including the amount of personal activity on the journey, the number of plants and animals correctly identified in the rainforest, whether or not they acquired additional gifts for the Inca King, and, depending on the version of the game, the amount of time taken, the health of the player, and the completion of mini-quests. Based on these factors, the player is awarded a shield covered in designs. Each task completed translates to an additional gem on the shield.

== Educational goals ==
Amazon Trail incorporates realism including photographs and audio recordings taken at the corresponding locations. Facts on 30 different famous people of the Amazon basin are covered as well as South American history, culture and ecosystems. The game helps players develop comprehension, survival and navigation skills, without any complicated tasks required and quest clues to follow.

== Reception ==
Computer Gaming World in 1993 warned of The Amazon Trail's "severe" hardware requirements, but approved of the "entertaining adventure's ... splendid animation and authentic native music", and its teaching of planning, research skills, and history.

The game sold more than one million units.
