= Mage's Initiation: Reign of the Elements =

2019 video game

- Steam cover art
- Developer: Himalaya Studios
- Publisher: Himalaya Studios
- Designers: Daniel Stacey; Chris Warren
- Engine: Adventure Game Studio
- Platforms: Windows, Linux, macOS
- Release: January 30, 2019
- Genre: Adventure
- Mode: Single-player

Mage's Initiation: Reign of the Elements is a 2019 adventure game created by Himalaya Studios for Windows, Linux, and macOS.

== Development ==
On September 21, 2009, the developers announced in a newsletter email that they had "commenced preliminary development" on a new game. They also revealed that it wouldn't be a sequel to Al Emmo, but rather an original project blending adventure and role-playing video game elements:

The game's plot details are currently under wraps, as we still need to sort through some final details. But we can confirm that, based on fan feedback, our forthcoming title will center around a fantasy, pseudo-medieval theme, similar to what Sierra fans have come to expect from the classic King's Quest and Quest for Glory games. Players will also have access to a specific class-based set of actions, with a total of 4 character classes to choose from.

A crowdfunding campaign was run for the project on Kickstarter in early 2013 with a target of US$65,000.

== Reception ==
Mage's Initiation: Reign of the Elements received an aggregated score of 70 on Metacritic, indicating mixed or average reviews. Game Critics praised the game's story and worldbuilding, but felt that the combat and mazes were repetitive. Adventure Gamers celebrated the game's art, as well as its writing, dialog and voice acting, but criticized its combat and role-playing game mechanics. GameSpot was similarly positive about the game's art and story, while criticizing its combat and cinematics. PC Invasion described playing the game as "like discovering a lost Sierra title from the VGA generation," but "[a]t its worst, it's a bit of an uninteresting slog."
