= The Oregon Trail 3rd Edition =

1997 video game

- Developer: MECC
- Publisher: The Learning Company (TLC Properties Inc.)
- Series: The Oregon Trail
- Platforms: Microsoft Windows 95 (CD, DVD), Mac OS 7.5 (CD)
- Release: November 1997
- Genre: Edutainment
- Mode: Single-player

The Oregon Trail 3rd Edition (full title: The Oregon Trail 3rd Edition: Pioneer Adventures) is the second sequel to the 1985 edutainment video game The Oregon Trail after Oregon Trail II. It was developed by MECC and released in 1997.

== Gameplay ==
Like all other games in the Trail series, The Oregon Trail 3rd Edition requires careful resource management in order to successfully complete the perilous journey across America via the Oregon trail to the Western frontier.

The game included a guide book with helpful hints in case the player got stuck.

== Reception ==
Reception

Awards
Publication	Award
PC Magazine	Top 100 CD-Rom Award
National Educational Media Network	Silver Apple

Game Industry News wrote: "I do find this game to be an excellent learning experience for players. It is marketed for people ages ten to adult, and even if you are an adult this game offers enough of a challenge coupled with entertainment to keep your interest". The Hour wrote: "This is an excellent role playing game for children ages 10 up to adults". Elizabeth Weal of the MacHome Journal said that "this upgrade of the simulation - with new full-motion video, improved graphics, and new players' decisions - makes the product even more engaging than its predecessors".

The 2002 book Designing Instruction for Technology-enhanced Learning suggested that edutainment properties that have been around for a long time, such as Where in the World is Carmen Sandiego? and The Oregon Trail "have been through many..evaluations, and the subsequent versions reflect careful attention to who is using the product and how well it sells". It cited the then-recent The Oregon Trail 3rd Edition (1997) and Where in the World Is Carmen Sandiego? (1996) as examples of this. During the inaugural Interactive Achievement Awards, The Oregon Trail received a nomination for "PC Family/Kids Title of the Year" by the Academy of Interactive Arts & Sciences.
