= Africa Trail =

1995 video game

- Cover art
- Developer: MECC
- Publisher: The Learning Company
- Designer: Cherie Neima
- Platforms: MacOS, Windows, Windows 3.x
- Release: 1995
- Genres: Adventure, educational, simulation, sports
- Mode: Single-player

Africa Trail is an educational computer game developed by MECC and published by The Learning Company. The gameplay resembles that of MECC's other "Trail" games, in which players must prepare for a long journey, choose their traveling companions, and make it safely to their destination. In Africa Trail, players must travel across Africa via bicycle. The game includes a Multimedia Resource Tool to allow players to make their own journal and presentation of the journey.

== Start ==
The object of the game is to make it to Cape Agulhas, South Africa in a limited number of days. First the player must pick a route, going for the longer route from Bizerte, Tunisia or two shorter routes from Lagos, Nigeria or Nairobi, Kenya. Next the player must pick three out of six possible teammates for the team. Teammates differ by profession, skills, biking experience, travel experience, and trek preferences. Certain teammates will make the journey easier and more likely to reach the final destination in good time. The player's team will start with a bike each, basic supplies and money to buy food, additional supplies and lodging. Then the player needs to buy spare parts for the bikes. The player can carry up to 300 pounds worth of items.

== The Trail ==
Before the player can enter a new country, visas stamps are required on the passports, which can be obtained in large or capital cities, otherwise the player will be forced to backtrack. Visas cost money and take a number of days to be registered. Communication with the locals varies depending on the language qualifications of player's teammates. The bike team will need to eat and rest from time to time.

Food can be purchased in the form of groceries (which are cheaper and last longer, but do not nourish much) or meals (which adequately nourish, but spoil after a short time and are more expensive) to feed the bike team. Additional bike parts can also be purchased to make bike repairs. Accommodations are provided in lodgings to allow the bike team to rest. Prices will vary depending on locality and on the currency the player uses. Purchases can be directly bought, bargained for, or purchased using a credit card. Everything bought adds to the weight packed. The player cannot exceed the maximum weight the bike team can carry.

The bike team's travel depends on their health and morale levels (the player does not have a morale level). Health decreases should a teammate sustain injuries, catch some health problem along the journey, or go hungry. If health runs out, the player or teammate must be sent home. Morale decreases when a teammate finds the player's decisions unreliable and loses hope of completing the journey. If morale runs out, the teammate will leave the team.

== Design ==
=== Development ===
The game makes use of over 1,000 photos and two dozen video clips obtained from a 12,000 mile trek across Africa by world-famous cyclists, including Dan Buettner, who made his "Africatrek" in 1992.

MECC offered Washington Apple Pi members a special 5-pack CD-ROM collection of their adventure games, including this title.

=== Educational goals ===
The game shows players the different cultures and travel routes in Africa. The topics covered in the game include Geography, History, People and Cultural Diversity. In addition the game teaches the importance of careful decision making and managing available resources as well the hardships of developing countries.

== Reception ==
=== Critical reception ===
Reception

Review scores
Publication	Score
AllGame	4/5
MacUser	4.5/5

World Village wrote that the game was "best suited as a tool to supplement African social studies", as many school children within the target age group would not have sufficiently learned about Africa at that point in their lives. AllGameGuide said the game "simulates the feel of a bike trip well", but added "it is less adept at showing players the people of Africa. You may get a feel for the people and culture, but the information is really no more than a superficial glimpse". Children's software reviewer Warren Buckleitner praised the game for its detail but felt it did not meet the quality of Oregon Trail II. H-Net felt it was far superior to The Oregon Trail. The Orlando Sentinel felt the game allowed players to test their critical thinking skills. The Boston Globe noted the game lets players explore the life of Africa. MacUser praised the game's graphics and music.

=== Promotion ===
The game was previewed at the Electronic Entertainment Expo 1995.
