= Oregon Trail (board game) =

Board game

Oregon Trail is a 1981 board game published by Fantasy Games Unlimited, based on the 1971 text-based strategy video game of the same name.

== Gameplay ==
Oregon Trail is a role-playing game in which pioneers move to the American West in covered wagons along the Oregon Trail. The player(s), known as the "Trail Boss", can choose attributes to be assigned at the start of the game such as hunting, Indian lore, etc. Gameplay is done through dice rolling and navigating through each board hex with random events taking place until the player either reaches Oregon, or until their party succumbs to any number of fates along the way. In a game with multiple players, a winner is determined by whoever retained the highest percentage of their initial stock items given to them at the start. The game is suited for 1-8 players.

== Reception ==
Writing for Moves #60, editor Richard Berg wrote a mixed review, stating "The number of things that can happen is somewhat limited and, about 15 hexes or so into the trek, things tend to get a bit stale. Of course you can always spice up the trip by taking a few chances - which is what I did somewhere in mid-Colorado. It proved to be a lot of fun; the fact that I managed to starve and kill half of my party didn't bother me that much".

David Ladyman reviewed Oregon Trail in The Space Gamer No. 47. Ladyman commented that "Oregon Trail can't really be cited for historical accuracy because you don't know what parts are accurate and what have been dramatized. In sum, a nice try, but I can't think of a good reason to buy the game."

=== Reviews ===
- 1981 Games 100 in Games
- 1982 Games 100 in Games
