= MayaQuest: The Mystery Trail =

1995 video game

- Macintosh cover art
- Developer: MECC
- Publisher: MECC
- Producer: Greg Holey
- Series: The Oregon Trail
- Platforms: Macintosh, Windows 3.x
- Release: 1995
- Genre: Educational
- Mode: Single-player

MayaQuest: The Mystery Trail (also known as "MayaQuest Trail") is an educational computer game created by MECC and inspired by the actual MayaQuest Expedition. It is a spin-off title of The Oregon Trail series, featuring cities of the Classical Mayan civilization. While travelling across the lands by bicycle, the player learns all about the ancient culture and history of the indigenous people. The game also contains some Spanish language for additional learning.

== Plot ==
For many years the Earth has been protected from incoming meteors by a space network. An incoming meteor in a satellite's path causes a shuttlecraft to be accidentally shot down to the Mexican jungles on Earth with only part of the new laser firing codes transmitted to the Meteor Defense Network. The player is sent to cycle through the jungles to find and recover the code pieces with a limited time before a meteor shower impact.

== Gameplay ==
The game has two modes: Adventure mode and Explore mode. In the Adventure mode, the player has a limited number of days to find four code pieces for the Meteor Defense Network before a meteor shower impact can occur. The player will receive objectives from the Mexican station commander and has to complete them as quickly as possible. In the Explore mode, the player travels around the Mayan ruins to answer the questions of interested contacts before the rainy season begins.

When traveling around Mexico, the player will cycle on a road to the chosen destination. The player must maneuver the bike in a 3D scrolling road environment without going off the edge while avoiding pot holes, logs and other obstacles along the way. Otherwise the player suffers an injury or breaks the bike. If the bike is damaged, the player has the option to get it fixed for a price in one or two places, or else the player must walk, which takes more time. If the player is injured, there are options to rest (which takes up time) or continue in one or more ways.

In a destination, the player can move around by clicking the mouse pointer where it changes to an arrow icon. If the player finds something interesting, the pointer will change into a magnifying glass. The player can also use an overworld map of the destination to travel around quicker. In some places, the player will navigate a maze-like area with a compass and a map. The player also has the option to immediately escape from the maze.

== Development ==
The game makes use of over 1,500 photos and videos that were taken during Dan Buettner's expedition. His team consisted of his brother Steve, two anthropologists and a photographer. By February 1995, users could log into the Internet or Prodigy to vote where the team should go. The expedition followed a route based on the popular chosen routes and places and worked with scientists at the historic sites. Online users also got access of the team's progress thanks to the high-tech equipment they brought with them. They updated their website with their daily findings. The expedition was carried out in three months. The product was eventually released by Fall that very same year. MECC used the team's video and photographs to produce the visual assets in the educational adventure game.

== Reception ==
Reception

Review score
Publication	Score
GameSpot	6.5/10

According to surveys carried by Classroom Connect Inc. to over 165 educators around the US, MayaQuest was highly praised for its rich features, high curriculum value and the Spanish content for bilingual teaching. Electronic Entertainment compared it to Exploring the Lost Maya, noting that they do not focus on the collapse of the Mayan civilization, instead exploring the intriguing life and culture of the civilizations through the ruins they left behind. The Computer Museum deemed it an "authentic...intriguing simulation". Macs for Teachers deemed it "probably the hottest new software title in the world". The game has been recommended for children with special needs. School Library Journal identified a weakness of having to have an intimate knowledge of the user manual before being able to competently understand the game mechanics.

Other quests were also carried out, including AustraliaQuest, IslandQuest, AfricaQuest, AsiaQuest, AmericaQuest, GalapagosQuest, and, GreeceQuest.

The paper Making Connections: Building Family Literacy through Technology conducted research that found parents who experience MayaQuest recommended that their kids instead play a game based on the Aztec civilization due to the perception that they contributed more to contemporary culture.

Sourcewell Technology (Formerly known as TIES) incorporated the MayaQuest material into Minnesota school websites.
