= The Oregon Trail (2009 video game) =

2009 video game

- Developers: Gameloft Shanghai; Gameloft New York
- Publisher: Gameloft
- Platforms: Java ME; Android iOS; Windows Mobile; BlackBerry; Nintendo DSi
- Release: iOS; March 11, 2009; DSi; December 28, 2009; Android; August 27, 2010; Windows Mobile; October 11, 2010; BlackBerry; January 17, 2013
- Genre: Strategy
- Mode: Single-player

The Oregon Trail is a strategy video game developed by Gameloft New York and Gameloft Shanghai and published by Gameloft. Originally developed in 1985 by the Minnesota Educational Computing Consortium (MECC), the 2009 version is a re-release for Java ME-based mobile phones in 2009; a high-definition version was later released for iOS the same year. The game was then ported to DSiware, followed by followed by Android and Windows Mobile in 2010, and finally came to BlackBerry in 2013. The game was followed by two sequels: The Oregon Trail: Gold Rush and The Oregon Trail: American Settler.

== Plot ==
In the game, the player acts as a wagon leader as they guide a party of settlers on the Oregon Trail traveling West from Independence, Missouri, to Oregon in 1848 or 1849, depending on which route the player selects. Before departure, the player is first tasked with selecting a profession and name for their own character before naming their traveling counterparts.

The player then has the opportunity to outfit their wagon with certain resources as they see fit—players can select items ranging from food, clothing, ammunition, and even spare parts for the wagon in anticipation for the journey ahead. While on the trail, the player must make executive decisions concerning the party's wellbeing such as resource management and random events like bandits, natural disasters, and disease. Often, these occurrences will be paired with a minigame to determine whether or not the player's character and their party succeed—from hunting, crossing rivers, wagon repairing and berry picking, these side quests seek to reflect the real dangers that settlers faced while on the Oregon Trail.

The game eventually ends when either all four members of the player's party die, or the player reaches Oregon with at least one member of their party before that can happen.

== Changes from the original version ==
Gameplay of the 2009 version of The Oregon Trail features the player's wagon breaking down.

The game expands on the 1985 game of the same name and has a notable shift in the cartoon graphics, presenting much more bright and cheery in contrast with its dated counterpart The 2009 version also features 8 different minigames that stretch far beyond the simple hunting minigame featured in the original game. These new games include skill tests like rafting, panning for gold, and fishing to incite more excitement in players.

The newer version is also updated to connect with X and Facebook, a feature that did not exist when the original versions premiered in 1971 and 1985 to encourage fans to virtually connect over the game

== Reception ==
Reception

Aggregate score
Aggregator	Score
GameRankings	iOS: 82%

Overall the game received fairly positive reception from players and critics alike, Nintendo Life noting: "As it turns out, The Oregon Trail is fun enough to stand on its own outside of class even after all these years. And with improved load times and added camera functionality, the DSiWare version is the one to beat". The site gave it an 8 out of 10.

IGN gave it an 8.5 "Great" score, writing "The Oregon Trail may be too easy for its own good at first, but this is still a great play for any gamer. Older gamers that remember the original will get a kick out of the refresh while newcomers will enjoy a game that is always offering something new to do or look at. And everybody will love the game's awesome hand-drawn visuals that truly pop off the screen. This game is gorgeous".
