= Gunple: Gunman's Proof =

1997 video game

Gunple: Gunman’s Proof
- Developer: Lenar
- Publisher: ASCII
- Platform: Super Famicom
- Release: JP: January 31, 1997
- Genres: Action-adventure, shooter
- Mode: Single-player

Gunple: Gunman's Proof (ガンプル Gunman's Proof Gunman's Proof Ganpuru^{?}) is a 1997 Japanese video game for the Super Famicom. It was developed by Lenar and published by ASCII. It was one of the latest releases for the Super Famicom, and was never released outside of Japan. It is a 2D top down action-adventure video game set in the American Wild West that incorporates some science fiction elements.

== Story ==
The game is set on an island named Strange Island near the American Old West in the year 1880. Two meteors fell on the island and monsters suddenly started attacking people while leaving behind a message that said demiseed. Afterwards, a young farm hand sees an alien spacecraft crash in front of him, with two aliens emerging, named Zero and Goro. One of the aliens introduces himself as Zero, the Space Sheriff, and explains that an intergalactic criminal named Demi has escaped from justice and is hiding somewhere on the island, being the cause of all the troubles lately. The boy allows the alien to possess him so they can search for the fugitive.

== Gameplay ==
The player must explore eight dungeons scattered throughout the world. Dungeons can include places such as ancient ruins.

Guns can be fired in eight directions, and strafing can be achieved via L and R buttons. The setting has anachronistic elements, such as weapons that were not present during this time period. These include Uzi machine guns, robotic turtles, flamethrowers, and bazookas.

Zero possesses the player's body; allowing him to do tasks that are only possible as a part of a human being. Buying and upgrading weapons is essential to defeating the monsters once and for all. While featuring traditional dungeon-crawling components and many enemies to dispose of in real-time combat, weapons include pistols, shotgun, machine gun, and even a flamethrower (all with infinite ammo). There are also special attacks than can be done with all the weapon types.

This game uses a system of limited lives. Should a player die, they will be resurrected at the spot with full health restored. However, the player loses a life with an immediate game over occurring if the player loses his last life. Extra lives are awarded at dungeon completion or in treasure chests.

== Release ==
It was released on January 31, 1997, for the Super Famicom in Japan and published by ASCII. It was a very late release for the Super Famicom, and in fact Final Fantasy VII was released for the PlayStation in Japan on the same day. The game was never released outside of Japan, however an English language fan translation was later released.

== Reception ==
Upon release, four reviewers for Famitsu gave it a score of 26 out of 40.

Many reviewers noted the similarity between the game and The Legend of Zelda: A Link to the Past. Destructoid writer Allistair Pinsof described the gameplay as a mixture of A Link to the Past and Zombies Ate My Neighbors. Retro Gamer described the game as a "Zelda clone" with humor reminiscent of Earthbound. 1up.com listed the game in 2011 as one of the 'Six Must Play Super Nintendo Imports". Hobby Consolas in 2019 listed the game as one of the best JRPGs that never left Japan.
