= Wild West Guns =

2008 video game

- Developer: Gameloft Bucharest
- Publisher: Gameloft
- Producer: Philip Bouchet
- Designer: Stephane Varrault
- Programmer: Daniel Nay
- Artist: Arthur Hugot
- Composer: Arnaud Galand
- Platforms: Mobile phone Wii (WiiWare) iOS
- Release: Wii: PAL: August 1, 2008; NA: August 4, 2008; JP: August 5, 2008; iOS; February 5, 2009
- Genres: Action-adventure; Shooting
- Modes: Single-player, multiplayer

Wild West Guns is an action-adventure shooting video game developed by Gameloft Bucharest and published by Gameloft. It was released in 2011 for button-operated/keypad-based mobile phones, in August 2008 in Japan for the Wii and on February 5, 2009 worldwide for iOS devices via the Apple App Store.

== Gameplay ==
=== Mobile ===
The 2011 Java-based mobile version of Wild West Guns is a side-scrolling top-down open-world action-adventure video game. The game world may be traversed on foot or by horse. Missions involve fistfights, shooting, tailing or chasing, horse-riding, and/or setting off explosives. The player can buy weapons at shops and kill non-player characters (NPCs), and it is possible to call Jack Barnes's acquired horse to give a ride. If the player commits a crime within the line of sight of a Sheriff, they will gain a wanted level that will cause Sheriffs to turn hostile towards them. They may either hide or pay money at churches in order to decrease the wanted level.

=== Wii ===
An American Old West-themed light gun shooter, the game sees the player shooting at targets ranging from vultures, balloons and flying sombreros to armed robbers, angry gold diggers and renegade soldiers across a number of environments such as saloons, cemeteries and a speeding steam locomotive. The game features 6 levels across two difficulties, with 3 challenges in each.

The game also supports the Wii Zapper peripheral on the Wii, but does not feature aim calibration.

== Reception ==
Reception

Aggregate scores
Aggregator	Score	
Aggregator	iOS	Wii
GameRankings	72%	63%
Metacritic	N/A	65/100

Review scores
Publication	Score	
Publication	iOS	Wii
1Up.com	N/A	C+
Eurogamer	N/A	5/10
GamesMaster	N/A	75%
GameZone	N/A	5/10
IGN	7.2/10	6.8/10
NGamer	N/A	60%
Nintendo Life	N/A	7/10
Official Nintendo Magazine	N/A	80%

The Wii version of Wild West Guns received "mixed" reviews according to the review aggregation website Metacritic.

Official Nintendo Magazine praised the variety in settings and the interactive environments, and the simple point and shoot gameplay, though they felt genre experts might find it too easy. Nintendo Life felt the game was "addictive and attractive" and "very well executed", and highlighted the depth in gameplay that requires players to carefully choose their shots to score the most points. However, they felt the relatively small range of objectives, settings and enemies was "somewhat disappointing", and that the omission of scoreboards affected replay value.

In contrast, Eurogamer was less impressed with the Wii version, calling it "a rather limited and repetitive experience". 1UP.com believed said console version was "a little pricey" at 1000 Wii Points. IGN also had issues with the price and the shallow nature of the same console version, but otherwise felt it was "fun", praising the tight controls and polished presentation.
