= Himalaya Studios =

Video game developer

Himalayas Studios
- Type: Private
- Industry: Video games
- Founded: 2004
- Headquarters: United States
- Key people: Chris Warren; Britney Brimhall
- Website: Himalaya Studios

Himalaya Studios is a video game developer that focuses on adventure games. The limited liability company was established in 2004 in Chandler, Arizona by Britney K. Brimhall and Christopher T. Warren. In 2011, it was incorporated as a C Corporation in Delaware.

Himalaya Studios focuses on creating adventure games in the spirit of classic Sierra adventure games, like King's Quest, Space Quest, and Leisure Suit Larry. Founders Brimhall and Warren had originally created AGD Interactive, a non-profit company that is dedicated to updating original Sierra games to a more modern look.

The studio's first adventure game, Al Emmo and the Lost Dutchman's Mine, was released on September 5, 2006.

The studio released Mage's Initiation: Reign of the Elements in 2019. The game received an aggregated score of 70 on Metacritic, indicating mixed or average reviews. Game Critics praised the game's story and worldbuilding, but felt that the combat and mazes were repetitive. Adventure Gamers celebrated the game's art, as well as its writing, dialog and voice acting, but criticized its combat and role-playing game mechanics. GameSpot was similarly positive about the game's art and story, while criticizing its combat and cinematics. PC Invasion described playing the game as "like discovering a lost Sierra title from the VGA generation," but "[a]t its worst, it's a bit of an uninteresting slog."

== Games ==
| Title | Genre | Publication year |
|---|---|---|
| Al Emmo and the Lost Dutchman's Mine | Adventure game | 2006 |
| Al Emmo's Postcards from Anozira | Hidden object game | 2010 |
| Mage's Initiation: Reign of the Elements | Adventure game | 2019 |
