= Al Emmo and the Lost Dutchman's Mine =

2006 video game

- Developer: Himalaya Studios
- Publisher: Himalaya Studios
- Designers: Britney Brimhall; Christopher T. Warren
- Engine: Adventure Game Studio
- Platforms: Windows, Linux
- Release: September 5, 2006
- Genre: Adventure
- Mode: Single-player

Al Emmo and the Lost Dutchman's Mine is an adventure game created by Himalaya Studios for the PC.

== Development ==
Al Emmo and the Lost Dutchman's Mine pays homage to the classic point-and-click adventure games popularized by Sierra and LucasArts during the 1980s and 1990s. Developed as a nostalgic tribute to the genre, the game was released on September 5, 2006.

This is the first original and commercial game created by Himalaya Studios. The same team was also responsible for designing the King's Quest 1 and 2 remakes at AGD Interactive. The game runs on the popular Adventure Game Studio engine and shows off some of the engine's more versatile features, such as fully lip-synced dialogue portraits and its ability to handle complex animations.

The game utilizes hand-painted backgrounds and pre-rendered 3D character animation frames.

In September 2012, an enhanced edition of the game featuring reworked 2D animated cut scenes and a new protagonist voice actor was announced. The enhanced edition was released in November 2013 on the Himalaya Studios website, and was made available on the Steam platform in May 2014.

== Plot ==
The plot is loosely based on the popular Arizonan legend of the Lost Dutchman's Gold Mine.

The game's protagonist, Al Emmo, is stranded in the barren desert land of Anozira after being stood up by a mail-order bride whom he had hoped would impress his parents. Following this, Al misses his train back to New York and is stuck in the wild west for a whole week without money, housing, or any knowledge for his next course of action.

Later, Al develops feelings for another woman, Rita Peralto, a beautiful singer at the local saloon. Al believes he has a chance with her until Antonio Bandanna, a dashing Spaniard, arrives and begins upstaging him at every turn. Al soon hears a legend of a lost gold mine in the nearby desert. Al sets out to find it, believing that if he can cure Rita's financial troubles, he can win her affection. It's only upon arrival that he discovers the mine's haunted nature.

== Reception ==
Screenshot

Reception

Review score
Publication	Score
Adventure Gamers	3.5/5

Online magazine Adventure Gamers praised the "engaging" story, the characters and the "inventive" puzzles but criticized the "horrible character animation" and the "annoying" voice of Christopher T. Warren who plays the main character Al Emmo.
