= The Oregon Trail 4th Edition =

1999 video game

- Developer: MECC
- Publishers: The Learning Company (Riverdeep, Inc.); Selectsoft (Selectsoft Publishing)
- Series: The Oregon Trail
- Platforms: Microsoft Windows 95 (1.0 and 1.1), Mac OS 7.5 (1.1)
- Release: 1999 (Riverdeep, Inc.); 2005? (Selectsoft)
- Genre: Edutainment
- Mode: Single-player

The Oregon Trail 4th Edition is a 1999 video game, and the third sequel to The Oregon Trail. Players learn teamwork, supply management, critical-thinking, and decision-making.

== Gameplay ==
The game mechanics of this game are similar to that of the other The Oregon Trail games. It requires careful resource management in order to successfully travel across America toward the Western frontier. The player must overcome many obstacles and make tough decisions, which may result in loss for the greater good of the journey. The game begins in Independence, Missouri in 1848, where the player selects two people to form a wagon party. The game ends if both of these partners abandon the player. When a town or landmark is reached, players have the ability to use full-motion video or 3D graphics to explore the location.

== Critical reception ==
Eugene Register-Guard wrote "this respected program adds detail, richness, and flexibility...This program gets a high rating for its range of activities and its attention to history, geography, math, and many other skills". Games4Girls said: "I definitely agree with the age range. Anyone younger would have trouble with the game". A Videogame Canon described the game as "immensely popular".
