= The Oregon Trail (1985 video game) =

- 1990 MS-DOS cover art
- Developer: MECC
- Publisher: MECC
- Designer: R. Philip Bouchard
- Programmer: John Krenz
- Artist: Charolyn Kapplinger
- Series: The Oregon Trail
- Platforms: Apple II, MS-DOS, Mac, Windows
- Release: 1985: Apple II; 1990: MS-DOS; 1991: Mac; 1993: Windows
- Genre: Strategy

The Oregon Trail is an educational strategy video game developed and published by the Minnesota Educational Computing Consortium (MECC). It was first released in 1985 for the Apple II, with later ports to MS-DOS in 1990, Mac in 1991, and Microsoft Windows in 1993. It was created as a re-imagining of the popular text-based game of the same name, originally created in 1971 and published by MECC in 1975. In the game, the player assumes the role of a wagon leader guiding a party of settlers from Independence, Missouri, to Oregon's Willamette Valley via a covered wagon on the Oregon Trail in 1848. Along the trail, the player makes choices about supplies, resource management, and the route, and deals with hunting for food, crossing rivers, and random events such as storms and disease.

The game was designed and created by a team at MECC led by game designer R. Philip Bouchard over a ten-month period from 1984 to 1985. It was intended as a core part of MECC's shift from games and software on mainframe computers accessed by remote terminals to those on home computers, as well as MECC's first game intended primarily for home consumers rather than for schools. It is the first graphical and the most well known entry in the Oregon Trail series, and was MECC's flagship product from release until the company was bought by SoftKey in 1995. Games in the series have since been released in many editions by various developers and publishers, many titled The Oregon Trail. The multiple games in the series are often considered to be iterations on the same title, and they have collectively sold over 65 million copies and have been inducted into the World Video Game Hall of Fame. The game had widespread popularity in schools in the 1980s and 1990s, and has been described by publications such as the Smithsonian magazine as a cultural landmark.

== Gameplay ==
Travel screen (Apple II version), with the party having reached a landmark

The Oregon Trail is an educational strategy video game in which the player, as the leader of a wagon train, controls a group journeying down the Oregon Trail from Independence, Missouri, to Willamette Valley, Oregon, in 1848. The player controls the game via a keyboard, primarily by selecting one of several numbered options. They begin the game by selecting their character's profession—banker, carpenter, or farmer—which corresponds with difficulty levels and give different amounts of money with which to start the journey. They then name their character and their four party members, and purchase supplies for their journey from Matt's General Store: oxen to pull the wagon, food, clothing, ammunition, and spare parts to fix wagon breakdowns. The party then sets off on their journey. The path is divided into sixteen segments, each ending at a landmark such as a river crossing or a fort. Each landmark has different choices available to the player, such as purchasing supplies at a fort, talking to fellow travelers at a geographic landmark, or choosing how to cross a river. Rivers can be crossed by fording the river, caulking the wagon and floating across, or in some cases by paying for a ferry; the chance of crossing without failure, which can result in losing supplies or damaging the wagon, depends on the state of the river and the weather. As the party progresses further along the trail, the prices for supplies rise. At two landmarks, the player can choose to take a "cut-off", or shortcut; these paths are shorter but bypass the next landmark, a fort. For the final segment, the player can choose to either take a toll road cut-off to the end, or raft down the Columbia River by playing a minigame wherein they must dodge rocks in the river.

In between landmarks, the party journeys for days over a hundred miles, as shown to the player by a screen that displays the date, weather, health of the party, how many pounds of food the party has remaining, and the distances to the next landmark and from the previous. An animated ox-pulled wagon is shown, with a representation of the next landmark sliding towards it from the left as the party travels and a landscape of the terrain for that segment in the background. Random events can occur during the traveling phase, such as a storm causing a delay or a party member falling ill. The player can also stop the journey at any point, and can then check the status of their supplies, look at the map of their journey, change the pace of travel, change the amount of food rationed for the party per day, stop to rest, trade with other parties for supplies, or hunt for food. Changing the pace of travel affects how long each segment takes and also the likelihood of different events, such as oxen going lame, and changing the food rations similarly affects how quickly food supplies are used and the likelihood of events.

If the player chooses to hunt, they are shown a minigame where they control a human character that can be moved around a fixed screen containing a randomized assortment of rocks and plants based on the terrain of the segment the party is in. The player can choose to aim their gun in one of eight cardinal directions, start or stop moving in the direction they are aiming, and shoot, which fires a bullet that moves across the screen and uses up ammunition. Animals appear from the sides of the screen at random and move around the screen, and die if the player's shot hits them. When the player ends the minigame, they receive an amount of food based on what animals were killed, though a maximum of 100 pounds can be taken per hunt.

The game ends when the party reaches Willamette Valley by either the Columbia River or toll road, or when all five members of the party have died due to illness or injury. If the party reaches the end of the journey, they are given a score based on the ending conditions and supplies of the party and the starting profession, which is stored and displayed on a high score table showing previous attempts as well as pre-populated scores named after real travelers on the trail. If all party members die, the player is shown a gravestone with the party leader's name on it, and they can add an epitaph; on subsequent playthroughs the player can view the last gravestone made whenever they reach the point in the journey where it had been placed.

== Development ==
=== Original text game ===
In 1971, Don Rawitsch, Bill Heinemann, and Paul Dillenberger developed a text-based strategy video game titled The Oregon Trail for use in the 8th grade history class for which Rawitsch was a student teacher. The game was written in around 800 lines of HP Time-Shared BASIC for the Minneapolis school district's HP 2100 minicomputer, to which schools could connect via a teleprinter. It was popular with the class and other schools around the district, but was removed from the computer at the end of the semester. In 1974, the Minnesota Educational Computing Consortium (MECC), a state-funded organization that developed educational software for the classroom, hired Rawitsch as an entry-level liaison for local community colleges. MECC had a mainframe system to which schools around Minnesota could connect, and Rawitsch, with permission from Heinemann and Dillenberger, rewrote and expanded the game using historical data for the MECC's time-sharing system, releasing it in 1975. The 1975 mainframe game was the most popular software in the system for Minnesota schools for five years, with thousands of players monthly.

In 1978, MECC began to move away from centralized mainframe games and software and towards distributing programs for microcomputers; it also began encouraging schools to adopt the Apple II microcomputer, purchasing large amounts at a discount and reselling them to schools. MECC began converting several of their products to run on microcomputers, and John Cook adapted The Oregon Trail for the Apple II; though the text-based gameplay remained largely the same, he added a display of the player's position along the trail on a map between rounds, and added graphics to the hunting minigame. A version for the Atari 8-bit computers, again titled The Oregon Trail, was released in 1982. The Apple II version was included under the name Oregon as part of MECC's Elementary series, distributed to Minnesota schools for free and for profit to schools outside of the state, on Elementary Volume 6 in 1980. The Apple II version was ported to the Commodore 64 in 1984 as part of a collection like Elementary Volume 6 titled Expeditions. By the mid-1980s, MECC was selling their educational software to schools around the country, and The Oregon Trail was their most popular product by far.

=== 1985 game ===
By 1984, the educational game market had shifted from one in which programs were almost invariably mainframe computer games created by amateur programmers like Rawitsch to a commercial market containing numerous companies selling educational games for home computers. MECC had moved into this market the year before, hiring programmers to create original software titles for schools and home consumers. These titles had proven successful, and MECC decided to create modern updates to their three most popular titles of the 1970s: Lemonade Stand, Odell Lake, and The Oregon Trail. All three games had received ports to the Apple II by 1980, but had not been changed substantially and did not compete graphically with contemporary titles. Development of a new version of The Oregon Trail began in October 1984, with R. Philip Bouchard as the lead designer and team lead. Bouchard was instructed to design an entirely new game based on the concept of the original Oregon Trail, intended for the Apple II and as MECC's first game with home consumers as the primary market, with a target release date of autumn 1985.

As the game was intended for the home market rather than school settings, it needed to be entertaining as well as educational; Bouchard set as a guiding principle that the entertainment "should arise from immersing the player in a historically accurate experience", and conversely that the educational aspect should arise from that immersion rather than explicitly instructing the player about history. Bouchard also intended the game to appeal to girls as well as boys, who he felt had been more interested in the original version of the game. He measured the game as it was being developed by the metric of whether children that liked the original game enjoyed the new game more. Development of the game took ten months, from October 1984 through July 1985, and was primarily done by a team of five people: Bouchard, lead programmer John Krenz, lead artist Charolyn Kapplinger, researcher Shirley Keran, and programmer Bob Granvin. While prior games at MECC had been developed using a system where the lead designer created a design document of notes and sketches that was then given to the programmers and artists to accomplish, Bouchard instead designed the game with the help of the other team members as a set of interconnected gameplay systems, all based on mathematical models in turn based on historical data, which would be refined in an iterative process as development proceeded.

For many parts of the game which resemble the original, the team added complexity and detail. In the 1975 game, the player plays through twelve rounds of decision making, each representing two weeks on the trail, with random events occurring in the rounds based on their historical probability at that point on the trail. For the new version, the team instead divided the game into 16 segments of varying lengths, each ending at a "landmark"; the player has a set of "activities" that could take place at each landmark, such as crossing a river, and a different set of activities, including hunting and having a random event occur, that they could do or have happen to them while traveling between landmarks. Each segment of the game had different environmental settings and probabilities, and the traveling periods are composed of some number of days which then act as the unit of time. Bouchard worked with Keran to pick the sixteen landmarks, as well as alternate "cutoff" routes that the player could take. The team removed the medicine and doctor system of the original as historically inaccurate, and instead added multiple types of disease. They also added music to the game, which was based on melodies popular at the time of the actual Oregon Trail.

The hunting minigame had been a popular part of the original game, where the player typed "BANG" to fire; as such the team felt it was an essential component to include in the new game. Bouchard wanted to include educational lessons as part of the game, including showing different landscape features based on where the player was on their journey, having different species of animals be present based also on where in the country they could be found, and limiting how many pounds of meat the player could take back from a hunt. The team was concerned that their design was not going to be possible using the Applesoft BASIC programming language on an Apple II like the rest of the game as it would not be fast enough; most other action games or sequences created at the time used assembly language for this reason. They first created a prototype to test it, and found that it ran too slowly; assembly programmer Roger Shimada was added to the team to create the final version. As he did so, the team discovered that the original design, which called for eighteen different animals, was too large for the memory space on the Apple II, and it was cut down to six animals with less complex animations. During the user testing in March 1985, as the "dead state" graphics had not yet been completed by Kapplinger, Shimada instead flipped animals upside down to indicate their deaths; this was kept in the final game, as the team and child playtesters found it humorous.

While designing the game, Bouchard planned to have a minigame at the end of the game involving rafting down the Columbia River, which would involve rapids, portaging, and the option to hire Native American guides. Development of the minigame was pushed towards the end of the project, as it was deemed less important than parts of the game that would be seen more than once per playthrough. In March 1985, however, Bouchard was instructed to stop development on any part of the game that had not already been started, eliminating the minigame. Bouchard was concerned, as this left the game without a climactic ending, though it would have been difficult to create the entire design at that point in the project. Late in the project, his supervisor agreed to reinstate the minigame, but only if it could be done simply and in Applesoft BASIC, unlike the hunting minigame. The team was able to borrow programmer Steve Splinter to develop the rafting portion, and quickly created a much simpler version based on dodging rocks in the river.

Bouchard's primary design goal for the project was to incorporate accurate geography into the game with the segments; his second goal was to add human characters into the game, which had not been present in the 1975 version. Many of his ideas for this goal had to be cut from the game due to both the limitations of the game's budget as well as the size available for the game on a 5¼-inch floppy disk. He retained the addition of player-named characters to the traveling party, as well as named characters to talk to at the start and landmarks, and including people in the graphics. One idea he was not able to keep, which he later described as his biggest regret about the game, was complex interactions with Native Americans, though he was able to include some simpler ones. Other priorities were including river crossings, for which the team built a system that takes into account the location and weather of the crossing, and adding replayability, which he accomplished by adding a point system with difficult high scores to beat, multiple starting options, and a challenging hunting minigame. The team accomplished all of the goals they set out to do, and although the project ran over the original budget and timeline—as Bouchard had originally estimated they would be complete by March but they instead finished in July—The Oregon Trail was published in autumn 1985 as planned.

=== Later versions ===
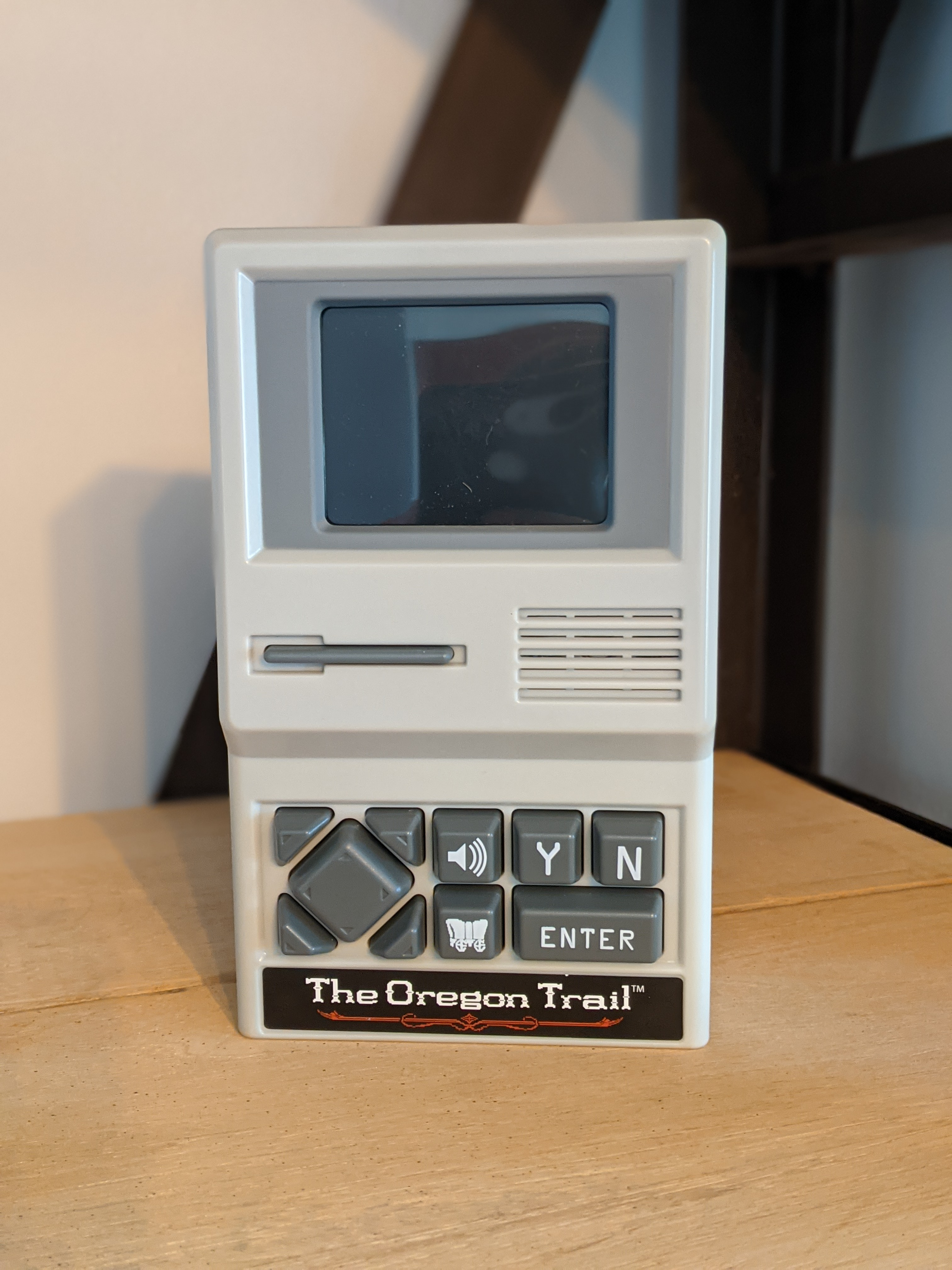
The Oregon Trail handheld version

After the initial Apple II release in 1985, The Oregon Trail was ported by MECC to several other platforms. An MS-DOS version was released in 1990, with slightly modified graphics. It was followed by a version for Classic Mac OS in 1991 and then, in 1992, The Oregon Trail Deluxe for MS-DOS. The latter two releases altered the game's interface to be controlled with a mouse instead of a keyboard and added simple sound effects and eight different profession options. The graphics of the game were also overhauled, though the Mac version was monochrome and the Deluxe version supports 256 color VGA. A final version for Windows under the original title was released in 1993. In 2018, a version of The Oregon Trail was released as a handheld electronic game by Basic Fun, initially as a Target exclusive.

== Reception and legacy ==
The Oregon Trail was extremely successful, and, along with successive iterations of the game, which are often considered different versions of the game instead of different games, it sold over 65 million copies by 2011. In 1994, when MECC became a publicly traded company, the game was still the company's flagship product, with its sales comprising a third of MECC's US$30 million in annual revenue.

The multiple versions of The Oregon Trail are often combined when discussing the game's legacy, though the 1985 release is considered the main version; Colin Campbell of Polygon, for example, has described it collectively as one of the most successful games of all time and a cultural icon, but said that the 1985 version "is the one most people recall". Matt Smith of Kotaku called it "one of the most iconic and grueling games to hit the classroom computer", and said that the 1985 version was the one "that rose to stardom and eventually spawned countless memes" and "etched its legacy in the memory of a generation". Kevin Wong of Vice claimed that the collective game was "synonymous with edutainment". The Oregon Trail has been described in Serious Games and Edutainment Applications as "one of the most famous ancestors" of the serious game subgenre. The Oregon Trail was a hallmark in American elementary schools in the 1980s and 1990s. Smithsonian magazine observed in 2016 that "The Oregon Trail is still a cultural landmark for any school kid who came of age in the 1980s or after. Even now, there remains a constant pressure to revive the series, so that nostalgic Generation Xers and Millennials can amble westward with a dysentery-riddled party once again."

In 2016, The Oregon Trail, viewed collectively as multiple versions of the same game from 1971 on, was inducted into the World Video Game Hall of Fame by The Strong and the International Center for the History of Electronic Games, the first educational game to be inducted and the only one until Where in the World Is Carmen Sandiego? (1985) in 2021. Time named the game as one of the 100 greatest video games in 2012, and placed it 9th on its list of the 50 best games in 2016, claiming that it "helped introduce an entire generation (several, in fact) to video games".

Several further games have been released in The Oregon Trail series, many under the title The Oregon Trail, beginning with Oregon Trail II in 1995, as well as a number of spinoffs such as The Yukon Trail and The Amazon Trail. The first few of these were published by SoftKey, which purchased MECC in 1995, with later titles developed and published by numerous other companies; The Oregon Trail 4th Edition (1999) was the final game developed by MECC. The 2021 The Oregon Trail was described by developer Gameloft Brisbane as a full remake of the 1985 game. It was released on Apple Arcade and became the platform's most downloaded game of the year, and was followed by versions for PC and consoles.

A copy of the Apple II version of The Oregon Trail that became widely distributed among video game pirates contains a player-generated epitaph reading "Here lies andy; peperony and chease" [sic]. This epitaph spawned a popular Internet meme and was referenced in the official Oregon Trail card game. The archivist Trevor Owens wrote that this bit of user-generated content "illustrates the ways that folkloric objects ... are very much still a part of our digital preservation ecosystem. In this case, a joke from one of the users enters the canonical story around the game."
