= The Oregon Trail (Pressman Toys series) =

Card game and board game series produced by Pressman Toy Corporation

The Oregon Trail is a series of card games and a board game based on the video game of the same name, produced by Pressman Toy Corporation.

== The Oregon Trail Card Game ==
The Oregon Trail Card Game
- Players: 2–6
- Setup time: 5 minutes
- Playing time: 30 minutes
- Age range: 12+

The first card game was released on August 1, 2016. The game is exclusively distributed through Target, although copies are also available via Amazon.com. The game components are in the style of 8-bit video games to emulate the look and feel of the original releases.

=== Gameplay ===
The object of The Oregon Trail card game is to follow the Oregon Trail from Independence, Missouri, to the Willamette Valley, Oregon, with a party of two to six players. Players write their names, or "frontier name" aliases, on a roster. On the back of the roster are tombstones, which can be customized when players die, as in the original video game. Players play trail cards to progress, with the players needing to play 50 cards to win. Each trail card ends on the left, right, or middle of the card, and a subsequent trail card must be placed to smoothly connect to the previous one. Of the 56 trail cards, 46 have consequences associated with them, such as rolling a die to cross a river, which can result in the player losing a supply card or dying. Other trail cards require the player to draw a calamity card, which represent accidents such as snakebites, dead oxen, typhoid, or dysentery. There are sixteen unique calamity cards, with one in eight resulting in instant death. Calamity cards that do not result in instant death can be remedied by supply cards, of which there are seven different types, including clean water, ammunition, and medicine. Other trail cards represent forts or towns, allowing the player to resupply. All players win if one or more players are still alive after the 50th card is played. A successful game should take around 30 minutes to play.

=== Reception ===
Writing for Ars Technica, Megan Geuss complained that some cards have ambiguous instructions or are hard to understand, but praised the cooperative aspect as "refreshing" and stated that players in her group "weren't bored by the end". She concluded that winning the game is "really hard" and that her group never did.

== The Oregon Trail: Hunt For Food Card Game ==
The Oregon Trail: Hunt For Food Card Game
- Players: 2–6
- Age range: 12+

This card game is based on the hunting trip portion of the video game, except the players' goal is to collect 600 pounds of meat.

== The Oregon Trail: Journey to Willamette Valley ==
The Oregon Trail: Journey to Willamette Valley The Oregon Trail Game: Journey to Willamette Valley (box title)
- Players: 2–4
- Age range: 13+

The Oregon Trail: Journey to Willamette Valley is a board game for 2–4 players, where players start the trip from Independence, Missouri in 1844 to Willamette Valley. Each player has 4 family members as in the first The Oregon Trail video game, but has the ability to upgrade their wagon.
