= The Oregon Trail (1971 video game) =

Text-based strategy game

- Picture of teleprinter output of the game, featuring a single round of gameplay
- Developers: Don Rawitsch, Bill Heinemann, and Paul Dillenberger
- Publisher: MECC
- Series: The Oregon Trail
- Platforms: Minicomputer (HP 2100); Mainframe (CDC Cyber 70/73-26); Apple II, Atari 8-bit, Commodore 64
- Release: Original: NA: December 3, 1971; MECC: NA: 1975
- Genre: Strategy
- Mode: Single-player

The Oregon Trail is a text-based strategy video game developed by Carleton College students Don Rawitsch, Bill Heinemann, and Paul Dillenberger in 1971 and produced by the Minnesota Educational Computing Consortium (MECC) beginning in 1975. It was developed as an early mainframe game to teach school children about the realities of 19th-century pioneer life on the Oregon Trail. In the game, the player assumes the role of a wagon leader guiding a party of settlers from Independence, Missouri, to Oregon City, Oregon via a covered wagon in 1847. Along the way the player must purchase supplies, hunt for food, and make choices on how to proceed along the trail while encountering random events such as storms and wagon breakdowns. The original versions of the game contain no graphics, as they were developed for computers that used teleprinters instead of computer monitors. A later Apple II port added a graphical shooting minigame.

The first version of the game was developed over the course of two weeks for use by Rawitsch in a history unit at Jordan Junior High School in Minneapolis. Despite its popularity with the students, it was deleted from the school district's mainframe computer at the end of the school semester. Rawitsch recreated the game in 1974 for the MECC, which distributed educational software for free in Minnesota and for sale elsewhere, and recalibrated the probabilities of events based on historical journals and diaries for the game's release the following year. After the rise of microcomputers in the 1970s, the MECC released several versions of the game over the next decade for the Apple II, Atari 8-bit computers, and Commodore 64 computers, before redesigning it as a graphical commercial game for the Apple II under the same name in 1985.

The game is the first entry in The Oregon Trail series; games in the series have since been released in many editions by various developers and publishers, many titled The Oregon Trail. The multiple games in the series are often considered to be iterations on the same title, and have collectively sold over 65 million copies and have been inducted into the World Video Game Hall of Fame. The series has also inspired a number of spinoffs such as The Yukon Trail and The Amazon Trail.

== Gameplay ==
The Oregon Trail is a text-based strategy video game in which the player, as the leader of a wagon train, controls a group journeying down the Oregon Trail from Independence, Missouri, to Oregon City, Oregon, in 1847. The player purchases supplies, then plays through about 12 rounds of decision-making, each representing two weeks on the trail. Each round begins with the player being told their current distance along the trail and the date, along with their current supplies. Supplies consist of food, bullets, clothing, miscellaneous supplies, and cash, each given as a number. Players are given the option to hunt for food, and in some rounds to stop at a fort to purchase supplies, and then choose how much food to consume that round. The game closes the round by randomly selecting one or two events and weather conditions. The events include storms damaging supplies, wagons breaking down, and attacks by wild animals or "hostile riders"; weather conditions can slow travel, which can increase the rounds needed to reach Oregon.

When hunting, or when attacked, the game prompts the player to type a word—"BANG" in the original version, or a randomly selected word like "BANG" or "POW" in later versions—with misspellings resulting in no effect. When hunting, the faster the word is typed, the more food is gathered. The game ends when the player reaches Oregon or dies along the trail; death can occur due to an attack or by running out of supplies. Running out of food results in starvation, while lack of clothing in cold weather, low levels of food, or random events such as snakebite or a hunting accident lead to illness; this results in death if the player does not have miscellaneous supplies for minor or regular illnesses, such as cholera, and typhoid fever, or dysentery, or cannot afford a doctor in the case of serious illnesses.

== Development ==
=== Original version ===
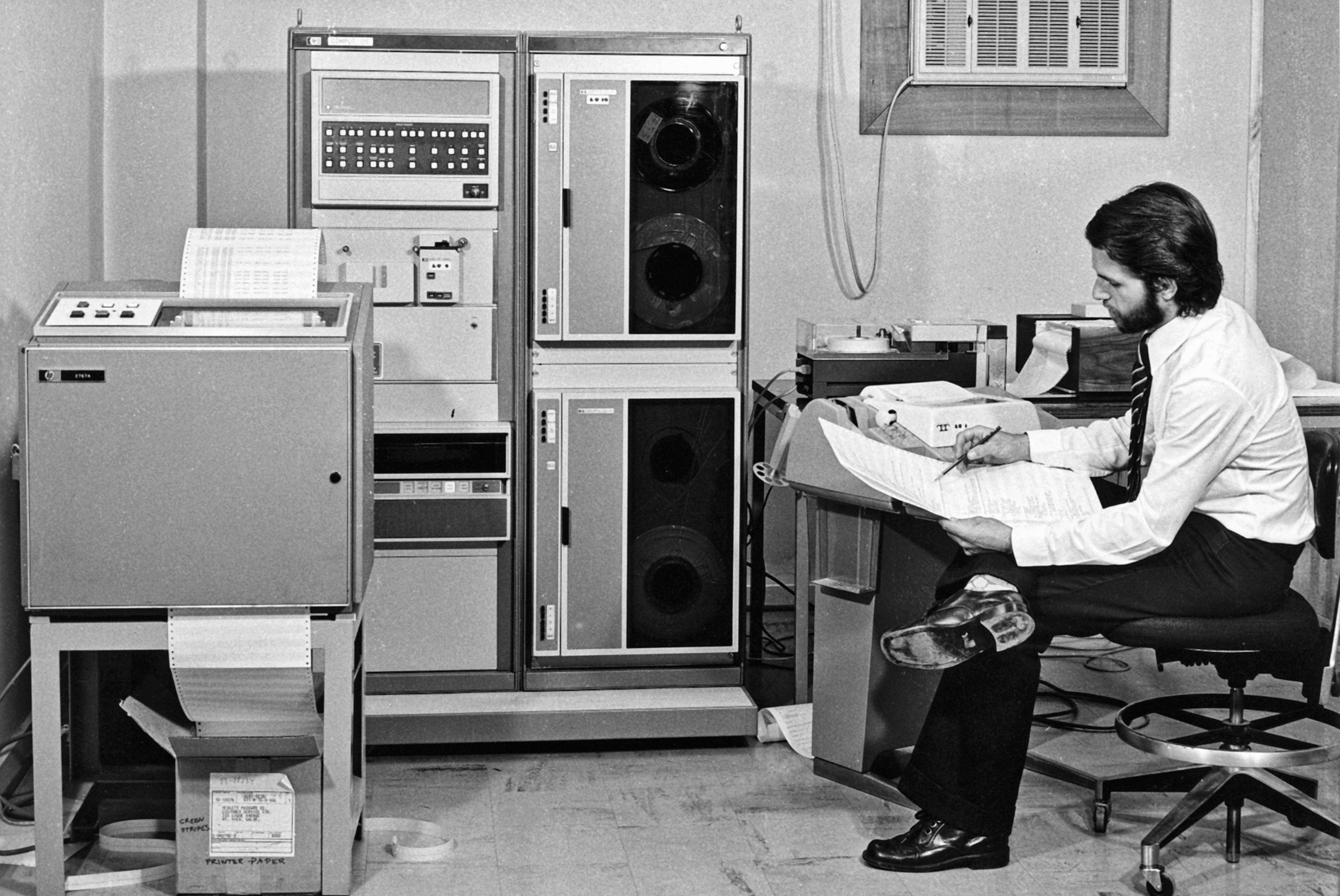
HP 2100 minicomputer

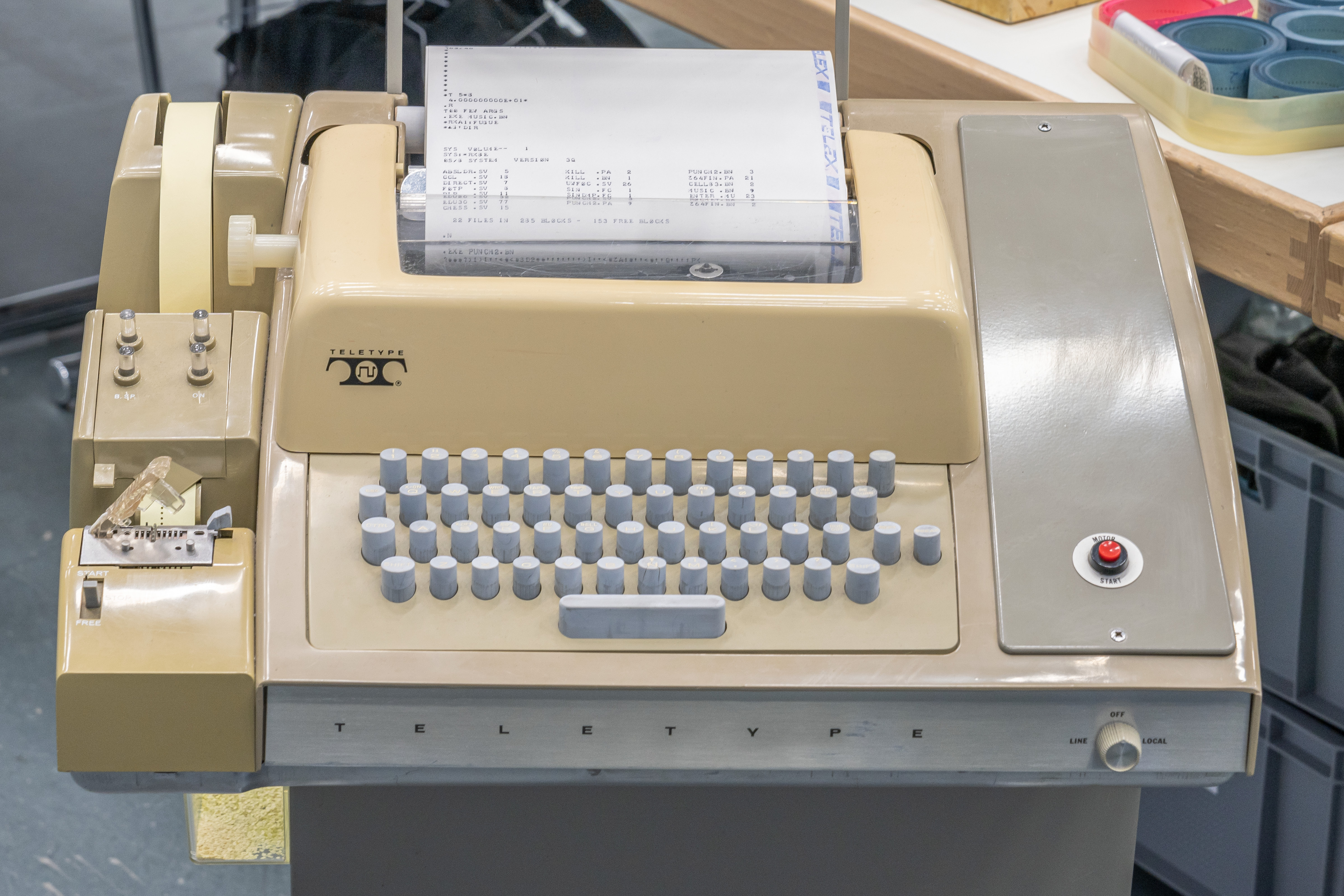
Teletype ASR-33 teleprinter, a widely used computer terminal.

In 1971, Don Rawitsch, a history major and senior at Carleton College in Northfield, Minnesota, taught an 8th-grade history class at Jordan Junior High School in Minneapolis as a student teacher. His supervising teacher assigned him to prepare a unit on "The Western Expansion of the Mid-19th Century", and Rawitsch decided to create a board game activity about the Oregon Trail for the students. After one week of planning the lessons, he was in the process of drawing out the trail on sheets of paper on the floor of his apartment when his roommates, fellow Carleton students Bill Heinemann and Paul Dillenberger, came in. Heinemann, who along with Dillenberger was a math student and student teacher with experience in programming, discussed the project with Rawitsch, and told him that it would be well-suited to a computer program, as it could keep track of the player's progress and calculate their chances of success based on their supplies instead of a dice roll. Rawitsch was initially hesitant, as the unit needed to be completed within two weeks, but Heinemann and Dillenberger felt it could be done if they worked on it for long hours each day. The trio then spent the weekend designing and coding the game on paper.

The Minneapolis school district had recently purchased an HP 2100 minicomputer, and the schools the trio were teaching in, like the other schools in the district, were connected to it via a single teleprinter. These teleprinters could send and print messages from programs running on the central computer. The video game industry was in its infancy in 1971, and the three had no resources to draw on to develop the game software beyond their own programming knowledge; instead, they spent two weeks working and coding in HP Time-Shared BASIC on their own. Rawitsch focused on the design and historical portions of the game, while Heinemann and Dillenberger did the programming, working on the teleprinter kept in a small room that was formerly a janitor's closet at the school they taught at, Bryant Junior High School, as well as bringing it to the apartment to continue working. Heinemann focused on the overall programming flow, and came up with the hunting minigame, while Dillenberger made subroutines for the game to use, wrote much of the text displayed to the player, and tested for bugs in the code. As there was only one terminal, Heinemann wrote code on paper while Dillenberger entered it into the system along with his own.

They implemented the basics of the game in those two weeks, including purchasing supplies, making choices at specific points of the journey, and the hunting minigame. They also included the random events happening to the player, and Heinemann had the idea to make the random events tied to the geography of the trail, so that cold weather events would be more likely in the mountains and attacks more likely in the plains. They also added small randomization of outcomes such as the amount of food gained from hunting; they expected that in order for the children to be interested in playing the game multiple times there needed to be variations between plays. Heinemann and Dillenberger let some students at their school play it to test, including future musician Prince; the students were enthusiastic about the game, staying late at school to play. The other teachers were not as interested, but did recommend changes to the game, particularly removing negative depictions of Native Americans as they were based more on Western movies and television than history, and could be problematic towards the several students with Native American ancestry at the schools.

The Oregon Trail debuted to Rawitsch's classes on December 3, 1971. He was unsure whether the students would be interested in the game, as they had had limited exposure to computers and several seemed uninterested in history altogether. After he unveiled it, students would line up outside the door for their turn and stay after school for another chance. Rawitsch has recounted that, as only one student could use the teleprinter at one time and he could only reserve it for one week, he had the students play in groups, and they organized themselves into voting for responses and delegating students to handle hunting, following the map, and keeping track of supplies. Other teachers at the school came up with "flimsy excuses" for their students to try the game as well. The trio adjusted the game's code as the students played in response to bugs, like the one that allowed the purchase of clothes for negative money. As the school district shared a single central minicomputer, schools across the city began to play the game as well. When the semester and their student teaching term ended, the team printed out copies of the source code—about 800 lines of code—and deleted the program from the computer.

=== MECC version ===
In 1974, Rawitsch was hired by the Minnesota Educational Computing Consortium (MECC), a state-funded organization that developed educational software for the classroom, as an entry-level liaison for local community colleges. The MECC had a similar system to the Minneapolis school district's setup in 1971, with a CDC Cyber 70/73-26 mainframe computer which schools across the state could connect to via terminals. The system contained several educational programs, and Rawitsch's boss let him know that it was open to submissions. Rawitsch, with permission from Heinemann and Dillenberger, spent the 1974 Thanksgiving weekend copying and adjusting the printed BASIC source code into the system. Rather than submit the recreated copy, he instead improved the game with research on the events of the Oregon Trail that he had not had time for with the original version, and changed the frequency and types of random events, such as bad weather or wagons breaking down, to be based on the actual historical probabilities for what happened to travelers on the trail at each location in the game. Rawitsch calculated the probabilities himself, basing them on historical diaries and narratives of people on the trail that he read. He also added more positive depictions of Native Americans, who his research indicated provided help to settlers along the trail. He placed The Oregon Trail into the organization's time-sharing network in 1975, where it could be accessed by schools across Minnesota.

== Legacy ==
The 1975 early mainframe game was the most popular software in the system for Minnesota schools for five years, drawing thousands of players monthly. Rawitsch, Heinemann, and Dillenberger were not publicly acknowledged as the creators of the original game until 1995, when MECC honored them in a ceremony at the Mall of America. By then, several versions of the game had been created. Rawitsch published the source code of The Oregon Trail in Creative Computing's May–June 1978 issue, along with some of the historical information he had used to refine the statistics. That year MECC began encouraging schools to adopt the Apple II microcomputer, purchasing large amounts at a discount and reselling them to schools. MECC began converting several of their products to run on microcomputers, and John Cook adapted the game for the Apple II; though the text-based gameplay remained largely the same, he added a display of the player's position along the trail on a map between rounds, and replaced the typing in the hunting and attack minigame with a graphical version in which a deer or attacker moves across the screen and the player presses a key to fire at it. A version for Atari 8-bit computers, again titled The Oregon Trail, was released in 1982. The Apple II version was included under the name Oregon as part of MECC's Elementary series, distributed to Minnesota schools for free and for profit to schools outside of the state, on Elementary Volume 6 in 1980. Oregon was ported to the Commodore 64 in 1984 as part of a collection like Elementary Volume 6 titled Expeditions. By the mid-1980s, MECC was selling their educational software to schools around the country, and The Oregon Trail was their most popular product by far.

In 1985, MECC produced a fully graphical version of the game for Apple II computers, redesigned by R. Philip Bouchard as a greatly expanded product for home consumers under the same name. The Oregon Trail was extremely successful, and along with successive versions of the game it sold over 65 million copies. Several further games have been released in The Oregon Trail series, many under the title The Oregon Trail, as well as a number of spinoffs such as The Yukon Trail and The Amazon Trail.

The original Oregon Trail has been described in Serious Games and Edutainment Applications as "one of the most famous ancestors" of the serious game subgenre. The text-based and graphical versions of The Oregon Trail are often described as different iterations of the same game when discussing the game's legacy; Colin Campbell of Polygon, for example, has described it collectively as one of the most successful games of all time, calling it a cultural icon. Kevin Wong of Vice claimed that the collective game was "synonymous with edutainment". Due to its widespread popularity, The Oregon Trail, referring to all versions of the game released over 40 years, was inducted into the World Video Game Hall of Fame in 2016. Time named the game as one of the 100 greatest video games in 2012, and placed it 9th on its list of the 50 best games in 2016.
