= Oregon Trail II =

1995 video game

- CD cover art
- Developer: MECC
- Publisher: SoftKey Multimedia
- Composer: Eric Speier
- Platforms: Windows, Mac OS
- Release: February 8, 1995
- Genre: Educational
- Mode: Single-player

Oregon Trail II is an educational video game released by MECC in 1995. It was published by SoftKey Multimedia. It is a revised version of the original The Oregon Trail video game. It was redesigned with the help of American Studies PhD Wayne Studer.

In addition to the regular edition, MECC released a 25th Anniversary Limited Edition Oregon Trail II Computer Game. The CD-ROM came with an official strategy guide and certificate of authenticity, all packaged in a commemorative wooden storage box.

Another release of the game on CD-ROM featured both Oregon Trail II, version 1.2 and Logic Quest 3D, version 1.0.

== Development ==
Oregon Trail II gameplay

Oregon Trail II's graphics are considerably more detailed than those in the original. In addition, events such as diseases (including dysentery, measles, cholera, and others), obstacles on the path, accidents while traveling, and even interactions with other groups in one's wagon train involve being directed to choose a course of action from a set of multiple choices.

== Gameplay ==
When players start a new game, they can choose their name, occupation, level, date of travel, their starting point and destination, and type of wagon. Also, they may select how many others are with them in their wagon, as well as their names and ages. After choosing an occupation, the player can select various skills. The player picks skills with a 120-point limit; automatic skills are free. The more important the skill is, the more it costs. Each skill can make good events more likely to happen, and bad events less likely to happen. While some occupations have more money than others, the low-income occupations get a greater final bonus, which proves crucial in achieving a high score at the end of the game. However, if the player settles at a destination other than the original location they had selected at the beginning of the game, they will not receive a bonus, regardless of their chosen occupation.

Oregon Trail II includes far more detail than the original. For instance, rafting down the Columbia River is a much greater challenge than it was in the original game. Whenever an event (e.g. an accident or illness) happens, the game halts and the player must make a choice of action, so it is much more interactive than the previous version. Players are also able to talk with other settlers along the way and ask for their advice. At any point in the game, if the player dies, the game is over. This version also allows the player to choose any year from 1840 through 1860 rather than being fixed to 1848 as it was in the original. Travel is much easier in later years, as there are more towns and trading posts along the way for resupply.

Outfitting the supplies and choosing the parties equipment in their journey becomes a possible point of player control leading to increased scoring chances. Additional supplies though will mean adding weight to the player's wagon. When the wagon's weight limit is reached, it is not possible to continue along the trail, and some goods will have to be abandoned. The game offers players an immense selection of supplies available for purchase. During the start of the game, package deals are available up to six months of provisions, but numerous perils in the game will cause many provisions to be lost or used for trade. One has the option of taking a computer generated "package deal", ostensibly offered by the trailhead town's merchants. The player can also shop in the town and choose a custom strategy, quantities, tools and so forth or take the package and then shop or trade in addition to that. One problem with the package is finding someone to trade unwanted items for useful ones. Conversely, some assets are only available by the package (e.g. chains, anvils, plows) or by trading, though many of those can be purchased from merchants or blacksmiths further down the trails. If the player decides to purchase supplies without the package, they may buy chains or anvils from Westport, Fort Kearny, or Fort Laramie. All forts or towns with a blacksmith's shop will sell chains, nails (measured in pounds), and anvils.

== 25th Anniversary Limited Edition ==
Oregon Trail II 25th Anniversary Limited Edition
- Developer: MECC
- Publisher: SoftKey Multimedia
- Platforms: Mac OS 7.1, Microsoft Windows 3.1, Microsoft Windows 95
- Release: 1996
- Genre: Educational
- Mode: Single-player

This version includes Oregon Trail II 1.3, Oregon Trail for DOS 2.1, Oregon Trail Deluxe VGA 3.01, Oregon Trail for Windows 1.2, a series of five interview videos for Oregon Trail game history, a collector's wooden box package with branded artwork on the sides, The Oregon Trail Strategy Guide, $25.00 rebate coupons for MECC/SoftKey International products and a limited-edition stamped certificate of authenticity.

== Remake ==
The Oregon Trail 5th Edition: Adventures Along the Oregon Trail
- Developers: Broderbund (Riverdeep, Inc., LLC)
- Publishers: The Learning Company (Riverdeep, Inc., LLC); Selectsoft (Selectsoft Publishing)
- Platforms: Mac OS 8.6, Microsoft Windows 98
- Release: 2001-04-01 (Riverdeep, Inc.); 2005? (Selectsoft)
- Genre: Educational
- Mode: Single-player

The Oregon Trail 5th Edition: Adventures Along the Oregon Trail is a 2001 video game, and the sequel to The Oregon Trail 4th Edition.

=== Gameplay ===
The game design is based on Oregon Trail II but adds various new features to the game. The plant gathering feature was carried over from the 3rd and 4th editions. The "Wild Fruits and Vegetables" event from Oregon Trail II is removed. This feature involves identifying which plants are edible and which are poisonous. Incidentally, the option to "go look for edible plants" whenever someone is diagnosed with scurvy was kept. The player can also go fishing. Updated graphics have been provided for river crossings. There are also added cinematics which follow the fictional journey of the three Montgomery children: Parker, Cassie, and Jimmy, who leave Independence accompanied by an African American trailblazer named Captain Jed Freedman to search for the children's father in Oregon. Various points of the children's story are triggered when the player reaches a certain destination on the trail, which ranges from dangerous experiences (Jimmy is bitten by a snake) to campfire scenes where Captain Jed would tell a story that reflects other historically accurate incidents (e.g. the Donner Party, the California Gold Rush, and the Santa Fe Trail). The conversation pictures are no longer animated. The soundtrack of Oregon Trail II has also been removed, replaced with a single repeating audio loop.

== Marketing ==
As part of the 25th anniversary of Oregon Trail, an online version called Oregon Trail Online was produced.
