= The Yukon Trail =

1994 educational computer game

- Cover art
- Developer: MECC
- Publisher: MECC
- Designer: MECC
- Platforms: Windows 3.x, Macintosh
- Release: NA: 1994
- Genres: Simulation, educational, strategy
- Mode: Single-player

The Yukon Trail is a 1994 educational computer game from the Minnesota Educational Computing Consortium (MECC), similar to their previous Oregon Trail series but set during the Klondike Gold Rush of the late 19th century. Players start out in Seattle and must make decisions concerning supplies, a partner, and travel plans as they head to Alaska before boating down a river to Dawson City and staking a claim to mine for gold. The game features the famous author Jack London and authentic 19th-century photographs that show what life was like back then.

== Gameplay ==
Screenshot of conversation with Jack London.

=== Start ===
The game starts in Seattle in August 1897 (right before the actual Klondike Gold Rush). The player must first choose one out of four partners. Each partner has unique advantages over the others. Next the player purchases two tickets for a ship to Skagway or Dyea. Tickets are more expensive for ships that depart immediately, and less expensive for those departing later. The player can buy equipment, food and other items, or they can wait until they get to Alaska. The player's partner can offer their advice on making purchases, but their advice is sometimes unwise. Upon reaching Skagway or Dyea, the player can purchase any supplies, gamble or gather information. Gambling takes the form of a War card game or a shell game, but can be unfair and lead to losses for the most part. Gambling can be disabled in the settings.

When starting the journey the player can choose the longer and easier White Pass Trail or the shorter but more difficult Chilkoot Trail. The player can also hire packers in the two cities that would haul their supplies to the respective routes. The packers are very expensive, so they usually are out of reach for the average player.

=== The Trail ===
The Yukon Trail gives players plenty of opportunities to think about the situation, giving many options and many possible consequences for each event, thus building problem-solving skills. The initial choice players make on the trail, which can be subsequently changed, is the load personally carried. A smaller load results in the ground moved each day to become shorter (as some of the supplies have to be left behind and then returned for). Moreover, the trail becomes much more difficult to travel when encroaching upon the winter months, but a larger load will result in a higher probability of the player or partner being injured.

Midway down the trail, the player and partner stop at a camp. They can then buy or sell goods before climbing the mountain pass leading to the Canada–US border where they pay a toll to pass into the Yukon Territory. The North-West Mounted Police will not let them pass unless they have 1,000 pounds of food per person. They are also required to pay a tax to bring goods into Canada. After the price for the tax is given, if the player does not have enough, the Mountie will simply take whatever money they have.

Along the trail, numerous random events may occur, including someone being injured (the player decides to continue at a slower pace or to rest), theft of food, rockslides, crowds of people or abandoned animals, and sudden inclement weather.

Periodically, the player stops at landmarks along the journey, where players can learn historical facts about each location. Some of these landmarks include the Dead Horse Trail, the totem poles, and the three rapids: Miles Canyon, White Horse Rapids and Five Finger Rapids.

=== The River ===
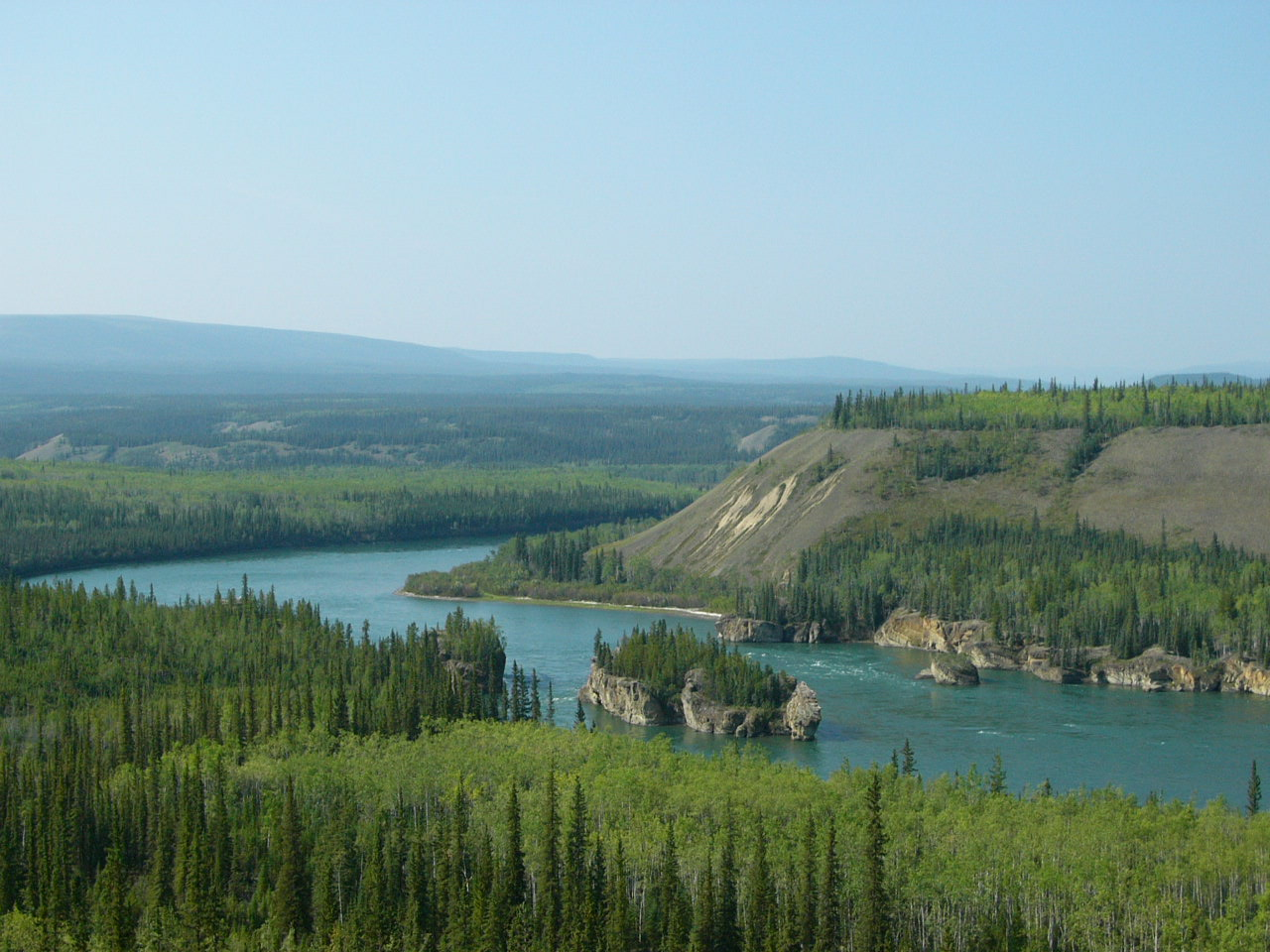
Five Finger Rapids is among the landmarks featured in The Yukon Trail. This 2005 photo shows the Five Finger Rapids as viewed from the Klondike Highway.

The player and partner arrive at Bennett Lake after hiking into Canada. While there, they meet the legendary Mountie Sam Steele. During the winter they need to acquire a whipsaw if they do not already have one and then build one of three boats. Once the spring arrives and the ice has melted, the player and partner can embark with their boat. Depending on the date of their arrival at Lake Bennett, Sam Steele will let them depart right away, or have them wait two or four days before departure.

On the river, the speed is determined by the type of boat chosen, and how much damage it has sustained. The choices for boats include a dinghy, a raft, or a canoe. The dinghy is balanced, the raft handles well but is slow, and the canoe is fast but handles poorly. There are a few minigames, which involve guiding the boat away from rocks and whirlpools. After the minigame, if the boat has been damaged, the player can choose to repair the boat or build an entirely different one.

The player and partner will eventually reach Dawson City, where they are presented with a map of mining claims they can stake. There, they meet Nellie Cashman and author Jack London. Once they have staked a claim, they can begin searching for gold. With the arrival of winter, the game ends. The player's score is determined by the amount of money they have (from the entire journey, including gold). Most claims will yield small amounts of gold, but at least one claim can get you the high score.

One notable claim is Cheechako Hill, which is always available. Staking Cheechako Hill will always result in the player becoming rich. Historically, the initial wave of prospectors ignored Cheechako Hill because only a cheechako (newcomer) would think there was gold so high up the hillside, but it turned out to contain rich deposits.

== Reception ==
The Yukon Trail was used as a test product in schools for analysis of covariance research.
