= MECC =

Educational software organization

Minnesota Educational Computing Consortium
- MECC logo, early 1990s
- Industry: Educational software
- Founded: 1973
- Founder: Minnesota Legislature
- Defunct: October 1999
- Fate: Shut down by SoftKey
- Successor: SoftKey
- Headquarters: Brooklyn Center, Minnesota, U.S.
- Owner: State of Minnesota
- Website: mecc.com (archive)

The Minnesota Educational Computing Consortium (later Corporation), most commonly known as MECC, was an organization founded in 1973 for the purpose of advancing availability of computer software in education. MECC is best known for developing the edutainment video game series The Oregon Trail and its spin-offs. The initial goal of the organization was to coordinate and provide computer services to schools in the state of Minnesota, but its software eventually became popular in schools around the world. MECC had its headquarters in the Brookdale Corporate Center in Brooklyn Center, Minnesota. It was acquired by SoftKey in 1995 and was shut down in 1999.

== History ==
MECC logo c. 1978

=== Origins ===
During the 1960s, Minnesota was a center of computer technology, what City Pages would describe 50 years later as a "Midwestern Silicon Valley". IBM, Honeywell, Control Data and other companies had facilities in the state. In 1963, their presence inspired a group of teachers at the University of Minnesota College of Education's laboratory school to introduce computers into classrooms via teleprinters and time-sharing. The group began with long-distance calls to Dartmouth College's General Electric computer to use John George Kemeny and Thomas E. Kurtz's new Dartmouth BASIC language, then moved to Minneapolis-based Pillsbury Company's own GE computer. In 1968, twenty Minneapolis–Saint Paul area school districts and the College of Education founded Total Information for Educational Systems (TIES) to provide time-sharing service on a HP 2000, training, and software. The presence of computer-company employees on many school boards accelerated the expansion of TIES and helped make Minnesota a leader in computer-based education.

The success of TIES, and that of similar projects run by Minneapolis Public Schools and Minnesota State University, Mankato, led to the founding of MECC in 1973 by the state legislature. As a Joint Powers Authority, with the support of the University of Minnesota, the Minnesota State Colleges and Universities System, and the Minnesota Department of Education, MECC's role was to study and coordinate computer use in schools for both administrative and educational purposes. Schools, including the universities, had to get MECC's approval for most computing expenses, and were also its customers for computer-related services. After study of educational needs, a single educational computer center in the Minneapolis area was recommended for use by schools throughout the state (the University of Minnesota's MERITSS computer provided time-sharing services to its campuses and to state universities). MECC hoped that every Minnesota school, regardless of size, would have a terminal connected to the computer center.

=== Computing facilities ===
SUMITS, a UNIVAC 1110 mainframe was installed at the MECC facility at 1925 Sather (address later changed to 2520 Broadway Drive), next to Highway 280. A sturdy industrial building originally used for electrical maintenance, part of the building was already occupied by the University of Minnesota's Lauderdale computing facility. SUMITS was a batch processing system, albeit not a time-sharing system, and its performance failed to meet the terms of the contract. In 1977 it was replaced with a Control Data Corporation Cyber 73 mainframe, known as the MECC Timesharing System (MTS). It became the largest such system for education in the world, with up to 448 simultaneous connections from up to 2,000 terminals throughout the state, most of them Teletype Model 33 teleprinters, connected at 110 and 300 baud through telephones by using acoustically coupled modems. After several years most of the phone lines were replaced with direct circuits to schools across the state.

By 1982 MTS had more than 950 programs in its library. One of the most popular was The Oregon Trail, originally written for the Minneapolis Public Schools' computer. Programming was the largest single use for MTS, with up to 45% of the system used for one of almost one dozen computer languages. To support its larger number of users—70 to 80% of all Minnesota public schools in 1981, and available to 96% of Minnesota students from 7 am to 11 pm daily by 1982—primarily using programs written in the BASIC language, both timesharing systems developed shared memory (MULTI) BASIC systems. Through this – and less efficient methods – multiuser programs and chat systems appeared in addition to electronic mail and BBS programs; some of these were derived from MERITSS programs.

While some of the ideas may have been derived from MERITSS, the multi programs were more efficient. The MERITSS chat program, even though it operated via fast access system files, could not match the efficiency of a MULTI chat program that copied the input/output into memory to be delivered to the user.

The University of Minnesota Computer Center (UCC as it was called then) rejected implementing MULTI due to concerns about system stability. UCC tried to retrofit the MULTI-mail program for its own use because of the good user interface, but it was not possible. They then tried again with an older fast access system file version, and while it worked, it was unreliable. After doing test runs with several other universities' mail programs, two developers at UCC implemented their own version, which also contained a message board feature, and was the campus-wide e-mail solution for a couple of years.

=== Microcomputer technology ===
As MECC's Cyber 73 entered into service, microcomputers began to appear. In 1978 it appeared that features wished for in the classroom, such as a graphical display, were available. Through an evaluation and bidding process, the Apple II was chosen by MECC for state schools over other candidates, such as the Radio Shack TRS-80; the win was an important early deal in the history of Apple Inc. Any school in the state could buy Apple computers through MECC, which resold them at cost, without having to go through complex evaluation and purchasing procedures. Through what InfoWorld described as an "enviable showcase" for its products Apple sold more than 2,000 computers during the next three years and more than 5,000 by 1983, making MECC the company's largest reseller. In late 1981 MECC switched to a discount agreement for the Atari 8-bit computers, and distributed software through the Atari Program Exchange. The use of microcomputers quickly increased, with 85% of school districts using them by 1981 compared to 75% for time-sharing, and the Cyber 73 shut down in 1983. By then each Minnesota public school had an average of three to four computers, compared to only 20 Milwaukee elementary schools (out of 110) with computers. MECC offered computer training to teachers and administrators, and 10 consortium consultants traveled throughout the state assisting school districts.

MECC developed hundreds of microcomputer educational programs, many converted from the time-sharing original; by 1979 some MECC programs for the Apple II could be downloaded from the timesharing system. MECC distributed The Oregon Trail and other titles in its library to Minnesota schools for free, and charged others $10 to $20 for diskettes, each containing several programs. By July 1981 it had 29 software packages available. Projector slides, student worksheets, and other resources for teachers accompanied the software.

As control over computer resources moved to local levels within Minnesota, MECC's focus on selling software grew. Beginning in 1980 with the Iowa Department of Education, 5,000 school districts around the world purchased site licenses for MECC software. It distributed 250,000 copies of MECC software around the world by 1982, and the "Institutional Membership" business became so successful that state subsidies ended. In 1983 MECC became a taxable, profit-making company, owned by the state of Minnesota but otherwise independent. By the 1985–1986 school year MECC offered more than 300 products and had about $7 million in annual sales.

== Activities ==
During its lifetime, the company produced a number of programs that would become well known to Generation X and Millennial students across the U.S. Besides Oregon Trail, titles included The Secret Island of Dr. Quandary, The Yukon Trail, The Amazon Trail, Odell Lake, Zoyon Patrol, Number Munchers, Word Munchers, Fraction Munchers, Super Munchers, Lemonade Stand, Spellevator, Storybook Weaver, My Own Stories, Museum Madness, Jenny's Journeys, and DinoPark Tycoon. The game Freedom!, which had the player try to escape from slavery on the Underground Railroad, was released in 1992 but pulled from the market in 1993 following complaints from parents about its classroom use.

== Acquisition by SoftKey ==
MECC was financially successful and dominated the market for Apple II software used within schools, but its management believed that the company needed more capital in order to compete for the home market and to develop software for other platforms, such as the IBM PC and the Macintosh. As the state of Minnesota did not have the capital to fund such plans, it spun off the company as a private corporation in 1991 to the venture capital fund North American Fund II for $5.25 million. An IPO followed in March 1994. In October 1995, the publicly traded company, with about $30 million in annual revenue—about one third from The Oregon Trail—was acquired by SoftKey for $370 million in stock as part of a series of consolidations in the educational software market.

Although MECC continued to develop software after its acquisition, including the successful Oregon Trail II in 1995, Softkey (then named The Learning Company) was acquired by Mattel in 1999 in what Businessweek called one of "the Worst Deals of All Time", leading to the a great deal of financial repercussions that year, including the closure of the MECC offices in Brooklyn Center, Minnesota, in October 1999.
