= Index of Windows games (R) =

This is an index of Microsoft Windows games.

This list has been split into multiple pages. Please use the Table of Contents to browse it.

Title	Released	Developer	Publisher
R.U.S.E.	2010	Eugen Systems	Ubisoft
Race – The Official WTCC Game	2006	SimBin	Eidos Interactive, Valve
Race 07	2007	SimBin Studios	SimBin Studios
Race Driver: Grid	2008	Codemasters	Codemasters
Racer	2009	Ruud van Gaal	Ruud van Gaal
Radiation Island	2016	Atypical Games	Atypical Games
Raft	2022	Redbeet Interactive	Axolot games
Rag Doll Kung Fu	2005	Qi Studios	Valve, Merscom, Zoo Digital Publishing
Rage	2011	id Software	Electronic Arts
Rage 2	2019	Avalanche Studios, id Software	Bethesda Softworks
Rage of Mages	1998	Nival Interactive	Buka Entertainment, Monolith Productions
Ragnorium	2022	Vitali Kirpu	Devolver Digital
Raid: World War II	2017	Lion Game Lion	Starbreeze Studios
Raiden II	1997	Seibu Kaihatsu, Kinesoft	GAMEBANK, Cyberfront Corporation, Interplay Value Products Division
Raiden III	2006	Moss LTD, Seibu Kaihatsu	MOSS LTD, Cyberfront Corporation, Soft-World International
Rail Simulator	2007	Kuju Entertainment	Electronic Arts
Rails Across America	2001	Flying Lab Software	Strategy First
RalliSport Challenge	2002	Digital Illusions CE	Microsoft Game Studios
Rally Championship	2002	Warthog Games	SCi, Encore Software Inc.
Rally Championship Xtreme	2001	Warthog Games	SCi
Rally Trophy	2001	Bugbear Entertainment	JoWood Productions
Rama	1996	Sierra Entertainment	Sierra Entertainment
Rampage World Tour	1997	Midway Games	Midway Games
Ran Online	2004	Min Communications, Inc.	GameSamba
Ratatouille	2007	Heavy Iron Studios	THQ
Raven Squad: Operation Hidden Dagger	2009	Atomic Motion	Evolved Games
Ravenskull	2003	Superior Interactive	Superior Interactive
RayCrisis	2000	Taito	CyberFront, MediaKite, Sourcenext
RayForce	1997	Taito	Gamebank, Cyberfront Corporation, MediaKite
Rayman	1995	Ubisoft Montpellier	Ubisoft
Rayman 2: The Great Escape	1999	Ubisoft	Ubisoft
Rayman 3: Hoodlum Havoc	2003	Ubisoft	Ubisoft
Rayman M	2001	Ubisoft	Ubisoft
Rayman Brain Games	2000	Ubisoft	Ubisoft
Rayman Raving Rabbids	2006	Ubisoft Montpellier	Ubisoft
RC Cars	2002	Creat Studio	1C Company, Whiptail Interactive
Re-Mission	2006	Realtime Associates, Inc.	HopeLab
Re-Volt	1999	Probe Ltd, Acclaim Studios Croydon	Acclaim Entertainment, Throwback Entertainment
Reader Rabbit Kindergarten	1997	The Learning Company	The Learning Company
Reader Rabbit Playtime for Baby	1999	The Learning Company	The Learning Company
Reader Rabbit Preschool: Sparkle Star Rescue	2001	The Learning Company	The Learning Company
Reader Rabbit Toddler	1997	The Learning Company	The Learning Company
Reader Rabbit: 1st Grade	1998	The Learning Company	The Learning Company
Reader Rabbit's Interactive Reading Journey	1997	The Learning Company	The Learning Company
Reader Rabbit's Interactive Reading Journey 2	1997	The Learning Company	The Learning Company
Reader Rabbit's Reading 2	1997	The Learning Company	The Learning Company
Reading Blaster 2000	1996	Davidson & Associates	Davidson & Associates, Knowledge Adventure
Really? Really!	2006	Navel	Navel
The Realm Online	1996	Sierra On-Line, Codemasters, Norseman Games	Sierra On-Line
Realm of the Mad God	2011	Wild Shadow Studios	Wild Shadow Studios, Spry Fox
Realmz	1999	Fantasoft	Fantasoft
Reassembly	2015	Anisoptera Games	Arthur Danskin
Rebel Inc.	2019	Ndemic Creations	Ndemic Creations
Rebel Raiders: Operation Nighthawk	2006	Kando Games	XS Games
Rebel Trucker	2003	3 Romans	Global Star Software
Rec Room	2016	Against Gravity	Against Gravity
Recoil	1999	Zipper Interactive	Electronic Arts
ReCore	2016	Armature Studio, Comcept	Microsoft Studios
Red Ace Squadron	2001	Small Rockets	Small Rockets
Red Baron II	1997	Dynamix	Sierra Entertainment
Red Dead Redemption	2024	Rockstar San Diego	Rockstar Games
Red Dead Redemption 2	2019	Rockstar Studios	Rockstar Studios
Red Faction	2001	Volition	THQ
Red Faction II	2003	Volition	THQ
Red Faction: Guerrilla	2009	Volition	THQ
Red Ocean	2007	Collision Studios	Digital Entertainment Pool
Red Orchestra: Ostfront 41-45	2006	Tripwire Interactive	Bold Games
Redfall	2023	Arkane Studios	Bethesda Softworks
Redjack: Revenge of the Brethren	1998	Cyberflix	THQ
Redline	1999	Beyond Games	Accolade
Redline Racer	1998	Criterion Games	Ubisoft
The Regiment	2006	Kuju	Konami, Encore, Inc.
Remember 11: The Age of Infinity	2004	KID	KID, T-TIME Technology
Remember Me	2013	Dontnod Entertainment	Capcom
Remnant: From the Ashes	2019	Gunfire Games	Perfect World Entertainment
Remnant 2	2023	Gunfire Games	Arc Games
Remothered: Broken Porcelain	2020	Stormind Games	Modus Games
Remothered: Tormented Fathers	2018	Stormind Games	Darril Arts
Ren'ai CHU!	2001	Saga Planets	Saga Planets
Renfield: Bring Your Own Blood	2023	Mega Cat Studios	Skybound Games
Republic: The Revolution	2003	Elixir Studios	Eidos Interactive
Requiem: Avenging Angel	1999	Cyclone Studios	3DO, Ubisoft
Reservoir	2006	Volatile Games	Eidos Interactive, Lionsgate
Reset Generation	2008	RedLynx	Nokia
Resident Evil 4	2005	Capcom Production Studio 4	Capcom
Resident Evil Survivor	2000	Capcom Production Studio 2	Capcom
Restaurant Empire	2003	Enlight	Enlight
Return Fire	1996	Silent Software, Inc.	Prolific Publishing
Return Fire 2	1998	Silent Software, Inc.	Ripcord Games
Return of the Obra Dinn	2018	Lucas Pope	3909 LLC.
Return to Castle Wolfenstein	2001	Gray Matter Studios	Activision
Return to Krondor	1998	PyroTechnix	Sierra Studios
Returnal	2023	Housemarque	Sony Interactive Entertainment
Revelations: Persona	1996	Atlus	Atlus
Revenant	1999	Cinematix Studios	Eidos Interactive
Reynatis	2024	Natsume Atari, FuRyu	FuRyu, NIS America
RF Online	2006	CCR International	CCR International, Level Up Games
rFactor	2005	Image Space Incorporated	Image Space Incorporated
RHEM	2003	Knut Muller	Got Game Entertainment, Micro Application
RHEM 2: The Cave	2005	Knut Muller	Got Game Entertainment, Virtual Programming
Rhiannon: Curse of the Four Branches	2008	Arberth Studios	Lighthouse Interactive
Rhythm Doctor	2025	7 Beat Games	7 Beat Games, Indienova
Riana Rouge	1997	Black Dragon Productions	Black Dragon Productions
Richard Burns Rally	2004	Warthog Games	SCi, Gizmondo Games
Ricochet	2005	Superior Interactive	Superior Interactive
Ricochet Infinity	2007	Reflexive Entertainment	Reflexive Entertainment
Ricochet Lost Worlds	2004	Reflexive Entertainment	Reflexive Entertainment
Ricochet Lost Worlds: Recharged	2004	Reflexive Entertainment	Reflexive Entertainment
Ride to Hell: Retribution	2013	Eutechnyx	Deep Silver
Rime	2017	Tequila Works	Grey Box, Six Foot
Ring	1998	Arxel Tribe	Cryo Interactive
Rise and Fall: Civilizations at War	2006	Stainless Steel Studios	Midway Games
Rise of Flight: The First Great Air War	2009	neoqb	777 Studios, Aerosoft, ND Games, Direct2Drive
Rise of Industry	2019	Dapper Penguin Studios	Kasedo Games
Rise of Nations	2003	Big Huge Games	Microsoft Game Studios
Rise of Nations: Rise of Legends	2006	Big Huge Games	Microsoft Game Studios
Rise of the Argonauts	2008	Liquid Entertainment	Codemasters
Rise of the Rōnin	2025	Team Ninja	Koei Tecmo
Rise of the Tomb Raider	2016	Crystal Dynamics	Microsoft Studios, Square Enix
Rise: The Vieneo Province	2006	Unistellar Industries, LLC	Unistellar Industries, LLC
Risen	2009	Piranha Bytes	Deep Silver
Risen 2: Dark Waters	2012	Piranha Bytes	Deep Silver
Risen 3: Titan Lords	2014	Piranha Bytes	Deep Silver
Rising Lands	1997	Microids	R&P Electronic Media
Risk II	2000	Deep Red Games	Hasbro Interactive
Riven	1997	Cyan	Broderbund
Road 96	2021	DigixArt	DigixArt, Plug In Digital
Road Rash	1996	Electronic Arts	Electronic Arts
Robin Hood's Quest	2007	Oxygen Interactive	Oxygen Interactive
Robin Hood: Defender of the Crown	2003	Cinemaware	ZOO Digital Group, Capcom
Robin Hood: The Legend of Sherwood	2002	Spellbound Entertainment	Mindscape
RoboBlitz	2006	Naked Sky Entertainment	Valve
RoboCop	2003	Titus Interactive	Titus Interactive, Euro Services Internet, MGM Interactive
Robot Battle	2002	Brad Schick	GarageGames
Robot City	1995	Brooklyn Multimedia	Byron Preiss Multimedia
Robot Wars: Arenas of Destruction	2001	Climax Entertainment	BBC Multimedia
Robots	2005	Eurocom	Vivendi Universal Games
Rock Manager	2001	PAN Vision	DreamCatcher Interactive
Rocket Arena	2020	Final Strike Games, Nimble Giant Entertainment	Electronic Arts
Rocket Jockey	1996	Rocket Science Games	SegaSoft
Rocket League	2015	Psyonix	Psyonix
Rocket Mania!	2003	Nuclide Games	PopCap Games
RocketBowl	2004	LargeAnimal	GarageGames
Rockett's New School	1997	Purple Moon	Purple Moon
Rocks'n'Diamonds	1995	Artsoft Entertainment	Artsoft Entertainment
Rogue Legacy	2013	Cellar Door Games	Cellar Door Games
Rogue Trooper	2006	Rebellion Developments	Eidos Interactive
Rogue Warrior	2009	Zombie Studios, Rebellion Developments	Bethesda Softworks
Rohan: Blood Feud	2008	YNK Korea	YNK Interactive
Rollcage	1999	Attention to Detail	Psygnosis
Rollcage Stage II	2000	Attention to Detail	Take-Two Interactive
RollerCoaster Tycoon	1999	Chris Sawyer	Hasbro Interactive
RollerCoaster Tycoon 2	2002	Chris Sawyer	Infogrames
RollerCoaster Tycoon 3	2004	Frontier Developments	Atari
Roma Victor	2006	RedBedlam	RedBedlam
Romance of the Three Kingdoms VII	2000	Koei	Koei
Romance of the Three Kingdoms VIII	2001	Koei	Koei
Romance of the Three Kingdoms IX	2003	Koei	Koei
Romance of the Three Kingdoms X	2004	Koei	Koei
Romance of the Three Kingdoms XI	2006	Koei	Koei
Romancing SaGa 2	2017	Square	Square
Rome: Total Realism	2005	Rome: Total Realism Team	Rome: Total Realism Team
Rome: Total War	2004	The Creative Assembly	Activision, Sega
Rome: Total War: Alexander	2006	The Creative Assembly	Activision, Sega
Rome: Total War: Barbarian Invasion	2005	The Creative Assembly	Activision, Sega
Roogoo	2008	SpiderMonk Entertainment	SouthPeak Games
Root After and Another	2007	Makura	Makura
Rowan's Battle of Britain	2000	Rowan Software	Empire Interactive
RPG Maker 2000	2000	Enterbrain	ASCII
RPG Maker 2003	2002	Enterbrain	ASCII
RPG Maker 95	1997	ASCII	ASCII, Enterbrain
RPG Maker VX	2007	Enterbrain	Enterbrain
RPM Tuning	2004	Babylon Software	Wanadoo Edition
Racing Simulation 3	2003	Ubisoft	Ubisoft
Rubies of Eventide	2003	Mnemosyne	Mnemosyne
Rubik's Games	1999	Androsoft	Hasbro Interactive
Rugby 06	2006	EA Canada, HB Studios	EA Sports
Rugby 08	2007	HB Studios	Electronic Arts
Rugby 2004	2003	HB Studios	EA Sports
Rugby 2005	2005	EA Canada	Electronic Arts
Rugrats in Paris: The Movie	2000	KnowWonder	THQ
Rune	2000	Human Head Studios	Gathering of Developers
Runner3	2018	Choice Provisions	Choice Provisions
Rush for Berlin	2006	StormRegion	Deep Silver
Rusted Moss	2023	faxdoc, happysquared, sunnydaze	Playism
Ryse: Son of Rome	2014	Crytek	Crytek
Ryzom	2004	Nevrax	Nevrax
