= Reader Rabbit 2 =

1991 educational video game

- Cover art for Reader Rabbit 2 Deluxe!
- Developer: The Learning Company
- Publisher: The Learning Company
- Platforms: Original; MS-DOS; Deluxe; Windows 3.x, Classic Mac OS; Reading 2 Windows, Mac
- Release: August 1991; 1994 (Deluxe); 1997 (Reading 2)
- Genre: Educational video game
- Mode: Single-player

Reader Rabbit 2 is a 1991 educational video game, the sequel to Reader Rabbit and the fourth game in the Reader Rabbit franchise. A facelift was given to the game's predecessor to match the graphical fidelity of Reader Rabbit 2.

== Gameplay ==
The game can be played with the keyboard or a mouse. Set in a location called Wordsville, the game contained four word-based minigames. Players are taught about vowel sounds and how to construct sentences.

== Reception ==
Reception

Review score
Publication	Score
AllGame	4.5/5 stars

Awards
Publication	Award
Software Publishers Association	Best Elementary Education Product
Technology & Learning	Award of Excellence
Parents' Choice	Parents' Choice Award

Heidi E.H. Aycock of Compute! praised the game for demonstrating how educational games could be as visually and aurally stunning as other genres of video gaming. Game Players PC Entertainment reviewed the game as a solid choice for young players at school and home.
