= Reader Rabbit =

Video game series

- Genre: Educational
- Developer: The Learning Company
- Publishers: The Learning Company (1984–1995); The Learning Company (1995–1999); Mattel Interactive under The Learning Company label (1999–2000); The Gores Group under The Learning Company label (2000–2001); Riverdeep/Houghton Mifflin Harcourt under The Learning Company label (2001–2018); Encore Software (2005–present); Graffiti Entertainment (2009–2011); Houghton Mifflin Harcourt (2018–present)
- Creator: Leslie Grimm
- Platforms: Apple II, Atari 8-bit, Commodore 64, MS-DOS, Mac, Windows, Nintendo DS, Wii, Mobile
- First release: Reader Rabbit and the Fabulous Word Factory; 1984
- Latest release: Reader Rabbit: Jumpsmarter; 2018

Reader Rabbit is an American educational video game franchise created in 1984 by The Learning Company. The series is aimed at children from infancy to the age of nine. In 1998, a spiritual successor series called The ClueFinders was released for older students aged seven to twelve.

The games teach language arts including basic skills in reading and spelling and mathematics. The main character in all the titles is named "Reader Rabbit".

== History ==
Reader Rabbit media release years
1984	Reader Rabbit
1985
1986	Math Rabbit
1987	Writer Rabbit
1988–1990
1991	Reader Rabbit 2
1992	Ready for Letters
1993	Reader Rabbit 3
1994	Interactive Reading Journey
1995	Reading Development Library 1
1995	Reading Development Library 2
1995	Preschool / Let's Start Learning!
1996	Reading Development Library 3
1996	Reading Development Library 4
1996	Interactive Math Journey
1996	Interactive Reading Journey 2
1997	Toddler
1997	Kindergarten
1998	1st Grade
1998	2nd Grade
1998	Math Ages 6–9
1999	Learn to Read
1999	Playtime for Baby
1999	Thinking Adventures Ages 4–6
2000	Learning Creations
2001	Sparkle Star Rescue
2001	Bounce Down in Balloon Town!
2001	Capers on Cloud Nine!
2001	Mis-Cheese-ious Dreamship Adventures!
2002	Dreamship Tales
2002	Learn to Read with Phonics 1st & 2nd Grade
2003–2010
2011	On a Mission to Help the Lion Flowers
2012
2013	Kart Racing
2013	Smart & Jump
2014–2015
2016	Math Race
2017
2018	Jumpsmarter

The first Reader Rabbit computer game was conceived by the Grimm sisters and titled Reader Rabbit and the Fabulous Word Factory. It was released initially in 1984 and featured in the 1983 holiday special The Computer Chronicles. In 1986, both Reader Rabbit 2.0 and Math Rabbit were released. In 1987, Writer Rabbit was released with the intention of having a Rabbit series that featured different academic subjects. Ultimately, the developers decided to have a Reader Rabbit series that explored subjects beyond reading. With this directional change, Math Rabbit would later be renamed Reader Rabbit with the game title Reader Rabbit's Math. Many critics and gaming historians erroneously assert that the Reader Rabbit series officially began in 1986. The 1990s saw an audio cassette release of some of the game's most popular music, titled Reader Rabbit's Sing Along Favorites, and by 1996 the Reader Rabbit series included a wide variety of titles, including Reader Rabbit's Reading Development Library which allowed players to experience fairy tales via animated storybooks.

In 1995, The Learning Company was bought by SoftKey after a hostile takeover bid. Softkey adopted the name The Learning Company. Softkey embarked on a cost-cutting exercise with the aim to sell cheaper software. The Platinum line of budget titles pushed the retail price for edutainment down to $12.99 in the US, and swapped the fancy packaging for a simple jewel case. At the time, SoftKey founder Kevin O'Leary recalled, "I'd get a $12 million order for Reader Rabbit...it would blow up behind me, the logistics. I couldn't deliver", noting that he gave Mike Perik half his equity to solve the problem. In 1998, The Learning Company was acquired by Mattel in a $3.6 billion deal. The toy-maker was looking to enter the interactive market. Mattel planned to expand the Reader Rabbit franchise into a series of interactive electronic plush toys that could download new content from the Internet. Mattel was forced to quickly sell off their properties the following year to avoid bankruptcy, and the Reader Rabbit brand was sold to Riverdeep. From 1998 to 2002, a series called The ClueFinders featuring a Scooby-Doo-like gang of mystery solvers was released with similar subject matter aimed at a more advanced student base, from the third to the sixth grade. The Reader Rabbit Workbook Series was released in 2003, and consisted of three 320-page comprehensive workbooks and five 32-page single-subject workbooks, aimed at children ages three to seven.

The early 2000s saw the last major PC releases of the franchise. New games have since been released on platforms such as Nintendo Wii, while some parts of older games have been uploaded to the Internet Archive. By 2003, the Reader Rabbit series had been sold in over 40 countries and translated into 13 different languages:

- Chinese (titled 瑞德小兔 / Reid Bunny)
- Danish (titled Fætter Kanin)
- Dutch (titled Robbie Konijn)
- Finnish (titled Jussi Jänö)
- French (titled Lapin Malin), first translation in 1998
- German (titled Billi Banni)
- Japanese (titled リーダーラビット / Reader Rabbit)
- Norwegian (titled Labbe Langøre)
- Polish (titled Królik Bystrzak)
- Portuguese (titled Coelho Sabido; ClueFinders titled Os Caça-Pistas)
- Russian (titled Школа Кролика / Rabbit's School)
- Spanish (titled El Conejo Lector, first translation in 1998)
- Swedish (titled Kalle Kunskap)

There is a Reader Rabbit themed attraction at Parken Zoo in Eskilstuna, Sweden, which replaced the longstanding and successful Phantom Land. Various audio-books have been released by Prelusion Games and Nordic Softsales, including titles such as Kalle Kunskap i Vilda Västern (Reader Rabbit in the Wild West) in 2010. Mindscape, the international division of The Learning Company following acquisitions in 2002, released a few games for the French market, including Lapin Malin: Initiation à l'anglais (Reader Rabbit: Introduction to English), a game designed to teach children the English language. The Brazilian Reader Rabbit, Coelho Sabido, is a trademark of Divertire Editora, a company active in the educational games market since 1998.

In March 2004, LeapFrog and Riverdeep entered into a publishing and distribution agreement for Reader Rabbit. They planned a series of five e-books about phonics that would be released for the LeapPad learning system, but only three e-books were released by fall of that year. Some Reader Rabbit games were re-released for Nintendo Wii console in 2011. As of 2017, Houghton Mifflin Harcourt, the successor to Riverdeep after acquisitions and mergers, was offering the products through various distribution networks on their website. In 2021, HarperCollins Publishers, a subsidiary of News Corp, purchased Houghton Mifflin Harcourt's books and media division, including all the rights to their video game intellectual properties.

== Design ==
=== Plot and gameplay ===
The series centers on the adventures of Reader Rabbit and his friends, including Sam the Lion and Matilda the Mouse.

Generally, the series consists of point-and-click adventure games where the player must use their inventory and interact with characters to solve a series of puzzles. These puzzles were originally reading-based challenges but different titles focus on other subject areas, such as math and spelling. Visually, the games consists of a series of static screens which the player can navigate through by clicking on certain "travel" hot spots. Other hot spots can trigger an interaction with a character, item, song, or mini-game.

=== Art ===
In the early 1990s, artist Shaowei Liu hand painted backgrounds and animations which were then digitized for the games. In the mid-1990s, artist Frank Cirocco drew the characters and foregrounds in pencil, hiring Mick Gray to ink the line art. By 1997, the characters were redesigned for Reader Rabbit Toddler by Tracy Reynolds of Class 6 Entertainment. For some of the games at this time, the art was provided by Chester Aldridge's company US Equity Holdings. For the later games, Fred Dianda was made Lead Artist. Some line art was worked on by Gerald Broas, who used a 2B pencil to hand draw the backgrounds and characters on 12 field animation paper. For the story books included in the interactive journey and library games, artist Marc Diamond used a LeapPad tablet to sketch the pictures before coloring and shading. The most recent art for the iOS games was done by concept artist Federico Miniaci.

=== Music ===
Each game contains songs that guide the narrative and provide the internal monologs of characters. Composer Scott Lloyd Shelly was particularly proud of composing the music for Reader Rabbit: 1st Grade in 1998. Foreign language versions were created for many of the games to give the franchise global appeal. This extended to the games' songs; one song from Reader Rabbit Preschool was translated into French, German, Portuguese, Russian, and Swedish. A VHS video called Reader Rabbit Sing-A-Song Adventures was released in 2000, featuring a compilation of the series' best songs.

=== Educational goals ===
Education has always been a key part of the games' design, seeking to find a balance between learning and fun. The titles in the series are researched by educators, parents, children and reading specialists to ensure the software is educational, engaging and easy to use. The software aimed to promote the use of computers as teaching tools in the classroom. The games covered a range of subjects such as reading, phonics, math, and memory. The A.D.A.P.T. Learning Technology was introduced into Reader Rabbit titles in 1999. The system contained a series of customization features that would facilitate the player's learning by assessing abilities, developing skills, adjusting levels, providing help, and tracking progress.

== Products in the franchise ==
=== Video games ===
Games	Platforms, release years and versions
Reader Rabbit and the Fabulous Word Factory (aka Reader Rabbit)	Apple II (1984 – V1.0); Atari 8-bit (1984 – V1.0); Apple II (1984 – V1.1); Commodore 64 (1984 – V1.2); Apple II (1984 – V1.3); Re-released as Reader Rabbit; Apple IIc (1986 – V1.4); Apple IIGS (1987 – V2.0); MS-DOS (1987 – V2.1); Mac (1987 – V2.2); MS-DOS (1987 – V3.0); MS-DOS (1989 – V4.1); Re-released as Talking Reader Rabbit; Apple IIGS (1990 – V2.3); Re-released as Reader Rabbit 1; MS-DOS (1991 – V5.1); Re-released as Reader Rabbit 1 Deluxe; Mac OS 6, Windows (1994 – V1.0); Windows 3.x (1996 – V1.2); Remade as Reader Rabbit's Reading 1; Windows and Macintosh (1997 – 2.0); Macintosh, Windows (1997 – V2.03)
Math Rabbit	Apple II (1986 – V1.0); MS-DOS (1986 – V1.0); MS-DOS (1986 – V1.1); Apple II (1986 – V1.2); MS-DOS (1993 – V2.0); Re-released as Math Rabbit Deluxe; Mac, Windows (1994 – V1.0); Windows 3.x (1996 – V2.0); Mac OS 7 (1996 – V2.2); Re-released as Reader Rabbit's Math 1; Mac, Windows (1997 – V2.02); Re-released as Reader Rabbit Math Ages 4–6; Mac, Windows (1998 – V3.0); Re-released as Reader Rabbit Personalized Math Ages 4–6; Mac OS 7, Windows (1999 – V4.0)
Writer Rabbit	1986 (V1.0); 1986 (V1.2); MS-DOS (1986 – V1.3); Apple (1987 – V1.4); Remade as Reader Rabbit 3; MS-DOS (1993 – V1.0); Re-released as Reader Rabbit 3 Deluxe!; Mac OS 7 (1995 – V1.0); Mac OS 7 (1996 – V1.01); Windows 3.x (1996 – V1.10); Windows (1997 – V1.11)
Reader Rabbit 2	MS-DOS (1991 – V1.01); Re-released as Reader Rabbit 2 Deluxe!; Windows 3.x (1996 – V1.1); Mac OS 6 (1996 – V1.0/1); Remade as Reader Rabbit's Reading 2; Mac, Windows (1997 – V2.0); Mac, Windows (1997 – V2.03)
Reader Rabbit's Ready for Letters	MS-DOS (1992 – V1.0); Mac OS 6 (1993 – V1.0); MS-DOS (1993 – V1.1); MS-DOS, Windows 3.x (1994 – V2.0)
Reader Rabbit's Interactive Reading Journey (aka Reader Rabbit's Interactive Reading Journey 1)	Mac OS 7, Windows 3.x (1994 – V1.0); Mac OS 7, Windows 3.x (1994 – V1.01); Mac OS 7, Windows (1996 – V2.01); Re-released as Reader Rabbit's Interactive Reading Journey For Grades K-1; Mac (1997 – V2.02); Windows (1997 – V2.03); Re-released as Reader Rabbit Reading Ages 4–6; Mac, Windows (1998 – V1.0); Re-released as Reader Rabbit Personalized Reading Ages 4–6; Mac, Windows (1999 – V3.0)
Reader Rabbit's Reading Development Library 1	Mac OS 7, Windows 3.x (1995 – V1.0); Mac OS 7, Windows (1997 – V1.11)
Reader Rabbit's Reading Development Library 2	Mac OS 7, Windows 3.x (1995 – V1.0); Mac OS 7, Windows (1997 – V1.11)
Reader Rabbit and Friends: Let's Start Learning!	Mac OS 7, Windows (1995 – V1.0); Re-released as Reader Rabbit Preschool (titled Reader Rabbit's Nursery in UK); Mac, Windows (1997 – V1.0A); Mac, Windows (1997 – V1.02); Mac, Windows (1997 – V1.1); Mac, Windows (1998 – V2.0A); Re-released as Reader Rabbit Personalized Preschool; Mac, Windows (1999 – V3.0A); Mac, Windows (2000 – V4.0)
Reader Rabbit's Reading Development Library 3	Mac OS 7, Windows 3.x (1996 – V1.0); Mac OS 7, Windows (1997 – V1.11)
Reader Rabbit's Reading Development Library 4	Mac OS 7, Windows 3.x (1996); Mac OS 7, Windows (1997 – V1.0)
Interactive Math Journey	Mac, Windows (1996 – V1.02); Re-released as Reader Rabbit Presents: Math Journey for Grades 1–3; Mac, Windows (1997 – V1.12)
Reader Rabbit's Interactive Reading Journey 2	Mac OS 7, Windows (1996 – V1.0); Re-released as Reader Rabbit's Interactive Reading Journey For Grades 1–2; Mac, Windows (1997 – V1.02); Re-released as Reader Rabbit's Reading Ages 6–9; Mac, Windows (1998 – V1.1); Re-released as Reader Rabbit Personalized Reading Ages 6–9; Mac, Windows (1999 – V2.1)
Reader Rabbit Toddler	Mac OS 7, Windows (1997 – V1.02); Mac OS 7, Windows (1998 – V2.0); Mac OS 7, Windows (1999 – V3.0)
Reader Rabbit Kindergarten (titled Reader Rabbit's Junior in UK)	Mac OS 7, Windows (1997 – V1.0); Mac OS 7, Windows (1998 – V2.0); Re-released as Reader Rabbit Personalized Kindergarten; Mac OS 7, Windows (1999 – V3.0); Mac, Windows (2000 – V4.0)
Reader Rabbit: 1st Grade (titled Reader Rabbit's Key Stage 1 Year 1 in UK)	Windows (1998 – V1.0); Windows (1998 – V1.01); Mac (1998 – V1.01); Re-released as Reader Rabbit Personalized 1st Grade; Mac, Windows (1999 – V2.0); Mac, Windows (2000 – V3.0)
Reader Rabbit: 2nd Grade (titled Reader Rabbit's Key Stage 1 Year 2 in UK)	Mac OS 7, Windows 3.x (1998 – V1.0); Mac OS 7, Windows 3.x (1998 – V1.01); Mac OS 7, Windows 3.x (1998 – V1.1); Re-released as Reader Rabbit Personalized 2nd Grade; Mac, Windows (1999 – V2.0); Mac, Windows (2000 – V3.0)
Reader Rabbit Math Ages 6–9	Mac OS 7, Windows (1998 – V1.0); Re-released as Reader Rabbit Personalized Math Ages 6–9; Mac, Windows (1999 – V2.0)
Reader Rabbit's Learn to Read	Mac, Windows (1999 – V1.0)
Reader Rabbit Playtime for Baby	Mac, Windows (1999 – V1.0)
Reader Rabbit Thinking Adventures Ages 4–6	Mac, Windows (1999 – V1.0)
Reader Rabbit Learning Creations	Mac, Windows (2000 – V1.0, included with other Reader Rabbit titles on-disc); Mac OS 8.5, Windows (2001 – V2.0, included with other Reader Rabbit titles on-disc)
Reader Rabbit Preschool: Sparkle Star Rescue (titled Reader Rabbit Nursery: Sparkle Star Rescue in UK)	Mac OS 8.5, Windows (2001 – V1.0); Mac OS 8.5, Windows (2002 – V1.1); Nintendo Wii (2011); Nintendo DS (cancelled); iOS (2014)
Reader Rabbit Kindergarten: Bounce Down in Balloon Town! (titled Reader Rabbit Junior: Bounce Down in Balloon Town! in UK)	Mac OS 8.5, Windows (2001 – V1.0); Mac OS 8.5, Windows (2002 – V1.1); Nintendo DS (2009); Wii (2011); iOS (2014)
Reader Rabbit 1st Grade: Capers on Cloud Nine! (titled Reader Rabbit Year 1: Capers on Cloud Nine! in UK)	Mac OS 8.5, Windows (2001 – V1.0); Mac OS 8.5, Windows (2002 – V1.1); Wii (2011); Nintendo DS (cancelled); iOS (2014)
Reader Rabbit 2nd Grade: Mis-Cheese-ious Dreamship Adventures! (titled Reader Rabbit Year 2: Mis-Cheese-ious Dreamship Adventures! in UK)	Mac OS 8.5, Windows (2001 – V1.0); Mac OS 8.5, Windows (2002 – V1.1); Wii (2011); Nintendo DS (cancelled); iOS (2014)
Reader Rabbit Dreamship Tales	Mac OS 8.5, Windows (2002 – V1.0, included as a bonus disc with other Reader Rabbit titles)
Reader Rabbit Learn to Read with Phonics 1st & 2nd Grade	Mac OS 8.5, Windows (2002 – V1.0)
Reader Rabbit: on a Mission to Help the Lion Flowers	Nintendo DS (2011)
Reader Rabbit Kart Racing	iOS (2013)
Reader Rabbit Smart & Jump	iOS (2013)
Reader Rabbit Math Race	Android, iOS (2016)
Reader Rabbit: Jumpsmarter	iOS, Apple TV, MacOS (2018)

==== Compilations ====
Year	Title	Games
1999	Reader Rabbit Math & Reading Ages 4–6	Reader Rabbit Math Ages 4–6; Reader Rabbit Reading Ages 4–6
1999	Reader Rabbit's Complete Learn to Read System	Compilation of two Reader Rabbit titles plus parent's guides, flash cards, workbooks, and storybooks.; Disc one – Reader Rabbit's Learn to Read (1999); Disc two – Reader Rabbit's Reading Development Library 2 (1995)
2000	Reader Rabbit Playtime for Baby and Toddler	Reader Rabbit Toddler (1997); Reader Rabbit Playtime for Baby (1999)
2000	Reader Rabbit: I Can Read! With Phonics	Reader Rabbit's Reading 2 (1997); Reader Rabbit's Reading Ages 6–9 (1999)
2000	Reader Rabbit: Learn to Read with Phonics	Reader Rabbit's Reading 1 (1997); Reader Rabbit's Learn to Read (1999)
2003	Reader Rabbit KS1 – 5 Pack	Reader Rabbit Year 1: Capers on Cloud Nine! (2001); Reader Rabbit Year 2: Mis-cheese-ious Dreamship Adventures! (2001); Reader Rabbit's Math Ages 6–9 (1998); Reader Rabbit's Reading Ages 6–9 (1998); Reader Rabbit Thinking Adventures Ages 4–6 (1999)

=== Cassettes and DVD ===
- Reader Rabbit's Sing Along Favorites (music cassette)
- Reader Rabbit: Sing-A-Song Adventures (VHS – 2000)
- Reader Rabbit: Wordville Soup (DVD – 2005)
- Reader Rabbit: The Great Alphabet Race (DVD – 2005)

=== Reader Rabbit Giant Workbooks ===
These workbooks were published by The Learning Company and each were supplementary material to a corresponding game. They were republished as Reader Rabbit: Let's Learn by Houghton Mifflin Harcourt:

- Reader Rabbit Kindergarten
- Reader Rabbit Kindergarten: Rhyming Words
- Reader Rabbit Preschool
- Reader Rabbit Preschool: Reading Readiness
- Reader Rabbit Preschool: Colors & Shapes
- Reader Rabbit Preschool: Sounds
- Reader Rabbit Preschool: Alphabet
- Reader Rabbit Starting School Level 1: ABC
- Reader Rabbit 1st Grade
- Reader Rabbit 1st Grade: Spelling
- Reader Rabbit 1st Grade: Phonics
- Reader Rabbit 1st Grade: Writing Mechanics
- Reader Rabbit K-1st Grade: Math
- Reader Rabbit K-1st Grade: Math – Money, Time & Measurement

=== Reader Rabbit Leapfrog e-books ===
These e-books are about phonics and were released under the LeapPad learning system:

- The Great Word Chase
- High Flying Act
- Sam's Sweet Surprise

== Reception ==
=== Critical reception ===
In 1991, The Chicago Sun-Times noted that Reader Rabbit was "one of the most effective edutainment gaming franchises" and that it had helped many children learn how to read. Computer Shopper appreciated that the games filled a gap in the market; it found that while most reading comprehension titles were aimed at older children, Reader Rabbit uniquely offered games to the preschool age.

In 1995, The New York Times noted that the flagship title of The Learning Company was "unusual in crossing over from home use to in-school, curriculum-based learning". The newspaper noted in 2002 that the series had become an "educational staple in schools and homes" with a long tradition of "quality educational software". The Boston Herald argued that the games' replayability and enjoyment made their costs immediately justifiable. Krystina Madej of Physical Play and Children's Digital Games highlighted the series as an innovator in the budding edutainment genre during the 1980s, following in MECC's The Oregon Trail footsteps to create play-based educational games aimed at young children.

In 2012, PC Mag listed the debut title as one of the 10 Educational PC Games of the 1980s and noted that new titles were still being released.

=== Sales ===
The premiere game in the series, Reader Rabbit and the Fabulous Word Factory, first entered the Billboard Charts for Education Computer Software at number six in May 1985 and re-entered at number 10 two weeks later. The game continued to feature on the charts in following weeks, selling 250,000 units by 1989.

The series was commercially successful throughout its run. By 1991, the series had sold 500,000 copies. The Learning Company had a gross revenue of $27.5 million at the end of the 1993 financial year and 41% revenue growth from 1992–3, largely due to the Reader Rabbit series.

Between 1993 and 2001, the series sold six million copies. Around 2001, prices of the products were tapering and the sales were declining around Europe. By 2002, the series had sold over 25 million copies.

=== Awards and nominations ===
As of 2017, the series has won over 175 awards.

Year	Nominee / work	Award	Result
1991	Reader Rabbit 1	Technology & Learning Magazine's Language Arts Program of the Decade	Won
1991	Reader Rabbit 2	Parents' Choice Foundation Award	Won
1992	Reader Rabbit 2	Software Publishers Association's Award for Best Elementary Education Product	Won
1992	Reader Rabbit 2	CODiE Award for Best Elementary Education Program	Won
1992	Reader Rabbit 2	Technology & Learning Magazine's Award of Excellence	Won
1994	Reader Rabbit 1	The National Association of Parenting Publications Awards Gold Medal	Won
1994	Reader Rabbit 2	Technology & Learning Magazine's Software Award for Excellence—Next in Series	Won
1995	Reader Rabbit's Interactive Reading Journey 1	Home PC's Award of Excellence	Won
1995	Reader Rabbit's Interactive Reading Journey 1	Parenting Magazine's Software Magic Award	Won
1995	Reader Rabbit's Interactive Reading Journey 1	The Parent Council's Seal for outstanding product	Won
1995	Reader Rabbit's Interactive Reading Journey 1	Technology & Learning Magazine's Award of Excellence for the School category	Won
1995	Reader Rabbit's Interactive Reading Journey 1	The Parents' Choice Foundation Approval	Won
1995	Reader Rabbit's Interactive Reading Journey 1	Mac Home Journal's Reader's Choice Award	Won
1995	Reader Rabbit's Interactive Reading Journey 1	CD-ROM Today Magazine's Best Children's Program-Reading Award	Won
1995	Reader Rabbit's Interactive Reading Journey 1	Home Computing & Entertainment Magazine's Best Educational Program Award	Won
1995	Reader Rabbit 1	Newsweek Magazine's Editors' Choice Award	Won
1995	Reader Rabbit 2	Only the Best: The Annual Guide to the Highest-Rated Educational Software/Multimedia, 1994/95	Won
1995	Reader Rabbit 3	Only the Best: The Annual Guide to the Highest-Rated Educational Software/Multimedia, 1994/95	Won
1996	Reader Rabbit's Interactive Reading Journey 2	SuperKids Software Award for Best Reading Software	Won
1996	Reader Rabbit's Interactive Math Journey	Curriculum Administrator Magazine's Top 100 Districts' Choice Award	Won
1996	Reader Rabbit Reading 1	Parents' Choice Foundation Best Software of the Year	Won
1996	Reader Rabbit Reading 1	Language Art's Technology & Learning Magazine Program of the Decade	Won
1997	Reader Rabbit's Interactive Reading Journey 2	The National Educational Media Network Silver Apple	Won
1997	Reader Rabbit's Interactive Reading Journey 2	Newsweek Editor's Choice Award	Won
1997	Reader Rabbit's Interactive Reading Journey 2	Parent's Choice Gold Award	Won
1997	Reader Rabbit's Interactive Math Journey	Home PC's Editor's Choice Top 100 Software Award	Won
1997	Reader Rabbit's Interactive Math Journey	Bologna New Media Prize for Best Math Title (cosponsored by Children's Software Revue)	Won
1997	Reader Rabbit's Interactive Math Journey	Family PC's Recommended Software Seal	Won
1998	Reader Rabbit's 1st Grade	Parents' Choice Foundation Award	Gold Award
1998	Reader Rabbit's First Grade	Interactive Achievement Award for Computer Edutainment Game of the Year	Nominated
1998	Reader Rabbit's 2nd Grade	Parents' Choice Foundation Award	Silver Honor
1998	Reader Rabbit – 2nd Grade	Newsweek Magazine Editor's Choice Award	Won
1998	Reader Rabbit's Math Ages 6–9	Parents' Choice Foundation Award	Gold Award
2001	Reader Rabbit 1st Grade: Capers on Cloud Nine!	Parents' Choice Foundation Award	Approved
2001	Reader Rabbit 2nd Grade: Mis-cheese-ious Dreamship Adventures!	Parents' Choice Foundation Award	Approved
2001	Reader Rabbit Kindergarten: Bounce Down in Balloon Town!	Parents' Choice Foundation Award	Approved
2005	Reader Rabbit series – "Sam's Sweet Surprise", "High Flying Circus", "Great Word Chase" – for LeapPadBrad (Fuller, Don Diekneite – Music, Sound Effects, Voice Overs)	GANG Award for Best Audio – Other	Won
2005	Reader Rabbit: Wordville Soup (DVD)	Parents' Choice Foundation Award	Recommended
2011	Reader Rabbit: The Great Alphabet Race (DVD)	Parents' Choice Foundation Award	Recommended
2011	Reader Rabbit Kindergarten	Academics' Choice	Won
2011	Reader Rabbit – Kindergarten	Parents' Choice Foundation Award	Approved
2011	Reader Rabbit – 1st Grade	Parents' Choice Foundation Award	Approved
2011	Reader Rabbit – Preschool	Parents' Choice Foundation Award	Approved
2011	Reader Rabbit – 2nd Grade	Parents' Choice Foundation Award	Approved
