= JumpStart Toddlers =

1996 video game

- Developer: Knowledge Adventure
- Publisher: Knowledge Adventure
- Series: JumpStart
- Platform: Microsoft Windows
- Release: Spring 1996
- Genre: Edutainment

JumpStart Toddlers is a 1996 educational video game and the fourth within the JumpStart franchise. An enhanced version was released in 2000.

While the game itself received generally positive reviews, much of the commentary surrounding this title was as a key example of a burgeoning controversial lap-ware video gaming market, targeting children aged 5 and under.

== Development and release ==
The game was designed by Nicole Hardt Wrubel, who spent four years as a lead designer at Knowledge Adventure. JumpStart Toddlers was inspired by her then two-and-a-half year old son, for whom she could not find age-appropriate software.

In order to introduce young players to the concept of interacting with hotspots, players immediately meet Giggles the Gopher, who welcomes them and points out seven hotspots around the screen which lead to activity areas. The game was designed to be part of a full curriculum of games for children to graduate into as they aged; Discover educational toys for children noted that Knowledge Adventure was "one of the few companies that offer a title for toddlers ages 18 months to 3 years".

An enhanced version was released in 2000, published by Havas after a series of mergers and acquisitions involving Knowledge Adventure.

== Critical reception ==
Referring to this title, U.S. News & World Report's article "False Promise" commented, "parents have been told that it's their responsibility to prepare children for a multi-tasking, technology-driven future, so they "JumpStart" their babies". eMERGing Literacy and Technology wrote the title was "appealing to the very young child or a child with limited motor control". Young kids and computers saw it as an example of a software program specifically designed to teach mouse skills, along with Broderbund's My Very First Software. MacUser gave the title 4 out of 5 stars, though noted it had the fewest activities in the series.

Speaking of the game's suitability for those who may not have the precision required to click narrow targets, Fine motor skills in children with Down syndrome's Maryanne Bruni cites JumpStart Toddlers and Reader Rabbit Toddler as preschool programs that reward any mouse movement of keyboard press with an audiovisual cue. Newsweek praised the game (and JumpStart 2nd Grade) as superior to previous entries in the series, noting they "successfully balance letting youngsters explore" and "using animated hosts to spur them on", adding that they "both understand the concept of reward".

Citing JumpStart Toddlers as a key example, Macs for teachers praised the title for its "neat activities...accessible from a classroom setting" and "activities that teach essential early learning skills". A 2000 Wired reviewer noted that after their daughter experienced the game's music, she "walks away from Barney tapes in the VCR and demands Toddlers". SuperKids wrote the game was an "excellent starter program for very young computer novices".

Parenting magazine deemed the 2000 version among the "best software of the year", noting that the title had been "overhauled, with splendid results". The magazine gave the title a B+. The Discovery School site (quoted in Cyber Rules) recommended JumpStart Toddlers 2000 as the "best for older toddlers (or those who have graduated from their baby and other toddler software titles)", and gave it a rating of 4-and-a-half out of 5 stars.

Early Childhood Education Today notes that "although the graphics in JumpStart Toddlers can be moved for an activity, they cannot be controlled or manipulated into any other form".

== Commercial performance and awards ==
The game consistently placed on the PC Data's Best Education Software for MS-DOS/Windows list throughout 1996 and 1997 alongside other Jumpstart titles peaking at #8. Throughout 1997, JumpStart Toddlers took in somewhere between $4 million and $5.16 million. It became one of many preschool titles to join the best-seller list, alongside Sesame Street Elmo's Preschool (1996), Ready to Read With Pooh (1997), and Jumpstart Preschool (1995).

The game won numerous awards, including a 1996 Parent's Choice Gold Medal for best new children's software.

Jumpstart Toddlers 2000 would also reach at least 7th on the PC Data best-selling chart.

== Legacy ==
According to the Chicago Sun-Times, Knowledge Adventure "started the baby trend when it introduced JumpStart Toddlers in 1996". Knowledge Adventure's Jennifer Johnson created the term lap-ware to describe software "intended to be used with the child on the parent's lap...So parents are encouraged to play a really active role in their child's first computer experience". The term was picked up by MacUser that July to describe the new software category Jumpstart had helped create. The New York Times later asserted that Knowledge Adventure was the "vanguard of a trend of introducing younger and younger children -- some as young as 6 months old -- to computers".

While children's software had previously been dominated by titles for older children like Mavis Beacon Teaches Typing and Where in the World Is Carmen Sandiego?, by 1997 sales of software for children under 5 had risen from 179,000 units two years prior to 1.5 million. By September 1997, toddler and pre-school titles dominated PC Data's top-10 selling education list. That November, U.S. News & World Report noted that JumpStart Toddlers, Davidson & Associates's Fisher-Price Ready for Learning: Toddler (1997) and The Learning Company's Reader Rabbit Toddler (1997) were all vying for the lucrative 18-month-and-under demographic over the holiday season.

In 1998, Wired's Susan Kuchinskas similarly applied the neologism to categorise JumpStart Toddlers, JumpStart Baby, and BowWow House's BabyWow! as contemporaries in a burgeoning "lapware" market, which catered to overworked parents who wish to give their new-borns a competitive edge through technology. That year, PC Magazine's Terri Robinson (quoted in 2002 paper Engineering The Entrepreneurial Infant) commented that "software developers are keen to the burgeoning 'baby skills' market" to "capture the imaginations of your 1- and 2-year olds and provide them with solid educational building blocks". Stanford University professor Clifford Nass found this trend "disturbing", commenting that "the social context and the tactile experience [of real objects] are crucial to early development". Similarly, pediatrician T. Berry Brazelton considered lapware like JumpStart Toddlers "an assault on a young child's developing mind".

By this time, just two years after the game's release, JumpStart Toddlers was competing in a crowded lapware market with contemporaries in the edutainment industry. In 2000, a U.S. News & World Report article featured a 13-month old who was already familiar with several games designed for players under two-years old, including JumpStart Toddlers.
