= Reader Rabbit's Interactive Reading Journey =

1994 educational video game

- 1994 cover art
- Developer: The Learning Company
- Publisher: The Learning Company
- Platforms: Windows, Windows 3.x, Macintosh
- Release: October 1994 (Original); 1997 (re-release); 1998 (Ages 4-6); 1999 (Personalized)
- Genres: Adventure, edutainment
- Mode: Single-player

Reader Rabbit's Interactive Reading Journey is a 1994 video game released on the Windows and Macintosh systems. It is the sixth game in the Reader Rabbit franchise. Designed for ages 4 till 7, the game introduces the new main characters Mat the Mouse and Sam the Lion who accompany Reader. It was then re-released in 1997 under the title Reader Rabbit's Interactive Reading Journey For Grades K-1, followed by another in 1998 titled Reader Rabbit's Reading Ages 4–6 and a personalized version in 1999.

== Educational goals ==
The game teaches users how to read effectively. Forty storybooks can be read aloud or narrated to the user. Over 100 reading exercises include phonics, word-recognition, spelling skills and building vocabulary. The activities incorporate repetition of words, followed by a gradual increase of word variety. The game challenges users to keep learning independently and helps them to become interested in reading. It also allows older users to build up on their previous skills. Overall, Reading Journey allows learners to set their reading progress at their own page. The game came packaged with printed versions of 40 stories included in the game, which aid in reading along at the computer or independent reading away from the computer.

== Reception ==
Reception

Review scores
Publication	Score
CD-ROM Today	5/5
PC Magazine	4/5
MacUser	4/5

Awards
Publication	Award
Home PC	Award of Excellence
Parenting	Software Magic Award
Parent Council	Seal for Outstanding Product
Technology & Learning	Award of Excellence for the School Category
Parents' Choice	Foundation Approval
Mac Home	Reader's Choice Award
CD-ROM Today	Best Children's Program-Reading Award
Home Computing & Entertainment	Best Educational Program Award

CD-ROM Today rated the game 5 stars, meriting its simple interface and artistic design.

PC Magazine wrote that the game facilitates learning in a non-threatening and effective way. Creating Ever-cool noted that as the difficulty increases with each book, readers feel a "thrill of accomplishment" upon progressing. Working Mother praised the title's "creative approach". The Washington Post praised the animation as "crisp and humorous". The Parents Magazine declared that the game was the most comprehensive reading skill software of that time.

In June 1997, Interactive Reading Journey Learning and Interactive Reading Journey 2 were the 5th and 6th best selling reading titles.
