= Reader Rabbit (video game) =

1984 video game

- Developers: The Learning Company; The Connelley Group (Atari 8-bit)
- Publisher: The Learning Company
- Series: Reader Rabbit
- Platforms: Original; Apple II, Apple IIGS, Atari 8-bit, Commodore 64, MS-DOS, Mac; Talking; Apple IIGS; Reader Rabbit 1 MS-DOS; Deluxe; MS-DOS, Windows 3.x, Mac; Reader Rabbit's Reading 1 Windows, Mac
- Release: 1984 (Original); 1989 (Talking); 1991 (Reader Rabbit 1); 1994 (Deluxe); 1997 (Reading 1)
- Genre: Educational
- Mode: Single-player

Reader Rabbit (fully titled "Reader Rabbit and the Fabulous Word Factory" or alternatively known as "Reader Rabbit Builds Early Learning & Thinking") is a 1984 educational video game and the first of the long-running Reader Rabbit edutainment series. It was made by The Learning Company for Apple II and later for other computers. It supports the KoalaPad graphics tablet. The Connelley Group helped with the Atari 8-bit computers conversion in 1984. A Talking version was developed for the Apple IIGS in 1989. An enhanced version was released for MS-DOS in 1991. A Deluxe version was released in 1994 for Mac and Windows 3.x. In 1997, the game was remade for Windows and Macintosh under the title "Reader Rabbit's Reading 1".

== Gameplay ==
The game takes place in the titular Word Factory, which teaches reading and spelling in four different activities and has over 200 three-letter words and more than 70 pictures for learning. The following four activities are:

- 1. Sorter - the player is required to pick words that start with a chosen letter and discard the rest.
- 2. Labeler - out of a number of mixed up letters, the player must use those letters to spell words that match three objects on the screen.
- 3. Word Train - the player needs to select a word that slightly differs from the first.
- 4. Matchup Games - the player must match picture cards with corresponding word cards.

== Development ==
Reader Rabbit version 1.0 (1984)

Reader Rabbit was originally conceived by the Grimm sisters; Leslie authored the game while Corinne and Cindy contributed the art. Version 1.0 of Reader Rabbit, titled Reader Rabbit and the Fabulous Word Factory, was released in early 1984 (and featured in the 1983 holiday special for Computer Chronicles), while versions 1.1, 1.2 and 1.3 were released in 1984. Development for an updated 2.0 version began at the start of 1984. By this time, Leslie Grimm had suffered a disc fracture but was able to develop the game while bedridden, thanks to a detachable keyboard provided by her colleague Pete Rowe. Many critics and gaming historians erroneously assert that the Reader Rabbit series officially began in 1986.

In 1988, the first "talking" version of Reader Rabbit was released for the Apple IIGS and Tandy 1000 computers. The game was remade as an enhanced version for MS-DOS in 1991 to incorporate the 256-color VGA mode, sound card option and mouse compatibility. Another remake was done as a deluxe version along with its two sequels and implemented digitized speech.

== Reception ==
Reception

Awards
| Publication | Award |
|---|---|
| Newsweek | Editors' Choice Award, 1995 (Deluxe) |
| Gold Medal | National Association of Parenting Publications, 1994 (Deluxe) |
| Reseller Management | "Best to Sell" Software Product - Education, 1992 (Reader Rabbit 1) |
| Program of the Decade | Language Arts, Technology & Learning, 1991 (Reader Rabbit 1) |
| Parents' Choice | Best Software of the Year, 1987 (Original) |
| Family Computing | Critics' Choice Award, 1985 (Original) |

The Learning Company showcased the game alongside Number Stamper, Word Spinner, Addition Magician and Colorasaurus in the 1984 Winter Consumer Electronics Show. Dr. Ann Piestrup praised the game for its ability to aid young learners in overcoming the difficulties of reading and its word recognition.
