= Challenge of the Ancient Empires! =

1990 video game

- Box cover art
- Developer: The Learning Company
- Publisher: The Learning Company
- Platforms: MS-DOS, Macintosh
- Release: 1990
- Genre: Educational/Adventure
- Mode: Single-player

Challenge of the Ancient Empires!, also known as Ancient Empires, is an educational computer game created by The Learning Company in 1990 for both MS-DOS and Macintosh. It is designed to improve history, logic, and problem solving skills in children ages 10 and up.

Challenge of the Ancient Empires! is an adventure game whose objective is to obtain the artifacts hidden in each of the four regions. To do this, the player must navigate through cavern chambers, dodging enemies and obstacles, recovering pieces of artifacts and putting them together in a tiling puzzle in order to advance to the next level.

== Gameplay ==
The objective of Challenge of the Ancient Empires! is to collect the hidden treasures from caverns in 4 different regions of the world: Greece and Rome, Egypt, India and China, and the Near East. Each of these caverns consists of four chambers. The decorations and artifacts in each of these chambers correlates to the region being explored. For example, the Egyptian cavern features decorations of hieroglyphs and mummies and will contain artifacts like the sphinx or the Rosetta Stone.

Screenshot from Challenge of the Ancient Empires!.

Additionally, each cavern has a different style of puzzle: the Near East section implements switches that move panels blocking the way, while the Egyptian section consists mainly of triangular reflectors, which the player must orient correctly to direct a light beam and trigger a switch. Greece and Rome caverns involve Greek-letter-coded gates that open by entering the right combination. India and China involves the manipulation of conveyor belts to advance in the proper direction. Upon successfully navigating a chamber's puzzle and collecting six pieces of the artifact, the player must then solve a puzzle by orienting and placing rectangular puzzle pieces in the proper configuration to reveal a picture of the artifact. Afterwards, they must find the exit door and solve a logic puzzle to advance to the next chamber.

The four main caverns, associated with the four regions of the world, may be played in any order. Once the player completes all four chambers in each of the four caverns, a new cavern opens. This cavern is referred to as the "Ancient World" and is composed of four new chambers. Each chamber is in the style of one of the four regions from the previous caverns. The Ancient World cavern is more difficult than the others and consists of a combination of all the puzzles in the main caverns.

The player has three items to help them navigate through each cavern's puzzles. These items include a miner's hat, a pair of special shoes, called "turbo tennies" that allow the player to jump higher, and four force fields that will protect the player from all damage for a few seconds. The miner's hat shines a beam of light used to flip switches or temporarily stun any cave animals that can cause the player damage. The Egyptian cavern has several challenges that involve rotating prisms and mirrors to deflect the light beam to a specific sensor. The shoes allow the player to jump much higher than a normal. A force field will prevent all damage for five seconds when used, but the player is only given four of them per level.

A display at the bottom of the screen show the player's current collected artifact pieces, chosen tool, current cavern and chamber, and remaining energy. The energy bar functions as a life bar and has four segments. If the player comes into contact with a cave animal or a projectile, one segment is depleted. If all four segments are lost, the player must begin the chamber over again. Health can be restored either by picking up apples in the caverns or by correctly solving a logic puzzle on the first attempt.

The game provides two distinct difficulty levels: Explorer and Expert. The chambers of the four main caverns are similar in puzzle style, but differ in layout, number, speed of the enemies, and availability of health power-ups. Additionally, on Expert difficulty, the logic puzzles are more challenging and include an entirely different set of artifacts. The puzzles on this difficulty contain pieces that require being flipped, in order to be oriented correctly.

== Development ==
=== Super Solvers series ===
Originally titled Challenge of the Ancient Empires!, it was released as a part of the Super Solvers series released by The Learning Company that contain both educational and entertainment qualities. The following year its name was shortened to Ancient Empires as it was removed from the Super Solvers series and paired with Operation Neptune.

=== Music ===
In lieu of an original score, the background music consists of arrangements of pieces by a number of famous composers including Tchaikovsky, Brahms, Erik Satie and Verdi.

- Map Screen: Satie's Gnossienne #1
- Greece and Rome: A theme from the fourth movement of Brahms' Symphony No. 1
- Egypt: Tchaikovsky's Slavonic March
- Near East: Satie's Gnossienne #3
- End: Verdi's Triumph March from Aida

== Reception ==
Reception

Review scores
Publication	Score
Computer Gaming World	3/5
Abandonia	4.0 out of 5
Viewpoints	4/5

Award
Publication	Award
Home of the Underdogs	Top Dog Award

The Challenge of Ancient Empires! received good reviews. Computer Gaming World gave it three stars out of five, favorably reviewing its graphics and audio. Users at MobyGames gave the game an average rating of 3.7 out of 5, calling it a game that combines adventure and puzzle and is suitable for kids and adults alike. At Abandonia, the game is given a rating of 4.0 out of 5 due to pleasing graphics, music and sound, and simple controls. A review on Viewpoints gives the game a 4.0 out of 5 because the game was designed for entertainment and educational value.
