= Mission: T.H.I.N.K. =

1997 video game

- Windows cover art
- Developer: The Learning Company
- Publisher: The Learning Company
- Composer: Yellowjackets
- Platforms: PC (Windows, Macintosh)
- Release: NA: 1997
- Genre: Puzzle
- Mode: Single-player

Mission T.H.I.N.K. (Thinking Hard Inspires New Knowledge) is the final addition to the Super Solvers series created by The Learning Company. Morty Maxwell tries to take over the Shady Glen Game Factory with help of the Metal Minions. The game cultivates critical thinking skills by encouraging players to solve puzzles and create strategies. The original score in the five levels is by the fusion ensemble Yellowjackets.

== Production ==
The game was part of a promotion with Tootsie Roll Industries, Inc., where along with Where in the U.S.A. is Carmen Sandiego? and Reader Rabbit's Kindergarten, the game featured in The Family Learning Fun Pack, and packaged inside Tootsie products.

== Gameplay and plot ==
Players must complete five levels to finish the game. The levels themselves are identical to the ones featured in an earlier game, Gizmos & Gadgets!. Each level involves going through a warehouse, solving puzzles to open doors, and collecting pieces that must be used to win a checkers-like strategy game at the end of the level. While exploring the warehouse, the player must avoid having their pieces stolen by the Metal Minions. A magnet can be thrown to trap a Metal Minion and reclaim a stolen piece - the magnets themselves can be used an infinite number of times. After beating Morty at all five levels, a puzzle is put together portraying him leaving the factory. Along the way, the player is helped by Rusty, a Metal Minion who didn't like what Morty was doing.

== Critical reception ==
Hilary Williams of Allgame thought the game was "entertaining", and praised it for cultivating various cognitive skills within the player. [null Rocky Mountain News] wrote the "engaging game" was an easier version of Gizmos & Gadgets!. The Booklist thought the activities within the game are "challenging and skill enriching".
