= Math Rabbit =

1986 educational video game

- Developer: The Learning Company
- Publisher: The Learning Company
- Series: Reader Rabbit
- Platforms: Original; Apple II, MS-DOS; Deluxe; MS-DOS, Windows 3.x, Mac; Reader Rabbit's Math 1 Windows, Mac; Reader Rabbit Math Ages 4–6; Windows, Mac
- Release: 1986: Original; 1993: Deluxe; 1997: Math 1; 1998: Math Ages 4–6; 1999: Personalized
- Genre: Educational video game
- Mode: Single-player

Math Rabbit is a spin-off of the Reader Rabbit educational video game series. It was published by The Learning Company in 1986 for MS-DOS and Apple II. A Deluxe version was released in 1993 for MS-DOS, Mac, and Windows 3.x. In 1997, a remake was released for Windows and Mac as Reader Rabbit's Math 1. The final remake for Windows and Macintosh was published in 1998 as Reader Rabbit's Math Ages 4–6, with a personalized version released in 1999.

== Gameplay ==
The game takes place in a circus and teaches addition, subtraction, and counting in four different games, each of which with multiple difficulty settings. The game is for ages 4–8. The four games are:

1. Clown's Counting Games – the player is required to count with a number as a guide to pitch the tone of the musical instrument.
2. Tightrope Game – the player has to help Reader Rabbit match a picture of objects with a displaying number and discard the pictures that don't match.
3. Circus Train Game – the player has complete a sequence of numbers each being added to a particular number.
4. Mystery Matching Game – the player has to match turn over cards and find matching pictures of items and corresponding numbers.

Since Math Rabbit Deluxe, the games were retitled "Calliope Counting Game", "Tightrope Show", "Sea Lion Show", and "Balloon Matching Game", respectively, but the game objectives and rules remain the same.

== Development ==

The game was originally designed by Teri Perl and programmed by Aaron Weiss. Upon the release of the Deluxe edition, Bill Dinsmore, The Learning Company president and chief executive officer, said: "With the release of Reader Rabbit 1 and Math Rabbit for Windows, we now offer five Windows educational software products that help to develop important learning skills".

The original art of Math Rabbit was done by Analee Nunan. For Math Rabbit Deluxe 256 color VGA graphics were applied. The original music and sound composition were done by Teri Perl and Aaron Weiss. For Math Rabbit Deluxe, AdLib soundtracks were composed.

The activities teach numerical relationships to young users. It has a scope, sequence guide, and lab pack.

== Reception ==
Reception

Award
Publication	Award
Parent's Choice	1987 Award

The program received highly positive reviews from critics. In particular, the Chicago Sun-Times championed it in seven articles.

The Los Angeles Times said the game was "sweet", though Millie's Math House made it "look kind of buttoned-down". FOGG praised the easy-to-use gaming interface, and The Washington Post said it is "entertaining" while incorporating valuable lessons into "colorfully fun graphics". Superkids described the game as "excellent" and said it was a great first introduction to educational video gaming for the target audience. Don Crabb, writing for the Chicago Sun-Times, recommended the "outstanding" software for the 1989 holiday season and noted it was among the "high-quality educational software sold", and that it was one of the best educational releases for offering a "solid instructional model" for teaching kids the fundamentals of mathematics through "smoothly" integrating the gaming and learning without "bogging them down in mindless mathematical trivia", such as by teaching geometry at a very early age. Computer Shopper said the product was "remarkably good software", and positively compared its depth and carde gameplay to Power Rangers ZEO PowerActive. PC Mag said the game "moves beyond" Stickybear Numbers and Math and Me due to its customization options. Computer Gaming World in 1994 stated that "Math Rabbit is very easy to use, and accommodates different learning styles. It's a fun program kids can really count on".

=== Commercial performance ===
Math Rabbit is the seventh most popular in the education category sold across eleven Software Etc. stores in the Washington area in the week ending on August 23, 1995.
