= Starflyers =

- From left to right: Io, Katie Cadet, Superspinner AJ, Klanker and Vexar.
- Genres: Adventure, arcade, edutainment
- Developer: Riverdeep (The Learning Company brand)
- Publisher: Riverdeep (The Learning Company brand)
- Platforms: Windows, Macintosh
- First release: Starflyers Royal Jewel Rescue; June 2002
- Latest release: Starflyers Alien Space Chase; July 2002

Starflyers is an edutainment software franchise created in 2002 by Riverdeep under their The Learning Company label. The franchise consists of two games, Starflyers Royal Jewel Rescue and Starflyers Alien Space Chase.

== Concept ==
=== Plot ===
Katherine Diane Cadell (a girl with attitude) fantasizes herself and her best friend Ajay as intergalactic heroes Katie Cadet and Super Spinner AJ respectively teamed up with an alien dog named Io and a space robot named Klanker. Their missions consist of fighting against the evil Vexar (their neighborhood bully Victor Wexlar in reality). In Starflyers Royal Jewel Rescue, Katie Cadet is on a search for Princess Popcorn's missing jewels, in real life searching for her mother's scattered jewels. In Starflyers Alien Space Chase, Katie Cadet is tasked with rescuing the galaxy's missing ambassadors kidnapped by Vexar, actually the class pets that were let loose in the school by Victor Wexlar. She is the galaxy's most famous star pilot. She uses a vehicle (known as the "SnoozeCruiser") to transport her team to various parts of the universe.

=== Gameplay ===
Both games have a mixture of arcade and adventure elements in them. In each game, the player is required to play 8 arcade-style minigames. The minigames have three adjustable levels of difficulty. To progress in the games, the player will also need to collect a currency called Galaxy Seeds. The game interface includes a control menu for storing tools and items found until the player finds the right place to use them. There are also printable activities available.

== Design ==
=== Development ===
Starflyers had been in the planning stage since 1998. According to the teaser made around 1999 or 2000, the trailer was released under the working title Katie Cadet. Following an agreement with Immersion Corporation, the Touchsense Technology was implemented in both games for easier use of the mouse. When Riverdeep acquired The Learning Company in September 2001, they marketed the games under TLC's name. Along with Carmen Sandiego, ClueFinders, and Reader Rabbit, the Starflyers games were licensed to the KidsEdge Website in 2002 where they were available to play among 170 games and activities.

=== Art ===
Managing artist Fred Dinada designed the Katie Cadet in 2001. Some of his artwork was salvaged from concepts that were not used in his previous project Reader Rabbit Preschool: Sparkle Star Rescue. Additional artwork was added by Cat & Dog Productions, Igloo Animations, and Tim Nelson. Some lineart was worked on by Gerald Broas who used a 2B pencil to hand draw the backgrounds and characters on 12 field animation paper. Animations and background were worked on by Fred Dianda. To allow all the content to fit on CD, all digitised images had to be converted from true colors to 256 colors and simplicity was applied to reduce quality loss. The animation was produced and led by Eileen Gay.

== Educational goals ==
The Starflyers games consist of a mix of arcade and puzzle games without any pressuring time limit, designed to enhance players' critical thinking and problem-solving, memory-sequencing, and creativity skills, as well as developing eye-hand coordination for mastering basic computer skills.

== Reception ==
=== Critical reception ===
PC Magazine gave Royal Jewel Rescue 4 out of 5 stars, marking it as an Excellent game. A few months later that same magazine gave both games combined 5 out 5 stars, marking them as Outstanding and an Editor's Choice.

=== Awards and nominations ===
Year	Nominee / work	Award	Result
2002	Starflyers: Royal Jewel Rescue	Parents' Choice Gold Award	Won
2002	Starflyers: Alien Space Chase	Parents' Choice Gold Award	Won
2002	Starflyers: Royal Jewel Rescue	Award of Excellence	Won
2002	Starflyers: Alien Space Chase	Award of Excellence	Won
