= Reader Rabbit's Interactive Reading Journey 2 =

1996 educational video game

- Cover art
- Developer(s): The Learning Company
- Publisher(s): The Learning Company
- Platform(s): Windows, Macintosh
- Release: October 15, 1996 (Original); 1997 (re-release); 1998 (Ages 6-9); 1999 (Personalized)
- Genre(s): Adventure, edutainment
- Mode(s): Single-player

Reader Rabbit's Interactive Reading Journey 2 is a 1996 video game released on the Windows and Macintosh systems and designed for ages 5 till 8. It is the seventh game in the Reader Rabbit franchise and a sequel to Reader Rabbit's Interactive Reading Journey. It was re-released in 1997 as Reader Rabbit's Interactive Reading Journey For Grades 1-2, followed by another in 1998 titled Reader Rabbit's Reading Ages 6–9 and a personalized version in 1999.

== Educational goals ==
The game reinforces the reading skills of older children to allow for confidence and language skills. Although deemed too difficult for young users by an Adult Juror, being able to record voice narration is good reading practice. Multilevel activities include phonics, initial letter blends and word recognition. The game also includes 30 different storybooks during the gameplay to widen reading comprehension, reasoning and vocabulary.

== Reception ==
Reception

Awards
| Publication | Award |
|---|---|
| SuperKids | Software Award for Best Reading Software |
| National Educational Media Network | Silver Apple |
| Newsweek | Editor's Choice Award 1997 |
| Parent's Choice | Gold Award |

In 1996 the game won the SuperKids Software Award for Best Reading Software. Then in 1997, it won some more awards including the National Educational Media Network Silver Apple, the Newsweek Editor's Choice and the Parent's Choice Gold Award.
