= Reader Rabbit's Ready for Letters =

1992 educational video game

- Developer: The Learning Company
- Publisher: The Learning Company
- Designer: Lauren Elliott
- Series: Reader Rabbit
- Platforms: MS-DOS, Classic Mac OS, Windows 3.x
- Release: August 1992: MS-DOS; 1993: Mac; 1994: Windows 3.x
- Genre: Edutainment
- Mode: Single-player

Reader Rabbit's Ready for Letters is an educational video game developed and published by The Learning Company and the fifth game of the Reader Rabbit franchise. It was published in 1992 for MS-DOS, 1993 for Classic Mac OS, and in 1994 for Windows 3.x.

== Educational goals ==
The game was designed with a re-usability value, which help children develop new language skills and sharpen old ones. The game allows for free exploration and offers activities that enable children to begin learning to read. The modules included teach shape recognition, matching and basic word skills. The digitized voices encourage direction, exercises listening comprehension and helps tie language to words. The concept of cause-and-effect is implemented. The activities expose prereaders to letters, simple words, word relationships, creativity, colors, shapes and matching. Music and animations add to retain interest.

== Gameplay ==
The game takes place in the house and garden of Grandma and Grandpa Rabbit. There are two modes during gameplay; the free-form mode, which allows players to do the activities are in their own way and the goal-based mode, which instructs the player what to do. The game consists of six activities:

1. The Music Pond
2. Grandma's Kitchen
3. The Mix-and-Match Bedroom
4. The ABC Bathroom
5. The Picture Parlor
6. Grandpa's Workshop

== Reception ==
Reception

Review score
Publication	Score
MacUser	2.5/5

Award
Publication	Award
High Scope Award	Best Childhood Software

The Managing Editor of PCM Magazine Sue Fomby highlighted the game for its gameplay that helped children to start reading. MacUser gave the game 2 and a half stars, being suited for the youngest and lesser experienced prereaders. The game was reviewed in the Oppenheim Toy Portfolio Guide Book where it was praised for its "snappy and colorful" graphics.
