= Reader Rabbit's Reading Development Library =

Educational video game series

- Box art of the first CD product
- Genres: Adventure, edutainment
- Developer: The Learning Company
- Publisher: The Learning Company
- Composer: Kevin Village-Stone
- Platforms: Windows, Macintosh
- First release: Reader Rabbit's Reading Development Library 1; 1995
- Latest release: Reader Rabbit's Reading Development Library 4; 1996

Reader Rabbit's Reading Development Library is a series of four edutainment games from The Learning Company as part of the Reader Rabbit franchise. The first two games were developed in October 1995 and the last two were developed in 1996. The products make use of interactive storybooks based on fairy tales to help early readers broaden their reading, vocabulary, writing and word recognition skills. Each number in the title corresponds to the reading level of the reader they are aimed at.

== Gameplay ==
In each game, the player has two storybooks to choose from. There are three versions of each story, the first told by Sam the narrator called the "Classic" version and the latter two as different perspectives of characters from the story. The story can be read entirely by the narrator or it can be read by the user with guidelines. The games also include three activities to further enhance learning to read. With both the manual and automatic modes, users can read the stories at their own pace.

== Books ==
Game	Release	Book	Pages	Alternate narrator 1	Alternate narrator 2
Development Library 1	1995	The Three Little Pigs	21	Second Pig	Wolf
Development Library 1	1995	Goldilocks and the Three Bears	21	Goldilocks	Baby Bear
Development Library 2	1995	City Mouse, Country Mouse	19	City Mouse	Country Mouse
Development Library 2	1995	Jack and the Beanstalk	22	Giant	Jack
Development Library 3	Winter 1996	The Princess and the Pea	16	Princess Laurel	Prince Albert
Development Library 3	Winter 1996	The Goose that Laid the Golden Egg	14	Goose	Mr. Farmer
Development Library 4	1996	King Midas	16	Merrigold	King Midas
Development Library 4	1996	The Ugly Duckling	13	Quill	Mr. Croak

== Availability ==
Reader Rabbit's Reading Development Library 2 was included as the second CD in Reader Rabbit's Complete Learn to Read System, simply titled "Classic Tales".

== Reception ==
Reception

Review scores
Publication	Score
CD-ROM Today	4/5 (Level 1 & 2)
Family PC	85% (Level 3)
MacUser	4/5

The games were positively reviewed and praised primarily for the variety of retelling the story from multiple points of view.

== See also ==
- Disney's Animated Storybook
- Living Books
- Magic Tales
- Playtoons
- The Kidstory Series
