= Reader Rabbit Toddler =

1997 education video game

- CD cover art
- Developer: KnowWare
- Publisher: The Learning Company
- Series: Reader Rabbit
- Platforms: Windows, Macintosh
- Release: June 1997
- Genre: Edutainment
- Mode: Single-player

Reader Rabbit Toddler (also known as Reader Rabbit's Toddler) is a 1997 educational video game developed by KnowWare and published by The Learning Company. It is part of the Reader Rabbit series.

== Development ==
=== Production ===
The game was part of Reader Rabbit's Early Learning Series, along with Reader Rabbit Preschool and Reader Rabbit Kindergarten. The game was packaged with Reader Rabbit Playtime for Baby into Reader Rabbit Playtime for Baby and Toddler.

=== Educational goals ===
The game minimizes the presence of text to make it easy for illiterate players and to keep them interested. Users are free to click on objects without being prompted, allowing for flexible exploration. Children are able to bridge together the keyboard inputs and screen outputs in the gameplay. Much younger children are recommended to experience the game with an older sibling or adult who will give them adequate help. The activities in the game are intended to prepare a child for preschool including number and letter recognition and sequencing, patterns, matching, sorting and basic phonic skills. Difficulty in the game increases with every success made, although the focus is not about getting answers correct but rather learning from incorrect ones.

== Gameplay ==
The players do not need to use a point-and-click interface to seek enjoyment from the game. They simply have to roll their mouse over hotspots to interact with the game. The game has eight activities, including Peek-a-Boo Zoo, the Bubble Castle and Musical Meadow. The product has multiple difficulty levels.

== Reception ==
=== Critical reception ===
SuperKids noted the game appealed to both children and their parents. Edutaining Kids thought the title was the best educational game for toddlers, and a "delightful introduction" into using computers. TechWithKids deemed the title a "winner". DiscoverySchool thought the game was "exceptional", "useful", and "exudes warmth" toward the player. ReviewCorner praised the game's graphics, activities, and the simple interface. Allgame said the graphics were more sophisticated than other Reader Rabbit titles, due to having 3D backgrounds and shading on the 2D characters. Black Enterprise said the graphics were "clean, bright and simple". The Exceptional Parent thought the game had "enjoyable cause and effect". According to Chicago Sun-Times, the developers understood "what young kids are capable of doing". Redbook praised the game for being playable by kids who were unable to use the point and click mouse interface. Post-Tribune thought the game was a "perfect first-time introduction to the computer". PC Mag said the game had "unmistakable shortcomings".

=== Commercial performance ===
Reader Rabbit Toddler was the 9th top-selling education video game in October and November 1997, and the week ended in February 1998. The game generated $1.8 million in revenue.
