= Vlad Tepes Dracula =

1997 video game

- Developer: ComputerHouse GBG AB
- Publisher: The Learning Company / SoftKey Multimedia
- Platform: Windows
- Release: 1997
- Genres: Turn-Based Strategy, Real-time tactics

Vlad Tepes Dracula is a Swedish 1997 video game. In English the game is known as Dracula: Reign of Terror.

== Plot ==
Set in the 15th century, the player is Romanian general Vlad III whose goal is to recapture lands that were lost to the Ottoman Empire.

== Gameplay ==
The game is a micro-management kingdom simulator, similar to Lords of the Realm. The game combines real-time tactics and turn-based strategy. The real-time portion covers seizing of territory and castles. The turn-based mode provides a world map view with provinces under your control. It includes construction of buildings, and upgrading of units. This turn-based mode ends when an attack from either player or computer opponent occurs. However, the player can switch to the RTS phase at any time. Spies are a valuable strategic feature to uncover map and enemy positions in turn-based mode.

== Critical reception ==
Game Side Story said the game would appeal to fans of the RTS genre, particularly fans of the game Risk. However, it also said the lacking AI can lead to tedium in managing troops and RTS battles.
