= Treasure Galaxy! =

1994 video game

- Developer: The Learning Company
- Publisher: The Learning Company
- Platforms: Windows, Classic Mac OS, MS-DOS
- Release: NA: 1994
- Genre: Educational
- Mode: Single-player

Treasure Galaxy! is an educational video game published by The Learning Company in 1994 for Windows, MS-DOS, and Mac. It intended to teach children ages 5 to 9 reading, basic mathematics and logic skills. Treasure Galaxy is part of the Super Seekers games.

== Plot ==
After being removed from Treasure Cove, the Master of Mischief goes to Crystal City in deep space. After turning the harmless asteroids into menacing Disasteroids, the Master of Mischief attacks Crystal City and shatters its crystals. The Super Seekers are summoned to recover the crystal shards and save Crystal City from the Master of Mischief.

== Gameplay ==
The goal of Treasure Galaxy! is to recover all of the crystals and return them to the Queen in her palace. To gather crystals, the player must first capture animated fireballs called "sunbeams" and answer their riddles. If answered correctly, a sunbeam will help the player decode a cipher that must be cracked in order to access the crystals hidden in the satellites. Each stage has different cipher that applies to all the satellites in that particular stage.

There are three separate stages, or orbits, of play, and the player may not move on to the next stage until he has learned the 4-digit passcode. The passcode can be obtained by completing various challenges posed by aliens that can be found in each stage. The challenges pertain to real-world scenarios such as using a calendar to find a certain date, tangrams, measuring with a ruler and measuring with a scale.

The difficulty of each separate category of puzzle changes according to how well the player does with that type of puzzle. At higher ranks, the game becomes more difficult, as there will be more crystals to find and disasteroids that steal star bucks.

The computer game starts with a story.

== Development ==
=== Educational focus ===
Treasure Galaxy! is specifically designed to develop a broad range of mathematics and critical-thinking skills within an environment of interactive and engaging game play. The program helps five-to nine-year-old children build real-world mathematics skills, including identifying basic fractions, measuring length and weight, and locating calendar dates. Automatic educational leveling allows players to learn at appropriate and challenging rates for each individual activity. The program adjusts the level of difficulty, depending on the player's success.

=== Treasure series ===
Treasure Galaxy! is one of four games in The Learning Company's "Treasure" series along with Treasure Cove!, Treasure Mathstorm! and Treasure Mountain!. The series is a subgroup of the company's Super Seekers games. All the games in this series are mathematics and reading comprehension oriented educational adventure games aimed at younger children. Games in the treasure series all have the same three stage gameplay format where a special object, whose location can be deduced by answering questions, is needed to reach the next stage.
