= Treasure MathStorm! =

1992 video game

- Developer: The Learning Company
- Publisher: The Learning Company
- Platforms: MS-DOS, Windows, Classic Mac OS
- Release: 1992:MS-DOS; 1994: Windows 3.x, Mac; 1996–1997: Windows, Mac
- Genres: Educational, adventure
- Mode: Single-player

Treasure MathStorm! is an educational video game to teach children ages five to nine mathematical problem solving. This sequel to Treasure Mountain! is the sixth installment of The Learning Company's Super Seekers games and the second in its "Treasure" series.

The objective of Treasure MathStorm! is to return all of the treasures hidden across the mountain to the treasure chest in the castle at the top of the mountain. Although it runs smoother and has better graphics, basic gameplay is very similar to that of its predecessor. In 1994, an enhanced and more Windows-friendly version was released on CD-ROM.

== Gameplay ==
The game takes place in a magical realm called Treasure Mountain. As the game opens, the Master of Mischief, the common antagonist to the Super Seekers games, uses a weather machine to freeze the mountain in snow and ice and scatters the castle's treasures all over the mountain. The player takes on the role of the Super Seeker, whose job is to find the scattered treasures and return them to the castle's treasure chest in order to thaw out the mountain.

The mountain itself consists of three levels. The player cannot climb higher until he has gathered the supplies, like ice axes, ladders, or catapult parts, useful for scaling the mountain. To obtain these items, the players must help out the local inhabitants complete math-related tasks such as adjusting clocks to a given time, balancing scales, and counting crystals.

In order to find treasures, the player must place a specific amount of snowballs at a certain location. To find out how many snowballs are needed, the player must catch an elf carrying a scroll. If he answers the riddle correctly, he will be told how to find treasures on that particular level.

Once the player reaches the top of the castle on the highest level of the mountain, he deposits all treasures found into the castle's treasure chest and is given a prize as a reward for completing the three stages. This prize is kept on display in the player's clubhouse, showing how many times he has ascended the mountain. These prizes are usually children's toys, such as flutes or toy trains. From this point, the player may exit the clubhouse and start again from the bottom of the mountain. At higher ranks, the game becomes more difficult, as there will be more treasures to find, harder riddles to answer, and snowbullies that steal money.

== Development ==
=== Treasure series ===
Treasure MathStorm! is the second of four games in The Learning Company's "Treasure" series along with Treasure Mountain!, Treasure Cove!, and Treasure Galaxy!. The "Treasure" series is a subgroup of the company's Super Solvers series. All the games in this series are math and reading comprehension oriented educational adventure games aimed at younger children. Games in the treasure series all have the same three stage gameplay format where a special object, whose location can be deduced by answering educational riddles, is needed to reach the next stage.

=== Music ===
Treasure MathStorm implements a number of classical pieces, most notably, Johann Sebastian Bach's Invention No. 8.

== Reception ==
Treasure MathStorm! was reviewed in the Oppenheim Toy Portfolio Guide Book where it was praised for its "richly illustrated full-color programs that feature sound-card support". The authors claimed that "it works!" and that it was "highly recommended for 6–8 [year old children]".
