= Reader Rabbit 3 =

1993 video game

Reader Rabbit 3 Reader Rabbit 3 Deluxe!
- Cover art for Reader Rabbit 3 Deluxe!
- Developer: The Learning Company
- Publisher: The Learning Company
- Series: Reader Rabbit
- Platforms: MS-DOS; Deluxe: Windows, Mac
- Release: 1993: MS-DOS; September 1994: Mac, Windows
- Genre: Educational
- Mode: Single-player

Reader Rabbit 3 is an educational video game which is part of the Reader Rabbit series. It was released for MS-DOS in 1993, then in 1994 for Windows and Mac as Reader Rabbit 3 Deluxe!.

== Plot ==
The game sees series protagonist Reader Rabbit join the Daily Skywriter, the daily newspaper for his home town Wordville. He has to identify the right information to put into his stories. The game was designed to build critical reading skills, by applying speech rules to a real-world scenario.

== Gameplay ==
Reader Rabbit 3 is made up of five different activities that teach player's the structure of the English language. The following activities are:

- 1. What's the Scoop? / Who? What? When? – the player must determine correctly whether the topic of a sentence is a what, a where, a when or a who.
- 2. Clue Hounds / Get the Scoop + Crack the Case – the player must locate the what, where, when and who parts of story sentences. After completing the sentences the player must pick a character associated with the story.
- 3. Sneak Peek / Rave Reviews – the player has to choose a sentence that contains the three elements who/what, did what and where.
- 4. Ed Words / Write Right – the player must fill in the blanks of a paragraph with the three elements do what, where and when.
- 5. Printing Press – the player is given the option to physically print out the news story.

The game contains over 200 different news stories to work from. The Deluxe version contains 20 different digitized voices that add to the dramatization to the game.

== Critical reception ==
PC Mag reviewer Charles Taft wrote that the game was "fun to play", while praising its replayability (four levels of difficulty and multiple stories), as well as its "delightful" animations. The game was regarded as a winner in the book "Only the Best: The Annual Guide to the Highest-Rated Educational Software/Multimedia".
