= Reader Rabbit: Jumpsmarter =

2018 educational video game

- Developer: Dashalope Games
- Publisher: Games4Kids Sverige AB
- Director: Björn Larsson
- Producers: Jonny Törn; Björn Larsson
- Artist: Adriá Regordosa
- Composers: Simone Cicconi; Björn Larsson
- Series: Reader Rabbit
- Platforms: iOS, Apple TV, macOS
- Release: 25 September 2018; 7 November 2018 (macOS)
- Genres: Educational, platform
- Mode: Single-player

Reader Rabbit: Jumpsmarter is an educational platform game developed by Dashalope Games and published by Games4Kids for iOS, Apple TV, and macOS. It is the latest game of the Reader Rabbit series. Reader Rabbit: Jumpsmarter educates players, aimed at young children, on different subjects including math, English, and science, by adventuring with Reader Rabbit and his friends.

== Gameplay and plot ==
Reader Rabbit: Jumpsmarter is a 2D platforming game. Reader Rabbit has to go through multiple levels collecting carrots, books, and letters spelling out the word S.M.A.R.T. Reader Rabbit has acorns to throw at enemies. Enemies can also be avoided altogether. Reader Rabbit: Jumpsmarter supports all (MFi) game controllers that are licensed by Apple. The game starts with very easy levels that increase in difficulty. Levels become more available with a higher completion level. Players go through a variety of levels including caves, villages, and forests. The game is designed to help children develop better motor skills through hand-eye coordination and develop better pathfinding ability.

Reader Rabbit: Jumpsmarter follows Reader Rabbit in his quest to recover all the carrots stolen by the Big Bad Wolf. The carrots are scattered throughout many environments in the Enchanted Lands, that Reader Rabbit will have to traverse in order to collect them all. Reader Rabbit will have to go through the Big Village, the Happy Forest, and the Mushroom Cave to collect all the carrots. Reader Rabbit wants to collect the carrots to share with his friend Sam the Lion.

== Reception ==
Reader Rabbit: Jumpsmarter was praised for its easy to learn platforming, being called an introduction to platforming games for younger children. It was credited for its lack of microtransactions. The look of the game was also appealing being called cute, and perfectly geared toward younger children. It received criticism for limiting its audience by being an iOS exclusive.
