= Treasure Cove! =

1992 educational video game

- Developer: The Learning Company
- Publisher: The Learning Company
- Platforms: Windows, MS-DOS, Mac
- Release: 1992
- Genre: Educational
- Mode: Single-player

Treasure Cove! is an educational video game published by The Learning Company in 1992 for MS-DOS, Windows, and Mac. It is aimed at children ages 5 to 9 and is intended to teach children reading, math, and oceanography. Treasure Cove! is the 9th installment of The Learning Company's Super Seekers games.

Treasure Cove! is a side-scrolling educational adventure game where the objective is to restore the destroyed rainbow bridge by collecting gems throughout the cove. To find the gems, the player must correctly answer simple math and reading questions asked by starfish to get clues about where they are hidden. It received generally positive reviews as well as an award at the 1993 Summer Consumer Electronics Show.

== Gameplay ==
Treasure Cove! is a side-scrolling educational adventure game. The player's objective is to plug pipes that are leaking oil into the ocean. The game takes place in the fictional Treasure Cove, which is being polluted with byproducts from experiments done by the Master of Mischief, a common antagonist in The Learning Company's Super Seekers games. The player takes on the role of the Super Seeker, whose job is to plug the pipes leaking oil and rebuild the destroyed bridge to the island by finding gems in the cove in order to stop the pollution at its source.

The cove has three separate areas that the player must visit and collect gems to plug the pipes which leak "goobies" by finding the pufferfish and dropping it on the opening. If the player hits a goobie, one light unit is taken from them. To find the pufferfish, the player must gather clues by catching orange starfish and answering their riddles. There are three clues per stage, each a single descriptive term such as "three", "swimming", or "eels". The player must then shine their flashlight on the group of animals that are described by clues to obtain the pufferfish. Shining light on a group of animals that matches two of the three clues will reveal a gem, adding points towards restoring the Rainbow Bridge. After finding gems and plugging leaks in each of the three areas, the player will surface and add the gems collected during the most recent game to the total gem count. When the player has collected a certain number of gems, the player goes up in star rank and the Rainbow Bridge is extended further. Higher star ranks means that there are more gems to find, the riddles are more difficult, and the fish which steal light move faster and are harder to avoid.

== Development ==
Treasure Cove! is one of the four games of The Learning Company's "Treasure" series along with Treasure Mountain!, Treasure Mathstorm!, and Treasure Galaxy!. The "Treasure series" is a subgroup of the company's Super Solvers series. All the games in this series are math and reading comprehension oriented educational adventure games aimed at younger children. Games in the "Treasure" series all have the same three stage gameplay format where a special object, whose location can be deduced by answering questions, is needed to reach the next stage.

== Enhanced version ==
In 1994, an enhanced and more Windows-friendly version was released on CD-ROM. In 1997 it was remade with enhanced graphics and sound.

== Reception ==
Reception

Review scores
Publication	Score
AllGame	3.5 out of 5
Abandonia	3.0 out of 5

Award
Publication	Award
Summer Consumer Electronics Show	1993 Software Showcase Honor

Treasure Cove! has received indifferent to positive reviews. Lisa Savignano of Allgame gave the game 3.5/5 stars, stating that "it's a fun game young kids will love to play". Abandonia reviewers felt the same, giving Treasure Cove! a rating of 3 out of 5. Users at Home of the Underdogs gave Treasure Cove! two thumbs up saying that it is "another enjoyable release from The Learning Company, featuring the same attractive graphics and gameplay as their previous 'Super Solvers' games" and went on to describe Treasure Cove! as "one of the best math games ever made for 5-8 year olds, bar none". On its debut, it earned Innovations 1993 Software Showcase Honors at the Summer Consumer Electronics Show.
