= Treasure Mountain! =

1990 video game

- Developer: The Learning Company
- Publisher: The Learning Company
- Platforms: MS-DOS, Windows, Classic Mac OS
- Release: NA: 1990
- Genres: Educational, adventure
- Mode: Single-player

Treasure Mountain! is an educational adventure video game published by The Learning Company in 1990 for MS-DOS, Windows, and Classic Mac OS. It teaches children aged five to nine reading, basic mathematics, and logic skills. Treasure Mountain is the third installment of the Super Seekers series.

== Plot ==
Treasure Mountain! as well as the other "Treasure" games in the Super Seekers games, take place in a magical realm called Treasureland. The game takes place on a mountain called "Treasure Mountain". Treasure MathStorm!, a later release, takes place on the same mountain.

As the game opens, the Master of Mischief, a common antagonist of The Learning Company's Super Seekers games and the counterpart of antagonist Morty Maxwell in the Super Solvers games, steals the kingdom's crown and hides all of the castle's treasures. The player takes on the role of the Super Seeker once again, whose job is to find the treasures and remove the Master of Mischief from the throne.

== Gameplay ==
The objective of Treasure Mountain! is to find the hidden treasures and return them to the chest in the castle at the top of the mountain.

The mountain consists of three levels. Players cannot climb higher until they have found the key to unlock the next level. To find the key, players must get clues about its location by answering elves' riddles. When players use a net to capture an elf carrying a scroll and answer the riddle correctly, they will receive a clue consisting of a number, shape, or description about where the key to the next level is hidden, as well as any magical coins the elf is carrying.

In the background, there are several groups of objects that have characteristics that can be matched to the clues. Players may search behind these objects by dropping a magic coin. If the objects match all three clues, the key to the next level will appear. If the objects match only two out of the three clues, one of the stolen treasures will be revealed.

After players find the key on each of the three levels of the mountain, they can enter the castle. At this point, players must climb up a maze of ladders, avoiding the Master of Mischief. When players reach the top, they deposit all treasures found into the castle's treasure chest and are given a prize - one of the treasures discovered during the game - as a reward for completing the three stages. This prize is kept on display in the clubhouse, showing how many times players have ascended the mountain. From this point, players may exit the clubhouse and start again from the bottom of the mountain.

When a certain number of treasures have been deposited into the castle's treasure chest, players will go up a star rank. At higher ranks, the game becomes more difficult, as there will be more treasures to find, harder riddles to answer, and elves that steal magical coins by using elf dust.

== Release ==
Treasure Mountain! is the first of four games in The Learning Company's "Treasure" series along with Treasure Cove!, Treasure MathStorm!, and Treasure Galaxy!. The "Treasure" series is a subgroup of the company's Super Seekers games. All the games in this series are math and reading comprehension oriented educational adventure games aimed at younger children. Games in the treasure series all have the same three stage gameplay format where a special object, whose location can be deduced by answering questions, is needed to reach the next stage.

In 1994, a remade version of the game was released on CD-ROM. In 1997 an updated version of the game was released on CD-ROM (version 2.0 Mac/2.01 Win) with better graphics.

Treasure Mountain! was later released in a software bundle package with both Treasure Cove! and Treasure Galaxy! under the name Treasure Trio!. This was one of the first software bundle packages ever sold.

== Reception ==
Reception

Review scores
Publication	Score
AllGame	4.5 out of 5
Abandonia	3.0 out of 5

Treasure Mountain! has received mediocre to positive reviews. Computer Gaming World gave the game four out of five stars, calling it "an easy-to-play, visually appealing, non-violent arcade-style game for beginners" with some reading ability. Lisa Savignano of Allgame gave the game 4.5 stars out of 5 stating that "Treasure Mountain may be somewhat repetitive, but each level will impel the kids to go onward until they finally get all 300 treasures and win the game...the game can be played over and over again".

Abandonia users gave more mediocre reviews, but said that "collecting toys and getting to the next level can be somewhat addicting".
