= Reader Rabbit: 1st Grade =

1998 educational video game

Reader Rabbit's 1st Grade
- Developer: KnowWare
- Publisher: The Learning Company
- Series: Reader Rabbit
- Platforms: Windows, Macintosh
- Release: Win/Mac: January 14, 1998
- Genre: Edutainment
- Mode: Single-player

Reader Rabbit's 1st Grade (known as Reader Rabbit Key Stage 1: Year 1 in the United Kingdom) is an educational video game, part of the Reader Rabbit series, developed by KnowWare and published by The Learning Company on January 14, 1998.

== Gameplay ==
The player participates in educational activities via the game's point-and-click interface. Each activity has a group of character(s) that teach a different activity. Completing all activities unlocks the final performance for Reader Rabbit and his friends. The game focuses on vocabulary, phonics, addition and subtraction.

== Plot ==
The Old Theatre has everything ready for a performance, but the porcupine Spike feels dissatisfied about not being the star of the show, so he takes and hides the musical instruments, costumes, scripts, props and other necessities so the performance cannot start. Reader Rabbit and his friends have only a number of hours to make preparations before tonight's performance.

== Reception ==
Reception

Award
Publication	Award
Parents' Choice	Gold Award

Common Sense Media said the game has a "nice mix of animation, song, and solid educational gaming", and declared it the "top first-grade title". Superkids deemed it "lightweight", "lively", and "entertaining". Tech With Kids thought the activities were "supportive, funny, and always upbeat", and described the learning activities as "fabulous". Edutaining Kids wrote the game was highly entertaining and positively compared it to Reader Rabbit Reading Learning System. Discovery School praised the game for its "exciting adventure storyline", "gorgeous cartoon world to explore", and "outstanding learning activities". The Washington Post said "this title makes the grade", unlike other Reader Rabbit titles. Reading Tutor said the game was a prime example of how Reader Rabbit puts educational games in the context of an interesting story line. Jeffrey Kessler who worked as a Learning Specialist for the Reader Rabbit franchise described the game as a clever mix of math, reading, art and emotion rather than a year's curriculum. During the inaugural Interactive Achievement Awards, the PC version received a nomination for "PC Edutainment Title of the Year" by the Academy of Interactive Arts & Sciences.

The Canadian Toy Testing Council gave Reader Rabbit: 1st Grade three stars on a scale of three stars, two stars, one star, novelty, not recommended.

== Sales ==
Reader Rabbit's 1st Grade was the second top-selling home education title across nine software retail chains (representing more than 40 percent of the U.S. market) in the week that ended on April 4, 1998. It was also the seventh top-selling educational titles across 13 software chains (representing 57 percent of the U.S. market), for the week ending on March 20, 1999. Reader Rabbit: 1st Grade ranked 7th on PC Data's list of Top-Selling Home Education Software for the week of April 4 to 10 in 1999.
