= Writer Rabbit =

1986 educational video game

- Apple II cover art
- Developer: The Learning Company
- Publisher: The Learning Company
- Platforms: Apple II, MS-DOS
- Release: 1986
- Genre: Educational
- Mode: Single-player

Reader Rabbit 3
- Developer: The Learning Company
- Publisher: The Learning Company
- Platforms: Original: MS-DOS; Deluxe: Windows, Macintosh
- Release: 1993: Original; 1994: Deluxe
- Genre: Educational
- Mode: Single-player

Writer Rabbit is a 1986 educational video game, part of the Reader Rabbit franchise. It was remade as Reader Rabbit 3 for MS-DOS compatible operating systems in 1993, then re-released for Microsoft Windows and Macintosh in 1994 under the title Reader Rabbit 3 Deluxe!.

The Project RIMES 2000 project Annotated Bibliography of Computer Software for Teaching Early Reading and Spelling identified Reader Rabbit 3 as: "Reader Rabbit 3 (formally [sic] known as Writer Rabbit)".

Many of its features were "implemented in response to requests made by children, teachers, and parents".

== Gameplay ==
The early education program contains minigames and activities in a series of interactive screens that teach players about the parts of sentences, including the "who, what, where, when, and why". Fill-in-the-black sentences are one of the main devices used.

The game contains over 200 different news stories to work from. The Deluxe version contains 20 different digitized voices that add to the dramatization to the game.

The Writer Rabbit version contains six minigames:

1. Icecream Game: Players indicate which sentence part appears at the top of the screen.
2. The Cake Games (1, 2, and 3): Match sentence parts.
3. Juice Game: Players complete sentences
4. Silly Story Party: Players can write stories from scratch or from a list of story fragments.

The Reader Rabbit 3 version is made up of five different activities, that teach players the structure of the English language. The activities are:

1. What's the Scoop? / Who? What? When? - the player must determine correctly whether the topic of a sentence is a what, a where, a when, or a who. It is similar to Icecream Game.
2. Clue Hounds / Get the Scoop + Crack the Case - the player must locate the what, where, when, and who parts of story sentences. After completing the sentences, the player must pick a character associated with the story.
3. Sneak Peek / Rave Reviews - the player has to choose a sentence that contains the three elements who/what, did what and where.
4. Ed Words / Write Right - the player must fill in the blanks of a paragraph with the three elements do what, where and when.
5. Printing Press - the player is given the option to physically print out the news story.

== Plot ==
Writer Rabbit packaged their minigames into a party theme, with the basic plot being that solving the puzzles will help the protagonist Writer Rabbit prepare for an upcoming party. Meanwhile, in the Reader Rabbit 3 version, essentially the same mini-games are wrapped up in a new story the game sees series protagonist Reader Rabbit join the Daily Skywriter, the daily newspaper for his hometown Wordville. He has to identify the right information to put into his stories. The game was designed to build critical reading skills for grades two to four, by applying speech rules to a real-world scenario.

== Reception ==
PC Mag noted positive responses from playtesters and thought this was indicative that the Writer Rabbit was effective as an education tool behind the facade of a game. Chicago Sun-Times thought the game was as effective for writing as Reader Rabbit had been for reading; the newspaper gave the game a rating of 10.0 and recommended the software for 1989 holiday gifts. PC Mag reviewer Charles Taft wrote that Reader Rabbit 3 was "fun to play" while praising its replayability (four levels of difficulty and multiple stories), as well as its "delightful" animations. The game was regarded as a winner in the book "Only the Best: The Annual Guide to the Highest-Rated Educational Software/Multimedia".
