= Teri Perl =

American mathematics educator

- Born: November 19, 1926 (age 99); New York City, New York
- Known for: co-founded The Learning Company

Academic background
- Education: Brooklyn College; San Jose State University; Stanford University
- Thesis: Discriminating Factors and Sex Differences in Electing Mathematics (1979)

Academic work
- Discipline: Mathematics education

Teri Perl (born November 19, 1926) is an American mathematics educator, author of mathematics resource books, and a co-founder of The Learning Company.

== Education and career ==
Perl was born in New York City, New York. In 1947, she received a bachelor's degree in economics from Brooklyn College in New York. She did post-baccalaureate work at San Jose State University in California and earned a secondary mathematics teaching credential there in 1969. While doing substitute teaching in the San Francisco Bay Area, Perl discovered that there weren't adequate resources for substitute teachers. She began a long-distance collaboration with Miriam K. Freedman to produce A Sourcebook for Substitutes and Other Teachers. Freedman developed the material for teachers of English, foreign languages, and social science and Perl for teachers of mathematics and science. Perl was a mathematics consultant and resource teacher at Ventura Elementary School in Palo Alto, California in the 1970s.

After her youngest child was in high school, Perl attended Stanford University in Palo Alto, California and obtained a Ph.D. in mathematics education in 1979. The title of her dissertation was "Discriminating Factors and Sex Differences in Electing Mathematics". From 1971 to 1979, while working on her doctorate at Stanford, Perl taught part-time at San Francisco State University.

In 1980, Perl, Ann McCormick, Leslie Grimm, and Warren Robinett founded The Learning Company (TLC), an educational software company that developed grade-based learning software, as well as edutainment games and productivity tools. Perl was the content designer for TLC's Math Rabbit. She was responsible for writing users'/teachers' guides to accompany several software packages produced by TLC. In 1995, TLC was taken over by SoftKey, who changed their name to The Learning Company. After several sales, The Learning Company brand was used by Houghton Mifflin Harcourt through 2018.

In 1974, Perl, together with a group of San Francisco Bay area women, founded the Math/Science Network to encourage and inspire middle and high school girls to pursue careers in STEM. The network was rebranded as the Expanding Your Horizons (EYH) Network in 1982 when EYH obtained nonprofit status. The MSN/EYH developed a one-day workshop for middle and high school girls with hands-on workshops and interactions with women in STEM careers. Perl served as president of the EYH Network from 1999 to 2007. EYH has run over 80 Career Days, with up to 25,000 girls participating each year. In 2010, the EYH Network was honored by the National Science Board with their Public Service Award "for its decades-long commitment to the early development of interest in mathematics and science among young women, making significant strides toward its goal to develop a pool of qualified women to undertake careers in mathematics, science and engineering."

In March 1979, Perl's book Math Equals: Biographies of Women Mathematicians + Related Activities received a very positive review by the American Library Association's publication Choice.

"An excellent, documented historical account of contributions made by somen interested in mathematics presented in a most unusual and readable format. The attention of a reader in mathematics is captivated immediately..."

In 2005, GirlSource honored Perl with its WAVE (Women of Achievement, Vision and Excellence) award. In 2022 she became a fellow of the Association for Women in Mathematics, "For amazing and tireless efforts over five decades to promote women in mathematics and related fields; particularly, for co-founding what we now know as Expanding Your Horizons, her biographies of women mathematicians, and her influential role in The Learning Company, which have together inspired generations of women and girls."

== Selected publications ==
- Perl, Teri (February 1978). Math Equals: Biographies of Women Mathematicians + Related Activities. Addison Wesley Innovative Series. Menlo Park, CA: Addison-Wesley. p. 250. ISBN 978-0201057096.
- Morrow, Charlene; Perl, Teri, eds. (May 30, 1998). Notable Women in Mathematics: A Biographical Dictionary. Westport, CT: Greenwood. p. 320. ISBN 978-0313291319.
  - Book review: Forgasz, Helen (1999). "The Lives and Contributions of Women Mathematicians and Educators". Mathematics Education Research Journal. 11 (2): 154–155. Bibcode:1999MEdRJ..11..154F. doi:10.1007/BF03217068. S2CID 178797322.
- Freedman, Miriam K.; Perl, Teri (1974). A Sourcebook for Substitutes and Other Teachers. Parsippany, NJ: Dale Seymour Publications/Pearson Learning. ISBN 978-0201057867.
- Perl, Teri Hoch (1979). "The Ladies' Diary or Woman's Almanack". Historia Mathematica. 6 (1): 36–53. doi:10.1016/0315-0860(79)90103-4. MR 0518839.
