= Ragnorium =

2022 video game

- Developer(s): Vitali Kirpu
- Publisher(s): Devolver Digital
- Director(s): Vitali Kirpu
- Platform(s): Windows
- Release: 25 April 2022
- Genre(s): Construction and management simulation
- Mode(s): Single-player

Ragnorium is a 2022 construction and management simulation video game developed by Finnish developer Vitali Kirpu and published by Devolver Digital. The game entered early access in 2020 and was officially released on Windows on 25 April 2022. The game is set in an alternative universe where space exploration has been privatized leading to clone colonists becoming a commodity.

== Gameplay ==
Ragnorium is a fantasy colony simulator game where the player is tasked with creating and maintaining a self-sustaining colony on various planets with harsh conditions, while also ensuring that their settlement is strong enough to survive the oncoming Holy Crusade led by a Sentient Machine. The player and their clones will arrive on a planet where they are able to land their ship and begin the steps to colonize the planet, they will need to collect vital resources such as food and water and begin to build structures. The game challenges the player to explore planets through dispatch missions and evolve their colonies in order to reach new milestones. By completing these activities the colonies are able to progress through new technological eras further enhancing their settlements. With the release of Ragnorium 1.0 players have been provided with a wider variety of colonist types, resources, items, six new planet maps, additional characters and boss battles.

The game has various levels of difficulty such as Zenlike mode and Hardcore mode. The Zenlike difficulty does not feature dynamic events providing players with a more forgiving and relaxing experience, as they have a larger window of time to prepare for the invasion of the Holy Crusade and the rising difficulty. However Hardcore mode provides the player with an unforgiving and relentless experience, increasing the harsh environments of the planets and the difficulty of the Holy Crusade.

== Development ==
Ragnorium entered early access on Steam on 16 September 2020 with the period being planned for 12–24 months. Ragnorium's developer Vitali Kirpu actively engaged in feedback from early access users to help improve and develop the game, before officially releasing the game on 25 April 2022.

Vitali Kirpu is a Finnish developer who formerly worked on Pixel Piracy, an indie strategy video game and simulator that launched worldwide on April 23, 2015.
