= Rebel Trucker =

2003 video game

Rebel Trucker Cajun Blood Money
- Developer(s): 3 Romans
- Publisher(s): Global Star Software
- Platform(s): Microsoft Windows
- Release: NA: November 25, 2003
- Genre(s): Racing, Simulation
- Mode(s): Single player

Rebel Trucker : Cajun Blood Money is a truck racing simulator for Windows produced by American studio 3 Romans and published by Global Star Software.

== Premise ==
The game follows the tale of an unemployed man named Keri Thibiodeaux who needs a job, and becomes a truck driver. The man then gets a job with the mafia and the aim of the game is to complete particular missions for this rebel truck company around New Orleans and the surrounding areas.

== Features ==
• Training and certification levels where the player learns how to drive

• A variety of story-based missions to play

• Bonus mini games like loading dock and parking tests

• 10 multi-objective racing based missions

• An assortment of rigs to drive including flatbeds, car carriers, sleepers and tankers

• Run contraband for the Louisiana underworld or join federal agents and help shut them down

• Commercial trucker mode lets you drive highways, logging gas and lodging, and trying to meet legal and weight compliance laws

• Over 100 miles of real city roads and highways, with some noticeable landmarks around New Orleans

• 3 levels of difficulty.

== Reception ==
Upon its release, Rebel Trucker received quite a negative reception from a lot of reviewers, down to its stability issues and 'fun factor'

-GameSpot : 1.8/10 "Rebel Trucker is a huge mess of a game"

-Computer Games Magazine: 4/10

== Sources ==
http://www.rottentomatoes.com https://web.archive.org/web/20071021014425/http://uk.gamespot.com/ http://www.gamerankings.com
