= Rubies of Eventide =

2003 video game

- Developer: Mnemosyne, LLC (a.k.a. Cyber Warrior, Inc.)
- Publisher: Mnemosyne, LLC (a.k.a. Cyber Warrior, Inc.)
- Platform: Microsoft Windows
- Release: June 2003
- Genre: Fantasy MMORPG
- Mode: Multiplayer

Rubies of Eventide was a free to play (donation-funded) massively multiplayer online role-playing game previously published by American studio Mnemosyne, LLC. Rubies of Eventide is set in the medieval fantasy world of Vormis represented by a 3D world. The game launched in June 2003, shut down and restarted and after 6 years, ceased operation in August 2009.

== History ==
CyberWarrior, Inc. launched Rubies of Eventide on 2 June 2003 as a paid service. Citing low subscription rates, CyberWarrior announced that the game would cease operations in December, 2003 but later managed to secure additional funding for some months. Later, two former CyberWarrior developers, together with the founder of the game, set up a private server to play the game with close friends and relatives, but found that some hardcore fans managed to hook themselves to their connection. After leasing the game to Mnemosyne, LLC. in 2004, the game continued to operate on a donation-based model. Players were able to start and play accounts for free (with limited server space), while patrons gain priority in game access during peak usage, and certain in-game benefits.
