= Reassembly (video game) =

2015 video game

- Developer: Anisoptera Games
- Designer: Arthur Danskin
- Platforms: Microsoft Windows; Mac OS; Linux
- Release: November 25, 2014 (early access) February 19, 2015 (full release)
- Genres: Strategy, shooter, simulation
- Mode: Single-player

Reassembly is a 2D open world space shooter PC game, created by video game developer Anisoptera Games. The game is available on Steam or from the developer's website via Humble Widget. Native versions are available for Microsoft Windows, Mac OS, and Linux. It was released on February 19, 2015.

== Gameplay ==
A player's ship fights a Battle Nurse from the Red faction

=== Main game ===
Players build their ships out of various geometric pieces, including hull, armor, thrusters, weapons, shield projectors, and various other functional components. Each component gives a unique attribute or ability to the ship. Reassembly's creative, modular ship building has been compared to playing with Lego. The in-game world is a single large open "galaxy", populated with rival factions. Players progress through the game by collecting resources, building a fleet, capturing territory, and activating damaged space stations.

=== Tournaments ===
In tournament mode, players can select ships that they have created or downloaded from other players, and pit them against each other in pool mode or bracket mode. The ships in tournament mode are not controlled by the player, rather, the AI decides how to attack and defend depending on how the ships have been designed and the behavior of the opponents they are facing. Several larger online tournaments have been organized and posted on YouTube and/or streamed on Twitch as well as a series of official tournaments hosted by the developer, Arthur Danskin.

== Development ==
=== Initial development ===
During the alpha testing the game was originally being developed under the name Gamma Void. Later in development, the developer of the game decided to change the name to Reassembly. The new name was chosen for the reason that it clearly states an important feature of the game, when a ship is damaged, it is reassembled by tractor beaming in any nearby transients parts that are floating around, and rebuilding ships based on the blueprint design created by the player on the fleet configuration screen. A crowdfunding campaign on Kickstarter has raised about $35,308 to further contributes to the effort on the development of the game.

=== Further development and modding support ===
In April 2015, developer Arthur Danskin announced the ability to add modding support into the game. This feature allowed players to create and publish their own custom factions, ships, and features. Modding support was available in the "2nd time Beta testing" for the game on Steam, where users who had bought the game had an option to download and test the "second Beta".
