= Operation Neptune (video game) =

1991 video game

- Operation Neptune's title screen
- Developer: The Learning Company
- Publisher: The Learning Company
- Platforms: MS-DOS, Windows, Macintosh
- Release: NA: 1991
- Genre: Educational
- Mode: Single-player

Operation Neptune is an educational video game released in 1991 by The Learning Company. The goal of the game is to guide a small submarine through a variety of undersea caverns, collecting pieces of a ruined space capsule. Like other games by The Learning Company, Operation Neptune is educational and is intended for players age nine to fourteen (grades three through ten). It was released as part of the Super Solvers series for a time.

== Plot ==
A team of astronauts and scientists have begun a secret research project on a distant planet. The research team's results were sent back to Earth on the "Galaxy space capsule", which malfunctioned, crashed into the ocean, and broke into many pieces. The capsule contained several data canisters, each with snippets of the scientists' story, revealed as the game progresses and data canisters are found. It also had toxic chemicals that began leaking, threatening sea life. A mission, Operation Neptune, was sent to recover the pieces.

== Gameplay ==
The game consists of two campaigns, called Voyager Game and Expert Game; the player selects one when creating a new save file. In each campaign, the player must complete sixteen levels, called Sectors, which are distributed across five Zones: Dragon Reef, Fossil Trench, Limestone Ridge, Sea Forest, and Hammerhead.

=== Piloting the Neptune ===
In each Sector, the player must use the arrow keys to pilot a submarine (the Neptune) through maze-like passages, collect every data capsule, and reach the supply station at the end. The box cover illustration rendered by Marc Ericksen depicts the Neptune submarine recovery vehicle hovering above the basin of Fossil Trench recovering glowing toxic data capsules.

Each Sector comprises approximately a dozen screens, displayed in flip-screen fashion. Many screens are populated by hostile sea creatures and non-living hazards which deal damage to the submarine on contact. To avoid damage, the player must carefully pilot the Neptune around these dangers. Typically, hostile creatures patrol paths and perform actions on a set cycle; players are expected to stop and study creature movement patterns for a few moments before attempting to pass by them. However, some creatures have complex patterns designed to punish impatient players, initially appearing to follow very simple patrol paths but suddenly changing course after a few cycles. Other creatures may react to the player's movements, changing their routine in response to the Neptune entering invisible regions on the screen. Creatures that are identical in appearance can potentially have radically different behaviors.

The player can press the spacebar to fire an ink pellet in a straight line from the Neptune's nose. If an ink pellet makes contact with a hostile creature, that creature is stunned and rendered harmless for a brief window of time, granting the player an opportunity to escape a tricky situation. Ink pellets are a limited resource, with only 21 pieces of ammunition allotted per Sector. In the Final Sector of each campaign, all hostile creatures are either immune to ink pellets or only affected for an extremely brief period of time.

=== Solving problems ===
The game will frequently break away from the action-oriented gameplay to present the player with math problems to solve. In problem-solving mode, the game employs a distinctly different interface, presenting text on one side of the screen and an illustration on the other. The math challenge takes the form of a word problem, and it is up to the player to determine the order of operations involved and arrive at the correct solution. Inputting an incorrect solution causes the player to lose Oxygen. If the Neptune survives the problem, the game then returns to action-game mode, resuming precisely where the player left off.

Each Sector contains three invisible and unavoidable trigger points; when the Neptune crosses one of these trigger points, a chime plays and a beacon on the Neptune flashes. These trigger points are generally placed a safe distance away from enemies and hazards, so that the player will not be distracted during a difficult maneuver. After a few seconds, the game switches to problem-solving mode, and presents a word problem randomly selected from a set of problems appropriate for the current difficulty setting. The word problems are themed after situations that might concern a submarine pilot on a scientific expedition.

==== Types of math problems ====
- Ballast Control Panel: Given a list of ten numbers and a sum S, the player must choose any combination of numbers from the list that add up exactly to S. This is framed in-story as the Neptune pilot needing to adjust the ballast in order to control the submarine's ascent or descent rate. In Voyager Game, the player typically selects from a list of numbers typically found in denominations of United States coin money (i.e. 1, 5, 10, 25). In Expert Game, the player typically selects from a list of powers of two (e.g. 1, 2, 4, 8, 16).
- Sonar: The Neptune pilot is informed of an upcoming obstacle. Given the obstacle's current distance and rate of approach, the player must calculate the time to reach the obstacle, in the requested unit of time (either hours or minutes).
- Search Grid: Given a partially filled grid, the player is asked to calculate the area of either the shaded or unshaded region.
- Toxicity Graph: Given a bar chart, the player is asked to interpret two values and calculate the difference. This is framed in-story as the surface ship requesting data on the ecological impact of the Galaxy space capsule.
- Scale: This problem may occur when the Neptune acquires certain normal capsule pieces. The player must round the exact mass to a less precise value.
- Distance Traveled Chart: Given the average speed of the Neptune and a duration of time, the player must calculate the total distance traveled.
- Window Crack: This problem may occur when the Neptune travels through certain tight corridors. In-story, the Neptune's window has cracked, and the exact length of the crack must be accurately reported in order for the window to be replaced at the next supply station. The game displays a black line aligned alongside a ruler, and the player must determine the length of the black line. In later versions of this problem, the player is expected to report the length as a mixed number.
- Water Tank: In this problem's framing, the Neptune has a limited freshwater supply, and will not be able to replenish it at the next supply station. Given a volume of freshwater and a rate of usage per day, the player must calculate the number of days that the Neptune's pilot can survive on the current supply.
- Temperature: In-story, a malfunction in the Neptune's onboard battery has reduced its electrical output, and the pilot must act to both conserve energy and preserve their food supply. The player must read an on-screen thermometer and calculate the appropriate temperature adjustment as requested in the problem.
- Clock: The game shows an analog clock which displays the time in military format. The player must calculate either a time or duration, depending on what the problem requests.
- Power Supply: The game displays a line chart, where the X-axis represents the Neptune's energy usage per hour and the Y-axis represents the Neptune's speed. Given that the Neptune will travel at S speed for T hours, the player must read the chart, determine the Neptune's energy usage per hour based on S, then multiply by T hours to calculate the Neptune's estimated energy usage over that duration.
- Radio-Telephone Signals: In-story, the Neptune is required to communicate with the surface ship at regular intervals. Given that the surface ship expects N contacts per hour, the player must calculate the duration of the intervals in between contacts.
- Oil Supply: Given a maximum oil supply and a gauge which displays remaining oil supply in ten equal increments, the player must read the gauge and accurately report the Neptune's remaining oil supply.
- Capsule Piece Inventory: In this problem, the player must calculate the sum of five individual weights listed in ounces, and report the total weight in pounds. The player is expected to use a calculator to accomplish this task.
- Speed Graph: Given a bar chart, the player is asked to interpret six values and calculate the arithmetic mean of those values.
- Navigation Chart: Given a latitude-longitude chart with two markers, the player must calculate the latitudinal or longitudinal difference of those markers in degrees. In-story, the supply ship is requesting the Neptune's relative distance from the next supply station.
- Speed Indicator: The game displays a speedometer. The player must read the speedometer and input a new speed as requested by the problem. For example, the Neptune is traveling at 18 MPH, and the problem requests that the pilot reduce their speed by 1/3 of the current value; in this case the player must input a value of 12.
- Toxicity Level Graph: Not to be confused with the similarly-themed Toxicity Graph problem. In this problem, the game displays a line chart, where the X-axis represents time (with intervals marked in military time), and the Y-axis represents toxicity in PPM, with one Y-value being marked as "Normal". The player must read the graph and accurately report the number of minutes for which the region's toxicity was above "Normal".
- Depth Gauge: The game displays a graphic indicating the Neptune's depth in feet, and the player must convert this reading into fathoms. The problem initially hides the conversion method from the player; after one wrong answer, the game reveals that 6 feet = 1 fathom.
- Water Pressure: The game displays a line chart, where the X-axis is the Neptune's depth in feet and the Y-axis is the water pressure in PSI. Given a depth in feet, the player must use the chart to determine the current water pressure.
- Data Canister: In every Sector, the player must collect one data canister. Upon making contact with the canister, the game instantly transitions to problem-solving mode. All data canister problems feature an arithmetic or geometric sequence five numbers long, with one of the numbers in the sequence removed; the player must calculate the missing number. Upon completing the sequence (or failing twice with enough surplus Oxygen), the player is rewarded with one part of a 15-part story. These data canisters are often found in hazardous locations, so the player must be prepared to move the Neptune to safety as soon as they are finished interacting with them.
- Combination Lock: At the end of every Sector is a supply station, which the player can only access by first obtaining all collectible items in that Sector. When the Neptune touches the supply station's door with all items collected, the game instantly transitions to problem-solving mode. All supply station problems feature a combination lock which serves as a timing-based math puzzle. The game first rotates the inner lock to generate an arithmetic equation; the outer lock then begins to rotate, and the player must stop the lock at the right time, when the correct answer lines up with the arrow. The player is presented with two arithmetic equations, and if the Neptune survives through both, the player successfully completes the Sector.

The Final Sector features no math problems.

=== Managing oxygen ===
At the start of a new game, the Neptune has four Oxygen units (health) and two Oxygen Tanks (lives). If the Neptune runs out of Oxygen at any point, the Neptune is destroyed. When this happens, if the player has at least one Oxygen Tank available, they are sent back to the last checkpoint. Otherwise, the player loses all progress made in the current Sector, the Neptune is sent back to the start of the current Sector, all collectible items are returned to their original positions, and all previously solved math problems have to be solved again.

Touching any enemy or hazard causes the Neptune to lose one Oxygen unit. When Oxygen is lost in this way, if the Neptune still has Oxygen remaining, the Neptune is granted temporary invulnerability, allowing them to escape immediate danger and prevent further loss of Oxygen.

Giving an incorrect answer while in problem-solving mode also costs one Oxygen unit. While in problem-solving mode, if the Neptune has at least three Oxygen units to start with, and gives two incorrect answers, the game will display the correct solution to the problem and allow the player to continue as though the problem had been solved normally.

In most Sectors, a dolphin named Zoom appears in one of the screens. If the Neptune touches Zoom, one of two beneficial effects happen: either the Neptune's Oxygen is restored to full, or (if the Neptune currently has full Oxygen) the Neptune gets one extra Tank. The player is limited to six Tanks. In many cases, when the player reaches the screen where Zoom is located, Zoom will immediately attempt to swim off-screen, and the player must catch him before he escapes; if Zoom escapes the player this way, he will not respawn unless the player loses a Tank or reloads the game. Zoom does not appear in the Third Sector of Fossil Trench, nor the Final Sector.

In the Final Sector, all enemies and hazards destroy the Neptune in one hit, and there are no checkpoints.

=== Differences between campaigns ===
While the Neptune travels through the same five zones in each campaign, the level layouts found in Expert Game are quite different from those found in the Voyager Game. In the Expert Game, hazards are placed in more dangerous arrangements, the enemies move in trickier patterns and have new attacks, and some screens feature strong ocean currents which push and pull the Neptune in unexpected and undesirable ways.

In the Voyager Game, the Final Sector features four slow but large sea creatures which destroy the Neptune in a single hit; ink pellets are completely ineffective against them. In the Expert Game, the stage is filled with many fast and aggressive sharks; ink pellets only stun these sharks for a fraction of a second, but this can be used to alter their patrol patterns and make screens safer to cross.
