= Reader Rabbit Preschool: Sparkle Star Rescue =

2001 educational video game

- Cover art
- Developer: The Learning Company
- Publisher: The Learning Company
- Series: Reader Rabbit
- Platforms: Mac OS X, Windows, Wii
- Release: June 27, 2001
- Genre: Educational
- Mode: Single-player

Reader Rabbit Preschool: Sparkle Star Rescue is a game in the Reader Rabbit series by The Learning Company. The title was released in 2001. The game is recommended for ages 3–6. The game teaches "shape and size recognition, letter recognition and listening", among other skills, including maths-related ones. The game was also released for the Nintendo Wii by Graffiti Entertainment, simply titled Reader Rabbit Preschool.

== Plot ==
Somewhere in the night sky, Reader Rabbit's Dreamship is being pursued by the Pirats in their ship, but manage to lose them. Reader and his friends notice that the stars in the sky are disappearing. They are met by a firefly named Spark who tells them that the crater of Mount Brill in Sparkalot is blocked by a crashed Pirat ship. With Mount Brill blocked, new stars cannot appear in the sky. In order to remove the Pirat ship, Reader and Sam have to collect brillites.

== Development ==
Artist Fred Dinada aided by Carla Cruttendan created new colourful characters for the game the firefly Spark and the glowworm Sparklers. Many of Fred's sketches did not make it into the game and ended up becoming artwork in his next project Starflyers.

== Critical reception ==
Tech With Kids said the game "cleverly interweaves innovative activities into an interesting storyline". Superkids wrote that the game was a "wonderfully designed program". Edutaining Kids praised the "fun, bright graphics", though said that it was the "weakest title of the bunch" of Reader Rabbit games they reviewed. New Straight Times commended the game for its animation and songs.
