= Gizmos & Gadgets! =

1993 video game

Super Solvers: Gizmos & Gadgets
- Cover art
- Developer: The Learning Company
- Publisher: The Learning Company
- Platforms: MS-DOS, Macintosh
- Release: NA: 1993
- Genres: Platform; Puzzle; Racing
- Mode: Single-player

Gizmos & Gadgets is an educational science video game designed by The Learning Company. It is intended to teach children between the ages of 7 and 12 introductory mechanics, namely simple machines, magnets, basic electronics, and forms of energy. The original game is compatible with computers running DOS 3.3 or higher and a later CD release added Windows 95 and Macintosh compatibility. A popular game through 1997, The Learning Company, then incorporated with Broderbund, discontinued Gizmos & Gadgets in 1998. Riverdeep eventually obtained the rights and re-released it in some of the "Adventure Workshop" collections.

== Gameplay ==
The objective of the game is to win 15 races in different vehicles against Morty Maxwell at the Shady Glen Technology Center. This is done by moving the Super Solver (who has no facial features) around a series of warehouses to collect vehicle parts by solving puzzles involving principles of physics.

There are 15 races; five races in each of three categories, automotive, alternative energy, and aircraft. The races get progressively harder and the vehicles more complex as the player nears the fifth race in each category.

== Characters ==
- Super Solver is the user-controlled main character. The user moves the Super Solver around warehouses collecting parts that are used to build the vehicles. The Super Solver goes by the user's name. In the 1997 version, the Super Solver has a voice, which is not set by the user.
- Morty Maxwell – the game's antagonist, he battles the Super Solver in all 15 races.
- Cyberchimps – Morty's henchmen, they hang around the warehouse and if the player runs into them they steal one of the parts. The only way to stop them is to throw bananas at them, causing them to sleep and relinquish any part(s) they have taken.

== Warehouse ==
The warehouse where the parts are kept is a maze-like building through which the player must navigate. There are multiple levels and the only ways to travel between them are to be blown by vents, jump off springboards, or jump off trampolines (to move up) or to walk off a ledge (to move down). There is also a "front" (where the player can see the whole warehouse and few boxes are generally visible) and a "back" (which is a small portion of the front where the majority of boxes are). They are separated by doors. Doors begin locked and can only be unlocked by solving a science-related puzzle. Once unlocked the player can move back and forth freely through that door, but the only way to reach the majority of the warehouse is through the "front", although most boxes are on the "back" the player must unlock many, if not most of the doors.

== Educational value ==
In solving the puzzles, players learn about science and mathematical principles, including:

- Balance – balancing a scale using different weights and distances.
- Electricity – constructing various types of series and parallel circuits.
- Energy – matching activities to energy types: chemical, electrical, kinetic, nuclear, potential, light, heat, and mechanical.
- Force – propelling various sized objects into a flashing hole (depending on ramp, gravity and/or friction).
- Gears – constructing machines using gears of various sizes.
- Magnetics – constructing various north–south pole patterns.
- Machines – building common objects out of simple machine pieces.

In building vehicles, players learn about good, better and best principles. For example, that a rounded nose on a car is more aerodynamic and faster than a flat nose, and a pointed nose is better still.

== Reception ==
Allgame gave the game a rating of 4.5 stars out of 5. It said the graphics were "excellent, if cartoony", and that the sound was "loud and clear" and sometimes humorous. It added that the game was "very enjoyable", with substantial replay value. It also noted that "the User's Guide is huge and has plenty of tips to help players solve problems".

Biased Video Gamer Blog said: "If you have to play only one of the Super Solver games, and I am assuming you are an adult, I would probably suggest Super Solvers: Gizmos and Gadgets because it targets the middle school audience". He described it as "a game that can suck your time away".
