= Radiation Island =

2015 video game

- Developer: Atypical Games
- Publisher: Atypical Games
- Platforms: iOS; Nintendo Switch; Microsoft Windows; Android; MacOS
- Release: iOS/MacOS: WW: January 29, 2015; Microsoft Windows/Android: WW: November 29, 2016; Nintendo Switch: WW: February 22, 2018; JP: June 21, 2018
- Genres: Action-adventure, survival
- Modes: Single-player, multiplayer

Radiation Island is an action-adventure and survival game by California-based developer Atypical Games. It was initially released on iOS and MacOS on January 29, 2015, and later also published on Microsoft Windows and Android on November 29, 2016, as well as Nintendo Switch on February 22, 2018. Gameplay in Radiation Island features elements of exploration, crafting, combat, and survival. Also multiplayer can be unlocked after completing the game.

== Reception ==
The mobile version of the game received generally positive reviews from critics, garnering a Metacritic score of 79/100 based on 8 reviews. It was praised for its visuals, immersive gameplay, creative mechanics, and lack of in-app purchases, but criticized for poor AI pathfinding and a repetitive gameplay loop. The Nintendo Switch version of the game received worse reviews in comparison, holding a Metacritic score of 54/100 based on 7 reviews.
