= Reader Rabbit Playtime for Baby =

1999 educational video game

- Developer: Mattel Interactive
- Publisher: The Learning Company
- Series: Reader Rabbit
- Platforms: Windows, Macintosh
- Release: Win/Mac: July 6, 1999
- Genre: Edutainment
- Mode: Single-player

Reader Rabbit Playtime for Baby is an educational video game, part of the Reader Rabbit series, developed by Mattel Interactive and published by The Learning Company in 1999. The game was designed for children aged 9 to 24 months as a software called "Lapware". The game also comes with an extra CD containing songs.

== Plot ==
Mat the Mouse comes to visit Reader Rabbit at his house. During a game of hide and seek, Mat ducks into a toy chest where Reader can't find her and decides to play around with the games inside.

== Gameplay ==
The game consists of ten activities:

- Hide & Seek Animals
- Faces and Feelings
- Peek-a-Boo Bubbles
- Kaleidoscope Symphony
- Musical Drawers
- My Storybook
- Shape Slide
- Rhyme Time
- Discovery House
- Mat Says

The program also incorporates the use of a microphone and a printer. No computer skills are required to play and there are no right or wrong answers in the activities. Pressing any key on the keyboard or any mouse movement and clicking always gives a response.

== Development ==
=== Research ===
Mattel Interactive manager, Toby Levenson did extensive research in infant development and learning by observing child and parental interaction. To ensure the program was appropriate, every action made by mouse caused something to happen on screen as well the implementation of large pictures, visible motions, catchy music and bright colors.

=== Educational goals ===
The game was designed to allow infants to interact with a computer without too much work, piquing their curiosity and stimulating them all the while forming a bond with parents. Implemented in the game were the elements of creativity, visual patterning and basic computer skills. Potentially the game could promote a baby's speech, language, growth, emotional development, social development and physical development.
