= Reader Rabbit Kindergarten =

1997 education video game

- Developer: The Learning Company
- Publisher: The Learning Company
- Series: Reader Rabbit
- Platforms: Windows, Macintosh
- Release: Win/Mac: July 9, 1997
- Genre: Edutainment
- Mode: Single-player

Reader Rabbit Kindergarten is a video game within the edutainment series Reader Rabbit, published by The Learning Company in July 1997.

== Gameplay ==
Designed for ages 4–6, the plot of the game sees the player help Reader Rabbit and Mat the Mouse collect resources for a large campfire party at Camp Happy Tales. The game is designed to teach children skills such as mathematics, phonics, reading, and listening. The press release said the game "incorporates lively music, vivid graphics and charming characters to encourage imaginative learning". The game featured 16-bit color and sound.

== Commercial performance ==
Reader Rabbit Kindergarten was the 8th top-selling educational software across nine retail chains (representing more than 40 percent of the U.S. market) in the week ending on January 10, 1998. A March article said the game finished at number 14 in a ranking of the ranking of best-selling educational software. The game was the 6th op-selling home-education software across 13 software retail chains (representing more than 57 percent of the U.S. market) for the week ending on May 1. The game was the 4th top-selling educational title across 13 computer software retail chains (representing 53 percent of the U.S. market) for the week that ending on October 31. Across October, the game was the second top educational software programs for PCs, after The American Girls Premiere. The game was the 4th best-selling product by dollars in the education category across November, and the 5th in December.

== Critical reception ==
Computer Shopper praised the graphics, animation, and characters, and compared the "entertaining and compelling" game to Creative Wonders title Get Set for Kindergarten Deluxe. Superkids said the game had "engaging animation" and "structured yet entertaining activities".
