= CD-ROM Today =

American magazine (1993–1996)

- October 1994 issue of CD-ROM Today
- Editor-in-Chief: Brad Dosland
- Staff writers: Various
- Categories: Computing, multimedia
- Frequency: Once every other month, later monthly
- Publisher: Matt Firme
- First issue: early 1993
- Final issue Number: July 1996; 25
- Company: Imagine Publishing
- Country: United States
- Based in: Brisbane, California
- Language: English
- ISSN: 1069-4099

CD-ROM Today was an American magazine targeted at computer users. Published from 1993 to 1996 by Imagine Publishing (now Future US), the magazine was initially issued once every other month, before becoming a monthly. Each issue included software and hardware reviews, as well as a CD containing fonts, video and text files, system updaters, freeware and shareware and demo versions of commercial software. Products were included for both Macintosh and Windows PC.

CD-ROM Today was the highest-selling review magazine for both Macintosh and PC users in 1996. In 1996, after four seasonal and 25 numbered issues, the magazine was discontinued, with two newer publications replacing it: MacAddict for Macintosh users, and boot for Windows users. Both magazines were first issued in August 1996 and have since been renamed MacLife and Maximum PC, respectively.
