= The Learning Company =

American educational software company

- Corporate logo used from September 18, 1995 to March 7, 2007
- Type: Public
- Traded as: NYSE: TLC
- Founded: May 8, 1980; 46 years ago (as The Learning Co.); Palo Alto, California, U.S.
- Founders: Ann McCormick; Leslie Grimm; Teri Perl; Warren Robinett
- Defunct: April 2018; 8 years ago
- Fate: Acquired by SoftKey
- Headquarters: Boston, Massachusetts, U.S.
- Products: Educational games
- Website: www.hmhco.com

The Learning Company (TLC) was an American educational software company founded in 1980 in Palo Alto, California and headquartered in Fremont, California. The company produced a grade-based line of learning software, edutainment games, and productivity tools. Its titles included the flagship series Reader Rabbit, for preschoolers through second graders, and The ClueFinders, for more advanced students. The company was also known for publishing licensed educational titles featuring characters from animated series such as Arthur, Scooby-Doo, Cyberchase, Hamtaro, The Powerpuff Girls, SpongeBob SquarePants, Caillou, Jay Jay the Jet Plane, Zoboomafoo, and Sesame Street.

In December 1995, the company was acquired by SoftKey in a hostile takeover bid, at which point SoftKey assumed the Learning Company name and brand.

== History ==
The Learning Company was founded on May 8, 1980, by Ann McCormick; Leslie Grimm; Teri Perl; and Warren Robinett, a former Atari, Inc. employee who had programmed the game Adventure. They saw the Apple II as an opportunity to teach young children concepts of math, reading, science, problem-solving, and thinking skills. Part of the original funding for the company came from a National Science Foundation grant.

TLC produced launch titles for the PCjr, announced in late 1983. From 1980 through 1984, it created a line of 15 widely acclaimed children's educational software products, which were sold through the U.S. retail and school computer software channels.

In the first half of 1985, the board hired as CEO Bill Dinsmore. Shortly thereafter, Reece Duca, a founding Partner of the Investment Group of Santa Barbara (IGSB), became a member of the board of directors and purchased shares from several founders and original venture firms. In late 1986, Duca was elected chairman of the board. At that time, IGSB became The Learning Company's largest shareholder.

Between March 1985 and September 1995, TLC's revenues grew at a 36% compounded rate from $2.4M to $53.2M and profitability increased from breakeven in 1985 to a 20% pre-tax margin. The leading families of products were the Reader Rabbit series for ages 2–8, the Treasure Mountain Reading-Math-Science series for ages 5–9, the Super Solver series for ages 7–12, the Student Writing & Publishing Center for ages 7-adult, and the Foreign Language Learning series for ages 15-adult.

TLC went public on April 28, 1992, in an IPO led by Morgan Stanley and Robertson, Stephens & Co. From 1992 to 1995, TLC achieved 16 consecutive quarters of revenues and profits growth, never experiencing a down quarter or year. TLC's early struggles, followed by 10 consecutive years of outstanding performance, were the subject of case studies at both Harvard and Stanford universities.

In 2001, the entertainment division of Learning Co. was renamed Game Studios.

In 2006, The Learning Company became a brand of Houghton Mifflin Company, which later changed its name to Houghton Mifflin Harcourt in 2007 following the acquisition of Harcourt Publishing. Most recently, in July 2024, Houghton Mifflin Harcourt rebranded as simply "HMH" to reflect its focus as a digital-first learning company, moving beyond its legacy as a traditional publisher. The company now provides K-12 adaptive learning solutions, including curriculum, assessment, and professional learning resources. In April 2018, The Learning Company was folded into Houghton Mifflin Harcourt.

=== SoftKey acquisition ===
In December 1995, TLC was acquired by SoftKey for $606M in a hostile takeover bid, and a large percentage of the staff was fired. After the acquisition was complete, SoftKey changed its name to The Learning Company and continued to use its brand. The Learning Company née SoftKey was subsequently acquired by Mattel in August 1999.

== Software ==
Note: When The Learning Company purchased Broderbund Software and MECC, they gained the rights to the long-running Carmen Sandiego and Trail series, respectively. Only those games created during the ownership of The Learning Company are included here.

=== Carmen Sandiego series ===
- Carmen Sandiego's ThinkQuick Challenge (1999)
- Where in the World is Carmen Sandiego? Treasures of Knowledge (2001)
- Carmen Sandiego Adventures in Math (2011–2012)
- Carmen Sandiego Returns (2015)

=== The ClueFinders series ===
- Grade-based titles
  - The ClueFinders 3rd Grade Adventures (1998)
  - The ClueFinders 4th Grade Adventures (1998)
  - The ClueFinders 5th Grade Adventures (1999)
  - The ClueFinders 6th Grade Adventures (1999)
- Other titles
  - The ClueFinders Math Adventures (1998)
  - The ClueFinders Reading Adventures (1999)
  - The ClueFinders Search and Solve Adventures (2000)
  - The ClueFinders Real World Adventure Kit (2001)
  - The ClueFinders: The Incredible Toy Store Adventure! (2001)
  - The ClueFinders: Mystery Mansion Arcade (2002)

=== Fisher-Price series ===
Created and published by Davidson & Associates / Knowledge Adventure and re-released by The Learning Company.

- Fisher-Price: Dream Dollhouse (1995)
- Fisher-Price: Great Adventures: Castle (1995)
- Fisher-Price: Great Adventures: Pirate Ship (1996)
- Fisher-Price: Great Adventures: Wild Western Town (1997)
- Fisher-Price: Big Action Garage (1998)
- Fisher-Price: Big Action Construction (1998)
- Fisher-Price: Little People Christmas Activity Center (1999)
- Fisher-Price: Time to Play Dollhouse (1999)
- Fisher-Price: Time to Play Pet Shop (1998)
- Fisher-Price: Outdoor Adventures: Ranger Trail (1999)
- Fisher-Price: Rescue Heroes: Hurricane Havoc (1999)
- Fisher-Price: Toddler (1999)
- Fisher-Price: Preschool (1999)
- Fisher-Price: Kindergarten (1999)

=== Reader Rabbit series ===
- Age-based titles
  - Reader Rabbit Playtime for Baby (1999)
  - Reader Rabbit Toddler (1997)
- Grade-based titles
  - Reader Rabbit Preschool (1995; originally titled Let's Start Learning!)
  - Reader Rabbit Preschool: Sparkle Star Rescue (2001)
  - Reader Rabbit Kindergarten (1997)
  - Reader Rabbit Kindergarten: Bounce Down in Balloon Town (2001)
  - Reader Rabbit: 1st Grade (1998)
  - Reader Rabbit 1st Grade: Capers on Cloud Nine (2001)
  - Reader Rabbit: 2nd Grade (1998)
  - Reader Rabbit 2nd Grade: Mis-cheese-ious Dreamship Adventures (2001)
- Other titles
  - Reader Rabbit (1984)
  - Math Rabbit (1986; later titled Reader Rabbit Math)
  - Writer Rabbit (1986)
  - Reader Rabbit 2 (1991)
  - Reader Rabbit's Ready for Letters (1992)
  - Reader Rabbit 3 (1993)
  - Reader Rabbit's Interactive Reading Journey (1994)
  - Reader Rabbit's Reading Development Library series
    - Reader Rabbit's Reading Development Library 1 (1995)
    - Reader Rabbit's Reading Development Library 2 (1995)
    - Reader Rabbit's Reading Development Library 3 (1996)
    - Reader Rabbit's Reading Development Library 4 (1996)
  - Reader Rabbit's Interactive Reading Journey 2 (1996)
  - Interactive Math Journey (1996)
  - Reader Rabbit's Math Ages 6-9 (1998)
  - Reader Rabbit's Learn to Read (1999)
  - Reader Rabbit Thinking Adventures (1999)
  - Reader Rabbit Learn to Read With Phonics 1st & 2nd Grade (2002)

=== StarFlyers series ===
- Royal Jewel Rescue (2002)
- Alien Space Chase (2002)

=== Super Seekers games ===
- Treasure Mountain! (1990)
  - Note: This game was originally released as a regular Super Solvers title.
- Treasure MathStorm! (1992)
- Treasure Cove! (1992)
- Treasure Galaxy! (1994)

=== Super Solvers series ===
- Midnight Rescue! (later re-released as Super Solvers Reading and then Leap Ahead! 3rd Grade) (1989)
- OutNumbered! (later re-released as Leap Ahead! 3rd Grade) (1990)
- Challenge of the Ancient Empires! (Ancient Empires) (1990)
- Spellbound! (later re-released as Leap Ahead! Spelling) (1991)
- Gizmos & Gadgets! (1993)
- Mission: T.H.I.N.K. (1997)

=== Trail series ===
- The Yukon Trail (1994)
- Africa Trail (1995)
- The Oregon Trail 3rd Edition (1997)
- Amazon Trail 3rd Edition (1998)
- The Oregon Trail 4th Edition (1999)
- The Oregon Trail 5th Edition (2001)

=== Zoombinis series ===
- Zoombinis Logical Journey (1996; remade 2015)
- Zoombinis Mountain Rescue (2001)
- Zoombinis Island Odyssey (2002)

=== Other games ===
- Explore Yellowstone (1997)
- The Powerpuff Girls: Mojo Jojo's Clone Zone (2002)
- The Powerpuff Girls: Princess Snorebucks (2003)
- Hamtaro: Wake Up Snoozer! (2003)
- Prince of Persia 3D (1999)
- Soul Fighter (1999)
- SpongeBob SquarePants Typing (2004)
- Vlad Tepes Dracula (1997)
  - Scooby-Doo! Mystery Adventures
- Real World Series
  - Operation Neptune (1991)
    - Note: This game was eventually added to the Super Solvers series.
  - Time Riders in American History
  - Math For The Real World
  - PokéROM
- Adventure/puzzle games
  - Rocky's Boots (1982)
  - Gertrude's Secrets (1984)
  - Gertrude's Puzzles (1984)
  - Robot Odyssey (1984)
  - Think Quick! (1987)
  - Logic Quest 3D (1996)
  - Road Adventures USA
- Achieve! games
  - Achieve! Math & Science: Grades 1–3
  - Achieve! Phonics, Reading & Writing: Grades 1–3
  - Achieve! Math & Science: Grades 3–6
  - Achieve! Writing & Language Arts Grades 3–6
- PBS Kids tie-in games
  - Caillou's Magic Playhouse
  - Caillou's Four Seasons of Fun
  - Caillou's Party Fun and Games
  - Zoboomafoo Animal Alphabet
  - Zoboomafoo Creature Quest
  - Arthur: Ready to Race
  - Jay Jay the Jet Plane: Jay Jay Earns his Wings
  - Jay Jay the Jet Plane: High-Flying Sky Circus
  - Jay Jay the Jet Plane: Sky Heroes to the Rescue
  - Cyberchase: Carnival Chaos
  - Cyberchase: Castleblanca Quest
  - Liberty's Kids
  - Arthur's Absolutely Fun Day! (2000)
- Tools and other programs
  - All-Star Typing
  - The American Girls Premiere
  - Read, Write & Type
  - MetroGnomes' Music
  - The Children's Writing & Publishing Center
  - The Writing Center
  - Student Writing Center
  - Pokémon Project Studio (1999)
- Other early educational programs
  - Compton's 99 Encyclopedia Deluxe
  - Magic Spells
  - Bumble Games
  - Bumble Plot
  - Moptown Hotel
  - Moptown Parade
  - Wordspinner
  - Juggles' Butterfly
  - Juggles' Rainbow
  - Juggles' House
  - Ultimate Children's Encyclopedia
