= Windows 3.x =

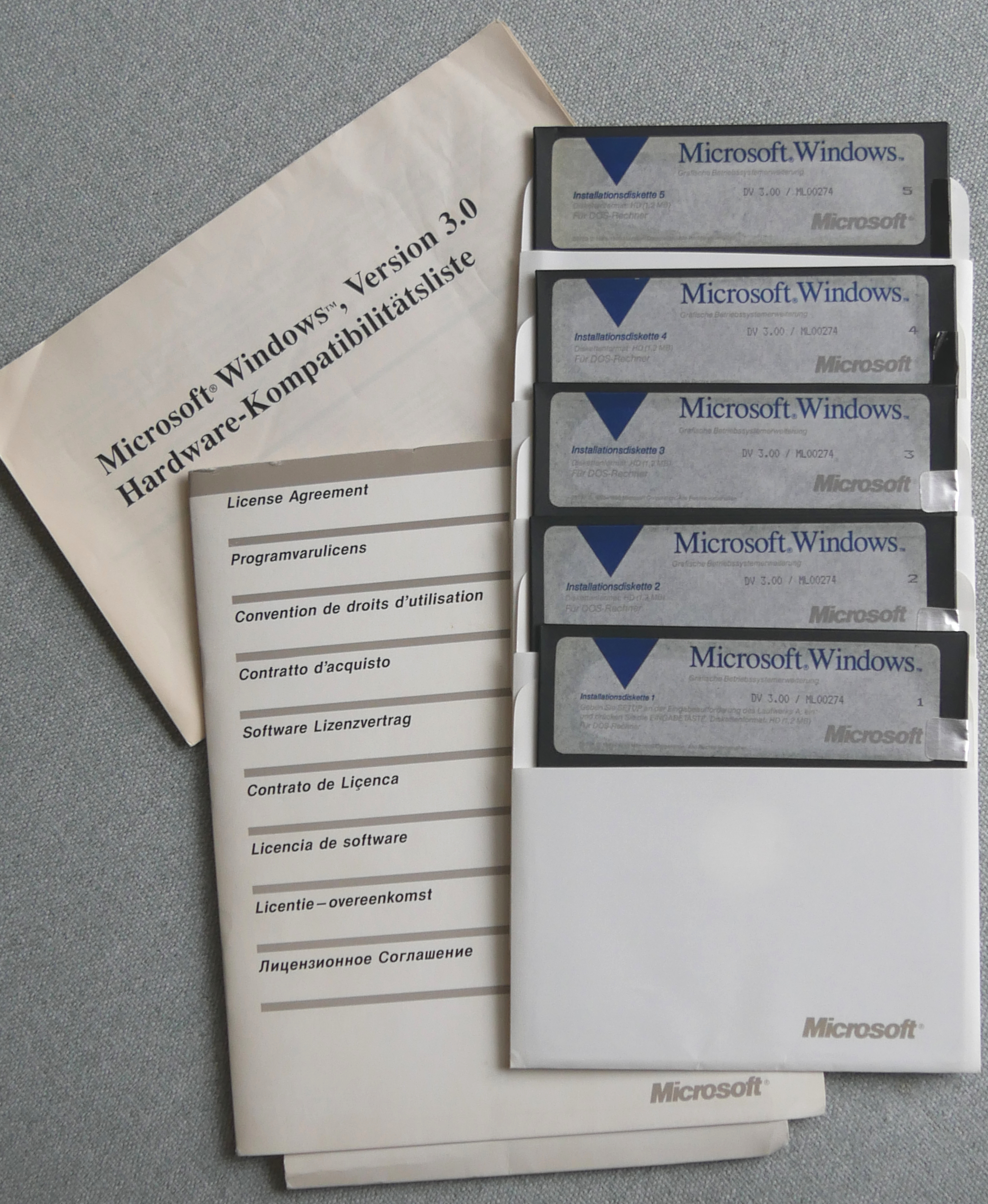
German Windows 3.0 diskettes

Windows 3.x means either of, or all of the following versions of Microsoft Windows:

- Windows 3.0
- Windows 3.1

== Windows NT ==
- Windows NT 3.x
