= Parents' Choice Award =

Award presented by the Parents' Choice Foundation

- Parents' Choice Gold Award
- Awarded for: Excellence in children's products
- Country: United States
- Presented by: Parents' Choice Foundation
- First award: 1978–2022
- Website: parents-choice.org

The Parents' Choice Award was an award presented by the non-profit Parents' Choice Foundation to recognize "the very best products for children of different ages and backgrounds, and of varied skill and interest levels." It was considered a "prestigious" award among children's products, and had been described by the Cincinnati Enquirer as the industry equivalent of an Academy Award. It ended in 2022.

The Parents' Choice Awards were established in 1978 by Diana Huss Green, who was then the president of the Parents' Choice Foundation. The mission was to provide guidance to parents on children’s books and toys. The award recipients were determined by a committee of educators, scientists, performing artists, librarians, parents and children. One of six award commendations were given to award winners: Classic, Gold, Silver, Recommended, Approved or "Fun Stuff."
