= List of Windows 3.x games =

This list contains games released for the Windows 3.x platform, mostly created between 1989 and 1994. Many are also compatible with the later 32-bit Windows operating systems.

This list contains 884 game titles.

== 0–9 ==
Name	Release date	Developer/publisher
101 Dalmatians Print Studio	1996	Disney Interactive
1942: The Pacific Air War Gold	1994	MicroProse
1st Mate - The Pilot	September 14, 1992	Alliance Marine Limited
20,000 Leagues Under the Sea	1995	New Media Schoolhouse, SoftKey
3D Atlas 98'	1997	Creative Wonders
3D Dinosaur Adventure	1996	Knowledge Adventure
3D-Maze	1991	Odin Software Development
3D Body Adventure	1995	Knowledge Adventure, Levande Böcker
3D Thinking Lab	1998	Edmark
3D Ultra Minigolf	1997	Dynamix, Sierra On-Line
3-D Ultra Pinball: The Lost Continent	1997	Dynamix, Sierra On-Line
4-Play	1992	Shortdog Inc.

== A ==
Name	Release date	Developer/publisher
A to Zap!	1995	Sunburst Communications
ABM Command	1993	Kent Rollins
Ace Ventura	1996	7th Level, Bomico Entertainment
Achi	1991	Firas Bushnaq, WinWare
Achtung Spitfire!	1997	Big Time Software, Avalon Hill
Admirals Command	1992	SimoneSystems Software
The Adventures of Batman & Robin Cartoon Maker	1995	Instinct Corporation, Knowledge Adventure
The Adventures of Busy Billy	1996	Guildsoft, Microforum
The Adventures of Hyperman	1995	SAPIEN Technologies, IBM
The Adventures of Ninja Nanny & Sherrloch Sheltie	1993	Silicon Alley
The Adventures of Valdo & Marie	1997	Ubisoft
Adventures With Oslo: Tools and Gadget	1994	Science for Kids
Aesop's Fables	1994	Discis Knowledge Research
Affairs of the Court	1994	CR Software Solutions
Africa Trail	1995	MECC, The Learning Company
Age of Sail	1996	TalonSoft
Alge-Blaster	1994	Davidson & Associates
Alice: An Interactive Museum	1994	Toshiba-EMI, Synergy Inc.
Alien Force	1990	Robert Epps
Alien Tales	1995	Broderbund
All Dogs Go to Heaven Activity Center	1997	MGM Interactive, Roaring Mouse Entertainment
Allie's Playhouse	1993	Opcode Interactive
Allied General	1995	Halestorm, Inc, Strategic Simulations, Inc.
Alone in the Dark 3: Ghosts in Town	1994	Infogrames
AlphaBonk Farm	1994	Headbone Interactive, SoftKey
Amanda Stories	1991	The Voyager Company
Amazon Skulls	1993	Toggle Booleans
The Amazon Trail	1994	MECC
Amazeing	1995	Happy Puppy Software
The American Girls Premiere	1997	The Learning Company
Amnesia	1992	Oscar Daudt Neto
Ancient Yacht	1995	LatticeWork Software
AnnaTommy: An Adventure into the Human Body	1994	Viridis Corporation, IVI Publishing
Angela's Bug Swat	1993	Mike Murphy
The Animals Of Farthing Wood	1996	BBC Multimedia
Animated Blackjack	1997	Ultisoft
Anyone for Cards?	1994	Random Programming, Capstone Software
ArithmeTick-Tack-Toe	1994	Indigo Rose Software Design
ArtRageous!	1995	SuperStudio, Future Vision Multimedia
Asteroids		
Astronomica: The Quest for the Edge of the Universe	1994	FX Media, Ringling Multimedia
Atmoids	1990	Andre Weber, IBD GmbH
Attaxx	1991	Millennium Computer Corp.
Audio Cipher	1994	William D. Hause, Mosquito Hawk Software
The Awesome Adventures of Victor Vector & Yondo: The Cyberplasm Formula	1995	Sanctuary Woods
Awesome Animated Monster Maker	1994	ImaginEngine, Houghton-Mifflin
Aztec Curse, The	1993	New Zone Productions

== B ==
Name	Release date	Developer/publisher
Babes in Toyland	1997	Conexus, Inc., MGM Interactive
Baby Brats - Super Play Room	1994	Albert C. Ashton
Backgammon	1990	Graphics Software Labs, Microforum Manufacturing Inc.
Backyard Baseball	1997	Humongous Entertainment
Backyard Soccer	1998	Humongous Entertainment
Bad Day on the Midway	1995	inSCAPE
Bad Mojo	1996	Pulse Entertainment, Acclaim Entertainment, Inc.
Bad Toys	1995	Tibo Software
Bailey's Book House	1991	Theatrix Interactive, Inc., Edmark
Balance of Power: The 1990 Edition	1990	Mindscape
Ballistic	1994	Glenn Nissen
Balloons Phrase Game	1995	Steven T. Fricke
Banania	1992	Data Becker
Bang! Bang!	1990	David B. Lutton II
Bankshot	1994	Orbital Software
Barbie and Her Magical House	1994	The Cute Company, Hi Tech Expressions
Barbie Fashion Designer	1996	Digital Domain
Barbie Storymaker	1996	Mattel Media
Barry the Bear	1994	IMSI, Living Media
Baseball's Greatest Hits	1994	The Voyager Company
Bastille	1991	Firas Bushnaq, WinWare
Battle Beast	1995	7th Level, BMG Interactive
Battle Chess	1991	Interplay
Battle Chess Enhanced	1991	Interplay
Battle Isle 2220: Shadow of the Emperor	1995	Blue Byte
Battle Sat	1991	Firas Bushnaq, WinWare
BattleGrid	1993	Bob Dolan
Battleground: Bulge-Ardennes	1995	TalonSoft
Battleground 2: Gettysburg	1995	TalonSoft
Battleground 3: Waterloo	1996	TalonSoft
Battleground 4: Shiloh	1996	TalonSoft
Battleground 5: Antietam	1996	TalonSoft
Battleground 6: Napoleon in Russia	1997	TalonSoft
Battleground 7: Bull Run	1997	TalonSoft
Battleground 8: Prelude to Waterloo	1997	TalonSoft
BB-16-inch Guns	1994	Albert C. Ashton
The Beast Within: A Gabriel Knight Mystery	1995	Sierra On-Line
Beauty and the Beast	1996	NTK Entertainment Technology, Memorex Software
BeeTris	1996	
Beginning Reading	1993	Bright Star Technology
Bermuda Syndrome	1995	Century Interactive, BMG Interactive
Best of Microsoft Entertainment Pack	1995	Microsoft, Microsoft Home
Betrayal in Antara	1997	Sierra Entertainment
Beyond Planet Earth	1994	Discovery Channel Multimedia
Bible Cryptogram	1993	Jim Fox, Mainstay Computer
Big Thinkers 1st Grade	1997	Humongous Entertainment
Big Thinkers Kindergarten	1997	Humongous Entertainment
The Bizarre Adventures of Woodruff and the Schnibble	1994	Coktel Vision, Sierra On-Line
Black Dog Cribbage	1994	Black Dog Software
Blackout	1991	Zarkware
Blades of Exile	1995	Spiderweb Software
Blinky Bill And The Magician	1999	Forest Interactive, The Learning Company
Blinky Bill's Ghost Cave	1996	DreamCatcher Interactive
Blitzer	1991	WayForward Technologies
Block Breaker	1992	Yutaka Emura, Emurasoft
Block Eleven	1994	Russell T. Kemsley
Blockade	1991	Etienne Varloot
Blown Away	1994	Imagination Pilots, IVI Publishing
Blox	1990	
Blue Ice	1995	Art of Mind Productions, Psygnosis
Bodyworks: An Adventure in Anatomy	1993	Mythos Software, Software Marketing Corporation
Bomb Squad	1994	Eric Bergman-Terrel, Pocket-Sized Software
Bomb Squad (Orbital)	1993	Orbital Software
Bonk Barney!	1992	Phil and Gareth, Borland International
The Book of Shadowboxes	1995	EduQuest, IBM
Bow and Arrow	1992	John di Troia
Boxem	1993	Flat Rabbit Software
Boxes	1994	Dynotech Software
Boxes II	1995	Dynotech Software
Boxes III	1996	Dynotech Software
Boxworld	1992	Jeng-Long Jiang
Brain Jam	1992	Brain Jam Publications
Brainteaser	1992	Alan F. Shikoh
BreakThru!	1994	Zoo Corporation, Spectrum HoloByte
Brer Rabbit and the Wonderful Tar Baby	1991	Rabbit Ears Productions, American Interactive Media
Brick Breaker II	1994	Henry Yu, YuS Design Studio
Bricks	1990	
Bricks: the Ultimate Construction Toy!	1996	Gryphon Software Corporation, Knowledge Adventure
Brickbuster	1995	Impressions Software
Bubble Trouble	1993	Dreamers Guild
Bubbles	1998	Dynotech Software
Bug!	1995	Realtime Associates, Sega
Bug Explorers	1996	Roaring Mouse Entertainment, Memorex Software
Burglary	1993	Immo Zech
Burn:Cycle	1994	TripMedia, Philips Interactive Media

== C ==
Name	Release date	Developer/publisher
Canfield	1992	Daniel Thomas
Capitol Hill	1993	Amazing Media, Software Toolworks
Card Counter	1993	Gordon Haff
Carlton Card Game	1993	P.B. Cook
Carmen Sandiego Word Detective	1997	Broderbund
Carmen Sandiego: Junior Detective	1995	Broderbund, Selectsoft Publishing
Casper Brainy Book	1995	Knowledge Adventure
Castle Explorer	1996	DK Multimedia
Castle of the Winds	1993	SaadaSoft, Epic MegaGames
Catz: Your Computer Petz	1996	PF.Magic
Cell War	1992	Al Funk
Centipede	1993	Microsoft
Chameleon	1994	David J. Lains, Little Shop Of Software
Checkers	1990	Gregory Thatcher
Cheese Terminator	1992	Zsolt Krajcsik, Microsoft Corporation
Chess	1992	Microsoft Corporation
Chessmaster 3000	1993	Software Toolworks
Chessmaster 4000 Turbo	1993	Software Toolworks
Chess Mates	1995	Stepping Stone, Brainstorm
Chip's Challenge	September 14, 1992	Epyx, Microsoft Corporation
Chomp	1991	Neolithic Software, WayForward Technologies
Cinema Volta	1994	The Voyager Company
Cipher	1993	Brad Trupp
Civilization	1991	MicroProse
Civilization II	1996	MicroProse
Code Breaker	1993	Greg Nesbitt
The Color Wizard	1994	Imagisoft
Colossal Cave	1992	Wolfgang Strobl
Columns (video game)	1990	
Comet Busters!	1991	HAMCO Software, Xtreme Games LLC
Comic Book Confidential	1994	The Voyager Company
The Complete MAUS	1995	The Voyager Company
Connections	1995	Discovery Channel Multimedia
Conway's Game of Life	1993	Dave Crawford
Core War	1994	Stage Research
Cow V: The Great Egg Quest!	1992	J. Suchman, Bovine Software
Crawler!	1994	Moonlight Entertainment
Crayola Magic Princess: Paper Doll Maker	1999	Crayola Interactive, IBM
Crazy Eights	1995	Cosmi Corporation
Cribbage	1993	Walter Warniaha, Greg Baker
Crispy1	1992	Chris Pando
Critical Path	1993	Mechadeus, Media Vision Technology
Crossword Magic	1996	Cosmi
Cruel Solitaire	1990	Microsoft Corporation
Curious George Learns Phonics	1997	Riverdeep, Vipah Interactive, Simon & Schuster Interactive
Curling	1991	David McIntosh

== D ==
Name	Release date	Developer/publisher
Daedalus Encounter, The	1995	Mechadeus, Virgin Interactive
Daisy's Garden	1994	Dipl. Ing. Frank Burkart
Daisy's Garden 2	1996	Dipl. Ing. Frank Burkart
Daleks	1991	
Dally Doo You Can Too! Numbers	1997	ArcMedia.com
Dama Italiana	1993	PC Solutions
Dare to Dream	1993	Epic MegaGames
Dark Seed II	1995	Destiny Media Technologies, Cyberdreams
Dave Dude in the Holiday Story 95	1995	Christian Naumann, Philipp Schröder
Daryl F. Gates' Police Quest: SWAT	1995	Sierra Entertainment
A Day at the Beach With the Fuzzooly Family	1995	Funnybone Interactive, Davidson & Associates
Dazzeloids	1994	The Voyager Company
Deadlock: Planetary Conquest	1996	Accolade
Defendroid	1995	Glen Summers, Crapola Software
Deflektor PC	1998	Vortex Software
Deja Vu: A Nightmare Comes True!!	1991	ICOM Simulations
Desert Storm	1991	InterAction Software
Destroyer for Windows	1992	Don Krafcheck
Dewey Goddard's Tournament Golf	1996	Mindworks Software
Discovering Endangered Wildlife	1995	Lyriq International
Diamonds 3D	1996	Varcon Systems, WizardWorks
Dino Cards	1996	Dynotech Software
Dino Match	1994	Dynotech Software
Dino Number	1994	Dynotech Software
Dino Spell	1994	Dynotech Software
Dino Slot	October 8, 1994	BFM Software
Dino Tiles	1996	Dynotech Software
Dinonauts: Adventures in Space	1995	Orbital Studios, Virgin Sound and Vision
Dinosaur Safari	1996	Creative Multimedia Corporation, Mindscape
Disney's Activity Center: Aladdin	1994	Gryphon Software Corporation, Disney Interactive
Disney's Animated Storybook: The Hunchback of Notre Dame	1996	Media Station, Disney Interactive
Disney's Animated Storybook: Hercules	1997	Media Station, Disney Interactive
Disney's Animated Storybook: The Lion King	1994	Media Station, Disney Interactive
Dodger		
Double Talk	1995	Boyle and Elggren Games, Inc
Double Block	1991	Firas Bushnaq, WinWare
Dr. Blackjack	September 14, 1992	Mike Blaylock, Microsoft Corporation
Dr. Stop!	1990	Alice Soft
Dracula in London	1993	SDJ Enterprises
Dragon In A Wagon	1997	DiAmar Interactive
Dreadnought	1994	Pierre Clouthier, Progeny Software
Drivin' Route 66	1995	Cambridge Digital Media, Creative Multimedia Corporation
The*Drums	1992	Fabio Marzocca
Dubbel	1994	Norman Martina, Bytes Control
Duck Hunt for Windows	1993	Andrew Novotak
Duel		
Dust: A Tale of the Wired West	1995	Cyberflix, GTE Entertainment

== E ==
Name	Release date	Developer/publisher
Earthsiege 2	1995	Dynamix, Sierra Entertainment
Ecco the Dolphin	1995	Novotrade International, Sega
Econ's Arena	1994	Mark Drejza
EcoQuest2 - Lost Secret of the Rainforest	1993	Sierra On-Line, Inc.
Egg Carton Game, The	1992	Paul Talbot, PT WinWare
Election '92	1992	John Di Troia
Electro-Cute!	1994	Stuart Reedy, StuSoft
Elroy Goes Bugzerk	1995	Headbone Interactive
Elroy Hits the Pavement	1996	Headbone Interactive
Elroy's Costume Closet	1996	Headbone Interactive
Emlith	1992	Yutaka Emura, WayForward Technologies
EmPipe	199?	Yutaka Emura, Emurasoft
Empire Deluxe	1993	White Wolf Productions, New World Computing
Endorfun	1995	Onesong Partners, Time Warner Interactive
Enemy Nations	1997	Windward Studios, Head Games Publishing
Entomorph: Plague of the Darkfall	1995	Cyberlore Studios, Mindscape
Escapade	1995	MoraffWare
Euchre	1993	Land-J Technologies
Europress Bookshelf: Alice in Wonderland	1995	Europress Software, Q Range
Europress Bookshelf: The Gingerbread Man	1996	Europress Software, Q Range
Europress Bookshelf: Goldilocks and the Three Bears	1996	Europress Software, Q Range
Europress Bookshelf: The Hunchback of Notre Dame	1996	Europress Software, Q Range
Europress Bookshelf: Journey to the Center of the Earth	1995	Europress Software, Q Range
Europress Bookshelf: Peter Pan	1996	Europress Software, Q Range
Europress Bookshelf: Tom Sawyer	1996	Europress Software, Q Range
Europress Bookshelf: Topsy and Tim at Granny and Grandpa's	1996	Europress Software, Q Range
Europress Bookshelf: Topsy and Tim at the Supermarket	1996	Europress Software, Q Range
Europress Bookshelf: Topsy and Tim go to School	1996	Europress Software, Q Range
Europress Bookshelf: Treasure Island	1996	Europress Software, Q Range
The Even More Incredible Machine	1993	Jeff Tunnell Productions, Sierra On-Line, Dynamix
Exile: Escape from the Pit	1995	Spiderweb Software
Exile II: Crystal Souls	1996	Spiderweb Software
Exile III: Ruined World	1997	Spiderweb Software
Explore Yellowstone	1996	MECC, The Learning Company

== F ==
Name	Release date	Developer/publisher
F-18: No Fly Zone	1994	Doe Entertainment
F.Godmom	1996	Soggybread Software
Falling OZ	199?	Dynotech Software
Fatty Bear's Birthday Surprise	1993	Humongous Entertainment
Fatty Bear's Fun Pack	1993	Humongous Entertainment
Firo and Klawd	1996	Interactive Studios, BMG
Fisher-Price Learning in Toyland	1996	Funnybone Interactive, Davidson & Associates
Fisher-Price Ready for School: Kindergarten Edition	1998	Knowledge Adventure, Davidson & Associates
Flip Out!	1992	Kent Johnson
Follow Me	1994	Orbital Software
Foo Castle	1992	O'Connor House Software
Football for Windows	1991	Tommy Sager, TSoft
Forever Growing Garden	1993	Communication Wave, Media Vision
Forty Thieves and King's Corner	1992	Paul DeWolf
Four Seasons Solitaire		
FoxFire 13	1994	Randy Risa, Todd Svec
Fox Hunt	1994	Dave Gidcumb
Fox Hunt	1996	3Vision Games, Evolutionary Publishing, Inc., Capcom
Frankenstein: Through the Eyes of the Monster	1996	Amazing Media, Interplay Entertainment
Franklin's Activity Center	1996	Sanctuary Woods
Freddi Fish and Luther's Maze Madness	1996	Humongous Entertainment
Freddi Fish and Luther's Water Worries	1996	Humongous Entertainment
Freddi Fish and the Case of the Missing Kelp Seeds	1994	Humongous Entertainment
Freddi Fish 2: The Case of the Haunted Schoolhouse	1996	Humongous Entertainment
Freddi Fish 3: The Case of the Stolen Conch Shell	1998	Humongous Entertainment
Freddy Pharkas: Frontier Pharmacist	1993	Al Lowe, Josh Mandel, Sierra On-Line
FreeCell	1991	Microsoft Corporation
Freedom Under Siege	1992	The Game Commission
Front Page Sports: Baseball Pro '96 Season	1996	Dynamix, Sierra On-Line
Front Page Sports: Trophy Bass 2	1996	Dynamix, Sierra On-Line
Fruit Cakes	1997	Dynotech Software
Frustration	1993	Chad Alan Olson, ChAOs Computing Group
Full Tilt! Pinball	1996	Cinematronics, Microsoft
Fun School Special - Paint and Create	1993	Europress
Fun with Phonics	1995	Nissen Ventures
Fury3	1995	Terminal Reality, Microsoft

== G ==
Name	Release date	Developer/publisher
Gadget: Invention, Travel & Adventure	1993	Synergy Inc.
Gatling	1991	Scott Gourley
Gearheads	1996	Philips Media
Gizmos & Gadgets!	1995	The Learning Company
Ghosts	1994	Media Design Interactive
Glider	1994	John Calhoun
GNU Chess	1991	Daryl Baker
Gold Monkey	1994	Gold Software
Gold Pusher	1993	Willen Vree
Golf	1990	Microsoft Corporation
Grand Prix Manager 2	1996	Edward Grabowski Communications, MicroProse
Great Adventures by Fisher-Price: Castle	1995	Davidson & Associates
Great Adventures by Fisher-Price: Pirate Ship	1996	Funnybone Interactive, Davidson & Associates
Great Adventures by Fisher-Price: Wild Western Town	1997	Funnybone Interactive, Davidson & Associates
The Greatest Paper Airplanes	1994	KittyHawk Software
The Greens	1993	Shadoware
Grossology	1997	Appaloosa Interactive, SegaSoft
Gus Goes to Cybertown	1993	Modern Media Ventures
Guys	1990s	I.V.S. Entertainment Software

== H ==
Name	Release date	Developer/publisher
Hallowe'en Match		
Hamurabi of Babylon	199?	Michael K. Kroeger
Hangman Jr.	1992	Alston Software Labs
Hangman Jr. Test Drive	1993	Alston Software Labs
Hanna-Barbera's Cartoon Carnival	1995	Funhouse Design, Philips Interactive Media
Happy Fun Ball		
Harpoon Classic	1995	Applied Computing Services, Inc., Three-Sixty Pacific, Inc., Renegade Software
Harpoon Classic '97	1996	Alliance Interactive, Interactive Magic
Hearts	1991	Microsoft Corporation
Henry's Game	1994	Jaemon D. Franko
Here They Come!	1994	Eric Kenslow, Stimulus Gaming
Hero: The Challenge		Jamie C. Wakefield
Herrscher der Meere	1997	NovaTrix GmbH, Attic Entertainment Software GmbH
Hex Tetris	1990	
Hex Trap	1995	Cosmi Corporation
Hodj 'n' Podj	1995	Boffo Games, Inc., Virgin Interactive
Hollywood Mogul	1997	Hollywood Mogul Company
Hop	1990	David A. Feinleib
Hop-Skip Jump-A-Roo Zoo	1997	DiAmar Interactive
Hotels and Motels		
Hoyle Bridge	1996	Sierra On-Line
Hoyle Children's Collection	1996	Sierra On-Line
Hoyle Poker	1997	Sierra On-Line
Hoyle Solitaire	1996	Sierra On-Line
Hugo II, Whodunit?	1995	Gray Design Associates
Hugo III, Jungle of Doom!	1995	Gray Design Associates
Hugo's House of Horrors	1995	Gray Design Associates
The Hunchback of Notre Dame	1996	Isabelle Bristow
Hurricane	1993	Timothy Schmidt & Norm Pollock, Systems Software Developing
Huygen's Disclosure	1996	Microforum International
Hyperoid	1991	Hutchins Software, WayForward Technologies

== I ==
Name	Release date	Developer/publisher
I Love Science	1997	DK Multimedia
Ice & Fire	1995	AnimaTek, GT Interactive
Iconwar	1992	Eric Jannett
In Search of the Lost Words	1996	FlagTower, Compedia
In the 1st Degree	1995	Adair & Armstrong, Broderbund
Incredible Machine 2, The	1995	Dynamix, Sierra On-Line
The Incredible Toon Machine	1994	Jeff Tunnell Productions, Sierra On-Line
Indiana Jones and his Desktop Adventures	1996	LucasArts
Inside Coloseum	1994	Bruce Radburn, Freelance Software
Inspektor Zebok: Das Erbe	1994	Silly Wood Productions, BHV Verlags
Interactive Math Journey	199	The Learning Company
Ion	1992	Grant Dibert, The EMN Group
Iron Helix	1993	Drew Pictures, Spectrum Holobyte
Isis	1994	Snow Lion Entertainment, Panasonic Interactive Media

== J ==
Name	Release date	Developer/publisher
Jewel Thief	1992	ServantWare
Jet Trader	1994	Shad Sluiter
JezzBall	1992	Dima Pavlovsky, Microsoft Corporation
JigSawed	1991	Tito Messerli, Microsoft Corporation
JJR Raceway	1994	Joe Roehrig
Johnny Castaway	1992	Sierra On-Line/Dynamix
Jones in the Fast Lane	1990	Sierra
Jonny Quest: Cover-Up at Roswell	1996	Virgin Sound and Vision
Josho	1993	Zach Stern, Hard Software
The Journeyman Project	1993	Presto Studios, GameTek
The Journeyman Project: Turbo!	1994	Presto Studios, Sanctuary Woods
The Journeyman Project 2: Buried in Time	1995	Presto Studios, Sanctuary Woods
Juggler	1995	Cosmi Corporation
Jumper	1991	Firas Bushnaq, WinWare
JumpStart 1st Grade	1995	Knowledge Adventure
JumpStart 2nd Grade	1996	Knowledge Adventure
JumpStart Adventures: 3rd Grade - Mystery Mountain	1996	Knowledge Adventure
JumpStart Adventures: 4th Grade - Haunted Island	1996	Knowledge Adventure
JumpStart Adventures: 5th Grade - Jo Hammet, Kid Detective	1997	Knowledge Adventure
JumpStart Kindergarten Reading	1996	Knowledge Adventure
JumpStart Pre-K	1996	Knowledge Adventure
The Jungle Book: The Legend Of Mowgli	1995	Hollywood Interactive Digital Entertainment

== K ==
Name	Release date	Developer/publisher
KaleidoKubes	1991	Artworx Software
Kid Pix	1992	Broderbund
King's Quest VII: The Princeless Bride	1994	Sierra Entertainment
Kloks	1993	Steven Marshall, Homespun Software
Klotski	1991	ZH Computer Corp.
Klotz	1990	Wolfgang Strobl
Knight	1991	Firas Bushnaq, WinWare
Knight's Tour	1992	Todd Morley
Koala Lumpur: Journey to the Edge	1997	Broderbund, Colossal Pictures
Kye	1992	Colin Garbutt
Kyodai Mahjongg	1997	Naoki Haga

== L ==
Name	Release date	Developer/publisher
Labyrinth	1995	Cosmi Corporation
The Laffer Utilities	1992	Sierra On-Line
Lander	1990	TMA
Laser Strike	1993	Kevin Ng
Laser Trace	1994	David Putnam
Leapfrog Solitaire		
Leisure Suit Larry 6: Shape Up or Slip Out!	1993	Sierra On-Line
Leisure Suit Larry: Love for Sail!	1996	Sierra On-Line
Legions	1994	Mindscape
Lemmings	1994	Psygnosis, DMA Design
Let's Explore the Airport	1995	Humongous Entertainment, Random House
Let's Explore the Farm	1994	Humongous Entertainment, Random House
Let's Explore the Jungle	1995	Humongous Entertainment, Random House
Let's Go Read: An Island Adventure	1997	Edmark
Liberation of Kuwait	1991	Joe Sengir, Patrick Shuss
Life 3000	March 25, 1992	David R. Bunnell
LifeGenesis	September 30, 1991	Microsoft Corporation
Lighthouse: The Dark Being	1996	Sierra On-Line
Lines	1995	AbreuSOFT
Lion King Print Studio, The	1994	Disney Interactive
Living Books: Arthur's Reading Race	1996	Broderbund, Random House
Living Books: Arthur's Teacher Trouble	September 21, 1992	Broderbund, Random House
Living Books: The Berenstain Bears: In The Dark	1996	Broderbund, Random House
Living Books: Harry and the Haunted House	1994	Broderbund, Random House
Living Books: Just Grandma and Me	February 16, 1992	Broderbund, Random House
Living Books: The New Kid on the Block	September 20, 1993	Broderbund, Random House
Living Books: The Tortoise and the Hare	March 22, 1993	Broderbund, Random House
Living Puzzles: Triazzle	1995	Berkeley Systems, Softgold Computerspiele
Local Area Dungeon	1993	Mike Berro, BCS Software
Lock Out	1995	Cosmi Corporation
Lode Runner: The Legend Returns	1994	Presage, Sierra On-Line
Logic Quest 3D	1996	The Learning Company, Softkey Multimedia
Logical Journey of the Zoombinis	1996	Broderbund
Logiphrases	1991	Pierre A. Sicart
Loopz	1992	Christopher Yvon
Lost in a Labyrinth	1993	Zane Rathwick, Addsoft Software
The Lost Mind of Dr. Brain	1994	Sierra Entertainment
Lotto Luck	1993	Ben Saladino
Lotto Simulator	1993	Don Fordham, Southwest Software Associates
Luca's Problem	1990	James M. Curran
Lucky Stars Video Slots	1994	Ultimate Software
Lunacy	1995	Kevin Ng
Lunar Basketball	1994	Steve Neeley

== M ==
Name	Release date	Developer/publisher
MacBlaster	1992	Earl Gehr
Magic Fairy Tales: Barbie as Rapunzel	1997	Media Station, Mattel Media
The Magic School Bus Explores the Human Body	1994	Microsoft Home, Microsoft
The Magic School Bus Explores Inside the Earth	1996	Music Pen, Microsoft
The Magic School Bus Explores the Ocean	1995	Microsoft Home, Microsoft
The Magic School Bus Lost in the Solar System	1994	Microsoft Home, Microsoft
Mah Jongg for Windows	1992	Ron Balewski, SyncroSoft
Marble	1993	Peter Balch
Marbles	1998	Dynotech Software
Marbles II	1999	Dynotech Software
Mario Teaches Typing 2	1997	Brainstorm, Interplay Entertainment
Mario's Time Machine	1993	Software Toolworks, Inc.
Master of the Maze	1993	Spice Software
Matchem	1993	Flat Rabbit Software
Math Bingo	1994	DiNo Software
Math Blaster Episode I: In Search of Spot	1993	Davidson & Associates
Math Blaster Episode II: Secret of the Lost City	1994	Davidson & Associates
Math Blaster Mystery: The Great Brain Robbery	1994	Davidson & Associates
Math Virus	2021	Fax Software Inc
Medieval War	1993	Mark Brownstein, Burnham Park Software
Math Munchers Deluxe	1997	MECC, The Learning Company
Math Rabbit Deluxe	1993	The Learning Company
Maui Mallard in Cold Shadow	1995	Eurocom, Disney Interactive
Max and Marie Go Shopping	1995	Contor Interaktiv, Tivola Verlag
MayaQuest: The Mystery Trail	1995	MECC, The Learning Company
The Maze	1994	Lynn Alford
Mazer	1994	Richard Stock
Melee at Sea	1994	Bill Bergmann
Mercer Mayer's Just Me and My Dad	1996	Big Tuna New Media, GT Interactive
Mercer Mayer's Just Me and My Mom	1996	Big Tuna New Media, GT Interactive
Merlin: The Quest for the Wand	1992	Carl Bjork
Metal Marines	1993	Mindscape
Meteor Shower	1995	Cosmi Corporation
Metris	1997	magnussoft Deutschland GmbH
Microsoft Ancient Lands	1994	Microsoft
Microsoft Complete Baseball: 1994 Edition	1993	Microsoft
Microsoft Complete Baseball: 1995 Edition	1994	Microsoft
Microsoft Complete NBA Basketball Guide '94-'95	1994	Microsoft
Microsoft Dangerous Creatures	1994	Microsoft
Microsoft Dinosaurs	1993	Microsoft
Microsoft Explorapedia - The World of Nature	1995	Microsoft
Mickey & Friends Print Studio	1995	Disney Interactive
Micro Man	1993	Brian L. Doble
Microsoft Entertainment Pack	1990	Microsoft, Microsoft Game Studios
Microsoft Golf	1992	Access Software, Microsoft Corporation
Minesweeper	1990	Microsoft Corporation
Microsoft Reversi	1985	Microsoft
Midnight Rescue!	1995	The Learning Company
Mighty Math Number Heroes	1996	Edmark
Mile Bones	1992	Andre Needham
Millennium Auction	1994	Eidolon
Millie's Math House	1992	Theatrix Interactive, Edmark
Milo	1996	Crystalvision Software, Sibling Interactive
Mines	1990	
Minesweeper	1992	Microsoft Corporation
Miser Mind	1990	Mark Laffoon, M & M Productions
Mission Alphatron	1994	Dee Key, Andy Key
Missile Attack!	1992	Peter Siamidis
Mission Thunderbolt	1992	Dave Scheifler, John Calhoun, Casady & Greene
Molbreko Castle	1993	John Okerblom
Moku	1990	Chris Graham, WarpSpeed Computers
Money Town	1996	Simon & Schuster Interactive, Davidson & Associates
Monopoly	1995	Westwood Studios, Hasbro Interactive
Monopoly Deluxe	1992	Virgin Games
Monty Python's Complete Waste of Time	1994	7th Level
Monty Python & the Quest for the Holy Grail	1996	7th Level
Morejongg	1995	MoraffWare
Mother of all Battles	February 1994	Sean O'Connor
Mr. Drumstix' Music Studio	1993	Howling Dog Systems Inc.
Mr Pill	1993	Rodney Wood
Ms. Chomp	November 5, 1992	Peter Siamidis
Murder	1994	
Mynes		
Myst	1995	Cyan Worlds, Broderbund

== N ==
Name	Release date	Developer/publisher
Name of the Game	1993	Toggle Booleans
NanoMan	1992	Richard Shock, Microscam Shareware
NCC-1701	1992	Robert W. Feakins
Neko	1989	Kenji Gotoh
Neural Ned in Ned's World	1993	David S. Smiczek
Nitemare 3D	1994	Gray Design Associates
Nisus Missile Master	1993	Scott A. Murray, Nisus Development & Technology
Noddy: The Magic of Toytown	1997	Grolier Interactive, Hachette Multimedia
Nuclear Winter	1996	HAMCO Software
Nuts!	1993	

== O ==
Name	Release date	Developer/publisher
Oddballz: Your Wacky Computer Petz	1996	PF.Magic
Odell Down Under	1995	MECC, SoftKey
Office Darts		
Oh No! - A Game of Chance	1994	Stephen R. Woods, Financial Systems Associates, Inc.
Oil Baron	1992	Al Funk
One Armed Bandit	1991	Wicked Witch Software
Opening Night	1995	MECC
Operation: Inner Space	1994	Software Dynamics
Operation Neptune	1995	The Learning Company
The Oregon Trail Version 1.2	1993	MECC, Broderbund
The Oregon Trail II	1995	MECC, Softkey
Orly's Draw-A-Story	1997	Broderbund
Ouija Board	1993	Scott Gifford
Our House featuring The Family Circus	1992	Context Systems, Microsoft
Outpost	1994	Sierra On-Line

== P ==
Name	Release date	Developer/publisher
P.A.W.S.: Personal Automated Wagging System	1998	Domestic Funk Products, Digital Garden
Paddle Battle		
Pajama Sam: No Need to Hide When It's Dark Outside	1996	Humongous Entertainment
Pajama Sam 2: Thunder and Lightning Aren't so Frightening	1998	Humongous Entertainment
Pajama Sam's Lost & Found	1998	Humongous Entertainment
Pajama Sam's Sock Works	1997	Humongous Entertainment
Palace of Deceit, The	1991	Cliff Bleszinski, Game Syndicate Productions
Panic in the Park	1995	Imagination Pilots, WarnerActive
Parsec	1993	Brad L. Rucker, Code Toad Productions
Patuman	1993	
Paulie Python	1993	Craig P. Thompson, Way Out West-ware
Pegged	1990	Microsoft Corporation
Pensate	1992	Torstein Hansen
PentaBlox	1994	Aquila Software
Pente	1990	Darrell Plank
Pepper's Adventures in Time	1993	Sierra Entertainment
Picture Perfect Golf	1994	Q, Lyriq International
Perestroika	1995	Nikita Ltd.
Perfect Chessmate	1999	Gunnar Games
Peter and the Wolf	1995	7th Level, IBM
Chuck Jones' Peter and the Wolf	1994	IF/X Interactive, Time Warner Interactive
Phantasmagoria	1995	Sierra On-Line, Kronos Digital
The Pink Panther: Passport to Peril	1996	Wanderlust Interactive, BMG Interactive Entertainment
Pipe Dream	1991	LucasArts, The Assembly Line, Microsoft Corporation
Pipeline	1993	Rudiger Appel, Markub Golschinski
Playskool Puzzles	1996	ImageBuilder Software, Hasbro Interactive
Poker Broker	June 1995	Louis Nguyen
Poker Solitaire	1994	Brad Trupp
Police Quest: Open Season	1993	Sierra Entertainment
The Porsche Legend	1995	Ocean Software
Power of Zenalok, The	1993	James Payne
Power Politics	1992	Software Technology, Inc., Cineplay Interactive
Powerhouse	1995	Impressions Games
Prairie Dog Hunt	1993	Ian Firth, Diversions Software
Prince Interactive	1994	Graphix Zone, Compton's New Media
Prison Guard Tower Tracker	1994	Albert C. Ashton
The Psychotron	1994	The Multimedia Store, Merit Software
Putt-Putt and Fatty Bear's Activity Pack	1995	Humongous Entertainment
Putt-Putt and Pep's Balloon-o-Rama	1996	Humongous Entertainment
Putt-Putt and Pep's Dog on a Stick	1996	Humongous Entertainment
Putt-Putt Enters the Race	1998	Humongous Entertainment
Putt-Putt Goes to the Moon	1993	Humongous Entertainment
Putt-Putt Joins the Parade	1992	Humongous Entertainment
Putt-Putt Saves the Zoo	1996	Humongous Entertainment
Putt-Putt Travels Through Time	1997	Humongous Entertainment
Putt-Putt's Fun Pack	1993	Humongous Entertainment
Pyramis Solitaire	1993	Jim Waddell
Pyst	1997	Peter Bergman, Parroty Interactive

== Q ==
Name	Release date	Developer/publisher
Qin: Tomb of the Middle Kingdom	1996	Learn Technologies Interactive, Time Warner
Quantum Gate	1993	Hyperbole Studios
Quatra Command	1993	PlayDoe Entertainment Software
Quenzar's Caverns	1993	Pulse Ventures, Ltd
Quest for Fame	1995	Virtual Music, IBM
Quest for Glory IV: Shadows of Darkness	1993	Sierra Entertainment

== R ==
Name	Release date	Developer/publisher
Rance: Hikari o Motomete	1990	Alice Soft
Rance II: Hangyaku no Shōjotachi	1991	Alice Soft
Rance III: Leazas Kanraku	1991	Alice Soft
Rats!	1994	Sean O'Connor
Rattler Race	September 30, 1991	Christopher Lee Fraley, Microsoft Corporation
Read, Write, & Type!	1995	The Learning Company
Reader Rabbit 1 Deluxe	1996	The Learning Company
Reader Rabbit 2 Deluxe	1996	The Learning Company
Reader Rabbit 3 Deluxe	1996	The Learning Company
Reader Rabbit Toddler	1997	The Learning Company
Reader Rabbit's Interactive Math Journey	1996	The Learning Company
Reader Rabbit's Interactive Reading Journey	1993	The Learning Company
Reader Rabbit's Interactive Reading Journey 2	1994	The Learning Company
Reader Rabbit's Kindergarten	1997	The Learning Company
Reader Rabbit's Reading Development Library	1994	The Learning Company
Reader Rabbit and Friends: Let's Start Learning!	1995	The Learning Company
Reader Rabbit's Reading 1	1997	The Learning Company
Reader Rabbit: 1st Grade	1997	The Learning Company
Reader Rabbit: 2nd Grade	1997	The Learning Company
Reproduction Man	1995	Muse Computer Services
Reversi	1985	Microsoft Corporation
Risk	1991	Azeroth, Inc., Virgin Interactive
RoboSport	1991	Maxis
Robot City	1995	Brooklyn Multimedia, Byron Preiss Multimedia
Robots	1993	S. Coren, Com-Link
Rodent's Revenge	1991	Christopher Lee Fraley, Microsoft Corporation
Rodney's Funscreen	1992	Art in the Box, Activision
Romance of the Three Kingdoms IV: Wall of Fire	1996	Koei, Inis
Roulette	1993	Pyramid Software Development
Roxie's ABC Fish	1995	LatticeWork Software
Roxie's Math Fish	1995	LatticeWork Software
Roxie's Reading Fish	1995	LatticeWork Software
RSC Test Cricket	1994	Brett Freedman
Runner	1993	SouthBay Software

== S ==
Name	Release date	Developer/publisher
Safety Monkey	1994	Viridis Corporation, IVI Publishing
Sammy's Science House	1994	Theatrix Interactive, Edmark
SCAT	1994	Bob Dolan
Science Shop with Monker	1995	Information Technology Design Associates, Western Publishing Company
Science Sleuths	1996	Videodiscovery
Scissors, Paper, Stone	1991	David McIntosh
Score Builder for SAT	1995	Compton's Learning
Scrabout	1995	Lance Frohman
Search and Destroy	1992	Randy Baron
Secrets of the Pyramids	1994	Ednovation, Mindscape
Sensible Golf	1994	Sensible Software, Virgin Interactive
Sesame Street: Art Workshop	1995	Children's Television Workshop, Creative Wonders
Sesame Street: Elmo's Preschool	1997	Children's Television Workshop, Creative Wonders
Sesame Street: Get Set To Learn	1996	Creative Wonders, Electronic Arts
Sesame Street: Let's Make a Word!	1995	Children's Television Workshop, Creative Wonders
Sesame Street: Letters	1995	Children's Television Workshop, Creative Wonders
Sesame Street: Numbers	1995	Children's Television Workshop, Creative Wonders
Shadowgate	1993	ICOM Simulations, Inc., Viacom New Media
Shadows of Cairn	1994	Ant Software, Masque Publishing
Shanghai: Great Moments	1995	Quicksilver Software, Activision
Shanghai II: Dragon's Eye	1994	Activision
Shooter	1993	Albert C. Ashton
Shop Drop	199?	Dynotech Software
ShotGun	December 16, 1993	Albert C. Ashton, PCSTS
Pirates! Gold	1994	MPS Labs, MicroProse
SimAnt	1991	Maxis
SimCity	1992	Maxis
SimCity 2000	1994	Maxis, Electronic Arts
SimEarth	1990	Maxis
SimFarm	1993	Maxis, Mindscape
SimJack	1995	Keith Marting
SimLife	1992	Maxis
Simon	1991	Mark Gamber
The Simpsons Cartoon Studio	1996	Big Top Productions, Fox Interactive
SimTower	1994	OPeNBooK Co., Ltd., Maxis
SinkSub	1993	Anders Wihlborg
SinkSub Pro	1996	Anders Wihlborg
Six Feet Under	1994	EnQue Software
Skifree	1991	Chris Pirih
Slam!	1993	Robert Epps
Slot Machine	1990	Brett McDonald
Smash'em	1995	Galt Technology
Smithsonian Institution: Dinosaur Museum	1997	Perspective Visuals
Smelly Mystery Starring Mercer Mayer's Little Monster Private Eye, The	1997	Big Tuna New Media, GT Interactive
Snakes	1991	Kevin L. Patch
Snoopy's Campfire Stories	1996	Virgin Sound and Vision
Soccer Management Simulator	1994	Serious Games
Sokoban for Windows	1992	Allan B. Liss
Solar Vengeance	1994	Silicon Commander Games
Solitaire	1990	Microsoft Corporation
Solitaire Golf	1990	Steve Laterra
Space Bucks	1996	Impressions Games, Sierra On-Line
Space Dodge'm	1994	P. Steve Neeley
Space Exploration - Mission Alpha	1992	Jeffrey R. Marken
Space Guard	1995	Cosmi Corporation
SpaceRocks	1994	Eric Lee Steadle, Brian Lowes, Warped Software NQI
Space Rocks	1993	Adam J. Taub, Himom Inc.
Space Traveler	1993	Jeffrey R. Marken
Space Walls	1990	Adam J. Taub, Himom Inc.
Space Walls II	1992	Adam J. Taub, Himom Inc.
Span-It!	1993	Mark T. Chapman
Spectre VR	1993	Velocity Development
Spellbound!	1993	The Learning Company
Spelling Blizzard	1994	Bright Star Technology, Sierra On-Line
Spelling Jungle	1993	Bright Star Technology, Sierra On-Line
Spider	1991	Mark U. Edwards
Spider, Double Deck Solitaire	1992	Troy Miller
Spy Fox in "Dry Cereal"	1997	Humongous Entertainment
Spy Fox in "Cheese Chase"	1998	Humongous Entertainment
Squeaky Mouse	1994	Toru Eguchi, ike
SqueezePlay	1992	Henderson Graphics
Squirmer	1994	Christopher Cifra
Stanley's Sticker Stories	1996	Edmark
Star Wars Chess	1993	Software Toolworks
Stardate 2140.2: Battles on Distant Planets	1992	Glacier Edge Technology
Stax	1993	Chris Dyer
Stellar Empires	1993	Tahuya Bay Software
Stellar Explorer	1992	Technological Computer Innovations
Stellar Warrior	1992	Michael McAuliffe
Stop the Bus	1994	Martin Davidson
Storybook Weaver	1994	MECC
Storybook Weaver Deluxe	1995	MECC
Strategy Challenges Collection	1991	Edmark
Strategy Challenges Collection 2: In the Wild	1997	Edmark
Street Shuffle	1994	Max Eissler, Maxware
Student Writing Center	1994	The Learning Company
Student Writing & Research Center	1995	The Learning Company
Super Craps	1993	Chris Peterson
Super Tetris	1991	Sphere, Inc., Spectrum Holobyte
Super Video Poker	1993	Elton M. Inada
SwatM	1993	Jim Fox, Mainstay Computer

== T ==
Name	Release date	Developer/publisher
Taaltris	1997	Visual Reality
Tai chi	1994	Sunmoon USA
TailGunner	1993	Ian Firth, Diversions Software
Taipei	1990	Microsoft Corporation
Tank Tracker	1993	Albert C. Ashton
Tarot	1993	Anthony Nguyen
TC Joust	1994	Anthony J. Carin
TC Star Trek	1994	Anthony J. Carin
TC Virtual World	1994	Anthony J. Carin
TDK Pinball Machine	1995	TDK Marketing Europe
Temple of Rahj, The	1994	GDM Software Publishing
Terrace	1994	Terrace Games, Mercury Software
TetraVex	1991	Microsoft Corporation
Tetris	1990	Microsoft Corporation
Tetris Classic	1992	Spectrum Holobyte
Tetris Gold	1993	Sphere, Inc., Spectrum Holobyte
Tetris for Windows	1989	Dave Edson, Bogus Software
Thieves and Kings	1992	Paul DeWolf
Thinkin' Things Collection 1	1993	Edmark
Thinkin' Things Collection 2	1994	Edmark
Thinkin' Things Collection 3	1995	Edmark
Thy Dragon	1994	Albert C. Ashton
Thy Super Knight	1994	Albert C. Ashton
TicTactics	1990	Microsoft Corporation
TiC-TaC-ToC	1990	JPSoft
Tic Tac Toe	1993	Ben J. Winter
Tic Tac Toe	2015	Raymai
Tic-Tac-Toe	1991	Firas Bushnaq, WinWare
Tic-Tac-Toe	1990	Digital Simulations
Tic-Tac-Toe	1993	Stephen Smith
Tiles and Tribulations	1992	Technological Computer Innovations Corporation
Timon & Pumbaa's Jungle Games	1995	7th Level, Disney Interactive
Tonka Construction	1996	Vortex Media Arts, Hasbro Interactive
Tonka Search & Rescue	1997	Media Station, Hasbro Interactive
Torin's Passage	1995	Sierra On-Line
Touzai-Mahjong	1994	Junichi Saitoh
The Tower from Hanoi	1993	Mohammed Agamia
Toybox	1997	Dynotech Software
Tracon for Windows	1993	Wesson International
Trails	1995	Cosmi Corporation
Trap Shooting		
Treasure Cove!	1994	The Learning Company
Treasure Galaxy!	1994	The Learning Company
Treasure MathStorm!	1996	The Learning Company
Treasure Mountain!	1994	The Learning Company
Trek 96	September 15, 1996	J&O Software
Triple Yahoo!	1993	Dan Puraty
Triple Yahtzee	1992	Garrett Marshall
Troggle Trouble Math	1994	MECC
Trudy's Time and Place House	1995	Theatrix Interactive, Edmark
Tut's Tomb	1991	Microsoft Corporation
Twisted Mini Golf	1995	DGS Software, General Admission Software
TZ-Minigolf	1995	Thomas Zeh

== U ==
Name	Release date	Developer/publisher
U-95 (Windows game)	1995	Nikita
UFO Tracker	1993	Albert C. Ashton
Ultima 21 Blackjack	1993	Bitwise Software
The Ultimate Haunted House	1994	Byron Preiss Multimedia, Microsoft Home
Uncle Julius and the Anywhere Machine	1995	AHA! Software
United Pixtures	1993	Kirin Entertainment
Uninvited	1993	ICOM Simulations, Mindscape
Ultra Blast	1995	MoraffWare
Ultra Blast II	1995	MoraffWare
U.S.S. Destroyer Tracker	1994	Albert C. Ashton

== V ==
Name	Release date	Developer/publisher
VB Diceroll	1991	Benjamin L. Combee
Venture	1994	Richard Foley
Video Draw Poker Challenge	1992	Don Willis
Virtual Surgeon: Open Heart	1997	ISM, Inc.
Virtual Valerie 2	1995	Reactor
VIRUS: The Game	1996	Dynotech Software
Voodoo Doll for Windows	1992	Diversions Software

== W ==
Name	Release date	Developer/publisher
WallBall	1993	Jukka Heinovirta, Pertti Leino, Tuomo Reipsaari
Walnuts	1994	Eric Lee Steadle, Brian C. Lowe
Warhead	1991	WayForward Technologies
Western Shoot Out	1994	Andrew Novotak
Wheel of Fortune	1994	Absolute Entertainment, Sony Imagesoft
Wheel of Fortune: Deluxe Edition	1994	Imagitec Design, GameTek
Wheel of Luck	1992	Dan Puraty
Where's Waldo at the Circus	1995	Imagination Pilots, WarnerActive
Where's Waldo Exploring Geography	1996	Imagination Pilots, WarnerActive
Why did the Chicken Cross the Road	1994	Jim Fowler
Wiggins in Storyland	1994	Virgin Sound and Vision
WinAnt	1994	David Morrissey
WinBattle		
WinCrypt	1993	Tony Anderson
Win Daleks	1993	S. Coren, Com-Link
Win Detectives	1994	Drazof Industries
WinRoids		
Winvade		
Windows Blackjack	1994	Robert R. Villwock
Windows Command		
Windows Life	1993	Jean Michel
Windows Wizard	1992	George Campbell, Ososoft
WinFish	1993	2 Guys Software
WinGo!	1993	Bob Dolan
WinMind	1993	Compass Point Software
Win Pelvis-N-Space	August 29, 1993	Brett McDonald, BFM Software
WinPong	1993	Eric Saito
WinPool	1992	Ismail Arit
WinRisk	1992	Steve Stancliff
WinRoids	1993	Stephen Baxter
Win Slot	1992	Brett McDonald, BFM Software
WinTrek	1992	Joe Jaworski, Paladin Systems North
Win Trek	1992	Brett McDonald, BFM Software
Winvade	1994	PC Finch Software
Win Wayout	1992	Thomas Tarody, Erich Kitzmuller, The Entertainment Group
WinWorld	1993	Aldo Baiocchi, Jab Software
Wishbone and the Amazing Odyssey	1996	Human Code, Palladium Interactive
The Wolf and the Seven Little Goats	1995	Future Publishers
Word Hunter	1992	Alan D. Reeve, REEVEsoft
WORDHAI	1990	Michael F. C. Crick
WordMan	1993	Carl Bjork
Wordstalk	1992	Frank Bielsik, Mallard Software
WordSearch Mania!	1994	Michael J. Baker
Words	1996	Dynotech Software
World Empire II	1992	Viable Software Alternatives
World Empire III	1994	Viable Software Alternatives
WorldNet Games	1995	MoraffWare
World of Aden: Entomorph - Plague of the Darkfall	1995	Cyberlore Studios, Strategic Simulations, Inc., Mindscape
Worm	1990	Sarmad Adnan
Worm 4	1992	Sarmad Adnan, Gulcu Ceki
Worm War	1990	Kirk Saathoff
WormWorld	1993	Kevin Ng
Wrath of the Gods	1994	Luminaria
Wumpus for Windows	1993	Monte Ferguson
Wyatt Earp's Old West	1994	Amazing Media, Grolier Electronic Publishing

== X ==
Name	Release date	Developer/publisher
Xmas Gifts		
Xword: Crossword Puzzles	1989	Dominion Software

== Y ==
Name	Release date	Developer/publisher
YabWEye	1992	Jeff Tomlinson, Kittsoft
Yacht	1990	Frank Bielsik, Mallard Software
Yacht-Z	1991	Bob Dolan
Yahtzee	1994	Carlo Bernandi, CBSoft
Yaht-c for Windows	1994	Craig Audustyniak
Yaht-See	1994	John Holland
Yearn2Learn: Master Snoopy's World Geography	1995	Image Smith
Yearn2Learn: Peanuts	1994	Image Smith
Yellow brick road	1996	Synergy Interactive
Yet Another Tetris	1992	Peter Mueller
You Don't Know Jack	1995	Berkeley Systems, Jellyvision, Sierra On-Line
Young Dilbert Hi-Tech Hijinks	1997	KnowWonder
Young Pocahontas Interactive Storybook	1995	UAV Entertainment
Yova	1994	Michael Banks, Eben Stewart
Yow!	1991	Edward Hutchins, Lantern Corp.
The Yukon Trail	1994	MECC

== Z ==
Name	Release date	Developer/publisher
Z & Z Color	1993	Jason Balmuth, Z&Z Software
Z & Z Puzzle	1995	Jeff Hoover, Z&Z Software
Z & Z Recall	1994	Jason Balmuth, Z&Z Software
ZAARK and the Night Team: The Quest for Patterns	1995	Maxis
Zanti!	1993	PSS LL/CT
Zap!	1998	Edmark
Zapitalism	1997	LavaMind, Ionos
Zeddas: Servant of Sheol	1994	Caravan Interactive, Synergy Interactive
Zeek the Geek	1995	Sidewalk Software
Zentris	1991	Robert J., Zenithal Software
Zombie Wars	1996	Gee Whiz! Entertainment
Zone One	1991	Paul McClymont
Zurk's Alaskan Trek	1995	Soleil Software
Zurk's Learning Safari	1993	Soleil Software
Zurk's Rainforest Lab	1994	Soleil Software
