= Index of DOS games (0–9) =

This is an index of DOS games.

This list has been split into multiple pages. Please use the Table of Contents to browse it.

Title	Released	Developer(s)	Publisher(s)
007: Licence to Kill	1989	Quixel	Domark
10th Frame	1986	Access Software	U.S. Gold
1830: Railroads & Robber Barons	1995	Simtex	Avalon Hill
1869	1992	Max Design	Max Design
1942: The Pacific Air War	1994	MicroProse	MicroProse
221B Baker Street	1987	Datasoft	Datasoft
2400 A.D.	1988	Origin Systems	Origin Systems
3 Skulls of the Toltecs	1996	Revistronic	Midway Games West
3-D Helicopter Simulator	1987	Sierra On-Line	Sierra On-Line
3-Demon	1983	PC Research Inc.	PC Research Inc.
3D Body Adventure	1994	Knowledge Adventure	Knowledge Adventure
3D Construction Kit	1991	Domark, Incentive Software	Domark, Incentive Software
3D Dinosaur Adventure	1993	Knowledge Adventure	Knowledge Adventure
3D Lemmings	1995	Clockwork Games Limited	Psygnosis
4-4-2 Soccer	1997	Arc Developments	Virgin Interactive
4D Prince of Persia	1994	Kirill A. Terebilov	Kirill A. Terebilov
4D Sports Boxing	1991	Distinctive Software	Electronic Arts, Mindscape
4D Sports Tennis	1990	Distinctive Software	Mindscape
4th & Inches	1988	Accolade (company)	Accolade (company)
4x4 Off-Road Racing	1988	Epyx, Ogdon Micro Design	Epyx
50 Mission Crush	1984	Simulmondo	Strategic Simulations
500cc Grand Prix	1987	Microïds	Microïds
5th Fleet	1994-12-31	Stanley Associates	Avalon Hill
688 Attack Sub	1989	Electronic Arts	Electronic Arts
7 Colors	1991	Gamos Ltd.	Infogrames
