= Blown Away =

Blown Away may refer to:

- Blowing from a gun, execution by cannon

== Visual media ==
- Blown Away (1993 film), an American erotic thriller film
- Blown Away (1994 film), an American action film
- Blown Away, a 2014 Australian documentary film about Cyclone Tracy, by Danielle MacLean
- Blown Away (TV series), a 2019–present Canadian glassblowing reality competition show
- Blown Away (video game), a 1994 Windows 3.x game

== Literature ==
- Blown Away, a 1986 novel by Ronald Sukenick
- Blown Away, a 1996 Hardy Boys Casefiles novel
- Blown Away, a 2005 children's novel by Patrick Cave
- Blown Away, a 2006 Hardy Boys Undercover Brothers novel

== Music ==
=== Albums ===
- Blown Away (album), by Carrie Underwood, or the title song (see below), 2012
- Blown Away, by Elements, 1985
- Blown Away, by the Wolfhounds, 1989

=== Songs ===
- "Blown Away" (Bachelor Girl song), 1999
- "Blown Away" (Carrie Underwood song), 2012
- "Blown Away", by Akon from Konvicted, 2006
- "Blown Away", by DMX from Year of the Dog... Again, 2006
- "Blown Away", by Jeff Lynne from Armchair Theatre, 1990
- "Blown Away", by King Swamp from King Swamp, 1989
- "Blown Away", by the Pixies from Bossanova, 1990
- "Blown Away", by Tech N9ne from Sickology 101, 2009
- "Blown Away", by Tripping Daisy from Bill, 1992
- "Blown Away", by Warrior Soul from Last Decade Dead Century, 1990

== See also ==
- "Blew Away", a song by Smashing Pumpkins, a B-side of "Disarm"
- "Blow Away", a 1979 song by George Harrison
- "Blow Away", a song by A Fine Frenzy from Bomb in a Birdcage
- "Blow Away", a song by Kate Bush from Never for Ever
