= Mabus =

Mabus may refer to:

- An alleged predecessor to the third antichrist, or the antichrist itself; see Nostradamus in popular culture § "Mabus" as Antichrist
- Quatrain 2:62, work by Nostradamus, which mentions Mabus
- Mabus Point, a cape on the Antarctic coast
- Ray Mabus, former U.S. Secretary of the Navy, former Governor of Mississippi, former U.S. Ambassador
- A musical work for large symphony orchestra by French contemporary composer Jean-Louis Agobet
- First single from 'Devilish' album by Brazilian death/thrash metal band Torture Squad

== See also ==
- Mabu (disambiguation)
- Maabus, an action-adventure videogame
