= Magic Tales =

- Genres: Literature, edutainment
- Developer: Animation Magic
- Publisher: Davidson
- Composer: Tony Trippi
- Platforms: Windows, Macintosh
- First release: The Little Samurai; September 1995
- Latest release: Sleeping Cub's Test of Courage; November 1996

Magic Tales is a series of interactive storybooks for children, developed by Animation Magic and produced by Davidson, which were distributed by Capitol Multimedia, Inc. on CD-ROM for Mac OS and Microsoft Windows. The series was introduced at the 1995 MacWorld trade show. The series began with the release of The Little Samurai (an adaptation of a Japanese folk tale) in 1995. The stories are narrated by the central character Grandpa Mouse, who reads them to his two grandchildren while they are having a boring time. The series was titled "El Abuelo Ratón" in Spanish. Each story has twelve pages.

== Games in the series ==
| Title | Country of origin | Based on | Release date | Notes |
|---|---|---|---|---|
| The Little Samurai | Japan | Issun-bōshi | September 26, 1995 | |
| Baba Yaga and the Magic Geese | Russia | Baba Yaga | October 3, 1995 | Also released in Arabic. |
| Imo and the King | Africa | | November 7, 1995 | |
| The Princess and the Crab | Italy | | September 17, 1996 | |
| Liam Finds a Story | Ireland | | October 1, 1996 | |
| Sleeping Cub's Test of Courage | Native America | | November 12, 1996 | |

== Gameplay ==
The games featured three-dimensional art; approximately 30 minutes' worth of animation, over 500 "click-and-explore" options and original music. The stories were influenced by the ethnic backgrounds of their source material, and aimed to teach children moral lessons. The games were targeted at children aged 3 to 9.

== Reception ==
=== Critical reception ===
The Exceptional Parent recommended the series to parents who wanted to "develop [their] child's interest in words and reading".

Computer Shopper called Magic Tales: The Little Samurai the "most magical" storybook they had played.

=== Commercial performance ===
One hundred thousand copies of the first three Magic Tales titles were distributed around retailers around Christmas. The series gained recognition from the Parents magazine. Three new titles out of 3,000 children's titles would be chosen for three additional products to be released the following Spring.

== Availability ==
- The Magic Tales Collection CD

== See also ==
- Disney's Animated Storybook
- Living Books
- The Kidstory Series
- Playtoons
