= Europress Bookshelf =

- Alice in Wonderland Cover
- Genres: Literature, edutainment
- Developer: Europress Software
- Publisher: Q Range
- Platforms: Windows 3.x, Windows, Macintosh
- First release: Alice in Wonderland; April 6, 1995
- Latest release: The Hunchback of Notre Dame

Europress Bookshelf is a series of interactive storybooks for children, developed by Europress Software and published by Q Range on CD-ROM for Mac OS and Windows, using their own games creator Klik & Play to produce the products with minimal programming. The games came under three series including "Read & Play" for younger readers, "Topsy and Tim" based on the Adamson books and "Living Classics".

== Games ==
=== Gameplay ===
Each product opens in a map screen where the player can click the option to have the story read from beginning to end continuously, click any of the chapter points on the map, play one of several games included or read information about the book author and the book itself. On each page of the story, the player can stop the reading at any time, click interactive objects to trigger animations and click on any highlighted special words to get their definitions.

=== Products ===
Read & Play
Title	Author	Release date	Number of pages	Notes
The Gingerbread Man	St. Nicholas Magazine	1996		Narrated by Daphne Oxenford
Goldilocks and the Three Bears	Robert Southey	1996		Narrated by Daphne Oxenford
Topsy and Tim
Title	Author	Release date	Number of pages	Notes
Topsy and Tim go to School	Jean Adamson and Gareth Adamson	1995		
Topsy and Tim at the Supermarket	Jean Adamson and Gareth Adamson	1996		
Topsy and Tim at Granny and Grandpa's	Jean Adamson and Gareth Adamson	1996		
Living Classics
Title	Author	Release date	Number of pages	Notes
Alice's Adventures in Wonderland	Lewis Carroll	April 6, 1995		Includes 4 games and Sir John Tenniel's original illustrations.
Treasure Island	Robert Louis Stevenson	1995		Includes 4 games
Journey to the Center of the Earth	Jules Verne	1995		Includes 4 games
Peter Pan	J. M. Barrie	1996		Includes 12 games
Tom Sawyer	Mark Twain	1996		Includes 3 games
The Hunchback of Notre Dame	Victor Hugo	1996		

== Development ==
Europress hired professional animators from the film industry to illustrate the characters and interactive objects in the games. Daphne Oxenford was hired to narrate the "Read & Play" stories. The "Living Classics" soundtrack was done with Dolby Surround Sound. The series was released in many languages including English, French, German, Spanish, Italian, Norwegian, Swedish and Danish.

== Release ==
The first three "Living Classics" were translated into Spanish.

== See also ==
- Magic Tales
- Disney's Animated Storybook
- Living Books
- Playtoons
- The Kidstory Series
