= COTW =

COTW may refer to:

- Committee of the Whole

In Cuisine or Science

- Chicken of the Woods, various species of edible shelf mushrooms in the genus Laetiporus

In Entertainment

- The Call of the Wild, a novel by Jack London
- Castle of the Winds, a role-playing video game for Windows
- ”Champion Of The World”, a song by Coldplay featured on their 2019 album Everyday Life
- Children of the World, an album by the Bee Gees
- City of the Wolves, a fighting game by SNK
- "Colors of the Wind", a song performed in the animated film Pocahontas

In Politics or Finance

- Chart of the Week, a periodic technical-analysis column in Interactive Investor
- The "Coalition of the Willing" is a term for those nations which supported the 2003 invasion of Iraq
- Committee of the Whole, a term used in some parliamentary proceedings
