= Imagination Express =

- Genre: Educational
- Developer: Edmark
- Platforms: Windows, Macintosh
- First release: Destination: Castle; 1994
- Latest release: Destination: Time Trip, USA; 1996

Imagination Express is an educational series of interactive storybook generator video games developed by Edmark. The titles in the series include Destination: Castle (November 15, 1994), Destination: Neighborhood (November 15, 1994), Destination: Rain Forest (May 5, 1995), Destination: Ocean, Destination: Pyramids, and Destination: Time Trip, USA.

== Development ==
At the launch of the product line, Edmark CEO Sally Narodick commented that "kids love to tell stories", noting the creations that playtesters of the series had already made. A perspective-based piece of technology was added to the game; dubbed "auto-sizing", it meant that the size of an object changed as it was moved by the player toward the foreground or background.

== Gameplay ==
The games, which are targeted at children aged 6–12, transport players to learning destinations around the globe, and "inspire them to create interactive on-screen stories and beautiful printed books". The games aim to encourage creative writing and imagination skills. The games included background information, such as the "Destination: Rain Forest's Rain Forest Fact Book". Players can add text, music, and their own narration.

== Commercial performance ==
Destination: Rain Forest was the 5th most popular title in the education category sold across 11 Software Etc. stores in the Washington area in the week ending on June 10, 1995.

== Critical reception ==
Chicago Sun-Times deemed the series "high-quality eduware" as well as "clever...mathematics teaching software". The newspaper said the series contained "some of the best software in years to help kids learn how to create stories". Computer Shopper wrote that Destination: Ocean was less effective than it could be because it separated the education and entertainment portions of the game rather than seamlessly integrating them. Daily News said Destination: Ocean "provides such a balance". The Washington Post thought Destination: Rain Forest was a "high-class creativity program". Computers in Libraries praised the series for "provid[ing] a host of tools and interactive methods for children to learn how to write their own stories", rather than passively absorbing the work of developers. PC Mag described Destination: Rain Forest as a "creativity tool". School Library Journal noted that recorded sounds could take up a considerable amount of space on a contemporary computer's harddrive.

According to Billboard, the series is "award-winning". Destination: Rain Forest won a Newsweek Editor's Choice Awards for best children's software in 1995. That same year, Imagination Express received the Silver Award for Best Elementary Education Program for Children at the NewMedia INVISION Awards ceremony. The series won one of the four awards at the 1995-1995 Software Awards; Technology & Learning wrote that the series was "sophisticated" and "smart".
