= Armored Moon: The Next Eden =

1997 video game

- Developer: Sung Jin Multimedia
- Publishers: KOGA (KR), Microforum International (NA)
- Platform: MS-DOS
- Release: KR: July 1997; NA: February 1998
- Genre: Real-time strategy

Armored Moon: The Next Eden is a 1997 real-time strategy video game from Korean developer Sung Jin Multimedia.

Armored Moon: The Next Eden was initially released in South Korea as ADAM: 21C Moon War Story in July 1997. The Korean release was published by KOGA (Korean PC Game Developers Association).

== Gameplay ==
Set in the year 2069, Armored Moon: The Next Eden unfolds on a colonized Moon where two factions—Union 24 and the G7—clash over control. This budget-friendly real-time strategy game offers about forty hours of play across ten missions, emphasizing tactical combat and resource management. Players command four unit types: Bipeds (multi-classed combat walkers), Fighter spacecraft, Cyborgs (used to capture towns), and Suppliers (who repair Bipeds). Units gain experience through combat, encouraging strategic preservation. The game uses a three-quarter isometric view. The economic system revolves around two currencies and six building types. To deploy troops, players must manage Transporters, Control Centers, and Towns, which regulate unit capacity and resource flow.

== Reception ==
Reception

Review scores
Publication	Score
Computer Games Magazine	3/5
GameSpot	2.2/10
PC Gameworld	12%

Computer Games Magazine gave the game a score of 3 out of 5, stating: "Armored Moon includes ten missions, which isn't much by today's gaming standards, and the game probably won't be in contention for Game of the Year—it lacks the glitz and longevity of some of its more expensive real-time brethren. But for half the price of those titles, this software packs quite a gaming wallop"

Games Domain called Armored Moon: The Next Eden lacking in innovation.
