= Mighty Math =

- Genre: Edutainment
- Developer: Edmark
- Publisher: Edmark
- Platforms: Windows, Macintosh
- First release: Mighty Math Carnival Countdown; July 1996
- Latest release: Astro Algebra; 1997

Mighty Math is a collection of six educational video games for the Windows and Macintosh platforms, developed and published by Edmark software. As the title indicates, the games are heavily oriented on mathematics. Two of each games cater for different age groups with fitting content. Carnival Countdown and Zoo Zillions are suited for Kindergarten and 2nd graders and teaches beginner topics. Number Heroes and Calculating Crew cater for 3rd till 6th graders and teaches intermediate topics. Astro Algebra and Cosmic Geometry are designed for 5th till 9th graders and teaches advanced topics. The games were all developed under Harcourt's strategy. In response to the series growing popularity, Edmark launched a website called the "Mighty Math Club" in November.

== Games ==
The series were introduced to teach the concepts of math techniques and reinforcing math skills.

Carnival Countdown was released in July 1996. It teaches counting, sums and early multiplication and division. Number Heroes was released that very same time. It teaches similar content to its predecessor but with larger numbers plus fractions, geometry and graphs and charts.

== Reception ==
The Mighty Math series was a finalist for the Computer Game Developers Conference's 1996 "Best Educational Game" Spotlight Award, but lost the prize to Freddi Fish 2.
