= Expect No Mercy (video game) =

- Developer: Microforum International
- Publisher: Microforum International
- Platform: Windows
- Release: 1995
- Genre: Fighting

Expect No Mercy is a 1995 video game developed and published by Microforum International. It is based on the film of the same name.

== Gameplay ==
The player takes the role of an undercover agent for the Federal Security Bureau tasked with destroying the Virtual Arts Fighting Academy and bringing down its leader. Gameplay centers on martial arts combat against virtual opponents in a series of virtual reality environments, where the player faces martial arts masters, intelligent enemies, hidden traps, and obstacle-based challenges. The game features digitized actors, full-screen rendered graphics, animated character movements, sound effects, and 3D-modeled devices and hazards encountered throughout the mission.

== Reception ==
Reception

Review scores
| Publication | Score |
|---|---|
| Joystick | 30% |
| PC Gamer | 30% |
| PC Review | 3/10 |
| PC Zone | 13% |
| Power Play | 15% |

PC Entertainment found Expect No Mercy to be mediocre. PC Review disliked the gameplay in Expect No Mercy.
