= Jimmie F. Skaggs =

American actor

- Born: Jimmie Neumeier; 1944 or 1945; Hot Springs, Arkansas, U.S.
- Died: July 6, 2004 (aged 59); Highland Park, Los Angeles, California, U.S.
- Years active: 1981–2004
- Spouse: Virginia Morris

Jimmie F. Skaggs (1944 or 1945 – July 6, 2004) was an American actor.

Skaggs was born in Hot Springs, Arkansas, but moved to Valley City, Ohio, as a young boy. He later moved to Elyria, Ohio, as an adolescent. He got his start in acting performing in the All School play, The Great Sabastions. He graduated from Elyria High School in 1963.

Skaggs made guest appearances in numerous television shows, including The A Team, Hunter, Remington Steele, Hill Street Blues, Falcon Crest, Miami Vice, Thirtysomething, Star Trek: Deep Space Nine, Buffy the Vampire Slayer, and Curb Your Enthusiasm (Season 2, Episode 9).

He also appeared in numerous film roles, including the bartender in Catch Me If You Can, a drug dealer in Lethal Weapon, Smilin' Phil Fox in Underworld, Tom Scully in Cutthroat Island, Neil Gallagher in Puppet Master and Devlin in Ghost Town.

He also played the main villain in the interactive film video game Blown Away (1994).

Jimmie Skaggs died at his Highland Park home of lung cancer, according to his wife, actress and director Virginia Morris. He was aged 59 at the time of his death.

== Filmography ==
Year	Title	Role	Notes
1981	The Marva Collins Story	Chester Boland	
1984	The Naked Face	Fallon	
1987	Lethal Weapon	Drug Dealer #1	
1987	Dragnet	Caterer Pagan	
1988	The Night Before	Hood #1	
1988	Ghost Town	Devlin	
1989	Pink Cadillac	Billy Dunston	
1989	Homer and Eddie	Jesus #1	
1989	Cage	Ugly Guy	
1989	Puppet Master	Neil Gallagher	
1990	Solar Crisis	Biker	
1991	Thousand Pieces of Gold	Jonas	
1994	Oblivion	Buteo	
1995	Cutthroat Island	Scully	
1996	Oblivion 2: Backlash	Buteo	
1996	Underworld	Phil 'Smilin' Phil' Fox / Todd Streeb	
1996	Playing Dangerous 2	Andreyz Varglak	
1997	Gang Related	Duncan	
1997	"A Christmas Memory"	Haha Jones	
1998	Whatever It Takes	Roland	
2000	Hollow Man	Wino	
2000	Sunset Strip	Guitar Center Owner	
2000	Highway 395	Lew Grade	
2000	Spin Cycle	Homeless Guy	
2002	Woman on Fire	Nezam	
2002	100 Women	Homeless Guy	
2002	Catch Me If You Can	Bartender	
2003	Dead End	Worker #1	
