= KidDesk =

- Developer: Edmark Corporation
- Platform: Windows, Macintosh
- Type: Edutainment

KidDesk is an alternative desktop software application. KidDesk was Edmark's first internally developed early learning software package. (Edmark was bought by IBM then sold to Riverdeep, now Houghton Mifflin Harcourt Learning Technology.)

KidDesk is compatible with Microsoft Windows 95 and newer, as well as Apple System 7 and newer. KidDesk can be set to start when the computer starts up, and can only be exited through password entry. Adults choose what programs are included for the child to use, what icon represented the desk, and customize the software programs available for use.

== History ==
Edmark first started shipping KidDesk in 1992. In 1993, Edmark updated KidDesk with KidDesk Family Edition for Macintosh and DOS, adding more desk accessories and desk styles (Sometimes included as a free exclusive offer with the Early Learning House and Thinkin' Things Series). In 1995, KidDesk Family Edition was enhanced for Windows 95, and released one month after the new operating system shipped. In 1998, Edmark developed KidDesk Internet Safe. The Internet Safe edition was written for Windows 95, Windows 98, and Macintosh (including OS8). In 2008, HMH ported KidDesk Family Edition was to run on Windows Vista and in 2011 version 3.07 of KidDesk Family Edition was released as part of the 'Young Explorer' suite which is fully supported on Windows XP, Windows Vista and Windows 7.

== Features ==
- A picture editor incorporated into the desk. Used both in the Adult settings menu and in the desk itself. KidDesk users can edit their user logo with a pixel grid paint program.
- A calendar incorporated into the desk. This allows the user to set dates that the user finds important, and allows the date to be marked with a picture or text.
- A password exit feature. For security reasons, the adult can set a password so that KidDesk can only be exited if it is entered. As an extra security measure, the password exit function could only be accessed if the user pressed the ctrl + alt + A keyboard buttons simultaneously.
- A skin changer with several themes - farm, princess, sports, ocean, etc. These themes can be changed.
- The e-mail and voicemail features are customizable depending on the KidDesk installation.
- The ability to add websites that can be accessed on KidDesk, and the ability to block hyperlinks, JavaScript, data entry, etc., on said sites was an added for the 'Internet Safe' edition released in 1998.
- KidDesk Internet Safe edition is available in Spanish and Brazilian-Portuguese versions.

== Reception ==
KidDesk was given a platinum award at the 1994 Oppenheim Toy Portfolio Awards. The judges praised the program's security features allowing "configur[ation] so that kids never have access to the possibly destructive DOS prompt", and concluded that "[i]f you and your kids share a computer, you need to install Kiddesk immediately!"

=== Awards ===
Since 1992, KidDesk has won 15 major awards.

| Year | Nominee / work | Award | Result |
|---|---|---|---|
| 1993 | KidDesk | CODiE Award for Best Education Tool Program | Won |
| 1993 | KidDesk | CODiE Award for Best User Interface in a New Program | Won |
| 1994 | KidDesk | Oppenheim Toy Portfolio Award | Platinum Award |
| 1994 | KidDesk Family Edition | CODiE Award for Best Educational Tool Program | Won |
