= Talking Walls =

2000 video game

- Developer: Edmark
- Publisher: Edmark
- Platforms: Windows; Macintosh
- Release: 2000

Talking Walls is a 2000 video game from Edmark. It is based on the book, "Talking Walls" by Margy Burns Knight and Anne Sibley O'Brien.

== Gameplay ==
The program is structured like an interactive book in which each "page" introduces a specific wall or landmark through two or three paragraphs of text paired with hand‑drawn illustrations. Players can press a Read button to hear the text narrated aloud, and highlighted vocabulary words can be clicked to display their definitions instantly. From each page, players may move into a "Beyond the Walls" section, which opens a new screen containing additional educational materials. These include background information, photographs, historical footage, narrated video tours, and other resources tied to the featured wall or cultural topic. Bibliographies are also provided for users who want to explore further. A teacher's guide accompanies the program, offering activities, discussion questions, and curated lists of books and websites that expand on each topic. The software also provides a link to the Talking Walls website for further information.

== Reception ==
Reception

Review score
Publication	Score
Macworld	4/5

Games Domain praised the learning opportunities. Macworld called Talking Walls' "teacher’s guide" incredibly well researched and insightful.

Talking Walls was a runner-up for the Macworld 16th Annual Editors' Choice Award for Education.
