= Mind Grind =

1996 video game

- Developer: Microforum International
- Publisher: Microforum International
- Platform: Windows
- Release: 1996
- Genre: Trivia Game

Mind Grind is a 1996 video game from Microforum International. It was later released in the U.S. as Quiz Quest in 1997.

== Gameplay ==
Mind Grind is a five‑level trivia game in which alien contestants compete for the right to claim Earth by demonstrating superior knowledge of human trivia. Each level presents a distinct objective beyond answering questions, such as avoiding whirlwinds while climbing pillars or navigating a maze of gates. Throughout the game, a character named Homer serves as the host, offering instructions and reacting to the player's answers. The final level, titled "Looking for Intelligent Signs of Life", requires the player to pilot a ship through space, evade meteoroids, and shoot at crafts that contain trivia questions; taking too many hits ends the game. Saving and exiting returns the player to the start of the current level rather than its midpoint.

== Reception ==
Reception

Review scores
Publication	Score
Computer Gaming World	2/5
GameSpot	5/10
PC Joker	27%
PC Games	31%
PC Action	48%
PC Gamer	45%

GameSpot said "Although Mind Grind tries to take an innovative approach to trivia gaming, it falls short of being a truly entertaining experience".

Games Domain said "Otherwise, Mind Grind is a great choice for anyone looking for a well-rounded trivia game that can be enjoyed by all members of the family".
