= SoulTrap =

1996 video game

- Developer: Microforum International
- Platform: Windows
- Release: November 20, 1996
- Genres: First-person shooter Action
- Mode: Single-player

SoulTrap is an action-adventure video game by Microforum for the Windows 95 platform.

== Gameplay ==
The game is a third-person action adventure that requires the player to perform precise platforming and to shoot down baddies while also taking part in highly accurate jumping. The view from the third to the first person perspective and back can be changed anytime by pressing a single key. It is convenient in certain places throughout the dangerous journey.

The game features a quicksave option, making it a lot easier to complete specific sections that would otherwise could have been much more frustrating.

== Plot ==
The plot centres on Malcolm West, an executive director who has suffered nightmares since childhood. The nightmares have now come back even worse and the only way to defeat his phobias is to fight his way through obstacles and mazes defeating various enemies to win back his soul.

== Release ==
The game was released on November 20, 1996.

== Reception ==
Reception

Review scores
Publication	Score
Computer Games Magazine	2/5
The Windsor Star	7/10
PC Player	3/5
Quad-City Times	3/4

Computer Games Magazine said "With suitably spooky music, a dark tone, a nice assortment of weaponry and a nightmarishly intriguing idea, SoulTrap could've been more. As it is, it's an initially inspirational but repetitive and only marginally entertaining exercise"

Maclean's magazine said "Suffice to say, Soultrap is dastardly difficult-and strangely fascinating"
