= Stephen Biesty =

British illustrator

Stephen Biesty (/biˈɛsti/; 27 January 1961 – 14 February 2024) was a British illustrator who worked extensively in cross section. He frequently collaborated with Richard Platt, who wrote the text for the majority of his books, which covered a wide range of informative cross sections aimed at adults and children, all published by Dorling Kindersley.

== Early life and education ==
Biesty was born in Coventry and grew up in Leicestershire.

In 1979 he joined Loughborough College of Art and Design where he took an arts foundation course. In 1980 he moved to Brighton Polytechnic to gain a BA Hons in Graphic Design specialising in illustration, focusing on historical and architectural drawings. After graduating from Brighton with a first class degree, Biesty went on to gain an MA in Graphic Design at the City of Birmingham Polytechnic, working further in historical reconstruction.

== Career ==
Biesty's work includes Incredible Cross Sections (1992), an international bestseller with over one million copies in print worldwide. Other Biesty books written by Platt include Man-of-War (1993), Castle (1994), Incredible Pop-Up Cross-Sections (1995), Incredible Explosions (1996), Incredible Everything (1997), Incredible Body (1998) and Absolutely Best Cross-Sections Book Ever (1999). Since 1999 he has also illustrated the Millennium Dome Pop-up Book (1999), Gold: A Treasure Hunt through Time (Meredith Hooper) (2002), and Rome (Andrew Solway, Stephen Biesty) (2003). Castle was later made into the educational video game Castle Explorer, as was Man-of-War which was made into Stowaway! A tour of an 18th century Man-of-War. Some have compared Biesty's Incredible Cross Sections to fellow British illustrator Martin Handford's Where's Wally? series; for instance in Man-of-War there is the challenge of spotting a stowaway.

Biesty used paper, pen, ink and water colour paints. He never used a ruler, drawing everything freehand.

Biesty described his work as follows:

There's really no end to the amount of detail you can include. I don't use a computer and I don't think I ever will. I draw with a pencil initially and then I work on top of that with ink, usually a Rotring needle-point pen, but sometimes I use a fine brush which gives the line a little variety, a little texture. Then of course I add colour and atmosphere with watercolour washes.

I always put figures in. As an illustrator you quickly catch on to the fact that nobody's going to look at it if there's no human interest. When you start including figures, you can begin to create a sense of atmosphere. You can show how people relate to a space and you can explore the realities and practicalities of the place, how people lived, how they adapted to their surroundings, how they slept, how they ate.

== Personal life ==
Biesty lived in Somerset with his wife and son. He died on 14 February 2024.

== Bibliography ==
- 1991: Explore the World of Man-made Wonders (Simon Adams)
- 1992: Exploring the Past: Ancient Egypt (George Hart)
- 1992: Incredible Cross-Sections (Richard Platt)
- 1993: Man-of-War (Richard Platt)
- 1994: Castle (Richard Platt)
- 1996: Incredible Explosions (Richard Platt)
- 1997: Incredible Everything (Richard Platt)
- 1998: Incredible Body (Richard Platt)
- 1999: Absolutely Best Cross-Sections Book Ever (Richard Platt)
- 1999: Millennium Dome Pop-up Book
- 2001: The Coolest Cross-Sections Ever! (Richard Platt)
- 2002: Gold: A Treasure Hunt through Time (Meredith Hooper)
- 2003: Rome (Andrew Solway)
- 2005: Egypt (Stewart Ross)
- 2006: Greece (Stewart Ross)
- 2008: Ancient World: Egypt, Rome, and Greece
- 2014: The Story of Buildings, Walker Books. ISBN 978-1-4063-3590-3
- 2014: Castles (Meredith Hooper)
- 2014: Giant Vehicles (Rod Green)
- 2014: Into the Unknown: How Great Explorers Found Their Way by Land, Sea, and Air (Stewart Ross)
- 2015: To the Rescue (Rod Green)
- 2015: Emergency Vehicles (Rod Green)
- 2017: Trains (Ian Graham)
- 2017: Exploring Space: From Galileo to the Mars Rover and Beyond (Martin Jenkins)
- 2018: Flying Machines (Ian Graham)
