= Headbone Interactive =

Defunct children's edutainment company

- Founded: 1993–1994
- Founders: Susan Lammers; Walter Euyang
- Defunct: October 2001
- Products: edutainment CD-ROM

Headbone Interactive, Inc. was an American children-oriented multimedia company located in Seattle, Washington founded around 1993–1994 by Susan Lammers and her husband Walter Euyang. The company folded in October 2001 when their official website went offline.

In 1996 the company signed a sales and distribution agreement with Broderbund, giving the company exclusive North American retail distribution rights for all Headbone CD-ROMs.

== History ==
Susan Lammers graduated from Stanford University in 1980. She joined Microsoft in 1985 and worked as Associate Publisher and Editor-in-Chief of Microsoft Press. Lammers also authored the book Programmers at Work, a collection of interviews with computer industry pioneers.

After working for Microsoft for around eight years, she formed Headbone Interactive with her husband, investing her own money to create and design edutainment CD-ROMs for children. In 1995, the first title, Elroy Goes Bugzerk, was released. It was followed by a sequel, Elroy Hits the Pavement, in 1996. Around that same time, a collection of software called The Gigglebone Gang was created. Four titles were released under that collection (see below). In 1997, an educative and creative website, the Headbone Zone, was created. Around 1998, Headbone Interactive left the CD-ROM business, citing mediocre success despite positive reviews of eight titles, and cut down its staff. That same year, Headbone created Headbone Television and began creating televised programming. Lammers left the company a few months later. In 1999, two television series produced by Headbone began to air: first, "Fidgetmore Academy" on Fox Family, then "Hugo Takes a D-Tour" on Discovery Kids. Headbone was purchased by Bonus.com in 2000 and shut down in October that same year as the Headbone Zone website went offline.

== Awards ==
PC Gamer US named Elroy Goes Bugzerk the "Best Educational Product" of 1995. The editors wrote, "The game's sense of humor is perfectly aimed at its intended audience, and the story is well-written and engaging. Elroy Goes Bugzerk does a better job of hiding educational content in an entertaining game than any other title from 1995." MacUser gave Bugzerk a score of 4 out of 5, and named it one of 1995's top 50 CD-ROMs. The magazine proceeded to nominate the game for its award for the best children's software of 1995, which ultimately went to Thinkin' Things Collection 3.

== Games ==
- Elroy Goes Bugzerk (1995)
- The Gigglebone Gang: Pantsylvania (1995)
- The Gigglebone Gang: Alphabonk Farm (1995)
- Elroy's Costume Closet (1996)
- Elroy Hits the Pavement (1996)
- The Gigglebone Gang: Infinity City (1996)
- Iz and Auggie: Escape from Dimension Q (1996)
- The Gigglebone Gang World Tour (1997)
- Elroy: King of the Jungle (1999) Limited release

== Television series ==
- Fidgetmore Academy (1999, 13x3 minutes) Fox Family Channel
- Hugo Takes a D-Tour (1999, 10x1 minute) Discovery Kids
