= 7 Colors =

1991 video game

- Developer: Gamos
- Publishers: Infogrames; HOT-B (PC-98)
- Platforms: Amiga, MS-DOS, PC-98
- Release: 1991
- Genre: Puzzle
- Modes: Single-player, multiplayer

7 Colors (a.k.a. Filler) is a puzzle video game designed by Dmitry Pashkov. It was developed by the Russian company Gamos in 1991. The game was published by Infogrames for MS-DOS, Amiga, and NEC PC-9801.

== Gameplay ==
The game starts with a board filled with colourful diamonds of varying sizes. On each turn, players recolour diamonds on their side of the board. Only adjacent diamonds of matching colours can be recoloured. By matching colours of the diamonds, players expand their territory. The objective of the game is to control more than a half of the board.
