= Where's Waldo at the Circus =

1995 video game

- Developer: Imagination Pilots Entertainment
- Publisher: WarnerActive
- Platform: Windows
- Release: September 19, 1995
- Genre: Puzzle
- Mode: Single-player

Where's Waldo at the Circus is a computer video game that immerses the player in a rich interactive environment complete with music, sound, and animation. A team of educators assisted with the game design, and the exercises within it conform to the guidelines of the National Council of Teachers of Mathematics and the California Department of Education. The game is designed for children ages 4 through 9.

The game is introduced by Waldo asking the player's name. After answering, the player goes to the Big Top to meet Wizard Whitebeard, who gives options of hearing the story behind the game or jumping right in.

== Gameplay ==
The detailed virtual Where's Waldo? spreads page are four times the size of the screen and fully scrollable, packed with point-and-click characters and activity. The player can find the many hidden trigger spots, or just seek out Waldo right away. Once he is found, the story continues.

Along the bottom of the screen there are access buttons to Wizard Whitebeard, who holds the activity checklist, Senor Piccalilli, who returns the player to the main storyline, and the "Quit" icon.

Aside from spotting Waldo, the game has many mini-games and puzzles, including identifying and matching shapes, placing band members in order by height and by instrument pitch, and more.

By proceeding through the game's environments and activities collecting clues along the way, players eventually enters the Wizard's Den, where they can assemble the collected evidence, review it with help from Waldo and the Wizard, identify the culprit and retrieve the whistle.

All of the features in the game are designed for variable outcomes, with everything from the actual thief to Waldo's location in each screen being randomly determined each time through. This allows the player to play multiple times without repeating the past experience.

== Plot ==
Ringmaster Piccalilli has lost his magic golden whistle, and without it the circus cannot go on. Piccalilli asks the player to aid in its recovery, but first the player has to find Waldo, who will help with the search.

== Development ==
Where's Waldo at the Circus was developed by Imagination Pilots Entertainment, a company founded in 1993 in Chicago.

== Reception ==
Reception

Review score
Publication	Score
The Philadelphia Inquirer	2.5/5

CNET said "Waldo addicts will probably go gaga over this disc, but parents should be warned of some problems".
