= The Adventures of Ninja Nanny & Sherrloch Sheltie =

1993 video game

The Adventures of Ninja Nanny & Sherrloch Sheltie: No. 11 Downing Street
- Developer: Silicon Alley
- Designer: Audrey Csendes
- Platform: Windows 3.0
- Release: 1993
- Genres: Interactive fiction, Educational
- Mode: Single-player

The Adventures of Ninja Nanny & Sherrloch Sheltie: No. 11 Downing Street is a 1993 game by Silicon Alley for Windows 3.0 systems, and is an interactive fiction title with multimedia elements integrated into the text. Despite its marketing as an "educational" game, Ninja Nanny became notable after its release for its unusual and nonsensical content.

== Gameplay ==
A screenshot of Ninja Nanny. Key words in the text are hyperlinked to animations or encyclopedia entries.

Ninja Nanny is an interactive fiction game set as the "premier episode" in a "continuing mystery series" featuring the titular character, Norbetina, a "mischievous cow in search of answers to the riddles of her past", and Sherrloch Sheltie, a "budding computer criminologist". The plot of Ninja Nanny loosely follows the life of a cow named Norbertina, who is hunted by international criminal Baron von Moribund and his team of operatives. Sherrloch Sheltie, a Shetland sheepdog in Scottish attire, makes an appearance but is not a main character.

The game is interspersed with multimedia elements, including animations and choices made with dialog boxes. One of the key features of Ninja Nanny is a built-in dictionary and encyclopedia, titled the DictioPedia NinjaNannica, which connects key words in the story to encyclopedic entries or multimedia items, such as images, audio and video. The narrative of the game features discordant literary and cultural allusions in order to showcase this feature.

== Development ==
Ninja Nanny was created by Audrey Csendes, a San Francisco-based staff member of Silicon Alley responsible for marketing for educational software, who provided text and original art for the game. The game was created using ToolBook, a Microsoft Windows based content creation application. Purporting to be an educational game, the game marketed its intent as conveying a "miniature classical education" through its use of public domain multimedia, with much of it "culled from university libraries". Whilst Silicon Alley expressed plans to develop future interactive fiction titles with an adult focus, these releases were never published.

== Reception ==
Ninja Nanny received minor attention as an advertised example of the emerging genre of multimedia interactive fiction, with the game marketed as "helping pioneer the revolution in book publishing" using "the advent of CD-ROM technology". Computer Gaming World noted the game's "non-linear storytelling" and that its "branching storylines and ancillary information enhance (its) learning value". Electronic Entertainment noted "According to (Silicon Alley), multimedia can "reinvent the novel" by allowing for tangents covering background information or subplots that might otherwise bog down the story. Yet Silicon Alley's First title, No. 11 Downing Street, is a silly kids book."

Reception of Ninja Nanny was limited, with negative attention directed towards the game's nonsensical presentation. Writing for CD ROM Today, David Wade stated the game "is as odd as its title - it's a spotty melange of a mildly entertaining story with digressions into 19th-Century illustrations, encyclopedia entries, amateurish animation, AVI files, dialogue of extremely variable quality, music, and sound effects. It aims for a Monty Python-ish eccentricity but, while achieving a comparable nonlinearity, this little mystery story quite lacks that classic program’s anarchically sharp teeth."

=== Legacy ===
Ninja Nanny remained an obscure title until it received attention in a video by Clint Basinger of Lazy Game Reviews, whose YouTube video on the game received over 300,000 views in 14 November 2015. In his review, Basinger is baffled by the content of the game's animations and story.
