= Awesome Animated Monster Maker =

1995 video game

- Developer(s): ImaginEngine
- Platform(s): Mac OS; Microsoft Windows
- Release: NA: 1995

Awesome Animated Monster Maker was a children's creative play computer video game program on CD-ROM, produced by ImaginEngine and published by Houghton-Mifflin's interactive Division in 1995. It was one of the first pieces of software made for young children, especially in the 2-5 age range.

== Game overview ==
In Monster Maker, users create a monster by sticking together animated parts. Each part has several states: happy, sad, angry, etc. When a monster is happy or sad, its various parts animate together in the new state.

Once a monster is created, one can play various games and activities with it, such as making music, getting clothing and accessories, or printing it out.

Monster Maker was designed for creative play, like a paint program. There were no overarching goals other than to have fun.

ImaginEngine released a follow-up called the Ultra Edition, shortly after the first version. It added four mini-games one can play with a monster, including judo and a water skiing race.

== Technical features ==
Monster Maker was a cross-platform Hybrid CD-ROM that worked in both Apple Macintosh and Microsoft Windows computers. For Windows machines, it would work on 3.11, 95, 98, and NT. For Macs, it had 68k and PowerPC versions.

Monster Maker was programmed in C++. It was developed on Windows NT and then ported to CodeWarrior on the Mac.

Monster Maker ran in four megs of memory. The animation engine was locked at 12 frames per second, regardless of the speed of the computer. It required an Intel 80486 processor and a video card that could do 640x480x8. Under Windows, it relied on the WinG library for its blitter engine.

Monster Maker's blitter engine used a custom sprite codec that was highly optimized for unique content aspects of monster parts. Each part in Monster Maker used a special palette that had four "part colors" and four "sticky colors". The part colors could be changed during blit to allow the user to change the color of parts on the screen. The sticky color could also be changed during the blit, and it would take on the part color of whatever the part was stuck to. For example, an arm could take on the color of whatever body it was stuck to.

The blitter had many advanced features for its time, including the ability to scale parts to an arbitrary size up or down and the ability handle translucency. It used a version of Bresenham's line algorithm to compute the scaling factors, similar to the approach discussed in the Graphics Gems series.

The engine also had the ability to recompile collections of part hierarchies into single composite parts on the fly, which was how the game was able to keep so much animation on the screen.

A sequel, Awesome Animated Monster Maker Math, was released in 1998.
