= Huygen's Disclosure =

1996 video game

Huygen’s Disclosure
- Developer: Microforum International
- Publisher: Microforum International
- Platform: Windows
- Release: December 1996
- Genre: Adventure

Huygen's Disclosure is a video game from Microforum International.

== Gameplay ==
In Huygen’s Disclosure, players take on the role of a lone protagonist tasked with finding a new home for humanity after Earth faces annihilation from ozone depletion—an ecological disaster humorously blamed on a global craze for incinerating insects with hairspray. The game blends action and adventure, and leans heavily into eccentric humor.

== Reception ==
Reception

Review scores
Publication	Score
Computer Games Magazine	1.5/5
Gamecenter	1/5
GameSpot	2.9/10
PC Player	2/5
PC Gamer	68%
Quad-City Times	4/4

Computer Games Magazine said "In the end, Huygen’s Disclosure tries to fit in, but ends up being an outcast wallflower at its own pity party"

GameSpot said "In conclusion, Huygen attempts to combine the action of "Crusader: No Remorse" with a storyline inspired by LucasArts' "The Dig." Unfortunately, a frustrating interface and amateurish visuals make Huygen's Disclosure a chore to play - much less finish"
