= 3-D Dinosaur Adventure =

1993 educational video game

- Developer: Knowledge Adventure
- Publisher: Knowledge Adventure
- Platforms: MS-DOS, Macintosh, Windows
- Release: December 20, 1993: MS-DOS; June 18, 1996: Mac, Win 3.x 1997: Windows
- Genre: Educational
- Mode: Single-player

3-D Dinosaur Adventure is an educational video game by Knowledge Adventure released on CD-ROM for MS-DOS compatible operating systems in 1993. Versions for Macintosh and Windows 3.x were published in 1996. A 1997 re-release and an updated version for Macintosh and Microsoft Windows is titled 3-D Dinosaur Adventure: Anniversary Edition.

== Gameplay ==
3-D Dinosaur Adventure is presented as a theme park, with areas for the player to explore, including an encyclopedia, a quiz, and a virtual museum. They offer insight into how dinosaurs lived and evolved. Additionally, activities teach players how to use fossil photo records and illustrations for visual recognition of dinosaurs.

The title comes packaged with 3D glasses and has special areas that make use of them.

There is also a Doom clone in which the player has to save the dinosaurs from the comet that is about to hit the Earth.

== Development ==
As part of a co-publishing arrangement with Random House Inc. to develop multimedia titles on September 5, 1994, Random House also took over distribution-to-bookstores for current Knowledge Adventure titles such as 3-D Dinosaur Adventure. On July 5, 1995, Random House Children's Books entered into an agreement where they would handle distribution of all Knowledge Adventure software titles in the U.K. and Ireland, given the right to repackage, reprice, and readjust wherever necessary for each target market. The game was uploaded to the ZOOM-Platform.com website in 2014 alongside 3D Body Adventure, Space Adventure, and Undersea Adventure.

== Reception ==
The game was the third best selling Macintosh product in the week ending October 11, 1997.

3-D Dinosaur Adventure was reviewed in the Oppenheim Toy Portfolio Guide Book where it was praised for its "text, beautiful graphics, and amazing sound effects". Characterizing the program as one of "the programs to load on [an older child's computer] first", the authors warned that the programs were resource intensive, "tak[ing] nearly 10 megabytes of disc space [and requiring] a sound card to get the full effect". Multimedia and Hypertext: The Internet and Beyond argued that the small Knowledge Adventure was able to produce a better game than Microsoft's Microsoft Dinosaurs. The Educational Technology Handbook praised the game's animation sequences for bringing the experience to life in a way that students would remember. PC Mag noted the high tech effects were limited, though thought the title was a good reference tool.

Retrospective reviews from the modern era have been more mixed. RetroJunk's 2009 review found the game to be innovative for its time. Bustle's 2016 review, however, deemed the program little more than a glorified encyclopedia.

=== Awards ===
- 1994 – Oppenheim Toy Portfolio Award Platinum Award
- March 1994 – Electronic Entertainment Editors' Choice Awards: Best Edutainment Title (Honorable Mention)
- 1994's Best Overall Education Program by the Software Publishers Association as part of its Excellence in Software Awards Program.
- Top 100 CD-ROMs from PC Magazine 1994

== See also ==
- DinoPark Tycoon
