= Strategy Challenges Collection =

Strategy Challenges Collection 1
- Developer: Edmark
- Publishers: Edmark (formerly); The Learning Company (formerly)
- Platforms: Windows, Macintosh
- Release: 1995 (SCC1); 1997 (SCC2)
- Genre: Educational
- Modes: Single-player, multiplayer

Strategy Challenges Collection is a two-game series of educational video games created by Edmark. The first game, initially released as Strategy Games of the World and later re-released as Strategy Challenges Collection 1, was released in 1995. A sequel was released in 1997 entitled Strategy Challenges Collection 2: In the Wild.

== Gameplay ==
The games each feature three strategy games that the user can play against the computer or another user. In the first game, they are Nine men's morris, Gomoku, and Mancala. In 2, these games are Tablut, Jungle (called "Jungle Chess" in the program) and Surakarta.

Each game has three levels and provides the user with the ability to decide whether a computer opponent will play offensively or defensively. There are six computer opponent characters (two for each of the three levels) and each always plays either offensively or defensively, but each of them appear on a different level in each game. If one plays another user instead of the computer, the leveling will not have any effect on gameplay.

== Reception ==
Strategy Challenges Collection II was a finalist for the Computer Game Developers Conference's 1996 "Best Educational Game" Spotlight Award, but lost the prize to Freddi Fish 2. Games Domain wrote: "Strategy Games of the World is not offering any amazingly new games, but what it does offer are three timeless classics with very slick presentation and a tutor system which is so well animated that it should lure many a kid into spending hours on the games."
