= Edmark =

American software company

Edmark Corporation
- Logo used from 1992 to 1998
- Type: Subsidiary
- Industry: CD-ROM software internet
- Founded: 1970; 56 years ago
- Founder: Gordon B. Bleil
- Defunct: 2017; 9 years ago
- Headquarters: Redmond, Washington, U.S.
- Parent: Houghton Mifflin Harcourt
- Website: Official website (archived)

Edmark Corporation (or simply Edmark) was a publisher of educational print materials and educational software developer based in Redmond, Washington. They developed software for Microsoft Windows and MacOS in several languages and sold it in over a dozen countries.

== History ==
Edmark was founded in 1970 by Gordon B. Bleil through the merger of Educational Aids and Services Co.—a small supplier of educational materials and programs—and L-Tec Systems Inc., which had developed programs based on its research. The Child Development and Mental Retardation Center at the University of Washington, under the direction of Dr. Sidney Bijou, had conducted research into B.F. Skinner’s operant conditioning and reinforcement theories as applied to human learning. From this research, they developed academic programs which for the first time proved the viability of teaching reading to people with severe mental limitations. Bleil adapted this research into the Edmark Reading Program, which became the company's principal product for the next decade.

Bleil left the company to return to banking in 1980 and retained no interest in the company.

They began developing software in 1992. Edmark was listed on NASDAQ. Their audience was children between the ages of 2 and 16 years. Edmark had more than 65 industry design awards.

In 1989, their children, Richard, Lucy, Heather, and Chris became directors. Richard became the chairman, Heather became the CCO, Chris became the president and Lucy became the CEO in October 1989. Edmark hired former teacher Donna Stanger as vice president of product development in October 1991.

In 1992, Edmark released Millie's Math House and KidDesk. Sally Narodick resigned as CEO in September citing the stress, and Stanger became the CEO.

Edmark was acquired by IBM in November 1996, for $102.3 million ($15.50 per share for two-thirds of Edmark's shares) to expand its presence in home software.

In September 2000, it was sold to Riverdeep Interactive Learning for about $85 million.

As of 2017, Houghton Mifflin Harcourt offered the Edmark, Edmark House Series, Mighty Math, and Thinkin' Things brands as licensing opportunities on its website. HMH sold the rights to many of Edmark's products to Rise Global in 2021.

== Software ==
- KidDesk (1992)
- Strategy Challenges Collection 1 (formerly Strategy Games of the World) (November 1995)
- Strategy Challenges Collection 2: In the Wild (1997)
- ThemeWeavers: Animals
- ThemeWeavers: Nature
- Travel the World with Timmy! Deluxe
- Let's Go Read! 1: An Island Adventure - ages 4–6
- Let's Go Read! 2: An Ocean Adventure - ages 7–12
- Stories & More: Animal Friends
- Stories & More: Time and Place
- MindTwister Math
- Space Academy GX-1
- Virtual Labs: Light
- Virtual Labs: Electricity
- Talking Walls ― runner-up for the Macworld 16th Annual Editors' Choice Award for Education
- Talking Walls: The Stories Continue

=== Early Learning House ===
- Millie's Math House (October 1992) ― ages 2–6
- Bailey's Book House (June 1993) ― ages 2–6
- Sammy's Science House (July 1, 1994) ― ages 3–7
- Trudy's Time & Place House (September 1995) ― ages 3–7
- Stanley's Sticker Stories (July 1996)

=== Thinkin' Things ===
- Thinkin' Things Collection 1 (formerly Thinkin Things) (September 1993) ― ages 4–8
- Thinkin' Things Collection 2 (October 1994) ― ages 6–12
- Thinkin' Things Collection 3 (October 1995) ― ages 7–13
- Thinkin' Things: Toony the Loon's Lagoon (remastered version of Thinkin Things Collection 1)
- Thinkin' Things: All Around FrippleTown ― ages 4–8, won the 1999 Macworld Editors' Choice Award for Education
- Thinkin' Things Sky Island Mysteries ― ages 8–12
- Thinkin' Science
- Thinkin' Science Series: ZAP! (1998)

=== Imagination Express ===
- Imagination Express: Neighborhood (October 1994)
- Imagination Express: Castle (November 1994)
- Imagination Express: Rain Forest (May 1995)
- Imagination Express: Ocean (October 1995)
- Imagination Express: Pyramids
- Imagination Express: Time Trip, USA

=== Mighty Math ===
- Mighty Math Carnival Countdown (July 1996) ― ages 4–8
- Mighty Math Number Heroes (July 1996) ― ages 7–12
- Mighty Math Zoo Zillions
- Mighty Math Calculating Crew
- Astro Algebra
- Mighty Math Cosmic Geometry

== Reception ==
Computer Gaming World in 1993 stated that "Bailey's Book House combines the best of educational theory with a loving attention to detail and an engaging presentation ... a real winner".
