= Early Learning House =

1990s collection of educational video games and compilations

- Genre: Edutainment
- Developer: Theatrix Interactive
- Publisher: Edmark
- Platforms: MS-DOS, Windows 3.x, Windows, Classic Mac OS
- First release: Millie's Math House; October 1992
- Latest release: Stanley's Sticker Stories; July 1996

Early Learning House or simply the House Series is a collection of four main educational video games and two compilations for Windows and Classic Mac OS, developed by Theatrix Interactive and published by Edmark software. Each game focuses on a particular learning category with selectable skill settings for preschooler, kindergarten and elementary learners. Millie's Math House (1992) on mathematics, Bailey's Book House (1993) on language, Sammy's Science House (1994) on science, and Trudy's Time and Place House (1995) on history and geography. A spin-off, Stanley's Sticker Stories (1996), sees players create animated storybooks with the series' characters. Millie & Bailey Preschool and Millie & Bailey Kindergarten each contain the combined activities from two of the four software products. In addition the programs can be configured by an adult mode to suit students with special needs. Most of the activities in every game have two modes, one to allow learners to explore and try it out for themselves and the other for learners to follow specific tasks set by the game characters. Learners also have the option to print pictures of creative activities and record sounds in phonics activities. Later the games were re-developed by Houghton Mifflin Harcourt Learning Technology and re-published by The Learning Company with newer graphics and additional activities.

== Production ==
ERAC created an agreement with IBM Canada's K-12 Division, with support from the British Columbia Ministry of Education, to provide the House Series software to British Columbia schools and districts for free. Enhanced versions of the products were announced in September 1995, which included new activities, added difficulty levels, and a Dear Parents Video Presentation.

== Games ==
The purpose of the series is to "provide students with a positive environment to explore early learning concepts".

Millie's Math House was released in October 1992 (enhanced in August 1995) and stars the cow Millie. It primarily focuses on counting, quantities and simple figures divided into nine different activities (seven in earlier versions and six in first version).

Bailey's Book House was released in June 1993, and stars the cat Bailey. It primarily focuses on reading, playing with words and phonics divided into nine different activities (seven in earlier versions and five in the first version).

Sammy's Science House was released on July 1, 1994, and stars the snake Sammy. It primarily focuses on biology, experiments, and matter divided into seven activities (five in earlier versions). The Windows 95 version of the game was shipped on July 31, 1995.

Trudy's Time and Place House was released in September 1995, and stars the crocodile Trudy. It primarily focuses on geography, simulation, and time divided into seven activities (five in earlier versions). Edmark also released software with two house series combined, each of which included half of the respective software's activities: Millie & Bailey Preschool and Millie & Bailey Kindergarten. Millie & Bailey is a two-part edutainment video game series featuring the titles Millie & Bailey Kindergarten and Millie & Bailey Preschool. Edmark repurposed activities from its Early Learning House titles Millie's Math House, Bailey's Book House, and Sammy's Science House into the two multisubject Millie & Bailey games. The former three games could still be purchased individually. Edmark Singles were added to the titles' main menus. These grade-specific school versions contained teacher's guides and toll-free technical support. Both titles were shipped for the 1997 holiday season.

== Reception ==
=== Critical reception ===
The New York Times deemed Edmark an "impressive series", adding that "all four programs are a lot of fun".

A reviewer from SuperKids said Millie's Math House was an "excellent introductory math program for pre-schoolers" that was both educational and fun, while adding that the sound and graphics were adequate. A reviewer from TechWithKids thought the title was "well thought out" and offered a "supportive" environment within which the player could learn, noting that it was suitable for both the classroom and home. The game was reviewed in the Oppenheim Toy Portfolio Guide Book where the authors described the "six quality math games" as appropriate for children aged three to six.

A reviewer from SuperKids said Bailey's Book House was a "classic" and a "must-have" within the early learning genre. Charles Law of PC Alamode Magazine said the game was "multifaceted", and thought it would help young learners "catch up and keep up".

In Jill Fain Lehman's article A Review of Kids' Software for Children with ASD, she deemed the activity Sorting Station from Sammy's Science House a "very good classification game". Ellen Adams wrote that the title offered an "excellent" introduction to science for young children, and thought that the game's entertainment was heightened due to the "constant encouragement". Childhood Education said the game was an "inviting exploration program" and "excellent introduction" to the subject matter.

MacUser gave Trudy's Time and Place House a perfect 5 out of 5 score, and named it one of 1996's top 50 CD-ROMs.

Referring to Millie & Bailey Kindergarten, Emergency Librarian felt "Edmark has truly picked the best of the best to include on this CD [compilation]". Visual Literacy singled out the storyboarding minigame 'Make a Move' in Kindergarten. Young Kids and Computers deemed it an "excellent variety pack" and felt the activities were "well designed". Consumer reports home computer buying guide 2000 noted it as a prime example of "early-learning" software alongside the Freddi Fish series by Humongous.

Child Care Information Exchange wrote that Millie & Bailey Preschool set the standard for appropriate content, active involvement, and for clever embedding of the learning content in preschool computer activities. Exchange reported that "preschoolers ask to play the program over and over again".

=== Awards ===
The Early Learning House games had earned 40 awards around the time of their creation.

Year	Nominee / work	Award	Result
1992	Millie's Math House	MacUser Magazine Editors' Choice Award for Best Children's Program	Won
1993	Millie's Math House	Software Publishers Association Excellence in Software Award for Best Early Education Program	Won
1993	Millie's Math House	CODiE Award for Best Early Education Program	Won
1994	Millie's Math House	Oppenheim Toy Portfolio Award	Platinum Award
1994	Bailey's Book House	Parent's Choice Award for Best Early Childhood Software	Won
1994	Sammy's Science House	Parent's Choice Award for Software	Won
1995	Sammy's Science House	Family Channel Seal of Quality	Won
1996	Trudy's Time and Place House	Software Publishers Association Excellence in Software Award for Best Early Education Program	Won
1996	Trudy's Time and Place House	CODiE Award for Best Early Childhood (K-3) Education Software Program	Won
1998	Millie & Bailey Kindergarten	CODiE Award for Best Education Software Upgrade	Won
