= The Kidstory Series =

- Genres: Literature, edutainment
- Developer: Brilliant Interactive Ideas
- Publisher: Active Imagination
- Platforms: Windows, Macintosh
- First release: The Pirate Who Wouldn't Wash; January 1995
- Latest release: There's a Dinosaur in the Garden; 1996

The Kidstory Series is a series of six interactive storybooks for children, developed by Brilliant Interactive Ideas and produced by Active Imagination (a Packard Bell company) on CD-ROM for Mac OS and Microsoft Windows. The stories are narrated by the host Mick. Glen Uslan, the Vice President of Active Imagination, intended the products to be affordable for customers, while retaining good quality. The company intended to have a total of 15 titles produced by the end of the year. By 1996, the company invested around $400,000 in additional titles.

== Games in the series ==
Title	Author	Release date	Number of pages	Notes
The Pirate Who Wouldn't Wash	Michael Salmon	January, 1995	11	
Milly Fitzwilly's Mouse Catcher	Marcia K Vaughan	1995	10	
The Friends of Emily Culpepper	Ann Coleridge	1995		
The Wrong Way Around the World	Kevin Hawley	1995		
The Little Engine	Julie Holland	1995		
The Yukadoos	Joy Cowley	1996		Received a 1996 Newsweek Editor's Choice Award.
There's a Dinosaur in the Garden	Michael Salmon	1996	11	

== Commercial performance ==
Packard sold its computer products that came with a CD that included three of six Kidstory software products. From the United States, the products were sold worldwide in Australia, New Zealand and parts of Europe and Asia. Packard also had the products translated in Japanese in an agreement with Fujitsu.

== Critical reception ==
Packard's Kidstory series was rated as an A+ Learning Library.

== See also ==
- Interactive storybook
