= Astro Algebra =

- Developer: Edmark
- Publisher: Edmark
- Platforms: Windows; Macintosh
- Release: 1997
- Genre: Educational

Astro Algebra is a 1997 educational video game developed and published by Edmark.

== Gameplay ==
The program begins by recruiting the player into the Astro Algebra Alliance as commander of the flagship Algebra Centauri, after which the crew and the onboard computer provide a welcome. The player may tour the bridge to set duty mode, with Off‑Duty mode allowing free exploration of ship areas and On‑Duty mode presenting algebra‑related missions. The game contains three main areas: the Grapher, where the player works with integers, number lines, coordinate pairs, slopes, intercepts, and graphing relationships; the Cargo Bay, where the player sorts objects and solves problems involving proportions, scale factors, order of operations, exponents, fractions, equivalent numbers, percents, and decimals; and VariaBlox, where the player constructs algebraic equations physically to complete missions involving combining like terms, modeling ratios, solving equations, substituting values, and factoring or multiplying expressions. The bridge also includes the Astronet encyclopedia, a calculator, and a Mission Log displaying the current assignment.

== Reception ==
Reception

Review scores
Publication	Score
All Game Guide	4/5
The Houston Chronicle	B+

Kids Domain called Astro Algebra a great program to help kids brush up on algebra during the summer months. SuperKids found that Astro Algebra provides fun math skills practice and concept reinforcement for students.
