= Millennium Auction =

- Developer: Eidolon
- Publisher: Eidolon
- Release: 1994

Millennium Auction is a 1994 video game published by Eidolon.

== Gameplay ==
Millennium Auction is a game in which the player is a bidder looking to acquire collector's items at the World Body Auction House in the year 2050. The game presents works of art and artifacts with an appraised value, and the player bids against the computer opponents in auctions for three rounds to acquire the greatest total value. The game features numerous video clips along with 3D-animated modeling and still photos, as well as digitized voices and classical music.

== Reception ==
James V. Trunzo reviewed Millennium Auction in White Wolf Inphobia #54 (April, 1995), rating it a 4 out of 5 and stated that "The theme of Millennium Auction is so narrow that sameness inevitably creeps in. It's the kind of game that I see myself playing for awhile, putting it on the shelf and coming back to it later."

John P. Withers for Electronic Games said that "for those with good hardware, and a bit of technical patience, Millennium Auction provides hours of strangely stimulating fun."

Allen L. Greenberg for Computer Gaming World rated the game for 3 stars and said that "Millennium Auction might be good bait to lure family and friends who have been unimpressed with gaming thus far."

== Reviews ==
- PC Gamer (1994 August)
- MikroBitti (1995-05)
- World Village (Gamer's Zone) (1997)
