= Zaark and the Night Team =

- Developer: EduConcept
- Publisher: Maxis
- Platform: Windows
- Release: 1995
- Genres: Educational, Adventure

Zaark and the Night Team is a 1995 series of two multimedia educational CD-ROMs subtitled: The Quest for Patterns and The Search for Symbols. It was developed by EduConcept and published by Maxis as part of their brand Software Toys For Kids.

== Critical reception ==
The Sydney Morning Herald wrote that the title was a "neat idea" that effectively incorporated information from different subjects. Obscuritory felt it was one of Maxis' "less-renowned and harder-to-explain" titles. Children's Software Revue deemed it "a program were going to need to spend some time with to fully understand". The Washington Post wrote "good intentions are lost to a miscalculation of young attention spans". The Jerusalem Post felt it was "intelligent and entertaining". AllGame gave The Quest for Patterns a rating of 3.5 out of 5 and called it "[...] a good game that has an equal mix of learning and fun." They gave The Search for Symbols the same rating and wrote: "Voices are what carries this game and will keep a childs attention."

== Legacy ==
Documents about this series are currently being held at the Computer History Museum. The game was discussed as part of SimEverything: Lessons in Curious Game Design from Maxis, panel about the history and philosophy of Maxis presented at the 2017 MAGFest.

It was included in the Power to the Little People Collection alongside Sim Town and Widget Workshop.

== See also ==
- Klik & Play
- Widget Workshop
