= Magic Tales: The Little Samurai =

- Developer: Animation Magic
- Publisher: Davidson & Associates
- Platforms: Windows; Macintosh
- Release: 1995

Magic Tales: The Little Samurai, also known as The Little Samurai, is a 1995 video game developed by Animation Magic and published by Davidson & Associates.

== Gameplay ==
The player follows a classic Japanese folk tale by moving through animated story pages filled with vibrant graphics, original music, and numerous clickable elements that trigger sound effects and small interactions, allowing the story to unfold at the player's own pace while building reading skills and confidence.

== Development and reception ==
Magic Tales: The Little Samurai had a budget of $450,000.

Games Domain liked the story and animations in Magic Tales: The Little Samurai. Computer Shopper called Magic Tales: The Little Samurai the most magical storybook they have ever seen.

Magic Tales: The Little Samurai was named one of the top 100 CD-ROMs by PC Magazine.
