= Mabu =

Mabu may refer to:

- Horse stance
- Mabu, Nepal, village in Ilam District, Mechi Zone
- Mount Mabu, Mozambique
- Atheris mabuensis, the Mount Mabu forest viper
- The Coachman (Mabu), a 1961 South Korean film
- A nickname for people named Mabel
- Mabu, a cultivar of Karuka
- Lil Mabu, A New York drill rapper

== Puerto Rico ==
- Mabú, a barrio of Humacao

== China ==
- Mabu, Anhui (麻埠镇), town in Jinzhai County
- Mabu, Jiangxi (马埠镇), town in Xiajiang County
- Mabu, Zhejiang (麻步镇), town in Pingyang County
