= Maabus =

1995 video game

- Developer: Microforum International
- Publisher: Monolith
- Platforms: MS-DOS, Windows 3.1x
- Release: 1995
- Genre: Action-adventure
- Mode: Single-player

Maabus is an action-adventure game developed by Canadian studio Microforum International and published by Monolith Productions in 1994.

== Gameplay ==
Maabus is a science‑fiction adventure set on a lush, mysterious island and features hostile creatures that appear along the player's path. Exploration is presented through navigable video, creating the sensation of moving through a three‑dimensional environment rather than viewing static scenes. These components are blended to form an interactive adventure that draws on environmental exploration, sudden encounters with enemies, and movement through video-based spaces.

== Development ==
Maabus was developed by Microforum International. Since its 1987 founding the Canadian studio had primarily manufactured and duplicated compact discs. The decision was made to transition into game production in 1992. Maabus was produced by the company's vice president Claudio Baiocchi, who also served as one of the story writers. Freelance writer Robin Rowland said that Microforum approached him about penning the game's scenario in the winter of 1993. Baiocchi described it as a "classic good-versus-evil plot." Development allegedly took 25,000 man-hours by 15 senior staff members. Its trailer, set to the song Think About the Way by Ice MC, claimed that the game required 9,800 hours of 3D animation rendering; 5,320 hours of programming; 3,000 hours of drawing; 1,000 hours of sound effects recording; 710 hours of music selections; 400 hours of video and audio recording; and 2,000 hours of testing. Microforum promoted Maabus at COMDEX in late 1994. Coming on three discs, the game utilized the Multimedia PC configuration. Microforum planned to release a full-screen MPEG version.

== Reception ==
Reception

Review scores
Publication	Score
Computer Game Review	65/100
Next Generation	1/5
PC Gamer (US)	55%
CD-ROM Today	2/5
CD-ROM Magazine	1.5/5
Electronic Entertainment	4/5
Entertainment Weekly	A−
Génération 4	💣 (less than 50%)
Joystick	110/200
PC Games	47%
PC Joker	32%
PC Player	36/100
Play Time	53%
Power Play	39%
Secret Service	80%

Next Generation reviewed the PC version of the game, rating it one star out of five, and stated that "unless looking at a handful of pretty pictures and dying in countlessly unpredictable ways is your idea of fun, spend your money on something else."

Bob Strauss of Entertainment Weekly gave the game an A− and described the game as a combination of Myst, Doom, and The 7th Guest. He wrote that the game is as addictive as any of the games from which it draws inspiration.

Trish Murphy for The Sydney Morning Herald said, "Despite its quirks, I found Maabus imaginative, challenging and great to play."

Allie West for CD-ROM Today felt that the time limit "adds a certain tension", but noted that "the overall drifting nature makes this ultimately monotonous".

CD-ROM Review rated the game a 4 out of 5 and called it an "exotic, compelling adventure game".

The game sold more than 100,000 copies.
