= Microforum International =

- Founded: 1985
- Headquarters: Canada
- Key people: Rick Winston (CEO and President)
- Number of employees: 25 (2000)
- Subsidiaries: Internet Frontier, Inc

Microforum International was a software distributor, Internet publisher, and vendor of electronic commerce services. It was also formerly a developer of entertainment and educational software.

== History ==
Microforum was founded in 1985. Since 1992, the company produced more than 65 CD-ROM games.

In February 1996, the company founded the Italian division: Microforum Italia.

In September 1996, the company went public.

In 1997, Rick Winston joined the company as CEO.

In 1997, the company had layoffs which resulted in the reduction of its workforce from 249 to 97. The same year the company combined its Web storefront with an electronic magazine called GamesMania.

GamesMania was one of the world's first online computer game magazines with traffic exceeding 650,000 hits per day.

in 2000, the company acquired Blue Hypermedia Inc., a Web development firm and new media production company for $14 million.

In August 2001, the company appointed Steven Schofield as the company's new CEO and Director. Steven served as president and CEO of Dell Financial Services, a joint venture between Tyco International Ltd. and Dell Computer Corp., from 1998 to 1999.

== Games ==
Year	Title	Platform(s)	Ref.
1995	Maabus	MS-DOS, Windows 3.1x	
1995	Expect No Mercy	Windows	
1996	Huygen's Disclosure	Windows	
1996	Mind Grind	Windows	
1996	SoulTrap	Windows	
1998	Armored Moon: The Next Eden	MS-DOS	

== Other Games ==
Year	Title	Platform(s)	Ref.
1997	Gothos	Windows	
