= Gus Goes to Cybertown =

1993 video game

Gus Goes To Cybertown
- Developer: Modern Media Ventures
- Publisher: Modern Media Ventures
- Engine: Proprietary
- Platforms: Windows 3.x (PC), Macintosh
- Release: 1993
- Genres: Educational, Puzzle
- Mode: Single-player

Gus Goes to Cybertown is a children's educational CD-ROM game released in 1993 by Modern Media Ventures. The main character is Gus, a talking and singing dog, who must find the three CyberBuds hiding in each of the town's five locations. Games are also hidden in each location, from spelling and number games to shape recognition and pattern matching games. Cybertown's park includes a timeline that shows Gus through time, from a Neanderthal to a futuristic spaceman. As the time changes, players can click on other items in the park to see them change as well. CyberBuds are revealed by interacting with various parts of each area. These characters will also provide tidbits of educational information. Upon completion of all in-game tasks, the player is treated to a final song on a "secret screen."

== Reception ==
Electronic Games gave the game an A, regarding the technical aspects as well taken care of, thus children would find it irresistible.

== Sequels ==
- Gus Goes to Cyberopolis (1994)
- Gus Goes to the Kooky Carnival (1995)
- Gus Goes to CyberStone Park (1996)
- Gus Goes to the Megarific Museum (1996)
- Gus and the CyberBuds Software SchoolHouse Collection (A 27-disk collection, 1996)
