= Science Sleuths =

Series of interactive videos for schools

Science Sleuths was a series of interactive videos that were produced by Videodiscovery, Inc. from 1991 to 1996. The series was first published on LaserDisc with accompanying manuals. Certain titles were later converted to the CD-ROM format.

The original Science Sleuths series included 24 episodes for middle school. An elementary school series was added later. Science Sleuths was distributed with the Science Plus curriculum from Holt, Rinehart and Winston. In 2005, Discovery Education purchased Videodiscovery and its Science Sleuths series.

Science Sleuths was released in middle school and elementary school versions:

- Science Sleuths: 24 interactive mysteries for middle-school that explore scientific problem solving in the context of different science subjects. Live-action video with actors, graphics, animations, photographs. Videodisc, 1992; CD-ROM, 1995. The series received the 1993 New York Film Festival Bronze Award for Interactive Multimedia; the 1993 National Educational Film & Video Festival Bronze Apple for Interactive Multimedia; and the 1995 Technology and Learning Software Award.
- Science Sleuths Elementary: 24 interactive mysteries for elementary school students. 1994, interactive videodisc, 1995, & CD-ROM, 1996. Science Sleuths Elementary was developed with Scholastic Corporation for their Science Place curriculum.
