= Castle Explorer =

1996 video game

- Developer: DK Multimedia
- Publisher: DK Multimedia
- Platforms: Windows, MacOS
- Genre: Educational

Castle Explorer is an educational video game by DK Multimedia, released in 1996 for Windows and Macintosh. It allows players to discover the inner workings of a castle structure within a medieval context. It is based upon the Incredible Cross-Sections: Castle book by illustrator Stephen Biesty and author Richard Platt.

The player is a page who is given the task of being a spy to enter the castle and gather information for the king.

The Vancouver Sun described it as "compelling, fascinating and informative". GeekOut UK thought it "wove RP and intrigue into the educational content". Feibel said it was "Elaborate, exciting, informative. Mandatory!". Sun Sentinel said the educational content was let down by poor gameplay. Meanwhile, a book that explored the series felt it was a good mix of the two.
