= Interactive storybook =

Type of children's book

An interactive storybook (or CD-ROM storybook) is a children's story packaged with animated graphics, sound or other interactive elements (e.g., word pronunciation). Such stories are usually published as software on CD-ROMs. They have also been referred to as computer books, picture book programs, books-on-disk, talking books, or living books.

This software is targeted at young readers (usually kindergarten to second grade) for educational purposes.

In their seminal work To Instruct and Delight: Children's and Young Adults' Literature on CD-ROM, H. Bennett wrote, "Something magical and non-threatening happens when a children's story weds a computer."

Children's Tech Review wrote that when a children's book comes to a touch screen, it can be called many names, including: “ebooks,” “living books,” “digital story books,” or even “app books.”

== Examples ==
- Disney's Animated Storybook
- Europress Bookshelf
- Living Books (including Wanderful Interactive Storybooks re-releases)
- Magic Tales
- Playtoons
- Reader Rabbit's Reading Development Library

== Pitfalls ==
There are studies indicating that some students will simply "cruise through" a story, either just playing with the graphics or not trying to read it themselves.

== See also ==
- Visual novel – Narrative-focused video game genre
