= Castle of the Winds =

1989 video game

Castle of the Winds II
- Developer(s): SaadaSoft (Rick Saada)
- Publisher(s): Epic MegaGames
- Artist(s): Paul Canniff
- Platform(s): Windows 3.x
- Release: 1989, 1992
- Genre(s): Roguelike
- Mode(s): Single-player

Castle of the Winds is a tile-based roguelike video game for Microsoft Windows. It was developed by Rick Saada in 1989 and distributed by Epic MegaGames in 1993. The game was released around 1998 as a freeware download by the author. Though it is secondary to its hack and slash gameplay, Castle of the Winds has a plot loosely based on Norse mythology, told with setting changes, unique items, and occasional passages of text. The game is composed of two parts: A Question of Vengeance, released as shareware, and Lifthransir's Bane, sold commercially. A combined license for both parts was also sold.

== Gameplay ==
The game differs from most roguelikes in a number of ways. Its interface is mouse-dependent, but supports keyboard shortcuts (such as 'g' to get an item). Castle of the Winds also allows the player to restore saved games after dying.

The game favors the use of magic in combat, as spells are the only weapons that work from a distance. The player character automatically gains a spell with each experience level, and can permanently gain others using corresponding books, until all thirty spells available are learned. There are two opposing pairs of elements: cold vs. fire and lightning vs. acid/poison. Spells are divided into six categories: attack, defense, healing, movement, divination, and miscellaneous.

Castle of the Winds possesses an inventory system that limits a player's load based on weight and bulk, rather than by number of items. It allows the character to use different containers, including packs, belts, chests, and bags. Other items include weapons, armor, protective clothing, purses, and ornamental jewellery. Almost every item in the game can be normal, cursed, or enchanted, with curses and enchantments working in a manner similar to NetHack. Although items do not break with use, they may already be broken or rusted when found. Most objects that the character currently carries can be renamed.

Wherever the player goes before entering the dungeon, there is always a town which offers the basic services of a temple for healing and curing curses, a junk store where anything can be sold for a few copper coins, a sage who can identify items and (from the second town onwards) a bank for storing the total capacity of coins to lighten the player's load. Other services that differ and vary in what they sell are outfitters, weaponsmiths, armoursmiths, magic shops and general stores.

The game tracks how much time has been spent playing the game. Although story events are not triggered by the passage of time, it does determine when merchants rotate their stock. Victorious players are listed as "Valhalla's Champions" in the order of time taken, from fastest to slowest. If the player dies, they are still put on the list, but are categorized as "Dead", with their experience point total listed as at the final killing blow. The amount of time spent also determines the difficulty of the last boss.

== Plot ==
The player begins in a tiny hamlet, near which they used to live. Their farm has been destroyed and godparents killed. After clearing out an abandoned mine, the player finds a scrap of parchment that reveals the death of the player's godparents was ordered by an unknown enemy. The player then returns to the hamlet to find it pillaged, and decides to travel to Bjarnarhaven.

Once in Bjarnarhaven, the player explores the levels beneath a nearby fortress, eventually facing Hrungnir, the Hill Giant Lord, responsible for ordering the player's godparents' death. Hrungnir carries the Enchanted Amulet of Kings. Upon activating the amulet, the player is informed of their past by their dead father, after which the player is transported to the town of Crossroads, and Part I ends. The game can be imported or started over in Part II.

The town of Crossroads is run by a Jarl who at first does not admit the player, but later (on up to three occasions) provides advice and rewards. The player then enters the nearby ruined titular Castle of the Winds. There the player meets his/her deceased grandfather, who instructs them to venture into the dungeons below, defeat Surtur, and reclaim their birthright. Venturing deeper, the player encounters monsters run rampant, a desecrated crypt, a necromancer, and the installation of various special rooms for elementals. The player eventually meets and defeats the Wolf-Man leader, Bear-Man leader, the four Jotun kings, a Demon Lord, and finally Surtur. Upon defeating Surtur and escaping the dungeons, the player sits upon the throne, completing the game.

== Development ==
Inspired by his love of RPGs and while learning Windows programming in the 80s, Rick Saada designed and completed Castle of the Winds. The game sold 13,500 copies. By 1998, the game's author, Rick Saada, decided to distribute the entirety of Castle of the Winds free of charge.

The game is public domain per Rick Saada's words:

Rick Saada, creator of Castle of the Winds, decided to give permission for anyone to distribute it for free. Epic doesn't have an exclusive license to sell it.

=== Graphics ===
All terrain tiles, some landscape features, all monsters and objects, and some spell/effect graphics take the form of Windows 3.1 icons and were done by Paul Canniff. Multi-tile graphics, such as ball spells and town buildings, are bitmaps included in the executable file. No graphics use colors other than the Windows-standard 16-color palette, plus transparency. They exist in monochrome versions as well, meaning that the game will display well on monochrome monitors.

The map view is identical to the playing-field view, except for scaling to fit on one screen. A simplified map view is available to improve performance on slower computers. The latter functionality also presents a cleaner display, as the aforementioned scaling routine does not always work correctly.

== Reception ==
Computer Gaming World rated the gameplay as good and the graphics simple but effective, while noticing the lack of audio, but regarded the game itself enjoyable.
