= Blown Away (video game) =

1994 video game

- Developer: Imagination Pilots
- Platform: Windows
- Release: 1994
- Genre: Puzzle

Blown Away is a 1994 puzzle video game. It is based on the 1994 film of the same name. Blown Away was developed by MGM Interactive (under the imprint Imagination Pilots) and published by IVI Publishing. It was MGM Interactive's first release.

== Gameplay ==
In Blown Away, the player takes the role of Jimmy Dove, a retired Boston Bomb Squad detective whose loved ones have been kidnapped by an Irish terrorist mastermind, a bomber named Justus. To rescue the hostages, the player must complete 22 puzzles and challenges, which include tasks ranging from simple word‑manipulation puzzles to more complex sequences such as operating valves to prevent explosive chemicals from combining. The game alternates between these interactive puzzle segments and live‑action video scenes that advance the story.

== Development ==
Blown Away is a product of Imagination Pilots, a Chicago-based company founded in 1993. The game stars actor Jimmie F. Skaggs as the villain Justus.

== Reception ==
Reception

Review scores
Publication	Score
PC Gamer (US)	79/100
Entertainment Weekly	B−
Joystick	69%
Power Play	68%
The San Francisco Examiner	B+
Świat Gier Komputerowych	6

Writing for Entertainment Weekly, Ty Burr contrasted it with Under a Killing Moon, calling both imperfect experiments at merging Hollywood filmmaking with computer games. According to Burr, Blown Away brought cinematic polish, professional actors, and energetic live-action sequences, but was weakened by uneven, poorly integrated puzzles that disrupted narrative flow. Burr concluded that such titles were appealing mainly to established gamers, but fell short of reaching a broader audience.

Bob Arctor previewed Blown Away for the French magazine Joystick. He was sharply dismissive of the game, describing it as a shallow, beginner-oriented point-and-click title that hid weak gameplay behind full-screen video. According to Arctor, the action-oriented premise served mainly as an excuse to string together a collection of tedious, unengaging puzzles borrowed from well-known traditional games, such as hangman, magic squares, and roulette.

Matt Firme, when reviewing Blown Away for PC Gamer (Vol. 2 No. 2 February 1995), gave it a score of 79%. Firme noted that the game was as a representative example of "multimedia" CD-ROM games, combining full-screen live-action video with interactive aspects of a video game. He found the video to be well rendered, and particularly praised the performance of actor Jimmie F. Skaggs, who he described as "memorably creepy". While he did not find much replay value in Blown Away's puzzles, he considered them generally well designed and varied, drawing comparisons to classic logic games such as The 7th Guest. He highlighted the inclusion of a "practice mode", allowing puzzles to be played independently of video sequences. However, Firme was critical of the game's overall cohesion. While the individual components—video clips and puzzles—functioned well on their own, he argued that they did not integrate smoothly into a compelling interactive experience, resulting in a repetitive "watch video, click hotspot, solve puzzle" structure. He felt that it was a very effective technological experiment, but did not offer much for casual players.

A review from the German Power Play magazine gave Blown Away a score of 68%. It characterizes Blown Away as a multimedia puzzle game loosely based on the titular film, and closely related in structure to recent Panic in the Park, but with a much stronger emphasis on explosions and bomb-defusal themes. The game is praised for its technically solid presentation, attractive graphics, and effective use of video sequences, with particular attention given to the charismatic and memorably malicious antagonist Justus, whose performance is compared favorably to film villain played by Dennis Hopper. Gameplay consists of a series of mini-games and logic puzzles, many of which are described as clever and demanding, though some are criticized for being extremely difficult or too reminiscent of earlier titles by the same developers. The game is regarded as a visually polished and competent multimedia title that reviewer believes will appeal especially to fans of puzzle games.

The reviewer for the Polish Świat Gier Komputerowych, Kamil Szafara, awarded it the scores of 9 (graphics), 8 (audio) and 6 (overall), considering the game to be a visually striking but somewhat uneven hybrid of puzzle, action, and light adventure mechanics. According to the reviewer, its strongest asset was its presentation. The core gameplay, the reviewer concluded, offered a solid logic–dexterity puzzle experience. However, the reviewer opined that while the game goes beyond pure logic puzzles by incorporating conversations, item collection, and limited interaction, its adventure component is too shallow. Overall, the review concludes that Blown Away is a competent and enjoyable game, with excellent graphics, high-quality video, fast pace, and varied puzzles that are offset by limited interactivity and an overly simplified adventure layer.

The San Francisco Examiner said that the game was surprisingly good, and he enjoyed it more than the movie itself, praising its "unique mix of game play" that focuses on complex puzzles, as well as full motion video integration. "For those looking for a fun interactive movie this fall, this may be the best one available".

Trish Murphy of The Sydney Morning Herald felt Blown Away was a deceptively subversive bomb-disposal puzzle game that disguised an intense intelligence test beneath the promise of explosive action. In her view, its core experience revolved around rapid-fire logical and arithmetic puzzles solved under strict time pressure, with alarms, timers, and visual cues serving to increase tension. Murphy praised the non-static puzzle design, wherein the puzzles change on each attempt, preventing rote memorization and rewarding genuine reasoning. She singled out the smooth full-screen video integration and "elegant" user interface for praise. Overall, Murphy felt that Blown Away succeeded not as an action spectacle, but as a puzzle game that lured players in with an action theme and kept them hooked through intellectual challenge.
