= Thinkin' Things =

Series of educational video games

- Genre: Edutainment
- Developer: Edmark Corporation
- Publisher: Edmark Corporation
- Platforms: Windows 3.x, Windows, Macintosh
- First release: Thinkin' Things Collection 1; 1993
- Latest release: Thinkin' Things: Toony the Loon's Lagoon; 1999
- Spin-offs: Thinkin' Science

Thinkin' Things is a series of educational video games by the Edmark Corporation and released for Windows and Mac in the 1990s. Entries in the series include Thinkin' Things Collection 1 (Formerly Thinkin Things) (1993), Thinkin' Things Collection 2 (1994), Thinkin' Things Collection 3 (1995), the adventure game Thinkin' Things: Sky Island Mysteries (1998), Thinkin' Things Galactic Brain Benders (1999), Thinkin' Things: All Around Frippletown (1999) and Thinkin' Things: Toony the Loon's Lagoon (1999).

== Gameplay ==
The Thinkin' Things series allows players to experiment and explore with interactive objects in different ways and methods throughout the games. This can be in the form of playing with shapes, patterns, motions, sound effects and music tunes. Every game has its own preset designs and demonstrations to give the player an idea of how the game works before the player can customize a design of their own. Some games also permit the player to record their own sounds with a microphone.

== Reception ==
=== Critical reception ===
TERC commented that two activities within Thinkin' Things Collection 1 have the opportunity to "provide variety and continued challenge". Computer Gaming World stated that it was "an excellent example of educational software ... a well-designed and creative program that really enhances learning". PC Player thought the game fell short due to its inferior graphics, sound, and gameplay. Teaching Children Mathematics deemed it "delightful".

Thinkin' Things Collection 2 was the 5th most popular title in the Macintosh category sold across seven Software Etc. stores in the Washington area in the week ending on December 28, 1996. New Straits Times commented that the activities in this version were targeted at an older demographic than its predecessor.

TERC posited that Thinkin' Things Collection 3 was not a traditional game due to having no story, impersonal characters, no overarching goals, and no competitive play, considering the title inferior to others that have these qualities. The New York Times thought the game was terrific, while the activities were superbly designed and beautiful. MacUser named Thinkin' Things Collection 3 the best children's software of 1995.

Alamo PC Organization said that Thinkin' Things: Sky Island Mysteries praised the game's ability to reward players for successfully completing activities, and for allowing parents to change the difficulty of challenges. SuperKids said the game stretches children's minds, encouraging them to learn and achieve. The Boston Herald thought it was a "point-and-click sleep-inducer".

Alamo PC Organization wrote that Thinkin' Things Galactic Brain Benders contained a "wonderful, colorful world full of excitement". Parent's Choice deemed the game a "winner".

Parent's Choice said Thinkin' Things: All Around Frippletown would be entertaining and challenging to the player. The Washington Post thought the game was "thought-promoting".

Parent's Choice explained that Thinkin' Things: Toony the Loon's Lagoon's activities had enough enjoyment to mask the fact that they were drawing "creativity, strategic skills and imagination" from the player. The Boston Herald wrote that the game contained a "fascinating and endlessly creative activity" called Flying Shapes.

=== Awards ===
By 1997, the series had won 18 awards.

| Year | Nominee / work | Award | Result |
|---|---|---|---|
| 1994 | Thinkin' Things Collection 1 | CODiE Award for Best Early Education Program | Won |
| 1996 | Thinkin' Things Collection 3 | CODiE Award for Best Education Software Program | Won |
| 1999 | Thinkin' Science Series: ZAP! | AIAS Award for Computer Educational Title of the Year (9-16 years) | Won |
| 1999 | Thinkin' Things: All Around FrippleTown | 15th Annual Editor’s Choice Award (Educational Software) | Won |
