= 3-D Body Adventure =

1994 educational video game

3D Body Adventure
- Developer: Knowledge Adventure
- Publisher: Levande Böcker
- Producer: Paul Chesis
- Designer: Don Button
- Platforms: MS-DOS, MacOS, Windows, Windows 3.x
- Release: Dec. 27, 1994: MS-DOS; 1995: Mac, Windows
- Genre: Educational
- Mode: Single-player

3-D Body Adventure is a 1994 educational video game developed by Knowledge Adventure and published by Levande Böcker i Norden for MS-DOS, Mac OS, Microsoft Windows.

In 2014, Jordan Freeman Group, a subsidiary of ZOOM, officially released the title amongst other Knowledge Adventure titles, having secured the exclusive rights to upgrade and re-release the company's back-catalog to play on modern machines.

Some copies of the game come in hexagon-shaped packaging.

== Gameplay ==
The program presents human anatomy through rotatable 3D graphics, allowing users to view body parts such as joints from multiple angles. It includes a theater area where the user can take guided journeys through different body systems. The software also contains an emergency‑room‑themed game section, which offers another mode of interaction with anatomical material. As children move through these sections, they encounter small pieces of information about various body parts, systems, and medical conditions, resulting in brief factual takeaways rather than extended lessons.

== Development and release ==
3-D Body Adventure was developed by Knowledge Adventure, a California-based company of programmers from Caltech and artists from the ArtCenter College of Design. The studio developed the game over six months from September 1993 to April 1994 at a budget of under $200,000. 3D rendering of the body parts was rendered using a SGI workstation. Development was undertaken with a team of doctors.

== Reception ==
Multimediokert felt the game gave them a headache. In a comprehensive analysis of the title, one thing that stood out to Bilden som roar och klargör was the "lack of aesthetics of the images quality, this is mainly due to the unclear presentation form". Superkids playtesters felt the game offered a more interesting journey through the human body than they'd experienced in school. Software for Teaching Science: A Critical Catalogue of Software for Science felt it would be a great way to encourage children's curiosity for anatomy.

It became one of Knowledge Adventure's flagship products, alongside their JumpStart series.

3-D Body Adventure was named one of the top 100 CD-ROMs by PC Magazine.
