= List of banned video games by country =

This is a list of video games that have been censored or banned by governments of various states in the world. Governments that have banned video games have been criticized for a correlated increase in digital piracy, limiting business opportunities and violating rights.

== Afghanistan ==
During the first reign of the Islamic Emirate government in Afghanistan (1996–2001), Western technology and art was prohibited and this included video games. Between 2001 and 2021, no video games were officially banned in Afghanistan, except for PlayerUnknown's Battlegrounds. In April 2022 Taliban spokesperson Inamullah Samangani confirmed that PlayerUnknown's Battlegrounds is still banned under the Taliban administration to 'protect younger generations from a bad influence'.

== Albania ==
In 2019, a ban on online gambling went to effect in Albania.

== Argentina ==
Carmageddon was banned in the capital city of Buenos Aires because it depicts people being killed by motor vehicles.

RapeLay was banned because it promotes and supports the use of violence to compel a person to submit to sexual conduct, as well as the exploitation of young people for sexual purposes.

Grand Theft Auto and Postal were banned in Rosario.

== Australia ==
By Australian law, all media is rated by the Australian Classification Board (ACB), with works potentially receiving MA15+ (Mature Accompanied 15+), R18+ (Restricted 18+), X18+ (Restricted 18+), or even denied at rating (RC, Refused Classification). The ratings are enforced by law, restricting retail sales of R18+ and X18+ works to adult consumers and preventing the sale or import of RC works. Penalties may vary up to 3 years in prison, or $200,000 in fines.

Until 2011, video games in Australia could only be rated up to MA15+. At the time, the R18+ classification rating could be given to films, but a video game with content deemed fitting for the R18+ rating would be classed as 'Refused Classification' due to an appropriate classification not being available for the medium. In July and August 2011, all Australian state Attorneys-General agreed to instate an R18+ rating for video games, which would be available by the end of 2011. Many games previously refused classification would now fit into the R18+ rating and, if the publisher chose to pay the reclassification fee, would theoretically be able to sell their game in Australia. The date was later changed to allow the rating to be introduced at the beginning of 2013.

Due to the licensing of the International Age Rating Coalition software for developers to rate their own game, several hundred games have been banned from various app stores as of 2015.

== Belgium ==
In Belgium, games such as Phantasy Star Online 2, FIFA 17, Gears of War 4, Mario Kart Tour, Call of Duty: Mobile and others have been banned due to the usage of loot boxes (which constitute gambling under the country's existing laws) and their equivalents. More are expected to be banned for the same reason.

== Brazil ==
Since 1999, Brazil has banned several video games, primarily due to depictions of violence and cruelty, making their distribution and sale illegal. The Brazilian advisory rating system requires all video games to be rated before they can be sold in the country. However, since 2022, developers are allowed to self-rate their games using rating symbols approved by the International Age Rating Coalition (IARC), provided the game is submitted through a participating digital storefront.

Bully was banned for showing violence and harassment in a school setting. The ban was lifted on 23 June 2016; the game can be acquired in physical and non-physical format through Steam.

Counter-Strike was banned because of violence and a map simulating a Favela in 2008. The ban was later lifted and the game is available for sale.

EverQuest was banned because the player is able to go on quests for both good and evil. The ban was later lifted.

Grand Theft Auto: Episodes from Liberty City was banned in Barueri because it uses music by the Brazilian composer Hamilton da Silva Lourenço without proper permission. It has been resolved and was lifted in 2012.

== China ==
A large number of games were banned throughout China. Home gaming consoles were banned in mainland China from June 2000 until 2013. When the ban was lifted, eighth-generation consoles such as the Xbox One and PlayStation 4 were allowed in the country.

As of April 2019, after implementing a new mandatory local rating and approval system, any and all games containing depictions of violence, blood, gambling and imperial history are de facto banned from all accessible platforms in the nation (unless otherwise changed to comply with local standards).

Notable games banned in this region are:

Name	Reason
Alliance of Valiant Arms	Banned because it contains blood, gore and vulgar content.
Animal Crossing: New Horizons	Animal Crossing: New Horizons was banned in mainland China since 10 April 2020. The game was pulled from Taobao as players created and posted anti-government messages in-game with a custom pattern tool. There has been no official announcement whether the ban was enforced by the Chinese government or by Taobao. However, the game is still on-sale on the Chinese grey market.
Battlefield 4	Banned for discrediting China's national image. The Chinese government claims that the game shows a "cultural invasion".
Command & Conquer: Generals	Banned for "smearing the image of China and the Chinese army", although the game presents China as a protagonist and glorifies the People's Liberation Army. Additionally, the China campaign has the player destroy questionable targets such as the Three Gorges Dam and the Hong Kong Convention and Exhibition Centre in order to snuff out an invading terrorist organization.
Devotion	Banned due to an easter egg insulting Chinese Communist Party general secretary Xi Jinping. The easter egg was later removed, but the game remains banned. On 21 February 2019, players discovered a fulu talisman decorating a wall in the game contained the words "Xi Jinping Winnie-the-Pooh" (Chinese: 習近平小熊維尼) in Chinese seal script, referencing a Chinese internet meme that compared him to the Disney character.
Football Manager 2005	Banned for recognizing Hong Kong, Taiwan and Tibet as independent countries. An edited version without them was later released globally.
Fortnite	Banned for containing blood, gore, and vulgar content.
Free Fire	Banned because it contains overly-revealing female characters, blood, gore, and vulgar content.
Hearts of Iron	Banned because it depicted disputed territories such as Tibet, Manchuria and Xinjiang as independent nations and because the island of Taiwan is shown to be under Japanese control.
I.G.I.-2: Covert Strike	Banned because of "intentionally blackening China and the Chinese army's image".
Paladins	Banned for containing overly-revealing female characters, blood, gore and vulgar content.
Plague Inc./Plague Inc. Evolved	Banned as a result of the COVID-19 pandemic.
PUBG: Battlegrounds	Banned for containing blood and gore. The game was too violent.
Roblox	Banned for "anti-communist propaganda".

== Cuba ==
No video games have ever been banned in Cuba, but few games were sold in that country until 2007 when restrictions were eased. In 2010, the video game Call of Duty: Black Ops generated a lot of controversy as there is a mission where the player attempts to assassinate Fidel Castro, only to end up killing a double.

== Germany ==
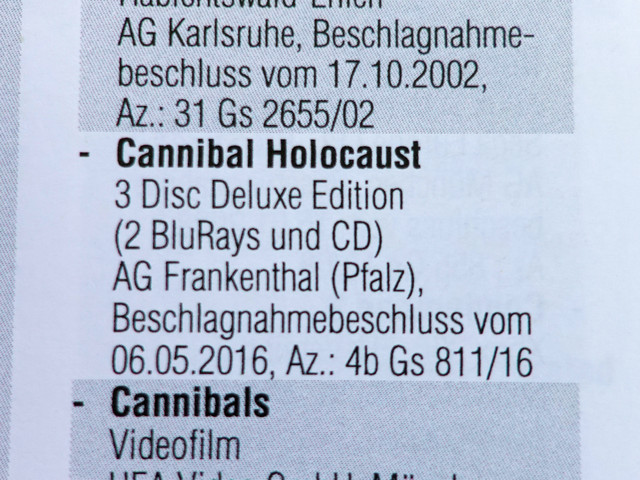
Example entry of a movie in the list of confiscated media in the official magazine "BPjMaktuell" (today "BzKJaktuell")

The list of confiscated video games was published as part of the official "BzKJaktuell" magazine by the Federal Agency for Child and Youth Protection in the Media. The list was last published in issue 1/22. No further list entries are known since then, although some titles have since been removed from the list.

Video games that have been confiscated by a court in Germany may no longer be sold, even to adults (however, private possession and use are permitted).

The list of confiscated media should not be confused with the List of Media Harmful to Young People (also known colloquially as The Index), as indexed video games are not considered banned. However, indexed video games are subject to strict restrictions and may only be offered and sold to adults.

From 2003 to April 2021, the List of Media Harmful to Young People was kept in four parts:

- Liste A contains physical media classified as harmful to minors (similar to an “adults only” rating).
- Liste B contains physical media which, in the opinion of the review panel, have criminal content.
- Liste C contains online media classified as harmful to minors (similar to an “adults only” rating).
- Liste D contains online media which, in the opinion of the review panel, have criminal content.

Liste C and Liste D contain online media and are not published because the content is accessible without barriers. These lists are contained as an encrypted database in online search engines or optionally in routers or youth protection filters.

Although inclusion in Liste B did not yet mean a ban, some titles were later confiscated by a court, so an entry on Liste B was often seen as a warning not to continue distributing the game in Germany (even if an entry in the Liste B is not a prerequisite for confiscation), although some games were moved to Liste A after a re-examination.

Video games that have been rejected by the Unterhaltungssoftware Selbstkontrolle are not banned. These games may also only be offered and sold to adults on the German market.

=== List of games confiscated by court in Germany ===
Name	Reason
Condemned: Criminal Origins	Added to the Liste B in April 2006. Confiscated by the district court of Munich in 2008 for violating German Criminal Code section 131 (depictions of violence).
Condemned 2: Bloodshot	Added to the Liste B in April 2008. Confiscated by the district court of Munich in 2008 for violating German Criminal Code section 131 (depictions of violence).
KZ Manager	Confiscated by the district court of Neu-Ulm in 1990 for violating German Criminal Code section 130 (incitement of the masses).
Manhunt	Added to the Liste B in March 2004. Confiscated by the district court of Munich in 2004 for violating German Criminal Code section 131 (depictions of violence).
Manhunt 2	Added to the Liste B in November 2008. Confiscated by the district court of Munich in 2010 for violating German Criminal Code section 131 (depictions of violence).
Scarface: The World Is Yours	Added to the Liste B in May 2007. Confiscated by the district court of Munich in 2007 for violating German Criminal Code section 131 (depictions of violence). A censored version was released.
Silent Hill: Homecoming	Added to the Liste B in August 2010. Confiscated by the district court of Frankfurt in 2010 for violating German Criminal Code section 131 (depictions of violence). A censored version was released.
Soldier of Fortune: Payback	Added to the Liste B in December 2007. Confiscated by the district court of Amberg in 2008 for violating German Criminal Code section 131 (depictions of violence). A censored version was released.
Wolfenstein	Added to the Liste B in October 2009. Confiscated by the district court of Detmold in 2010 for violating German Criminal Code section 86a (use of symbols of unconstitutional organisations) and section 131 (depictions of violence). A censored version was released but later withdrawn because an overlooked swastika was still present in the game.

Since 2018, several games have had their bans lifted.

Name	Reason
Commandos: Behind Enemy Lines	Confiscated by the district court of Kassel in 1999 for violating German Criminal Code section 86a (use of symbols of unconstitutional organisations). A censored version was released. Removed from the List of Media Harmful to Young People in May 2024.
Dead Rising	Added to the Liste B in September 2006. Confiscated by the district court of Hamburg in 2007 for violating German Criminal Code section 131 (depictions of violence). The ban was lifted in February 2018 but remains on the List of Media Harmful to Young People.
Dead Rising 2	Added to the Liste B in December 2010. Confiscated by the district court of Bautzen in 2011 for violating German Criminal Code section 131 (depictions of violence). The ban was lifted in February 2018 but remains on the List of Media Harmful to Young People.
Left 4 Dead 2	Added to the Liste B in December 2009. Confiscated by the district court of Berlin-Tiergarten in 2010 for violating German Criminal Code section 131 (depictions of violence). A censored version was released. The ban was lifted in May 2018 and removed from the List of Media Harmful to Young People in January 2021. The uncensored version was then given an "18+" rating.
Mortal Kombat (1992)	The versions for the Sega Mega Drive, Sega CD, Sega Master System and Sega Game Gear were confiscated by the district court of Munich in 1994 for violating German Criminal Code section 131 (depictions of violence). The censored versions for the Super Nintendo and Game Boy were allowed for distribution. The ban was lifted in October 2019 and removed from the List of Media Harmful to Young People in March 2020.
Mortal Kombat (2011)	Added to the Liste B in May 2011. Confiscated by the district court of Duisburg in 2012 for violating German Criminal Code section 131 (depictions of violence). Removed from the List of Media Harmful to Young People in July 2024.
Mortal Kombat II	Confiscated by the district court of Munich in 1995 for violating German Criminal Code section 131 (depictions of violence). The ban was lifted in October 2019 and removed from the List of Media Harmful to Young People in March 2020.
Mortal Kombat 3	Confiscated by the district court of Munich in 1997 for violating German Criminal Code section 131 (depictions of violence). The ban was lifted in November 2019 and removed from the List of Media Harmful to Young People in August 2020.
Mortyr	Confiscated by the district court of Munich in 2001 for violating German Criminal Code section 86a (use of symbols of unconstitutional organisations). A censored version was released. Removed from the List of Media Harmful to Young People in October 2024.
Wolfenstein 3D	Confiscated by the district court of Munich in 1994 for violating German Criminal Code section 86 (Dissemination of propaganda material of unconstitutional organisations) and 86a (Use of symbols of unconstitutional organisations). The ban was lifted in August 2019 and removed from the List of Media Harmful to Young People in October 2019 on grounds of social adequacy. The uncensored version was then given an "16+" rating.

=== List of games added to the Liste B by the Federal Agency for Child and Youth Protection in the Media in Germany ===
Name	Reason
Aliens vs. Predator (2010)	Added to the Liste B in May 2010.
Call of Duty: World at War	Added to the Liste B in January 2009. A censored version was released.
Carmageddon: Max Damage	Added to the Liste B in April 2017.
Dead Rising 2: Off the Record	Added to the Liste B in October 2011.
Dead Rising 3	Added to the Liste B in December 2013.
Dead Rising: Chop Till You Drop	Added to the Liste B in May 2009.
Hatred	Added to the Liste D in April 2016. While the game itself is only on the List of Media Harmful to Young People with a reminder that the game is potentially violating German Criminal Code section 131 (depictions of violence) a series of 7 walkthrough videos have been Confiscated by the district court of Berlin-Tiergarten in December 2016 for the same criminal code.
The House of the Dead: Overkill	Added to the Liste B in May 2009.
Killing Floor	Added to the Liste B in October 2009. A censored version was released.
NecroVisioN	Added to the Liste B in July 2009. A censored version was released.
Ninja Gaiden II	Added to the Liste B in August 2010.
Painkiller: Resurrection	Added to the Liste B in April 2010. A censored version was released.
Postal	Added to the List of Media Harmful to Young People in June 1998. Added to the Liste B in March 2008.
Postal 2: Apocalypse Weekend	Added to the Liste B in September 2005.
Resident Evil: Operation Raccoon City	Added to the Liste B in July 2012. A censored version was released.
Saints Row 2	Added to the Liste B in October 2008. A censored version was released.
The Punisher (2005)	Added to the Liste B in May 2005.
X-Men Origins: Wolverine	Added to the Liste B in September 2009.

Some games were added to the Liste B and later transferred to Liste A or removed from the List of Media Harmful to Young People altogether.

Name	Reason
Call of Duty: Black Ops	Added to the Liste B in November 2010. A censored version was released. Transferred to Liste A in January 2011.
Dead Island	Added to the Liste B in November 2011. Transferred to Liste A in January 2012. Removed from the List of Media Harmful to Young People in January 2019. The uncensored version was then given an "18+" rating.
Left 4 Dead	Added to the Liste B in December 2008. A censored version was released. Removed from the List of Media Harmful to Young People in April 2021. The uncensored version was then given an "18+" rating.
Medal of Honor (2010)	Added to the Liste B in December 2010. A censored version was released. Transferred to Liste A in April 2011.
Mortal Kombat: Armageddon	Added to the Liste B in January 2007. Transferred to Liste A in April 2007. The Premium Edition was added to the Liste B in December 2009. The Premium Edition was transferred to Liste A in March 2010. All versions were removed from the List of Media Harmful to Young People in May 2023.
Painkiller: Battle Out of Hell	Added to the Liste B in April 2005. A censored version was released. Removed from the List of Media Harmful to Young People November 2017.
Shellshock 2: Blood Trails	Added to the Liste B in May 2009. Transferred to Liste A in October 2015.
Sleeping Dogs	Added to the Liste B in October 2012. A censored version was released. Transferred to Liste A in January 2015.

== Greece ==
The Law 3037/2002 banned all electronic games in public places in the hopes that it would fight illegal gambling in the country. It was repealed in 2011.

== India ==
On 22 October 2008, Microsoft announced that Fallout 3 would not be released in India for the Xbox 360 platform. Religious and cultural sentiments were cited as the reason. Although the specific reason was not revealed, it is possible that it is because the game contains two-headed mutated cows called Brahmin, which was considered sensitive to religious beliefs. Brahmin is the name of a social class of Hindu priests and religious scholars. The spelling of Brahmin is also similar to Brahman which connotes the highest universal principle, the Ultimate Reality of the universe in Hinduism.

Following concerns that the violence depicted in PUBG Mobile would affect youth detrimentally, the game was first banned in the cities of Ahmedabad, Surat, Vadodara, Bhavnagar and Rajkot of Gujarat, as well as in the entire region of Jammu and Kashmir. Under the initial terms, players could be prosecuted for playing the game. The game was later banned nationwide due to mishandling of data on 2 September 2020, along with Rules of Survival, Mobile Legends: Bang Bang and Clash of Kings as a part of the Indian government's ban on 59 Chinese-owned apps following the border skirmishes between the two countries. Later, an India-exclusive version of PUBG Mobile that complied with data rules, Battlegrounds Mobile India was released by Krafton. Free Fire was banned in India following government action against apps linked to Chinese companies, citing national security and data privacy concerns. The game was removed from app stores as part of broader restrictions affecting multiple digital services associated with China.

== Indonesia ==
Mortal Kombat 11 is banned in Indonesia because of excess violence and gore as well as depiction of communist symbolism, which is strictly banned in the country.

== Iran ==
1979 Revolution: Black Friday focuses on the Iranian Revolution of 1979 and was banned for presenting "false and distorted information" regarding the revolution, and for being anti-Iranian.

ARMA 3 was banned due to the game's portrayal of a fictional faction, which includes Iran and is an enemy of NATO.

Battlefield 3 was banned because it presented a fictional U.S. invasion on Iran. Even before the ban, many retail stores were removing copies of the game from their shelves.

Clash of Clans was banned because it encourages violence, tribal war and is extensively addictive, as the government states.

Call of Duty: Mobile's services were cancelled by developer Activision for unspecified reasons, but thought to involve United States sanctions against Iran.

Pokémon Go was banned due to security reasons.

Minecraft became unavailable in Iran due to Microsoft’s compliance with U.S. sanctions and international legal requirements affecting software and online services.

== Iraq ==
PlayerUnknown's Battlegrounds was banned because of perceived negative effects caused by some electronic games on the health, culture, and security of Iraqi society. However, the ban is not in effect in Iraq anymore, reverted by a new prime ministerial ruling. In 2025, the game Roblox was banned after concerns of child safety and encouraging violence, and it happens after the Schlep Case that had shown attention to the cases to the attack of predators on minors on the platform.

== Republic of Ireland ==
The IFCO rarely rates video games and leaves decisions to PEGI and the BBFC. Manhunt 2 was banned for "gross, unrelenting and gratuitous violence", but the ban was later lifted and the game was given a PEGI 18 rating.

== Italy ==
In 2006, following the release of the trailer to the game Rule of Rose, the magazine Panorama ran an article claiming live burials of children at the protagonist's hand. Shortly after, then-mayor of Rome, Walter Veltroni, called for a ban of the game in Italy. The game's European publisher, 505 Games, dismissed these claims, and the game was not banned following Veltroni's comments.

In 2007, following the decision of the governments of the United Kingdom and Ireland, the Minister of Communications Paolo Gentiloni publicly expressed the desire to ban the distribution of Manhunt 2 in Italy, due to the gratuitous violence and excessive cruelty in the video game, but the ban was never put into practice.

== Japan ==
Video games are rarely banned in Japan, and it holds the place as one of the top video game producers in the world. However, for some games, usually western, they may edit or censor their games if they appear offensive to Japan, an example being the Japanese release of Fallout 3. "The Power of the Atom" quest was edited to relieve concerns about atomic detonation in inhabited areas and the Fat Man weapon was renamed to the Nuka Launcher due to its relation to the real historic event. Another example is the Japanese version of Crash Bandicoot 2: Cortex Strikes Back in which a death animation that has Crash squashed into a head and feet was altered due to its resemblance to the Kobe child murders. Japan's Spike removed all references to Kim Jong-il and North Korea in Homefront, as well. Resident Evil 4, Call of Duty: Black Ops, Bulletstorm, Gears of War 3, Grand Theft Auto V, Dead Island, Metal Gear Rising: Revengeance, Just Cause 2 and numerous other violent titles, distributed physically and digitally, were heavily edited for excessive violence, but only on the localization level; the games can still be played if the locale is switched from Japanese to English. On 13 March 2019, the sales of Judgment had stopped producing future sales in Japan, following Pierre Taki's arrest on suspicion of cocaine use. As a result, Sega had replaced both the voice actor and the character model having been subsequently removed. As of November 2022, video game The Callisto Protocol has been banned in Japan. CERO would not be rating due to the game's violent content and the developer refused to make the necessary changes. Previously, the Dead Space series encountered the same fate, with all entries since the original 2008 release effectively being banned in Japan.

== Malaysia ==
Malaysia tends to ban offensive content such as extreme-impact violence, depictions of cruelty, any content considered anti-Muslim, sexual content and nudity. In August 2008, after the Grand Theft Auto series ban in Thailand (see below), head of a Malaysian consumer rights organization, Muhammad Idris, called for the ban of the entire Grand Theft Auto series and other similarly violent video games such as the Manhunt series and Mortal Kombat.

In September 2017, the Malaysian Communications and Multimedia Commission (MCMC) blocked access to the entire Steam store following the discovery of a controversial fighting game involving religious deities, Fight of Gods. The ban was lifted one day later after Valve agreed to block the game in Malaysia.

== Mexico ==
Tom Clancy's Ghost Recon Advanced Warfighter 2 was banned in the state of Chihuahua due to Mexican rebels being depicted as antagonists and stereotyping the cities of Chihuahua City and Ciudad Juárez. However, the game could still be found in shelves in other federal entities.

== Nepal ==
PUBG was banned because of delinquency issues involving youths. Currently, the ban has been lifted.

== New Zealand ==
In New Zealand, games are classified by the country's Office of Film and Literature Classification. If they are dubbed "objectionable" in all cases, they are banned. In this case, the game in question is not only illegal to sell, but also to own, possess, or import. Penalties may vary up to 2 years in prison, or $100,000 in fines. Games are typically banned and classified as "objectionable content" when they contain extreme violence, offensive depictions of cruelty, animal cruelty, sexual content involving minors, or graphic depictions of sexual content, including sexual fetishes that are "revolting or abhorrent" (such as depictions of urination, bestiality, necrophilia, urophilia, coprophilia, and/or incest).

Name	Reason
Criminal Girls: Invite Only	Banned for "sexual content that focuses on young persons and elements of sexual violence". This ban extends to digital distributions.
Gal Gun: Double Peace	Banned because "it tends to promote and support both the exploitation of children and young people, and the use of coercion to compel a person to submit to sexual conduct". Ban extends to digital distributions.
Manhunt	Banned for "extreme violence and offensive depictions of cruelty". Ban was lifted in 2023 with an R18 classification.
Manhunt 2	Banned for "extreme violence and offensive depictions of cruelty". Ban was lifted in April 2024 for both the censored and uncensored versions with an R18 classification.
Postal 2	Banned for "gross, abhorrent content: Urination, High Impact Violence, Animal Cruelty, Homophobia, Racial and Ethnic Stereotypes". This ban extends to digital distributions.
Postal 2 demo	Banned for "promoting and supporting the use of urine in association with degrading and humiliating conduct, and promoting and supporting the infliction of extreme violence and extreme cruelty".
Postal 2: Share the Pain	Banned for "promoting and supporting the use of urine in association with degrading and humiliating conduct, and promoting and supporting the infliction of extreme violence and extreme cruelty".
The Shitposter	Video game based on the Christchurch mosque shootings. Banned for "promoting extremist ideologies and facilitating the targeting of civilians". It was declared as a "terrorist publication" by the Classification Office.
Reservoir Dogs	Banned because it "tends to promote and support the infliction of extreme violence and extreme cruelty for the purpose of entertainment". Ban was lifted in July 2024 with an R18 classification.
Three Sisters' Story	Banned because it "tends to promote and support the use of violence to compel a person to submit to sexual conduct, and the exploitation of young persons for sexual purposes".

== Oman ==
Oman banned Roblox in 2021, citing concerns about the safety and protection of its younger population.

== Pakistan ==
On 1 July 2022, the Pakistan Telecommunication Authority banned PlayerUnknown's Battlegrounds (PUBG) after a teenager allegedly shot his family of four after bingeing on the video game for days. The ban caused turmoil among the youth, whose protests mounted pressure against the regulator. It was eventually unbanned after nearly a month.

Games such as Call of Duty: Black Ops II and Medal of Honor have also been banned in Pakistan due to their portrayal of the country as a failed state where terrorist organizations openly operate.

== Philippines ==
In 1981, a presidential decree issued by Ferdinand Marcos outlawed the use and distribution of video game consoles, arcade games and pinball machines, deeming them as a "destructive social enemy" and "to the detriment of the public interest".

Defense of the Ancients, has been banned in a barangay in Dasmariñas, Cavite following complaints of delinquency issues, and two murder incidents involving youths in the area resulting from brawls in relation to the game. The ban, however, only covers internet cafes and does not extend to privately-and-individually-owned PCs in private homes.

The indie sandbox game GoreBox was temporarily banned in June 2026 after one of the suspects of the 2026 Tacloban school shooting was discovered to be an avid player of the game. The game is R18 and is noted for depiction of blood and dismemberment leading authorities that its blood and dismemberment depictions could condition minors to violence. On August 26, the Department of Information and Communications Technology (DICT) issued a statement that the ban came after a mutual agreement with the developers and not a unilateral action by the government.

== Qatar ==
In 2001, Sheikh Yusuf al-Qaradawi issued a fatwa banning Pokémon from Qatar on the basis that the game would challenge belief in the Muslim faith.

On 13 August 2025, Roblox is permanently blocked due to concerns over child safety following online protests for government action. Although the application remains available for download on app stores, users cannot progress beyond the home screen, and the web version similarly returns an error.

== Russia ==
In Russia, games are classified by the "On Countering Extremist Activity" federal law and are included in the "Federal List of Extremist Materials".

Media in the United States and Europe have incorrectly reported that Call of Duty: Modern Warfare 2, which features a storyline in which Russian ultra-nationalists take control of the country and invade the United States, was banned in Russia. Activision called these reports "erroneous". Instead, a censored version of the game was published, omitting the controversial "No Russian" level. This also presumably prevented the game from being released on consoles in Russian, with only a PC version officially available.

Because of the Russian invasion of Ukraine, few games are being released because many game developers are ceasing operations in Russia.

Name	Reason
BoneTown	The Steam release had been banned from sale to Russian users by order of the Russian Government contacting Steam to stop selling it.
Call of Duty: Modern Warfare	Not officially banned, but Sony Interactive Entertainment refused to sell the game digitally on PlayStation 4. The game also never released in Russia on discs.
For Freedom Ichkeriya: BAMUT	Banned because of "justifying the implementation of extremist activities: incitement to ethnic and religious hatred, intended to form a hostile attitude towards soldiers of the Russian army as "occupants", "aggressors", and towards Russians by nationality as invaders. has signs of inciting ethnic hatred: Chechens are contrasted with Russians"
S.T.A.L.K.E.R. 2: Heart of Chornobyl	GSC Game World, the developer of the S.T.A.L.K.E.R. game series has been declared an “undesirable organization” by the Prosecutor General’s Office. The reason given was that “S.T.A.L.K.E.R. 2: Heart of Chornobyl” tells Ukrainian narratives and produces anti-Russian content, and that GSC has supported the Ukrainian military with donations. Players who purchase the game after the ban could face a fine or up to 5 years in prison.
Tell Me Why	Not officially banned, but Xbox Game Studios decided to not release it in Russia due to one of the main protagonists of the game being transgender, which would likely be viewed as inappropriate by the Russian government. The game was also not released in several other countries for the same reason, including China, Indonesia, Kuwait, Malaysia, Pakistan, Peru, Qatar, Saudi Arabia, Singapore, Turkey, United Arab Emirates, and Ukraine.
Schedule I	Delisted on Steam by the developers due to Roskomnadzor starting an investigation of the game.

== Saudi Arabia ==
Most banned games can be found in many stores due to a lack of government enforcement of bans (often at a substantial price). However, not all major stores will stock banned titles.

Name	Reason
Final Fantasy XVI	
The Last of Us Part II	
Grand Theft Auto V	Banned due to depictions of violence, drug use, and explicit sexual content. It is also rumored to be linked to two suicides in the Kingdom associated with the Blue Whale Challenge. However, on July 17, 2025, it has been unbanned and has been given the new age rating of 21+.
Resident Evil 5 and 6	Banned during the Blue Whale Challenge panic, no reason given.
Pokémon and Pokémon Go	In 2001, Sheikh Abdulaziz bin Abdullah, the Grand Mufti of Saudi Arabia, issued a fatwa banning Pokémon in Saudi Arabia on the basis that it promotes gambling and that the cards contain symbols resembling "the star of David, which everyone knows is connected to international Zionism and is Israel's national emblem". He also claimed that other symbols on the cards promoted Freemasonry and Christianity. The ban was revived in 2016 to apply to Pokémon Go.

== Singapore ==
Singapore has banned games in the past and still occasionally does (including a ban on arcades nationwide from 1983 to the 1990s). With the implementation of the Video Game Classification in 2008 by the Media Development Authority, most games are widely available for purchase to their respective age group, such as those containing full frontal nudity or strong graphic violence under an "M18" rating. Games that were previously banned such as Mass Effect were re-rated either "Age Advisory" or "M18" after the implementation of the classification system.

Name	Reason
Half-Life	Banned because of violence. The ban was met with uproar as the local gaming community and retailers scrambled to start petitions to save the game. The government decided to lift the ban after a week, as the game had been released for more than a year and the ban would impact the local LAN gaming and retail market.
Mass Effect	Banned because of a homosexual encounter between a feminine alien and female human. The ban was later lifted and the title re-rated M18.
The Darkness	Banned because of excessive violence. The ban was later lifted and the title re-rated M18.

== South Korea ==
Since 2006, South Korea has only banned video games on rare occasions. Even before this, games were very rarely banned unless that game mentioned elements of the Korean War in order to avoid tensions between the countries North Korea and South Korea. However, Manhunt, Manhunt 2, and Mortal Kombat are still banned because of violence and cruelty. Grand Theft Auto III, Grand Theft Auto: Vice City and Mercenaries: Playground of Destruction were previously banned, but the bans were later lifted.

The Game Rating Board requires that all video games be rated by the organization. Unrated titles are banned from being sold in the country, and websites selling them can be blocked.

Name	Reason
Mortal Kombat (2011)	Banned because of excessive violence and cruelty.
Tom Clancy's Splinter Cell: Chaos Theory	Banned for portraying military and political actions against North Korea, ban was lifted in 2007.
Homefront	Banned for portraying a unified Korea under Northern rule by Kim Jong-un along with its negative perception of Korean citizens. The ban of this game remains as of 2026.
Tom Clancy's Ghost Recon 2	Banned for portraying military and political actions against North Korea, ban was lifted in 2007.
Mercenaries: Playground of Destruction	Banned for portraying military and political actions against North Korea, ban was lifted in 2007.
Danganronpa V3: Killing Harmony	Danganronpa V3 was slated for a September 2017 release in South Korea, but the GRAC rejected it for "anti-social depection". News media speculated that a child murder in Incheon in March 2017 affected this decision, but the organization denied it.

== Tajikistan ==
In November 2024 Tajikistan banned both GTA and Counter-Strike. The Ministry of Interior of Tajikistan has banned both games on the grounds that they incite crime.

== Thailand ==
Since August 2008, all video game titles of the Grand Theft Auto series have been completely banned in Thailand, because of a case where an 18-year-old Thai player supposedly influenced by Grand Theft Auto killed a taxi driver from Bangkok. The ban, however, does not extend to the digital PC versions of Grand Theft Auto V.

Tropico 5 is yet another banned title. The ruling military junta at the time claimed that it could "affect peace and order" within the country.

Fight of Gods is banned due to blasphemous content against buddhism.

== United Arab Emirates ==
In the United Arab Emirates, a branch of the government called the National Media Council (NMC) works to control the media and entertainment industry in the country, and they have the authority to issue bans on any specific media products, including video games, to comply with the country's legal and cultural values. Usually, the NMC do not explicitly state their actual consensus for any kind of issued ban on a product, so official reasons behind their bans remain unclear. However, bans issued by the NMC apply only to the sale of those products through local outlets; they do not make private ownership illegal. There are certain exceptions, notably for Spec Ops: The Line (see below). Some banned games may be available and sold on the nation's grey market.

In 2018, the NMC introduced a localised rating system for various media, including video games.

The following titles are banned from mainstream physical retail. However, unlike Saudi Arabia, most of these games can still be seen on digital storefronts such as the PlayStation Store.

Name	Reason
BlazBlue: Continuum Shift	Banned likely due to suggestive and revealing outfits on some characters. However, the ban did not extend to digital versions of the game.
Darksiders	Banned likely due to contradicting with customs and traditions.
Dead Island and Dead Island: Riptide	Both banned likely due to "extreme depictions of violence and scantily-clad game characters".
Dead Rising 2	Banned likely due to violence, gambling, and nudity.
Dragon Age: Origins	Banned likely due to sexual themes, including possible homosexual relationships.
Fallout: New Vegas	Banned likely due to gambling and sexual themes. It has since been lifted.
Gal Gun: Double Peace, Gal Gun 2	Both banned likely due to sexual themes. However, the ban did not extend to the digital versions of the games.
The Godfather II	Banned likely due to nudity.
God of War series	The first title in the series was banned after complaints were filed regarding religious and sexual content in the game, and subsequently, the next seven games in the series were banned for similar reasons The 2018 title God of War was the first entry to be legally approved for release in the U.A.E.
Grand Theft Auto series	For unknown reasons, Grand Theft Auto: San Andreas has been available via Steam ever since the PC version of Grand Theft Auto V was launched, which itself is openly available on Steam from the debut. Shortly after Steam introduced the dirham as the official currency for U.A.E. user accounts on 10 November 2015, The ban on Grand Theft Auto V was later lifted on July 17, 2025,
Heavy Rain	Banned likely due to graphic violence, sexual content, nudity and a sultry seduction scene.
Injustice: Gods Among Us	Despite being initially marketed for Middle Eastern distribution under the title of Injustice: The Mighty Among Us, the game failed to surpass the NMC's censors for a period of time, and was banned likely due to the case package and on-disc software title itself being identical to its European release, with the term "God" retained (the official reason was not given). The game had been demonstrated at various events in the U.A.E. without incident for many months before the official release date. However, the ban on the title has since been lifted.
The Last of Us Part II	Banned due to homosexual-related content.
Mafia II	Banned likely due to excessive violence and nudity.
Max Payne 3	Banned likely due to excessive violence and sexual themes. The ban was issued roughly three weeks after the official release. The ban has since been lifted for digital versions of the game.
Red Dead Redemption	Was initially banned, likely due to nudity. The ban was lifted two months after the official release date.
Roblox	Was banned in 2018 likely due to content deemed harmful for children. The ban was later lifted on 2021. All chat features on Roblox was disabled on September 5, 2025, in the UAE.
Saints Row: The Third, Saints Row IV	Both banned because of sexual themes, excessive violence, and use of drugs and alcohol.
Spec Ops: The Line	Banned likely due to the game's fictional depiction of the UAE's real-life city of Dubai in a state of ravage and destruction. Unlike other banned video games, the NMC had extended their focus for this title going far as to issue the TRA to block the game's official website and subsequently prevent the title from being distributed throughout the rest of the GCC, as well as Jordan, and Lebanon. Even local retailers, such as Geekay Games, are unable to sell the game via their online shops to UAE residents.
Watch Dogs, Watch Dogs 2	Watch Dogs' ban did not extend to the DLC, and is only available on non-Steam distributors, furthermore, this version of the ban extends throughout the GCC while the ban for Watch Dogs 2 has been lifted.
Gacha Life	Gacha Life faces heavy restrictions in the UAE primarily due to external community content being deemed harmful to minors.

== United Kingdom ==
Games in the UK usually only fail to receive a certification rating (effectively a ban) when they contain real sex scenes and/or gratuitous violence. BBFC age ratings are compulsory and backed by legislation, taking effect 30 July 2012. It is illegal to sell, buy or rent, but not import, a game that has not been classified by an approved age rating organisation in the UK. This only applies to games stored on physical media, not downloadable media.

Name	Reason
Carmageddon	The BBFC originally refused to certify the game's uncut form. Was subsequently altered to replace pedestrians with zombies. The refusal was later overturned on appeal, and a patch was released to restore the original human content.
Fursan al-Aqsa: The Knights of the Al-Aqsa Mosque	Inciting violence and terrorism.
Manhunt 2	The uncut version was the only game to be refused classification by the BBFC (therefore banned), due to excessive graphic violence and cruelty. After this, a modified version was made and submitted for certification – this was initially refused classification as well, but was allowed to be sold after an appeal (despite a successful challenge to this ruling).
Omega Labyrinth Z	Banned by the Video Standards Council (despite the game having a PEGI 18 rating) because of interactive sexual activity involving a person who is, or appears to be, a minor.
The Punisher	The version of the game that had been edited for the American market was further censored for the British release. The interrogation scenes were deemed graphically controversial and changes were made at the request of the BBFC to further mask these scenes. The edited version received an 18 certificate.
Sex Vixens from Space	Not submitted to the BBFC, but in 1989, official shipments of copies were seized by customs and destroyed in order to "protect the youth of today".

== United States ==
In the United States of America, the Entertainment Software Rating Board (ESRB)—a self-regulatory organization—issues ratings for video games and enforces voluntary regulations on how they are marketed and sold. The Supreme Court ruled in Brown v. Entertainment Merchants Association—which challenged a California law restricting the sale of "violent video games" (defined using a variation of the Miller test separate from ratings assigned by bodies such as the ESRB) to minors, insisting that video games were considered a protected form of expression under the First Amendment, meaning that federal or state law cannot be used to regulate their distribution based on content.

However, games can still be recalled as the result of court orders; a nude model featured in The Guy Game sued its developer and publisher over use of her likeness, as she was underage at the time of filming and thus could not personally consent to her depiction. All remaining copies of the game that contained her likeness were recalled from stores. In 1989, a court found that the Tengen version of Tetris for the Nintendo Entertainment System had violated Nintendo's exclusive right to publish home console versions of Tetris, ordering Atari Games to recall the game and destroy all remaining copies. In 2012, a court found that Silicon Knights had plagiarized Epic Games' proprietary Unreal Engine, and had used it in Too Human and X-Men: Destiny, along with other unreleased projects. The studio was ordered to recall and destroy all remaining copies, materials, and source code relating to the games.

The ESRB's highest rating, "Adults Only", has been considered a total ban on the mainstream sale of certain games, as most retailers refuse to stock games carrying the rating, and they cannot be published on major video game consoles due to company policies. The release of Thrill Kill, an AO-rated fighting game with extreme violence and strong sexual themes, was outright cancelled by Electronic Arts (who had acquired its developer) due to objections over its content. Following the discovery of an incomplete sex minigame that was not included in the final game but was still present in the game's code and could be accessed using a modification or cheating device, Grand Theft Auto: San Andreas was re-rated Adults Only and recalled by Rockstar Games, in favor of a new revision of the game that omitted the offending content entirely and carried the original Mature rating.

On 18 January 2025, Marvel Snap was pulled from the App Store and Google Play Store as a result of the Protecting Americans from Foreign Adversary Controlled Applications Act (PAFACA) being signed into law, with the app also preventing players from logging back in. This was due to security concerns being raised over the game's publisher, known as Nuverse, whose parent company, ByteDance, was accused of collecting sensitive data, alongside their other applications (most notably the social media platform TikTok) and potentially sharing such information with the government of China, the company's origin of operation, which is recognized as a foreign adversary of the United States of America.

== Ukraine ==
Mortal Kombat 11 is banned in Ukraine due to high-impact blood and gore and depictions of communist symbolism, which is banned per Ukrainian law.

Negligee: Love Stories is not officially banned in Ukraine, but Dharker Studios decided to not release this game on Steam due to explicit sexual content and nudity. The game was also not released in many other countries for the same reason, including Afghanistan, Algeria, Bangladesh, Belarus, Botswana, China, Egypt, Ethiopia, Guyana, Iceland, Indonesia, Iran, Iraq, Lebanon, Malaysia, Morocco, Myanmar, Namibia, Nigeria, Pakistan, Papua New Guinea, Russia, Saudi Arabia, South Africa, South Korea, Sudan, Syria, Turkey, Turkmenistan, Uganda, the United Arab Emirates, the United Kingdom, Venezuela and Vietnam.

== Uzbekistan ==
Authorities in Uzbekistan banned a number of games over concerns that they could be "used to propagate violence, pornography, threaten security and social and political stability", most notably first-person shooters such as Call of Duty: Black Ops and Doom, horror games like Silent Hill and Resident Evil, Mortal Kombat and even relatively non-violent simulations such as The Sims and Avatar World. The ban was condemned and ridiculed for taking precedence over more important societal issues and a waste of time and effort.

== See also ==
- Video game controversies
- List of regionally censored video games
- List of recalled video games
- List of banned films
- List of books banned by governments
- List of controversial video games
- Television censorship
