= Sky Shadow =

1990 video game

- Developer: Patrick Buckland
- Publishers: MacSoft; Casady & Greene
- Platform: Macintosh
- Release: 1990: MacSoft; 1994: Casady & Greene
- Genre: Scrolling shooter

Sky Shadow is a clone of the 1981 Defender arcade video game published by MacSoft for the Macintosh in 1990. It was programmed by Patrick Buckland who also wrote Crystal Quest. Casady & Greene re-released the game in 1994.

== Reception ==
Sky Shadow was critically acclaimed when originally released, featuring detailed graphics and fast-paced gameplay. It received the top score of five mice from MacUser magazine and was inducted into the Macworld magazine "Game Hall of Fame" as the Best Shoot-'em-up game of 1990.

Macworld praised Sky Shadow's graphics and sound effects as well as its gameplay, stating that "Sky Shadow is an engaging, fun, and highly addictive game". Macworld criticized its stability, stating it "often crashes", as well as its "severe penalties for minor mistakes" in that it's easy to die, whereupon the player loses all their points.
