= Magic: The Gathering – Duels of the Planeswalkers 2013 =

2012 virtual card game

Magic: The Gathering - Duels of the Planeswalkers 2013
- Developer: Stainless Games
- Publisher: Wizards of the Coast
- Director: Ben Gunstone
- Designers: Miles Boylan; Steve Earl; Andy Sandham; Shaun Smith
- Platforms: Microsoft Windows, PlayStation 3, Xbox 360, iOS
- Release: June 20, 2012
- Genre: Collectible card game
- Modes: Single player, Multiplayer

Magic: The Gathering – Duels of the Planeswalkers 2013 (referred to in shorthand as DotP 2013 or Magic 2013) is a video game based on the popular collectible card game of the same name, first published by Wizards of the Coast in 1993. The game was released on June 20, 2012, via Steam, Xbox Live Arcade, the PlayStation Network, and iPad, and is the third game in the Magic: The Gathering – Duels of the Planeswalkers series. The gameplay follows that of the original card game, however within a more restrained framework. It received mainly positive reviews and was number one in the PlayStation Network sales for June. The sequel, Magic: The Gathering – Duels of the Planeswalkers 2014, was released in 2013.

== Gameplay ==
A gameplay screenshot showing the new "Planechase" mode

The core game follows the standard rules of the collectible card game Magic: The Gathering, first released in 1993; each player has a deck of cards consisting of lands and spells. Lands are used to generate "mana", the resource needed to cast spells. Mana comes in five colors, and cards may require colored or generic (mana of any color) to be cast. Spells come in many varieties, from sorceries and instants which have one-time effects, to summoned creatures which can attack and defend from opponents. Players alternate turns playing land cards, casting spells, and attacking opponents until all but one player's life total is reduced to 0.

There are four campaigns; an initial campaign, a "revenge" campaign, a challenge campaign, and a campaign featuring the new "planechase" mode. The "standard" campaign consists of ten player matches; defeating each opponent unlocking their respective deck; and eight "encounters", which are matches against an AI who plays specific cards in a specific order each turn, to test individual aspects of your deck. The "revenge" campaign consists of eleven matches which are a more difficult version of each of the main-campaign planeswalkers. The "challenge" campaign is ten challenges long - these are set scenarios which can generally be won within a turn and the player must figure out how to use the cards at their disposal to ascertain this method. The "planechase" campaign consists of four games against groups of three opponents. A new plane card deck is situated in the middle of play and each turn a player may roll a die to either activate the planes effect or change it to another; the effects of these planes are generally quite dramatic.

For the first time the game includes the option for the player to manually choose which mana to tap (for use in multicolour decks).

== Development and Marketing ==
The game features in-game adverts relating to the release of the real-life cards and the "planeswalker" cards, which are not available for use in the video game. It also allows "veteran" Magic the Gathering players to play with the new cards before they are actually released. Additionally, a code is supplied with each purchase of the video game allowing buyers to redeem it for one of three, depending upon platform, 6-card booster packs in retail stores. The packs will feature one card with an alternate design which will be specific to the platform on which the video game was purchased and five other (non-unique) cards.

== Reception and sales ==
Reception

Aggregate scores
| Aggregator | Score |
|---|---|
| GameRankings | 81.89% |
| Metacritic | 80 |

Review scores
| Publication | Score |
|---|---|
| Eurogamer | 9/10 |
| Game Informer | 7/10 |
| IGN | 8.5/10 |
| Joystiq | 4.5/5 |
| Official Xbox Magazine (US) | Favourable |
| The Escapist | 4/5 |
| Forbes | 8/10 |
| Pocket Gamer | Favourable |

The game received mostly positive reviews, with critics praising the quality of the Magic the Gathering video gaming franchise in general and criticising the similarity to the previous incarnation of the game.

Leif Johnson, for IGN, found the game to be "easily Stainless Games' best effort at providing an accessible yet challenging version of Magic to date", finding the campaign to be "decently sized" and planechase to be "fun when it works". Johnson did state, concerning this latter, that "when it doesn't work, it's a snoozefest" and found it "regrettable that we still can't design our own decks in an advanced mode of some sort". Overall, Johnson awarded the game a score of 8.5 out of 10 specifically praising the gameplay and lasting appeal. Rich Stanton, for Eurogamer, found the game to be more enjoyable than the original card game even, stating "the automation of Magic's mundane aspects in Duels is worth the trade-off of losing physical cards", finding it "so much easier and more enjoyable, for me at least, to have the computer do all the number-crunching and shuffling". Stanton also commented on the inclusion of the iPad release, a first for a Magic The Gathering game, stating "card games in general work beautifully on tablets, and the intuitive controls and polished visuals see Magic get it right first time", concluding "Magic: The Gathering is an amazing game, easily one of the best I've played in any medium. Duels of the Planeswalkers 2013 is its best video game translation yet, a perfectly pitched blend of hard strategy and endless tinkering with unlocks that just keep on coming."

Joshua Vanderwall, for The Escapist, found that despite the fact that Duels 2013 offers "nothing particularly different from the earlier versions of the franchise" and stating that the "lack of diversity in the deck options seems like a bit of a step backwards in an otherwise static continuation of the series" he still found it to be "entirely enjoyable"; stating in conclusion that "If you're new to the Duels series, and have even a passing interest in Magic, this game is definitely for you. If you've played the first two Duels exhaustively, however, this version feels a bit lacking." David M. Ewalt, for Forbes magazine found the gameplay "better", with "much-needed tweaks like manual mana tapping"; the campaign "fun and fast" and the online play "challenging and addictive". Reviewing for Official Xbox Magazine, Taylor Cocke praised the way the game introduces the Magic: The Gathering gameplay to new players, stating that "Short of being taught in-person by an experienced player, Duels' in-depth tutorial is one of the best ways to learn the game"; and conversely, to those experienced in Magic, that "the puzzle-like challenges are a great way for seasoned players to test their mettle." Of the new "planechase" mode, Cocke found it to be "chaotic and fun" and that "it offers snappy, efficient games with little lag"; stating, in conclusion "whatever your skill level, Duels 2013 is an excellent way to play Magic."

Adam Biessener, for Game Informer found this installment to be "a step back" in terms of quality. Biessener stated that while Magic: The Gathering "is such a strong, deep game" such that he would play any incarnation, he found that "boring monochrome decks and a worse-than-ever one-off mode make this the weakest edition of the series". Following this, Biessener stated that while he is "all for including some monochrome decks for beginners", "two- or three-color decks are generally richer and more interesting to play" and the current offerings "pale in comparison to the exotic setups from years past". Of the "execrable" planechase game mode, Biessener found that the "hundreds of extra events" "make it truly awful", following that "Planechase is worse than last year's Archenemy mode, which I thought was as bad as things could get." In conclusion, he found that "despite all of these complaints, the core game is strong. Everything works as expected, the cards are translated perfectly, and the AI can play at the level of an average human" although did state that, for a beginner, "I'd recommend playing either of the previous two games before this one, though."

The game was ranked first in the PlayStation Network sales chart for June 2012.
