= Film censorship =

Films that are banned in a particular country

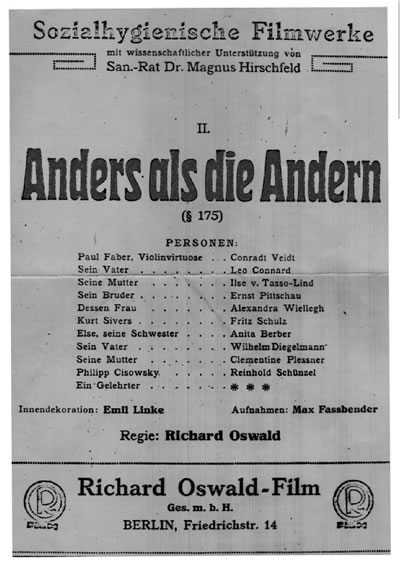
Anders als die Andern, one of the most notable banned movies in Germany due to homosexual themes

Film censorship is the censorship of motion pictures, either through the excising of certain frames or scenes, or outright banning of films in their entirety. Film censorship typically occurs as a result of political or moral objections to a film's content; controversial content subject to censorship include the depiction of graphic violence, sexual situations, or racial themes. Censorship standards vary widely by country, and can vary within an individual country over time.

== Rating systems ==
A motion picture rating system is designated to classify films with regard to suitability for audiences in terms of issues such as sex, violence, substance abuse, profanity, impudence or other types of obscene content. A particular issued rating can be called a certification, classification, certificate.

== By country ==
=== Australia ===
Australia's Australian Classification Board (ACB), formerly known as the Office of Film and Literature Classification (OFLC), uses the Commonwealth Classification Act 1995 as a guide for the majority of the censorship within the country; however, each state and territory is free to make additional legislation (see Censorship in Australia). Australia is regarded by many to be the most restrictive on film ratings of all Western democratic countries, considering its history and prolific "refusal of classification" (tantamount to banning in other countries) to certain films, although restrictions have eased over the years.

In practice, films still get a short cinematic run before they are reviewed and prevented from being shown at cinemas or released on DVD. This is not a comprehensive list; many films that have been previously banned are not mentioned here (however, some have since been released uncut on DVD). Also not included are the numerous pornographic films deemed too excessive to release under an X18+ category, which are refused classification by the ACB.

=== Belgium and the Belgian Congo ===
Although the Belgian Constitution of 1831 prohibited censorship and it was often claimed that there was no censorship of adult films in Belgium, archival research shows that the editing of films was a widespread practice for more than 70 years. In September 1920, Belgium passed the “Wet Vandervelde” (named after Minister of Justice Emile Vandervelde), which prohibited children under the age of 16 from attending screenings unless a film had been rated “cildren approved” (CA) by the Belgian Film Classification Board (BeBFC; Filmkeuringscommissie / Commission de Contrôle des Films). Although submission was legally voluntary, distributors could bypass the board and release films with an “16 and up” rating, commercial reliance on family audiences led the film industry to submit most films for classification, comply with demanded cuts, and even perform pre-emptive cuts (coupures préalables) before review.

Between 1922 and 2003, the BeBFC classified 45,365 films (excluding a wartime hiatus after German occupiers abolished the board in April 1941 until it resumed in September 1944, briefly operating alongside a military censorship board). Overall, 56.4% of classified titles were approved uncut, 25.8% were refused for children, and 17.6% were approved only after cuts, with the board acting significantly more strictly in the pre-war period (1922–1939) than after World War II. Between 1922 and 1992, the board mandated cuts in 9,727 films, primarily targeting violence (41.6%), sex and eroticism (22.1%), crime (17.5%), and unfavourable portrayals of marriage and family (8.0%), affecting major releases such as Modern Times (1936), Casablanca (1942), and La Strada (1954). Cuttings declined sharply after 1970, and the board requested its final cut in August 1992.

In contrast to the voluntary system in metropolitan Belgium, the colonial authorities in the Belgian Congo implemented a mandatory censorship system from 1917 until independence in 1960. Following an initial decree from 1917 aimed at protecting “public order,” a decree from May 1936 adapted the Belgian Child Protection Act of 1920 to the colony by replacing the term “children” with “natives” (indigènes), under which Congolese viewers required a special permit, while Europeans and Asians were allowed to attend unauthorized film screenings. Later regulations from 1954–1955 granted limited exemptions to the “immatriculés” (officially recognized “évolués”). From 1956 prominent évolués, such as future president Joseph Kasavubu, were appointed to the censorship commission. Even so, most Congolese remained excluded from regular screenings, though many bypassed controls through clandestine screenings. Especially Westerns were admired by urban youth gangs in Léopoldville (the “Bills”), whose subculture of resistance helped fuel the January Léopoldville riots in 1959.

=== Brazil ===
During dictatorship (1964–1988)

During the dictatorship in Brazil, that last from 1964 to 1988, several films were banned under the Federal Law from Brazil 5536 from 1968. During several years a project was being developed to find and publish every document on censorship in films during the dictatorship. The project "Memory of Censorship in Brazilian Cinema" released in 2005 six thousand documents about 175 banned films during the dictatorship. And, finally, in 2007 they released documents for the last 269 films banned at that time.

After democratization (1988–)

- 1993: Beyond Citizen Kane:

"On August 20, 2009, the newspaper Folha de S. Paulo reported that Rede Record bought the broadcasting rights of the documentary from Ellis for less than US$ 20,000."

"On February 14, 2011, the newspaper Jornal do Brasil (quoting the network's spokesperson) reported that Rede Record would be broadcasting the documentary in 2011, on a date yet to be specified."

- 1976: Di Cavalcanti:

This film (short) about Di Cavalcanti was banned due a lawsuit open by Di Cavalcanti daughter, Elizabeth, in 1979. The film documented the wake and funeral of the Brazilian painter Di Cavalcanti. Since 1979 it can not be shown, at the request of his daughter Elizabeth through preliminary injunction granted by Justice, confirmed in 1983, for sentimental reasons tied with religious ideas. In 1985, the lawyer Felipe Falcon moved an action to reform the judgment, by proposing the dispossession of the film by the state on cultural grounds, to the detriment of the heirs of Di and Glauber. Yet with no solution in sight, Di Glauber must stay contained in a sealed box. 2004: In spite of everything, João Rocha ( director of Thuth Profane), nephew of the Glauber Rocha, has placed a copy on video on providers outside of Brazil: the internet users can make free downloads of the movie, proving that censor the cinema in digital age is useless.

- 2011: A Serbian Film:

A Serbian Film had its release in Brazil liberated on August 5, 2011. The exception is Rio de Janeiro estate, where the film was forbidden due a lawsuit filed by the Democrats political party, who claim that the pedophilia scenes infringe the part of the Brazilian Constitution that protects children (Estatuto da Criança e do Adolescente). The case was overturned in 2012.

=== Canada ===
At present, only films containing prohibited material (such as child pornography) or under court order (such as libel or copyright infringement) are banned in Canadian provinces.

=== Chile ===
In 1974, during General Augusto Pinochet's dictatorship (1973–1990), a film censorship decree allowed the banning of films. During the years when film censorship existed in Chile, 1,092 films were banned in the country. The Chilean film censorship system has not changed significantly until November 1996 when after United International Pictures requested that The Last Temptation of Christ be rated, the film was allowed for audiences over 18. However, an ultra-conservative religious group filed an injunction to reverse the decision and in June 1997 the Supreme Court banned the film. In September 1997 a civil liberties group took the case to the Inter-American Commission on Human Rights. In February 2001 the Inter-American Court of Human Rights ruled that Chile was in violation of the American Convention on Human Rights and that it should lift the ban on the film and modify its legislation to comply with the convention. In August 2001 a constitutional reform eliminated film censorship and the film appeared on video stores. In January 2003 a new film rating law was published and the film was given an "over 18" rating. The film premiered on 13 March 2003 at a theater in Santiago.

=== China ===
In Mainland China, film censorship, often on political grounds, is rampant. Films in Mainland China are used to be reviewed by the State Administration of Press, Publication, Radio, Film and Television (SAPPRFT) (Chinese: 国家新闻出版广电总局) which dictated whether, when, and how a movie gets released. In 2018, the SAPPRFT was replaced by the National Film Administration (NFA) under the Publicity Department (Chinese: 国家电影局). The NFA is separate from the NRTA under the State Council (Chinese: 广电总局).

=== Germany ===
Main article: Censorship in the Federal Republic of Germany

==== Pre war and during the First World War ====
In 1906, the first legislation arose discussing the censorship of film and media. This was met with pushback, due to preexisting legislation regarding censorship of the media. The higher courts deemed the film censorship was indeed legal, however provided no guidance towards individual parts of Germany, creating discrepancies province to province.

==== Post WW1 ====
In Germany, film censorship was abolished in 1918, however the Motion Picture Law (Lichtspielgesetz) in 1920 created film review boards which were used to screen films that may perpetrate a negative image of Germany to the rest of the world.

=== India ===
In India, films are censored by the Central Board of Film Certification (CBFC), a statutory censorship and classification body under the Ministry of Information and Broadcasting, Government of India. Films should be certified by the board to publicly exhibit it in India, including films shown in television. CBFC is considered to be one of the most powerful censor boards in the world due to its strict ways of functioning.

=== Iran ===
All films depicting anything deemed contrary to Islamic morals are banned outright in Iran.

=== Ireland ===
Due to the small size of Ireland, films banned by the British Board of Film Classification (BBFC) were rarely even submitted for release in Ireland, due to the high costs of promotion and distribution for such a small audience. Similarly, BBFC cuts are often left in DVD releases, due to the difficulties in separating the two film supplies.

This changed in 2000; many of these films have since been unbanned and rated anywhere from PG to 18. During the review process it was decided that no more films would be banned for either theatre or video release, but some bans are still in place. Banned films can still be viewed at private members' clubs with 18+ age limits.

=== Israel ===
All German films were banned from 1956 until 1967.

=== Japan ===
See Cinema of Japan and Censorship in Japan

=== Kuwait ===
In Kuwait, the Ministry of Information is responsible for censoring movies. The ministry can cut scenes they consider inappropriate. Any film connected to politics, sexuality, religion or extreme violence can be censored.

=== Pakistan ===
After the promulgation of 18th Constitutional amendment by the constituent Assembly of Pakistan, Sindh and Punjab Province has established their own film censor boards namely Punjab Board of Film Censors and Sindh Board of Film Censors, Mr khalid bin Shaheen is the current Chairman SBFC and Mr. Adil Ahmed is the Secretary Sindh board of film censors.

=== South Africa ===
During the Apartheid regime, films depicting interracial couples were banned and/or censored for content - the James Bond films Live and Let Die and A View To A Kill had love scenes which were censored by the South African government.

In 1996 The Film and Publication Board, or FPB, was established under the Film and Publications Act. This board was created as a content-classification and regulation authority, operating under the Minister of Communications. The FPB's purpose was ostensibly to tackle issues of child pornography and child abuse, as well as to provide ratings to publicly consumed media such as movies, music and television programs. Under these directives, its mandate could be considered one of state censorship.

=== South Korea ===
According to the Internet Movie Database, there are no currently-banned films in South Korea.

In recent years, sexual scenes have been a major issue that pits filmmakers against the Korea Media Rating Board (KMRB). Pubic hair and male or female genitalia are disallowed on the screen, unless they are digitally blurred. In rare cases extreme violence, obscene language, or certain portrayals of drug use may also be an issue. The KMRB has five different content ratings; ALL, 12, 15, 19 (since 2024), and Restricted.

=== United Kingdom ===
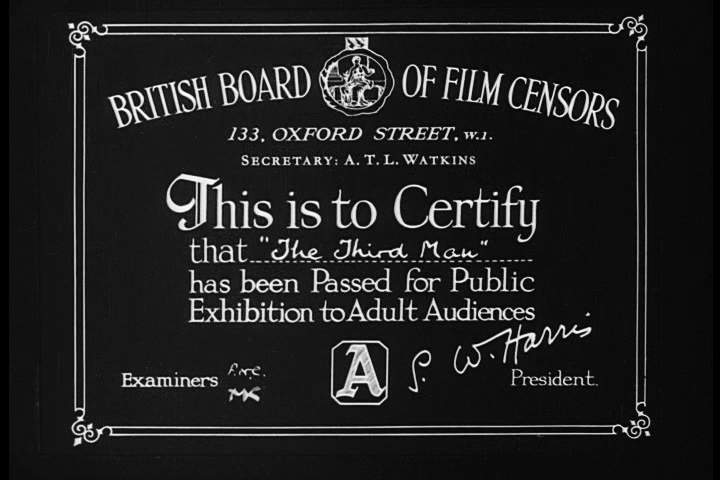
BBFC established in 1912

The infamous video nasty list was created in 1982 to protect against obscenity. Films on this list were banned and distributors of said films were liable to be prosecuted (some of the films were banned before the list was made). This list banned 74 films at one point in the mid-1980s; the list was eventually trimmed down, and only 39 films were successfully prosecuted. Most of the films (even of the 39 successfully prosecuted) have now been approved by the BBFC, cut or uncut (see Video Recordings Act 1984).

=== United States ===
The United States has no federal agency charged with either permitting or restricting the exhibition of motion pictures. Most instances of films being banned are via ordinances or proclamations by city or state governments. Some are instances of films being judicially found to be of an obscene nature and subject to specific laws against such material (i.e., child pornography). Such findings are usually only legally binding in the jurisdiction of the court making such a ruling.

Logo for the Motion Picture Association

The established film industry in the United States began a form of self-censorship in the late 1920s called the Motion Picture Production Code to forestall any possible formation of a federal censoring agency. In 1968, the Production Code was superseded by the MPAA film rating system. The rating system is broken down into five categories and each have a respective definition. They are G (General Audiences; All ages admitted), PG (Parental Guidance Suggested; Some material may not be suitable for children), PG-13 (Parents Strongly Cautioned; Some material may be inappropriate for children under 13), R (Restricted; Under 17 requires accompanying parent or adult guardian), and NC-17 (No one under 17 admitted). It was created by Jack Valenti in 1968. In addition to providing film ratings, the MPAA also lobbies Congress, helps in international promotion of the U.S. film industry, and piracy protection.

== Brief history ==
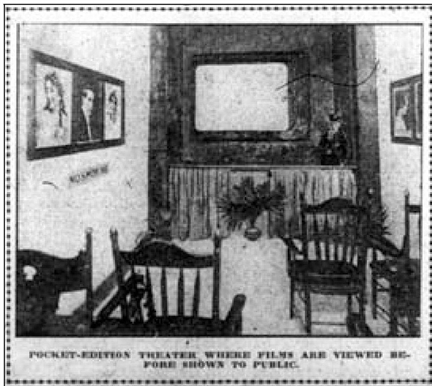
Private Screening Room

Film censorship, the control of the content and presentation of a film, has been a part of the film industry almost as long as it has been around. The activists of current society continue to broaden the First Amendment rights for the film industry allowing the art to be restricted to a certain limit. In fact, Britain established film censorship in 1912 and the United States followed a decade later. Other early efforts of censoring the film industry include the Hays Code of 1922 and the Motion Picture Production Code of 1930.

== See also ==
- Deleted scene
- Re-edited film
- Filming permit
- List of banned video games
- Self-censorship
- Television censorship
