= Step on It =

Step on It may refer to:

- Step on It (EP), a 1994 EP by Teddybears
- Step on It! (video game), a 1996 Apple Macintosh game
- Step on It! (film), a 1922 silent American film
- Step on It (film), a 1936 American film
