= Magic: The Gathering – Duels of the Planeswalkers 2014 =

2013 virtual card game

Magic 2014 - Duels of the Planeswalkers
- Developer(s): Stainless Games
- Publisher(s): Wizards of the Coast
- Director(s): Ben Gunstone
- Designer(s): Robert Shaer; Miles Boylan; Steve Earl
- Platform(s): Microsoft Windows, PlayStation 3, Xbox 360, iOS, Android
- Release: June 26, 2013
- Genre(s): Collectible card game
- Mode(s): Single player, Multiplayer

Magic 2014 – Duels of the Planeswalkers (referred to in shorthand as DotP 2014 or Magic 2014) is a video game based on the popular collectible card game of the same name, first published by Wizards of the Coast in 1993. The game was released on 26 June 2013 on PC (Steam), Xbox 360 (Xbox Live Arcade), PlayStation 3 (PlayStation Network), iPad (iTunes), and Android devices (Google Play and the Amazon Appstore). It is the fourth game in the Magic: The Gathering – Duels of the Planeswalkers series. The gameplay follows that of the original card game, however within a more restrained framework. It includes a new feature, "Sealed Play", which allows players to open virtual booster packs and build their own decks. These decks can be used in the special Sealed campaign, and also in multiplayer. The game, like all the previous installments, is priced $10.00 on all platforms. Additional slots for custom made decks can be purchased separately for $1.99. The sequel, Magic: The Gathering – Duels of the Planeswalkers 2015, was released in 2014.

== Reviews ==
Duels of the Planeswalkers 2014 received largely positive reviews, scoring 83% on aggregated review site Metacritic.

The Digital Fix gave the game 9/10 with Rob Kershaw praising the tutorial and new Sealed Play mode, as well as the replay value.

The Game Scouts praised the game by saying "If you've retired slinging spells for a while and want to pop back in to see what Magic has become, DotP 2014 will convince you why you fell in love with the game to begin with."
