= Doomsday 2000 =

Doomsday 2000 may refer to:

- The Year 2000 problem
- Doomsday 2000 (video game), a roguelike game
