= Casady & Greene =

US software publisher and developer

- Industry: Computer software
- Predecessor: Casady Co, CasadyWare, Greene, Inc.
- Founded: 1988
- Defunct: 2003
- Headquarters: United States

Casady & Greene (sometimes abbreviated to C&G) was a software publisher and developer active from 1988 to 2003. The company primarily released software for Macintosh, but also released software for Windows and Newton. Casady & Greene was formed in 1988 when Greene, Inc. acquired CasadyWare, a company owned by Robin Casady.

== History ==
Robin Casady founded Casady Company in 1984. Initially, it was a Macintosh bitmap font publisher. The fonts were jointly developed by Robin Casady and Richard Ware. Casady Co first advertised in the January 1985 issue of Macworld magazine.

To defray Macworld exhibition costs, Casady Co shared exhibition floor space with Greene Johnson, Inc. which sold Spellswell, a stand-alone spelling checker for the Macintosh. Along with exhibition floor space, Casady Co shared the company's credit card merchant account so that Greene Johnson could sell their software. Otherwise, the two companies were separate entities.

In 1986, Casady Co expanded into publishing Postscript fonts and, acknowledging Richard Ware's key contributions, the company was renamed CasadyWare.

Greene Johnson dissolved in 1987 when Michael Greene left to found Greene, Inc.. Robin Casady persuaded Greene to write QuickDEX, a Desk Accessory version of a card catalog program written by Bill Atkinson. QuickDEX was Greene, Inc.'s first product. As a Desk Accessory, QuickDex could run while simultaneously using another program on the Macintosh. At the time, the Macintosh operating system did not support multiple programs running concurrently.

In the Spring of 1987, Greene downloaded a shareware game Crystal Raider sold by Patrick Buckland. Greene sent his shareware fee with a note telling Buckland to contact Greene if he ever wanted to have any of his games published. A couple of months later, Buckland sent Greene an expanded version of his shareware game to evaluate. Coincidentally, Apple Computer gave Greene a preview of the Macintosh II before it was released. A consequence of the preview was that Apple lent Greene, Inc. a pre-release Mac II. Buckland used the new Mac to add color to his black and white game. At the time, Buckland joked he hated the new computer because it compiled his software so quickly that he didn't have time to brew his tea.

Greene, Inc. published Buckland's game Crystal Quest at the same time the Mac II became available. As the game was the first color game for the Mac II, it sold along with virtually every Mac II. Several months after the Mac II's introduction, the editorial staff at MacUser spent way too much time playing the game. When time came to publish the month's edition, they ended up devoting 8 pages of a very thin edition to Crystal Quest. The combination of the free advertising and unique position in the game market resulted in Greene, Inc. having a very profitable year.

In 1988, Casady put CasadyWare up for sale, as the fonts weren't selling well enough to sustain the company. Greene, Inc. needed continued access to CasadyWare's credit card merchant account. The Central California banks had recently been burdened by a large, unrelated software company's bankruptcy and weren't willing to open new credit card merchant accounts for any other software company. Greene, Inc. purchased CasadyWare, retaining access to the merchant account. Greene, Inc.'s officers didn't want the merchant bank to realize they were dealing with a new software company, so the officers dissolved Greene, Inc. and kept CasadyWare, Inc. as the surviving corporation which was renamed Casady & Greene, Inc.

Other software to follow were a Crystal Quest game editor, Critter Editor, the security suite AME, crash recovery utility Crash Barrier, InfoGenie, iData, Let's Keep It Simple Spreadsheet (Let's KISS), Spreadsheet 2000, InstaFiles! and various games: Sky Shadow, Mission Starlight, Glider, Aqua Blooper Piper, Pararena, Mission Thunderbolt, Spaceway 2000, Silicon Casino, Glider PRO, AmoebArena, Step On It!, Zone Warrior I and II, and Crystal Crazy. Between 1987 and 1990, games were the primary revenue source. In total, six Casady & Greene games were inducted into the Macworld Game Hall of Fame: Crystal Quest, Crystal Crazy, Mission: Thunderbolt, Glider, Sky Shadow,and Step On It!

In late 1990, C&G consolidated the entire Postscript Font offering into a single package and sold it on both the PC and Macintosh platforms, which sold very well.

C&G was the initial distributor of SoundJam MP, a program which was the basis for Apple Inc's iTunes. They also distributed Conflict Catcher and Spell Catcher, popular tools for the classic Mac OS.

== Closure ==
By September 2002, Casady & Greene had downsized from 25 to 8 employees with the bursting of the dot-com bubble. Apple had carved into Casady & Greene's market share by releasing software that duplicated its releases: Apple included a native program similar to Conflict Catcher in the classic Mac OS, and the OS X Address Book overlapped with iData. Unlike other Macintosh software companies such as Pangea Software and Ambrosia Software, Casady & Greene was unable to successfully transition from the classic Mac OS to the Unix-based Mac OS X, and the company closed its doors on July 3, 2003. Some of C&G's titles were remade for OS X, and a fraction of these have been remade to run on Intel-based Macs. Only a few of their titles were ever released on Windows.
