= Magic: The Gathering – Duels of the Planeswalkers 2012 =

2011 virtual card game

Magic: The Gathering - Duels of the Planeswalkers 2012
- Developer: Stainless Games
- Publisher: Wizards of the Coast
- Directors: Darren Barnett; Ben Gunstone
- Designers: Patrick Buckland; Alan Kemp; Will McCourt; Andrew Sandham; Shaun Smith
- Platforms: Xbox 360, PlayStation 3, Microsoft Windows
- Release: June 15, 2011
- Genre: Collectible card game
- Modes: Single-player, multiplayer

Magic: The Gathering – Duels of the Planeswalkers 2012 (referred to in shorthand as DotP 2012 or Magic 2012) is a video game based on the popular collectible card game of the same name, published by Wizards of the Coast. It was released on June 15, 2011. The game is a follow-up to the highly popular Magic: The Gathering – Duels of the Planeswalkers, which was released in 2009. An expansion for the game, called Ascend into Darkness, was released on September 14, 2011. The sequel, Magic: The Gathering – Duels of the Planeswalkers 2013, was released in 2012.

== Gameplay ==
The new Archenemy mode pits three players (bottom) with normal health against one player (top) with extra health and additional abilities. The Archenemy is currently in their combat phase, attacking one of their three opponents using four creatures. The targeted player is blocking two of those attacks with two of their own creatures.

The core game follows the standard rules of the collectible card game Magic: The Gathering; each player has a deck of cards consisting of lands and spells. Lands are used to generate "mana", the resource needed to cast spells. Mana comes in five colors, and cards may require colored or generic (mana of any color) to be cast. Spells come in many varieties, from sorceries and instants which have one-time effects, to summoned creatures which can attack and defend from opponents. Players alternate turns playing land cards, casting spells, and attacking opponents with creatures until all but one player's life total is reduced from 20 to 0.

There are three campaigns; an initial campaign, a challenge campaign, and a campaign featuring the new Archenemy mode. Each of the three campaigns has eleven missions. In addition, puzzles, scenarios where the player takes control of one side of a match that has already been mostly played and has to achieve victory in only one turn, make a reappearance in the sequel. Unlike in the first game, where puzzles were a standalone mode, puzzles in Duels 2012 are integrated into the campaign as unlockable side missions.

Multiplayer also makes a return to Duels 2012.

=== Downloadable content ===
The game's expansion, titled "Ascend into Darkness" was released on September 14, 2011. The expansion featured three new decks, allowed players to play as the Archenemy, and added an Archenemy mode single player campaign and Archenemy challenge content. Three deck packs, each consisting of two new decks, were released on November 16, 2011, December 14, 2011, and January 11, 2012. These brought the total number of decks up to nineteen.

== Reception ==
Reception

Aggregate scores
Aggregator	Score
GameRankings	74.5%
Metacritic	77/100

Review scores
Publication	Score
Game Informer	8.0
GamePro	4.5/5
GameSpot	6.5
Official Xbox Magazine (US)	8.5

The first game in the series, Magic: The Gathering – Duels of the Planeswalkers sold over half a million units, creating high expectations for Duels 2012. Initial reception for the game was mostly positive. Game Informer praised the interface and noted that unpopular features from the 2009 game (such as the inability to remove unwanted cards from decks) have been fixed for the 2012 game, but criticized the new Archenemy mode and noted that there were some balance issues in the game. GamePro praised the art and the improved interface of the 2012 edition, but felt that the campaign was shallow.
