= QuickDex =

QuickDex is a free-form database application and personal information manager first released by Casady & Greene for Classic Mac OS. The application stores textual data that doesn't fit into more rigid database structures. It uses a Rolodex metaphor to present information as a stack of "cards" akin to HyperCard (sans hypertext). QuickDEX and its successors featured an extremely fast search, phone dialing, as well as label and envelope printing. It was originally released in 1987. An extensive update, QuickDEX II, was released in 1991. In late 1994, the product was rebranded InfoGenie and expanded to include a well-structured database with user-defined fields existing alongside the free-form database of its predecessors. Finally, in 2002, the software was rebranded as iData Pro for its transition to Mac OS X; support for Classic Mac OS was retained for the initial versions of iData Pro.

Since the closing of Casady & Greene, Inc., iData has been taken over by Mike Wright and Robin Casady. The new version was rewritten in Cocoa exclusively for Mac OS X. It expands on its predecessors by adding (among many other features) the ability to have styled text, images, and sound files in the freeform text area.

There is also a version available for the iPhone, iPad, and iPod Touch through the App Store. It is called iData Mobile Plus.
