= Pararena =

1990 video game

- Developer: John Calhoun
- Platform: Classic Mac OS
- Release: 1990
- Genre: Action
- Mode: Single-player

Pararena is an action computer game for the Apple Macintosh computer originally written in 1990 by John Calhoun and released as shareware. Calhoun previously wrote the Macintosh game Glider.

In 1992, in association with Casady & Greene, Calhoun wrote version 2.0 of Pararena which had 16 color graphics and was then a commercial product.

== Gameplay ==
It is a mouse-controlled ball game where two players compete on hoverboards in a parabolic arena with two "goals" on the sides. The objective is to gain scores by getting the ball into the other player's goal and, on the other hand, to protect one's own goal. The ball can be held for a while by squatting on it (holding the mouse button down) and then thrown to the current direction. If a player is tossed out of the arena still holding the ball, the player is charged with a foul and will respawn in a few seconds. Similarly, if the player throws the ball out of the arena, the player is charged with a foul and the ball will respawn. Each time a player amasses five fouls, the opponent is awarded with a point.

The game is situated in space and the two competing teams are called "Earth" and "Taygete".

== Reception ==
Pararena was reviewed by Matthew Wilber who described the game as "one of the great hits that never was" praising "clean graphics, memorable characters" and "elegantly simple game play".

== Legacy ==
On 27 Jan 2016, the source code, graphics, and sound data for Pararena were released on GitHub with the source code being licensed under the MIT license.
