= AmoebArena =

- Developer: Jason Regier
- Publisher: Casady & Greene
- Platform: Macintosh
- Release: 1995
- Genre: Strategy video game
- Mode: Single-player

AmoebArena is a strategy computer game, written by Jason Regier and distributed by Casady & Greene for the Macintosh in 1995.

== Overview ==
Regier co-developed a four-player version of the strategy game Ataxx using Glider's source code, before developing AmoebArena while attending Harvey Mudd College. In the game, the player must defeat a human or computer opponent with amoebas in an arena. AmoebArena is based in the year 2309. In the registered version of the game tournaments and a scenario editor are available.

== Reception ==
Macworld rated the game 3 out of 5 stars, calling it "an engaging game that's easy to learn" and comparing it to "the game of Risk invented by a mad cellular biologist." The review criticised the lack of network play and the need to play from the CD. MacFormat gave the game an overall rating of 70%, praising its variety but calling it "a limited experience" due to its tedious humor and predictable enemy AI. For MacFormat, the game was hampered by a lack of network or modem play. Inside Mac Games rated the game 4 out of 5 joysticks and singled out its wide range of appeal and variety of scenarios. For Inside Mac Games, AmoebArena was "a game that requires the utilization of strategic concepts and the ability to think ahead."
