= Stainless =

Stainless may refer to:

- Cleanliness, or the quality of being clean
- Stainless steel, a corrosion-resistant metal alloy
- Stainless Games, a British video game developer
- Stainless Broadcasting Company, a TV broadcaster based in Michigan, US
- Stainless Banner, the second national flag of the Confederate States of America
