= Bumbler Bee-Luxe =

1997 video game

- Developer: Dadgum Games
- Publishers: Dadgum Games; StarPlay Productions
- Platform: Mac OS
- Release: August 25, 1997
- Genre: Multidirectional shooter
- Mode: Single-player

Bumbler Bee-Luxe is an insect-themed multidirectional shooter video game, developed and published by American studio Dadgum Games in 1997 for the Mac. In 1998, it was re-released in several game compilations from StarPlay Productions.

== Gameplay ==
Bumbler Bee-Luxe is a 2D shooter in which the player is a bee protecting its hive from invaders.

== Development & release ==
The game was developed and published by Dadgum Games, a company founded in 1996.

Bumbler Bee-Luxe was also released in two game compilations from StarPlay Productions: Extreme Mac 12-Pack (which also contains Marathon and Glider Pro) and Extreme Mac 6-Pack.

== Reception ==
Reception

Review scores
Publication	Score
All Game Guide	2.5/5
Next Generation	4/5

Next Generation reviewed the game, rating it four stars out of five, and stated that "The only downside is that the background never seems to change [...] and sometimes, due to the color scheme, we lost track of enemies against the honey-combed background. Overall though, an excellent effort."

Paul Pettitt for MAClan Journal commented that "Bumbler Bee-Luxe is an almost pointless game of being a bee and getting flowers."

Josse Bilson for MacFormat gave the game a rating of 75% and said that "Odd as it may sound, no, despite first impressions being stacked against it, this is not a terrible game. You are a bee, locked in your hive, the last line of defence against a relentless insect onslaught. ... Dadgum has employed clever thinking and efficient programming to squeeze lots of graphics, sound and gameplay into just over 1Mb of space (with advanced compression and real-time decompression to reduce the actual size of the application), keeping as much of the data as possible in your Mac's cache. Forget any worries you have about the fact that Bumbler comes on a floppy disk - instead, be thankful that the overheads of a CD are not passed on to you, and you need only a laughable amount of RAM. ... Like Asteroids, the simplest ideas can make the most endearing and addictive - games, and Bumbler Bee-Luxe is a fine, budget-priced example of this. There are no multi-player or network modes and you get exactly what you see, only it moves at a cracking pace. Try the demo - you might get bitten but you definitely won't get stung."

Peter Cohen for Macworld in 2003 called it an "excellent game".
