= Magic Duels =

2015 video game

- Developer: Stainless Games
- Publisher: Wizards of the Coast
- Platforms: Microsoft Windows, Xbox One, iOS
- Release: July 29, 2015
- Genre: Collectible card game
- Modes: Single player, Multiplayer

Magic Duels (originally titled Magic Duels: Origins) is a video game based on the popular collectible card game Magic: The Gathering. Magic Duels is a successor to Stainless Games' Magic: The Gathering – Duels of the Planeswalkers and its annual sequels, released from 2009 through 2014. The free-to-play title was released on July 29, 2015, shortly following the physical release of the Magic Origins core set.

The gameplay follows that of the card game, but includes a story mode that follows the origin story of five of the game's Planeswalkers. This is the first game in Stainless' series to feature free-form deck construction and the ability to build a card library using both in-game rewards and microtransactions to purchase new cards and boosters. The game includes single player modes and online battles with other players.

Wizards of the Coast pulled the game from sale and discontinued in-game storefront features in November 2019, though the game remains playable.

== Gameplay ==
The core game follows the standard rules of the collectible card game (except that you can only use 1 mythic, 2 rares, and 3 uncommons of any card) Magic: The Gathering, first released in 1993; each player has a deck of cards consisting of lands and spells. Lands are used to generate "mana", the resource needed to cast spells. Mana comes in five colors, and cards may require colored or generic (mana of any color) to be cast. Spells come in many varieties, from sorceries and instants which have one-time effects, to summoned creatures which can attack and defend from opponents. Players alternate turns playing land cards, casting spells, and attacking opponents until all but one player's life total is reduced to 0.

Magic Duels: Origins frames the core game around a single-player story mode, and an online battle mode. In story mode, the player steps through the origin story of five different Planeswalkers, Chandra Nalaar, Jace Beleren, Gideon Jura, Nissa Revane, and Liliana Vess. Each Planeswalker has five or more duels with computer-controlled opponents. The player uses a deck based on the selected Planeswalker, and as they complete each of the duels, enhance that deck though the pre-selected addition of new cards. These decks, with whatever enhancements they have unlocked, are also available to the player in battle mode.

Battle mode lets players use pre-made decks or to construct decks from their collection of cards, and play against either computer opponents or online opponents; match types include one-on-one matches with players tracked on leaderboards, and Two-headed Giant (two-vs-two). Computer opponents in these modes can be selected from three difficulty levels, with higher difficulties gaining more rewards for the player. The computer opponents' decks will be procedurally generated, effectively randomizing the type of decks the player will face. Playing through either mode can earn the players in-game money to be used to buy new booster packs or specific cards to expand their card library; there are also various daily objectives for players to complete for in-game money, and all players are rewarded for helping to complete various community goals. Players can also purchase in-game money with microtransactions, but is not required to gain access to all cards and features.

== Card sets ==
The game was released primarily around the Magic Origins set of cards, the most recent release of the physical cards at the time of the game's introduction, with plans to expand the game to include upcoming card sets. The Battle for Zendikar, Oath of the Gatewatch, Shadows Over Innistrad, Eldritch Moon, Kaladesh, Aether Revolt, and Amonkhet sets are available in Magic Duels.

== Development ==
Magic Duels: Origins was developed by Stainless Games who have been creating computer versions of the Magic series since 2009's Magic: The Gathering – Duels of the Planeswalkers and new titles on an annual basis. These prior games did not include the ability to construct decks or build card libraries, instead primarily using designed decks that could be customized with predetermined additional cards earned through winning matches. Later games included sealed deck play where players would be given a number of booster packs and could build a deck from those cards, but those cards would only be available for that deck. With Magic Duel: Origins, the series now includes the ability for players to collect and buy cards and construct decks as they would normally in the physical version of Magic. Wizards of the Coast's Dan Barrett stated that with this change, the computer version now is much closer to the physical version, and hopes that this will help enable more players to experience Magic and transition to the physical game.

On November 26, 2019, Wizards of the Coast announced that it was ending support for Magic Duels, removing the game from digital storefront and disabling in-game purchases, though the game will remain playable with both single-player modes and multiplayer matchmaking.

== Reviews ==
It has a score of 78% on Metacritic.

Caitlin Cooke, from Destructoid mentioned, "Those new to Magic will find it easy to dive in and learn the intricacies of deck-building, while more experienced players should finally have the customization and card variety they’ve been asking for." Game Informer gave it a score of 8.75 out of 10.
