= Crystal Crazy =

1993 video game

- Crystal Crazy application icon
- Publisher: Casady & Greene
- Platform: Classic Mac OS
- Release: 1993
- Genre: Action game

Crystal Crazy is an action game, published by Casady & Greene for the Classic Mac OS in 1993. It is the sequel to Crystal Quest. The aim of the game is to collect crystals. Unlike Crystal Quest, which included a "Critter Editor," Crystal Crazy has no functionality for easily editing aspects of the game such as the enemy graphics.

Versions of Crystal Crazy before 1.05 do not have sound on PowerPC-based Macintoshes. The last version is 1.06. It is not possible to play this game on Intel-based Macs without an emulator.

== Gameplay ==
The player commands a spaceship piloted by a cow. When all in-game lives are expended, a cutscene depicts a cow in a spaceship, flying across the screen, towing a banner that says, "In space, no one can hear you moo."

The general objective of Crystal Crazy is to collect all the crystals on a given stage, and often to complete other quests, then escape through an opening at the bottom of the screen. At higher levels, the opening will change size at a fixed rate.

Quests include erasing or revealing paintings by navigating the spaceship over the canvas; knocking pool balls into the exit opening; breaking wine glasses and other fragile objects against the edge of the screen; or simply defeating all the enemies on a given level.

Bonuses, which add to the player's numeric score, are often scattered across the levels and can be collected.

Occasionally, a bonus round tasks the player with collecting as many items as possible, before escaping through the exit opening, while avoiding being crushed by two walls converging from either side of the screen. The player's performance during bonus rounds adds to their score.

Moving the mouse directs the spaceship in the appropriate direction. Clicking the mouse fires the spaceship's weapon. By default, the weapon releases one fixed-direction projectile per click. Power-ups enable the player to shoot multiple or homing projectiles, or add to the player's defensive capabilities, bestowing upon them various types of shields. Hitting enemies with projectiles weakens them, and enemy-launched projectiles can destroy the player's spaceship.

The player can use a limited number of bombs, denoted by a cherry bomb icon, to destroy all on-screen enemies. Advanced levels include mines that will destroy the player's spaceship upon contact.

As the player progresses, the enemies, portrayed as simple, pixelated sprites, become faster and develop the ability to shoot various projectiles. At higher stages, asteroids will float across the screen to impede the player, and can be destroyed piece-by-piece by shooting them with projectiles.

== Reception ==
Computer Gaming World in March 1994 stated that Crystal Crazy "shows how to do a sequel right" and "just as fun" as "its hallowed predecessor".
