= Novadrome =

2006 video game

- Developer: Stainless Games
- Publisher: Buena Vista Games
- Platform: Xbox 360
- Release: December 20, 2006
- Genre: Vehicle combat
- Modes: Single-player, multiplayer

Novadrome is a vehicular combat game created by Stainless Games, which was released on December 20, 2006 for Xbox 360, through Xbox Live Arcade. It pits players against each other in an arena style deathmatch. The game features three singleplayer modes (career, arcade, and free play) and a multiplayer mode for up to 8 players via Xbox Live. Novadrome features 24 different vehicles, 15 different multiplayer maps. The game was originally announced in 2004 for Xbox, PlayStation 2, PSP, GameCube and PC platforms. That versions were cancelled in December 2005.

== Reception ==
Reception

Review score
Publication	Score
Official Xbox Magazine (US)	7.0/10

The game fared poorly in the media, earning a GameRankings average of 52%.
