= Stainless Games =

British video game developer

- Type: Private
- Industry: Video games
- Founded: August 1994; 32 years ago
- Founder: Patrick Buckland; Neil Barnden
- Headquarters: Newport, Isle of Wight, United Kingdom
- Products: Carmageddon; Magic: The Gathering – Duels of the Planeswalkers; Risk: Factions
- Number of employees: 50
- Website: stainlessgames.com

Stainless Games is an independent British video game developer based in Newport, Isle of Wight, best known for the creation of the Carmageddon franchise.

== History ==
Originally named Stainless Software, the company was founded in 1993 and incorporated in August 1994 by lead programmer Patrick Buckland and design director Neil Barnden. It was originally located in "The Cottage" on the Isle of Wight.

Buckland was the lead programmer on Carmageddon and Carmageddon II: Carpocalypse Now and Barnden was the lead artist on both. Before Stainless Games, Buckland was a freelance programmer and Barnden was a senior designer at Conran and The Body Shop.

Starting with sub-contracted 3D engine work for Argonaut Games, and developing medical multimedia titles for the Times-Mirror Company, the company went on to develop what later became Carmageddon for SCi. This was launched amidst much controversy over its violent content in 1997 but received high review scores thanks to its compelling gameplay and many ground-breaking features (including a fully featured physics engine - a world-first for video games). Stainless released a sequel, Carmageddon II in 1998. Subsequent versions of the franchise (Carmageddon TDR 2000) were contracted by SCi to other developers and Stainless Games had no involvement.

In 2006, Stainless was sub-contracted by Blitz Games to develop one of its three Burger King games, PocketBike Racer. The company has subsequently developed in the console download field, with eleven titles released or soon to be released on XBLA, plus two titles on PSN (PS3). These include a range of Atari classic titles which have both the original version running under an emulator, and a completely re-written evolved version. These were also released on PSP as a single product in December 2007. Electronic Arts released the Stainless developed PSP and DS title Scrabble in early 2009. For licensing reasons, this was available for the North American market only.

The company released Magic: The Gathering – Duels of the Planeswalkers in June 2009 on XBLA. Developed over nearly two years in conjunction with Wizards of the Coast, the title broke sales records on Xbox Live Arcade (171,000 in the first month) and was well received by both critics and players. In April 2011, it was announced by Wizards of the Coast that Stainless Games was working on the new updated client version of Magic: The Gathering Online (commonly known as MTGO or MODO).

Stainless has also licensed Buckland's 1980s Mac classic Crystal Quest and has produced versions for XBLA and Windows Vista.

On 1 June 2011, Stainless announced that it had retrieved the rights to the Carmageddon brand, and that a new and completely independent game was in development, named Carmageddon: Reincarnation. On 8 May 2012, Stainless announced a Kickstarter project aimed at funding Carmageddon: Reincarnation into a new game, with an initial requirement of $400,000 which was successfully completed on 7 June 2012 at $625,143. Also in 2011 and 2012, ports of the first game in the franchise were released for the iOS and Android platforms. It was titled Carmageddon: Funsize and initially had a positive reception; however, the game eventually became free-to-play, and introduced ads along with bugs.

After releasing an updated version of Reincarnation titled Carmageddon: Max Damage and the smaller mobile game Carmageddon: Crashers, Stainless went on to sell the franchise IP to THQ Nordic. The company then started to focus on its new venture titled ShockRods, a car combat game with arena shooting elements.

== Games ==
- Carmageddon (1997)
- Carmageddon II: Carpocalypse Now (1998)
- Crystal Quest (2006)
- Novadrome (2006)
- Atari Classics Evolved (2007)
- Tempest (2007)
- Asteroids/Asteroids Deluxe (2007)
- Missile Command (2007)
- Centipede/Millipede (2007)
- Happy Tree Friends: False Alarm (2008)
- Red Baron (2008)
- Warlords (2008)
- Battlezone (2008)
- Magic: The Gathering – Duels of the Planeswalkers (2009)
- Scrabble (2009)
- Risk: Factions (2010)
- Carmageddon: Funsize (2012)
- Magic: The Gathering – Duels of the Planeswalkers 2012 (2011)
- Magic: The Gathering – Duels of the Planeswalkers 2013 (2012)
- Magic: The Gathering – Duels of the Planeswalkers 2014 (2013)
- Magic: The Gathering – Duels of the Planeswalkers 2015 (2014)
- Carmageddon: Reincarnation (2015)
- Magic Duels: Origins (2015)
- Carmageddon: Max Damage (2016)
- Carmageddon: Crashers (2017)
- ShockRods (2019)
