= Magic: The Gathering – Duels of the Planeswalkers 2015 =

2014 virtual card game

Magic 2015 - Duels of the Planeswalkers
- Developers: Stainless Games; Wizards of the Coast
- Publishers: Wizards of the Coast; Microsoft Studios (XBO, 360)
- Director: Stuart Bayliss
- Designers: James Kay; Robert Shaer; Miles Boylan; Steve Earl
- Platforms: Microsoft Windows, Xbox One, Xbox 360, iOS, Android
- Release: July 9, 2014 (iPad); July 16, 2014 (Xbox 360, Android, Steam); November 5, 2014 (Xbox One)
- Genre: Collectible card game
- Modes: Single Player, Multiplayer

Magic 2015 – Duels of the Planeswalkers (referred to in shorthand as Magic 2015) is a video game based on the collectible card game of the same name, first published by Wizards of the Coast in 1993. The game was released in July 2014 on PC (Steam), Xbox 360 (Xbox Live Arcade), iPad (iTunes), and Android devices (Google Play and the Amazon Appstore). An Xbox One version was released in November 2014. It is the fifth game in the Magic: The Gathering – Duels of the Planeswalkers series. The gameplay follows that of the original card game, however within a more restrained framework. The game, like all the previous installments, is priced $10 on most platforms. On the iPad, the game is free for the first realm (four battles) but has in-app purchases for the remaining realms, more cards and additional features.

== Gameplay ==
In Magic 2015, players are given the ability to create custom decks. As games are won and experience is earned, new cards of the player's choice are added to their collection. Players are also given the ability to open virtual booster packs to give more options when deck building, and the game gives assistance in creating decks.

=== Acquiring cards ===
The game releases new cards through a booster system. The first booster is small, with only three cards. Successive boosters have more. The distribution appears random, with exception to the Return to Ravnica block, which yields 4 guild gates of the player's chosen colors. After defeating the final opponent, each realm can be returned to in order to compete against much more difficult decks for additional boosters. The alternative is to purchase additional cards or card sets as in-app purchases.

== Reception ==
Reception

Aggregate score
Aggregator	Score
Metacritic	60/100

Review scores
Publication	Score
Game Informer	8.75/10
IGN	4.5/10
PC Gamer (US)	30/100

PC Gamer's Tom Senior rated the game 30/100, writing, "At best it's a frustrating, poorly paced experience with fewer features than its predecessors, at worst, Magic 2015 is a cynical redesign that wants to suck more money out of players. As such, I'm unable to recommend Magic 2015 to anyone at all."

Game Informer's Daniel Tack rated the game 88/100, praising its addition of a deck customization feature but wishing for other game modes.

IGN's Leif Johnson gave it a 4.5/10, saying "MTG: Duels of the Planeswalkers at last adds customization, but ruins it with microtransactions and grindy gameplay" and that "it's a shame that the 2015 version of this once-proud game feels best defined by what it lacks".
