= Carmageddon TDR 2000 =

2000 video game

- Cover art of the European Windows version
- Developer: Torus Games
- Publishers: EU: Sales Curve Interactive; NA: Xicat Interactive
- Designers: Andrew McGinnes; Simon Short
- Composer: Des Tounge
- Platform: Windows
- Release: EU: September 8, 2000; NA: October 9, 2000
- Genres: Vehicular combat, racing
- Modes: Single-player, multiplayer

Carmageddon TDR 2000 (also known as Carmageddon: Total Destruction Racing 2000 or Carmageddon 3: TDR 2000 in North America), is a vehicular combat video game. The sequel to Carmageddon II: Carpocalypse Now, it was developed by Torus Games and released in the United Kingdom on September 8, 2000.

A Game Boy Color version of the game was slated to be released but was cancelled. After the negative reception of Carmageddon TDR 2000, the Carmageddon series went dormant for over a decade, with the next installment, Carmageddon: Reincarnation, not entering development until 2011.

== Description ==
Driving around the first level, The Boulevard

Pedestrians can be killed by immolation (being set on fire) or collisions.

During development of TDR 2000, SCi hired Tozzer.com to create an online comic based on the Carmageddon video game.

== Expansion pack ==
The Nosebleed Pack released 2001 was the official expansion pack for TDR2000 adding new vehicles, environments, powerups and improved multiplayer modes with extra maps. It was later released as a free patch. The soundtrack is by Plague and Utah Saints.

== Reception ==
Reception

Aggregate scores
Aggregator	Score
GameRankings	61.79%
Metacritic	48/100

Review scores
Publication	Score
AllGame	3.5/5
GameSpot	5.7/10
IGN	5.8/10
PC Gamer (US)	59%
PC Zone	6.9/10
Playboy	60%

The game received a score of 61.79% from GameRankings and 48 out of 100 from Metacritic.
