= Risk: Factions =

2010 video game

- Developer: Stainless Games
- Publisher: Electronic Arts
- Designer: Simone McDermott
- Programmers: Ben Lyons; Nick Slaven
- Artist: Will McCourt
- Writer: Robert Levine
- Composer: Jamey Scott
- Platforms: Xbox 360 (XBLA), PlayStation 3 (PSN), Windows (Steam), Facebook Platform
- Release: 23 June 2010; 21 December 2010 (PSN); 9 March 2011 (Steam)
- Genre: Strategy
- Modes: Single-player, Multiplayer

Risk: Factions was a downloadable video game for Xbox 360's Xbox Live Arcade service, PlayStation 3's PlayStation Network, and Windows computers through Steam. The game was announced on January 12, 2010 for Xbox 360, December 21, 2010 for PlayStation 3, and March 8, 2011 for Windows. Based on Hasbro's popular board game Risk, the game featured both single player and online modes of play.

== Gameplay ==
In addition to the brand new Factions game variation, Risk: Factions also features a Classic game variation derived directly from the 2008 Risk rule set. Players race to complete three objectives while retaining control of their capitals to win the game. Alternatively, a player may opt to have all the opponents eliminated for a domination victory. The game is played by 2 to 5 players, depending on the size of the map. For example, the classic World map is available for a 3-to-5-player game.

The features exclusive to the Factions game variation are overkills and terrain features. Overkills are awarded by rolling two or three sixes. If a player rolls two sixes, he destroys twice as many units as he would normally. If a player rolls three sixes, he destroys all the opponent's units in the current battle. Some maps have special terrain features like the volcano, which can erupt and kill all units but one in surrounding territories, or the temple, which allows the player controlling it to convert an opponent-controlled territory of his choice and all units within it to his color.

The Factions game variation also includes a single player campaign, divided into 5 chapters. In each chapter, the player will get to play as one of the five factions, and completing a chapter unlocks maps for custom games and multiplayer.

== Factions ==
- Humans - Color: Green - Leader: General William P. "Fatty" McGutterpants - A jingoistic army general with a distinctive American accent. He is always seen with his pet dog. He also has a blue-colored palette swap named Major Nolens, who appears in the first chapter of campaign mode as his opponent.
- Cats - Color: Yellow - Leader: Generalissimo Meow - A Hispanic-accented cat dressed like Mao Zedong. He launches an attack on the Humans after a mortar is "accidentally" dropped on his country (courtesy of McGutterpants' dog) and McGutterpants refuses to apologize.
- Robots - Color: Red - Leader: Commandant SixFour - An untested automated defense system built by the Humans. Unfortunately, due to his obsolete graphics technology, he is incapable of distinguishing allies from enemies and declares war on the rest of the factions. His name is a reference to the Commodore 64.
- Zombies - Color: Black - Leader: Colonel Claus Von Stiffenberg (a.k.a. "Stiffy") - A hook and eyepatch-wearing zombie who declares war on the other factions after being attacked by the Humans. Like the rest of the faction, he was presumably either an ordinary human or a revived corpse, mutated by an experimental bioweapon launched by Commandant SixFour. His name is a reference to Claus von Stauffenberg.
- Yetis - Color: Blue - Leader: His Excellency Gary - A Buddha-like yeti monk with a jovial attitude like the Dalai Lama. Ironically, he declares war when General McGutterpants asks for his help to bring peace with the other factions.

== Dice probabilities ==
In the Factions game variation, it is possible for a player to gain the ability to use up to a fourth die when attacking and/or a third die when defending. This, along with the overkill and super-overkill features, makes the probabilities of winning battles different from the original Risk board game rules. Below is a table summarizing the dice probabilities for the factions game type: (Note: The probability table makes the following assumptions about the rules of Risk: Factions, which are not explicitly defined: If both the attacker and the defender roll an overkill or super-overkill, the defender's overkill overrides and is the only one that counts.; The defender using 3 dice has the chance of rolling a super-overkill.; If the attacker rolls an overkill, while the defender rolls even a single six, the attacker's overkill is annulled.)

Attacking dice	4	4	4	3	3	3	2	2	2	1	1	1
Defending dice	3	2	1	3	2	1	3	2	1	3	2	1
Attacker loses all	0.5%			0.5%			0.5%					
Attacker loses 4	7%	2.8%		7%	2.8%		7%	2.8%				
Attacker loses 2	30.6%	18.2%		40.2%	31.2%		54.4%	42.1%				
Attacker loses 1			29.3%			34%			41.7%	82.7%	74.5%	58.3%
Both lose 1	31.2%	33.1%		29.2%	24.3%		25.5%	32.4%				
Defender loses 1			70.7%			66%			58.3%	17.3%	25.5%	41.7%
Defender loses 2	23.1%	36.7%		18.8%	35.5%		11%	20.8%				
Defender loses 4	6.7%	8.0%		4.0%	5.8%		1.6%	1.9%				
Defender loses all	0.9%	1.2%		0.3%	0.4%							
Attacker wins	30.7%	45.9%	70.7%	23.1%	41.7%	66%	12.6%	22.7%	58.3%	17.3%	25.5%	41.7%
Defender wins	38.1%	21%	29.3%	47.7%	34%	34%	61.9%	44.9%	41.7%	82.7%	74.5%	58.3%
Tie	31.2%	33.2%	0%	29.2%	24.3%	0%	25.5%	32.4%	0%	0%	0%	0%

== Reception ==
Risk: Factions received generally favourable reviews upon release, with a Metacritic average of 77%.

Destructoid praised the developer for not just making a copy of the traditional board game with the console version. The reviewer said: "Clearly a lot of time was put into making sure Factions not only overflowed with personality, but was also able to capture the interest of new players. I can't recommend this game enough, especially at such an affordable price."

1UP.com said that "while the factions aspect could have been fleshed out a bit more, the title still stands as a solid update to the game and a worthwhile purchase for strategy fans."

PC PowerPlay rated Factions favorably, considering whilst it was not a definitive version of Risk, it design was colourful and gave it character, "breathing life into a game that, nowadays, is just a little bit stale".

== Discontinuation ==
=== Xbox Live ===
As of 2014, RISK: Factions is no longer available for purchase on Xbox Live's Arcade Marketplace.

=== Steam ===
Some time around October 2020, the Steam version of the game was made unavailable for purchase at the request of Electronic Arts, presumably because Electronic Arts had lost the Hasbro license for Risk at the time.
