= Zone Warrior =

1997 video game

- Developer: Julian James
- Publisher: Casady & Greene
- Platforms: Mac OS, iOS
- Release: 1997: Mac; 2008: iOS
- Genre: Space combat simulator
- Mode: Single-player

Zone Warrior is a three-dimensional space combat simulator game written by Julian James for Mac OS and published by Casady & Greene in 1997. It was originally released as ZOA (for Zone of Avoidance). In Zone Warrior, the player is the lone defender of a remote space station under attack by aliens.

The game was followed by a sequel, then Julian James ported the original to iOS.

== Reception ==
=== Mac OS ===
Zone Warrior (Mac OS)

Review score
Publication	Score
MacUser	4/5

The Macintosh Bible Guide to Games commented on the "remarkable" level of detail of the graphics. Games Domain wrote: "This game may not appeal to everyone but those of you who like shoot-em-up action, won't be disappointed in Zone Warrior and I highly recommend it."

=== iOS ===
IGN praised the graphics and controls, comparing it the 1979 arcade game Asteroids, finding the early levels easy but the later very challenging. Touch Arcade called it "an enjoyable shooter", comparing it to Star Raiders and again Asteroids. Pocket Gamer awarded the game its silver award rating, despite finding the controls challenging.

== Legacy ==
A sequel, Zone Warrior II, was released for OS X in 2001.
