= Carmageddon =

1997 video game

- European cover art
- Developer: Stainless Games
- Publishers: EU: Sales Curve Interactive; NA: Interplay Productions; Aspyr (Mac OS); HandyGames (iOS, Android); THQ Nordic (PC)
- Producer: Mark Teal
- Designers: Neil Barnden; Patrick Buckland
- Programmer: Patrick Buckland
- Artist: Neil Barnden
- Composer: Lee Groves
- Series: Carmageddon
- Engine: BRender
- Platforms: MS-DOS, Windows, Mac OS, iOS, Android
- Release: MS-DOS: SWE: June 13, 1997; EU: June 20, 1997; US: July 16, 1997; Windows, Mac OS; 1997 iOS; October 17, 2012; Android; May 10, 2013
- Genres: Vehicular combat, racing
- Modes: Single player, multiplayer

Carmageddon is a vehicular combat video game released for PC in 1997. It was produced by Stainless Games and published by Interplay Productions and Sales Curve Interactive. It was ported to other platforms, and spawned a series.

In 2011, Stainless Games obtained the rights to Carmageddon from Square Enix Europe (now Eidos Interactive). iOS and Android ports were released in 2012 and 2013, respectively. THQ Nordic acquired the rights to the Carmageddon series from Stainless Games in December 2018.

== Gameplay ==
Die Anna drives through the "Coastal Carnage" level.

The player races a vehicle against several other computer-controlled competitors in various settings, including city, mine and industrial areas. The player has a certain amount of time to complete each race, and more time may be gained by collecting bonuses, damaging the competitors' cars or by running over pedestrians.

Races are completed by either completing the course as one would a normal racing game, "wasting" (wrecking) all other race cars or killing all pedestrians on the level. The game includes thirty-six racetracks, played across eleven different locations. The game features three instrumental remixes from Fear Factory's second studio album Demanufacture (1995).

== Development ==
The game that became Carmageddon started out as 3D Destruction Derby, a banger racing sim prototyped by Stainless Software. This was signed by SCi in 1995, with the condition that it be made into a licensed game to guarantee popularity. Initially, SCi wanted to use the Mad Max license, but was unable to find out who owned the rights to the franchise. It instead secured the Death Race 2000 (1975) license, as a sequel to the original film was at that time planned.

According to head programmer Patrick Buckland, the initial concept stemmed from team members getting bored while playing racing games, leading them to ultimately drive in the wrong direction and crash into other cars. They decided it made sense to create a game where this was the objective to begin with. Shortly after, Psygnosis released a game with this same concept, Destruction Derby (1995).

The notion of running over pedestrians was added to distinguish the game from Destruction Derby and arouse controversy. However, there had been a number of recent games which involved running over pedestrians, such as Quarantine and Die Hard Trilogy. Rob Henderson from SCi suggested increasing the potential for controversy by awarding the player points for the pedestrian kills.

The sequel to Death Race 2000 was later cancelled, but by this point SCi were impressed enough by Stainless's work that they felt Stainless could try creating their own intellectual property. The name Carmageddon was coined, and development proceeded with the designers allowed unusually free rein with regard to the content of the game.

The game uses the BRender engine, which Stainless Software were already thoroughly familiar with; one of their previous contracts was to port BRender to Macintosh and build the corresponding tools and demos. The PlayStation conversion was subcontracted to developer Elite, with the plan to release the PC and PlayStation versions simultaneously. Buckland anticipated that Elite would have problems with the conversion due to Carmageddon's open environments.

== Release ==
Carmageddon was originally released for MS-DOS, Windows, and Mac OS in 1997. It won the "Game of the Year" trophy in the 1997 PC Zone reader awards and "Driving Game of the Year" 1997. An expansion pack, Splat Pack, was released in 1997. It included new tracks, vehicles, environments, network levels, and 3Dfx support.

The Carmageddon Max Pack, released on February 17, 1998, bundled the original game and its expansion pack into one package. As a bonus, it also included a strategy guide, mousepad, and a leather car key chain with Carmageddon's logo. During the inaugural Interactive Achievement Awards, the Max Pack received a nomination for "PC Action Game of the Year" by the Academy of Interactive Arts & Sciences.

A port was in development for the Gizmondo, but was never released. Carmageddon and its expansion Splat Pack were released on GOG.com on September 27, 2012, for modern operating systems. In addition, a port of the game for Apple's mobile devices (iPod Touch, iPhone, iPad) was released on October 17 the same year. In July 2011, the City of Los Angeles launched a massive media campaign under the title "Carmageddon" to warn drivers about a major closure on the 405 Freeway during the weekend of July 15–17. Stainless Games capitalized on the coincidence to promote the upcoming Carmageddon releases by announcing on the official web site that "L.A. Celebrates Carmageddon" and "Yes, it's official! The news that Carmageddon is back has been such a hit in California, that the authorities have decided to dedicate a whole weekend to the game!"

A port for Android based devices was released on May 10, 2013.

=== Controversy ===
In many countries (including Germany and, for a short time, the United Kingdom), the first release of the game was censored.

The censored version contained zombies with green blood or robots with black oil instead of humans, as running over the non-human figures was considered more acceptable by their respective ratings boards. In the United Kingdom, the BBFC refused to certify the game unless all blood and gore was removed. After ten months of appeal, the BBFC certified the original version.

In some countries, such as Brazil, the game was banned completely. The game, along with the sale and distribution of video games "oriented towards the destruction of people" with vehicles, was banned in the capital city of Buenos Aires, Argentina in 1998. In Australia, the game was passed completely uncut with a MA15+ rating.

== Reception ==
Carmageddon

Aggregate scores
Aggregator	Score	
Aggregator	iOS	PC
GameRankings	72%	90%
Metacritic	74/100	N/A

Review scores
Publication	Score	
Publication	iOS	PC
Edge	N/A	6/10
GameRevolution	N/A	B+
GameSpot	N/A	8.8/10
Next Generation	N/A	4/5
PC Gamer (US)	N/A	78%
PC PowerPlay	N/A	90%

According to the co-founders of Stainless Games, about two million copies of the Carmageddon series were sold in total. NPD Techworld, a firm that tracked sales in the United States, reported 118,500 units sold of Carmageddon's computer version by December 2002.

GameSpot was enamoured of the open ended, chaotic nature of the game, commenting that "Carmageddon touches that particular collective nerve that fuses the wholesome popularity of the All-American Racing Game with the homicidal singularity of the 70s cult film into an onscreen experience that can only be compared to the kind of automotive mayhem that a five-year-old American male wreaks with his Matchbox and Hot Wheels cars." Next Generation stated that "if you're willing to sweep your morals under the rug for a while, and shamelessly commit auto homicide on a grand scale, then Carmageddon is an absolute blast." GamePro gave a more mixed review, commenting that the game is intense and high on longevity, but that its focus on wanton destruction and gore is in questionable taste and ultimately to the detriment of the gameplay. They also found the graphics mediocre and the controls when using a keyboard to be "frustrating and sluggish".

== Legacy ==
Carmageddon had two sequels, Carmageddon II: Carpocalypse Now (1998) and Carmageddon TDR 2000 (2000). SCi planned Carmageddon 4 for a release in the end of 2005. In August 2005 SCi (at the time operating under the name Eidos), put development at Visual Science on hold for unspecified reasons.

=== Mobile versions ===
In 2005, Swedish publisher Synergenix released two adaptations of the game for mobile devices entitled Carmageddon and Carmageddon 3D, developed by Impressionware and Kampo Interactive, respectively. Released on July 4, 2005, Carmageddon features a top-down perspective for lower-end Java devices. The game was later made available for BREW-compatible devices. Carmageddon 3D features three-dimensional graphics and was released on November 29, 2005, for Symbian and Mophun-based mobile devices.

=== Reboot and spin-off ===
A reboot of the series, Carmageddon: Reincarnation, was developed by Stainless Games, who re-acquired the rights to the Carmageddon name and released the game in May 2015. The game was downloadable for Windows, exclusively through Steam. Funding for the game came partially from a Kickstarter campaign and donations through their main website. Further funds were secured from Les Edgar (co-founder of Bullfrog Productions). An updated version of the game, Carmageddon: Max Damage, was released the following year for Windows, PlayStation 4, and Xbox One. Max Damage was given a wider release, and as a result, Reincarnation was delisted from Steam. Unlike Max Damage, Reincarnation was never physically released. Max Damage was given to owners of Reincarnation as a free upgrade.

In 2018, THQ Nordic bought the rights to the Carmageddon intellectual property. On August 3, 2021, THQ Nordic announced a Carmageddon-themed tournament in their Wreckfest racing game. It includes two race tracks, "Bleak City" and "Devil's Canyon", and the Eagle R car from Max Damage.

In December 2025, a spin-off of the Carmageddon franchise, titled Carmageddon: Rogue Shift, was announced by 34BigThings. It was described as having roguelite elements, and due to its status as a spin-off, was noted to feature deviations from the main series, such as weapons on the vehicles, zombies instead of humans, a less comedic tone, dynamic weather, and upgradeable vehicles. It was given a release date of early 2026. 34BigThings had previously created the futuristic racing series Redout. They were acquired by Embracer Group in 2020.

== See also ==
- GTI Club
- Interstate '76
- Midtown Madness
- Streets of SimCity
