= Television censorship =

Television censorship is the censorship of television content, either through the excising of certain frames or scenes, or outright banning of televisions in their entirety. Television censorship typically occurs as a result of political or moral objections to a television's content; controversial content subject to censorship include the depiction of graphic violence, sexual situations, or racial themes. Censorship standards vary widely by country, and can vary within an individual country over time.

== Rating systems ==
A television content rating system is designated to classify television with regard to suitability for audiences in terms of issues such as sex, violence, substance abuse, profanity, impudence or other types of obscene content. A particular issued rating can be called a certification, classification, certificate.

== By country ==
=== China ===
The Chinese government has repeatedly censored anime shows that the country considers immoral, especially those that include bloody and violent scenes. Blood-C, a Japanese anime television series, has been banned since it includes a "particularly bloody" scene which may cause "extreme discomfort". In 2021, China announced to ban violent, vulgar, and bloody children's TV shows. A statement released by the National Radio and Television Administration said that "the content of broadcasts should be healthy and progressive and should promote truth, good, and beauty in cartoons".

The battle part of first episode of the eighth season of Game of Thrones is cut in China.

=== Japan ===
Unlike Naruto: Shippuden on Disney XD censored in the United States, the Disney Channel Japan launched "Disney Channel Japan Anime" as programming block that shows other adult anime compilation differently that aired Made in Abyss, Re:Zero and others. Kids Station and Cartoon Network Japan NiTE programming blocks children's network aired other adult anime with contains inappropriate content unlike other countries.

== List of banned television series ==
For nearly the entire history of television production, certain televisions have been banned by television censorship or review organizations for political or moral reasons or for controversial content, such as racism, copyright violation, and underage immorality. Censorship standards vary widely by country, and can vary within an individual country over time due to political or moral change.

Many countries have government-appointed or private commissions to censor and rate productions for film and television exhibition. While it is common for television (including episodes) to be edited to fall into certain rating classifications, this list includes only television that have been explicitly prohibited from public screening. In some countries, television are banned on a wide scale; these are not listed in this table.

=== Australia ===
Date	Title	Notes
2017	Peppa Pig	The episode "Mister Skinnylegs" was banned in September 2017 due to a scene which shows the main character, Peppa Pig, holding a spider.
2023	How Not to Summon a Demon Lord Ω	On 4 January 2023, the Australian Classification Board refused classification for How Not to Summon a Demon Lord Ω but did not provide a reason, thus banning the series from being sold, hired, advertised or imported to Australia, despite being available for streaming. A censored version was later released on Blu-Ray with an MA15+ classification for "strong sexual themes and sexualised imagery."

=== China ===
Date	Title	Notes
2014	The Big Bang Theory	Banned due to copyright violations problems of clause 16 of the rules of online broadcasting.
2014	The Good Wife	Banned due to copyright violations problems of clause 16 of the rules of online broadcasting.
2014	NCIS	Banned due to copyright violations problems of clause 16 of the rules of online broadcasting.
2014	The Practice	Banned due to copyright violations problems of clause 16 of the rules of online broadcasting.
2015	Afro Samurai	Banned due to extremely violent scenes.
2015	Another	Banned due to gore scenes.
2015	Attack on Titan	The series was banned by the Chinese Military of Culture due to gore and violent scenes.
2015	Blood-C	Banned due to bloody violence.
2015	Corpse Party	Banned due to bloody violence.
2015	Date A Live II	Banned due to sexually explicit scenes.
2015	Deadman Wonderland	Banned due to graphic violence.
2015	Death Note	Banned due to violence.
2015	Devilman Lady	Banned due to explicit nudity and violence.
2015	Devil May Cry: The Animated Series	Banned due to graphic violence.
2015	Elfen Lied	Banned due to extreme violence and nudity.
2015	Ergo Proxy	
2015	Highschool of the Dead	Banned due to bloody violence and sexually explicit scenes.
2015	Inferno Cop	Banned due to strong violence.
2015	Mnemosyne	
2015	Parasyte: The Maxim	Banned due to strong violence.
2015	Psycho-Pass	Banned due to strong violence.
2015	School Days	Banned due to strong violence.
2015	The Skull Man	Banned due to strong violence.
2015	Strike the Blood	Banned due to strong violence and nudity.
2015	Sword Art Online II	Banned due to strong violence.
2015	Terror in Resonance	Banned due to the portrayal of terrorism based on real life.
2015	The Testament of Sister New Devil	Banned due to graphic sex and nudity scenes.
2015	Those Who Hunt Elves	
2015	Tokyo ESP	
2015	Tokyo Ravens	
2015	Tokyo Ghoul √A	
2016	Doctor Who	
?	Aesthetica of a Rogue Hero	
?	High School DxD	Banned due to many nudity scenes.
2018	Peppa Pig	Banned due to characters being used subversively.
2019	South Park	After the episode Band in China aired in Hong Kong, the series was completely banned from deleting all Chinese websites that they were apologizing to their series.
2020	My Hero Academia	Banned due to characters' names referencing the horrific wartime experimentations of Unit 731.
2023	The Simpsons	

=== Egypt ===
Date	Title	Notes
	Family Guy	

=== France ===
Date	Title	Notes
1990	Kinnikuman	

=== India ===
Date	Title	Notes
1997	Cow and Chicken	
	Family Guy	
2008	Crayon Shin-chan	
2021	Record of Ragnarok	

=== Indonesia ===
Date	Title	Notes
	Family Guy	

=== Iran ===
Date	Title	Notes
	Modern Family	
	Family Guy	
2024	The Assassins	

=== Japan ===
Date	Title	Notes
2000	Excel Saga	The final episode never aired on TV Tokyo for causing to be banned for explicit violence and nudity scenes.
2015	Mr. Osomatsu	Banned due to copyright law problems.

=== Kazakhstan ===
Date	Title	Notes
2000	Da Ali G Show	
2021	High School DxD	
2021	Why the Hell Are You Here, Teacher!?	
2021	The Qwaser of Stigmata	
2021	Assassination Classroom	
2021	Angels of Death	
2021	Bungo Stray Dogs	
2021	Beyond the Boundary	
2021	Durarara!!	
2021	Tsugumomo	

=== Kuwait ===
Date	Title	Notes
2000	South Park	

=== New Zealand ===
Date	Title	Notes
1995	Mighty Morphin Power Rangers	
?	Puni Puni Poemy	
2014	High School DxD	Banned on the grounds of sexual exploitation of children. The OFLC stated in their report publications were banned if containing what the board felt was "to reinforce the notion that young persons are sexually desirable and available".

=== Malaysia ===
Date	Title	Notes
1995	Mighty Morphin Power Rangers	
	Monty Python's Flying Circus	
	Family Guy	

=== Philippines ===
Date	Title	Notes
1979	Voltes V	Banned due to "harmful effects on children".

=== Russia ===
Date	Title	Notes
?	Fate/kaleid liner Prisma Illya	Banned due to child pornography laws.
2021	Death Note	In 2021, the series was banned by St. Petersburg due to depiction of violence, murder and cruelty scenes.
2021	Inuyashiki	Banned, due to depiction of violence, murder and cruelty scenes.
2021	Tokyo Ghoul	Banned, due to depiction of violence, murder and cruelty scenes.
2021	Elfen Lied	Banned due to nudity and violence scenes.
2021	Interspecies Reviewers	Banned due to sexually explicit scenes.
2021	Naruto	Banned due to depiction of violence, murder and cruelty scenes.
2021	Aki Sora	Banned due to incest sexuality explicit scenes.
2021	Terror in Resonance	Banned due to terrorist based on the real life.
2021	Demon King Daimao	
2021	The Fruit of Grisaia	
2021	Maoyu	
2021	Manyu Scroll	
2021	Darwin's Game	
2021	In/Spectre	
2021	Happy Sugar Life	
2021	That Time I Got Reincarnated as a Slime	
2021	KonoSuba	
2021	Zombie Land Saga	
2021	Princess Lover!	
2021	Nekopara	
2021	Happy Tree Friends	Banned due to depictions of violence.
2021	Attack on Titan	Banned due to concern for the welfare of youth.
2022	Hell Girl	
2022	No Game No Life	Banned due to child pornography scenes.
2023	Family Guy	

=== Saudi Arabia ===
Date	Title	Notes
?	Pokémon	
?	Sailor Moon	

=== Singapore ===
Date	Title	Notes
1990	Sex and the City	
2018	South Park	

=== South Africa ===
Date	Title	Notes
	Knots Landing	
	Family Guy	

=== South Korea ===
Date	Title	Notes
	M*A*S*H	Banned due to Korean war.M*A*S*H-ish 7: 70th Anniversary of the End of the Korean War
2001	South Park	Banned due to episode Death scene before airing on Tooniverse.
2009	Hetalia: Axis Powers	On January 11, 2009, after the series aired Kids Station in Japan, the series was completely banned in South Korea due to appearing Korean characters.
	Family Guy	

=== Taiwan ===
Date	Title	Notes
	Family Guy	

=== United States ===
Date	Title	Notes
	Assassination Classroom	

=== Vietnam ===
Date	Title	Notes
	Family Guy	

=== Venezuela ===
Date	Title	Notes
?	The Simpsons	
	Family Guy	

== See also ==
- List of books banned by governments
- List of banned films
- List of banned video games
