= Step on It! (video game) =

1996 video game

Step On It!
- Publisher(s): Casady & Greene
- Platform(s): classic Mac OS, Mac OS X
- Release: 1996 (classic Mac OS), 2002 (Mac OS X)
- Genre(s): Arcade, Puzzle
- Mode(s): Single player Multiplayer

Step On It! is a game that was released in 1996 for the Apple Macintosh and 2002 for Mac OS X. The game was published by Casady & Greene. The game is a puzzle game, with various challenges that are all family friendly.

The player takes control of a robotic man named Ted, and gets through levels by building blocks, solving puzzles, and obtaining keys. This game is based on a much older arcade game called Solomon's Key which is now available on the Wii Virtual Console.
