= Robin Casady =

American businessman (died 2020)

Robin Casady (died October 5, 2020) was the founder of Casady & Greene, a Macintosh software publisher and developer, in 1984 to publish fonts for the Macintosh 128K, the original Macintosh. After the closure of Casady & Greene, Casady worked with Mike Wright on updating and publishing the iData freeform database. Robin Casady was also involved in design and mfg. of high-end amateur astronomy gear, and pursuing a lifelong hobby in fine arts photography.
