= KZ Manager =

- Logo
- Developer: The Missionaries
- Publisher: German Elite
- Designers: Messias; Prince Porn
- Engine: N/A
- Platforms: Commodore 64, Amiga, MS-DOS, Windows
- Release: 1988–2000 (depends on version)
- Genre: Construction and management simulation
- Mode: Single-player

KZ Manager is a name shared by many similar resource management computer video games that put the player in the role of a Nazi concentration camp (Konzentrationslager, KZ) commandant or "manager", where the "resources" to be managed include, depending on the version of the game, prisoners (either Jews, Turks or Romani), poison gas supplies, "normal" money and various equipment, as well as "public opinion" on the "productivity" of the camp. The game has been indexed by the German Federal Department for Media Harmful to Young Persons and was confiscated in October 1990 by the district court of Neu-Ulm for violating German Criminal Code Section 130 (Incitement of masses), meaning that it is forbidden to distribute or promote the game in Germany.

== Gameplay ==
The goal of the game is to keep the camp functioning by keeping the "public opinion" or other important resources and gauges over or under a certain threshold. In one version, public opinion rises when the "manager" executes a number of prisoners with Zyklon B. However, ordering said gas costs money, which can be gathered by forcing the prisoners to work.

Spending too much time without a "sufficient" number of executions makes "public satisfaction" drop, and having too few working prisoners will soon drive to a resource shortage, and closing of the camp, thus losing the game. Also, prisoners must be "purchased" by the camp's "manager", and the corpses of the deceased prisoners must be disposed of (the game describes them as "Müllberg", German for "garbage mountain" or "pile of garbage"), an operation which also has an associated cost.

Like other resource management games, this means that ultimately the goal of the game is trying to find an optimal balance and timing between expenses, income, actions and "production goals", although with a highly controversial twist.

== History ==
In 1991, The New York Times reported that KZ Manager was one of about 140 games with similar themes. Austrian newspapers reported that a poll of students in one city found 39 percent knew of the games and 22 percent had encountered them. "KZ" is the German shorthand for concentration camp (Konzentrationslager).

== Versions ==
Each game version was released several times and began to circulate in Austria and Germany during the 1990s, the earliest versions being for the C64, MS-DOS, text mode games, graphical MS-DOS versions as well as a Windows version titled KZ Manager Millennium. According to a 1991 article written by Linda Rohrbough, an Amiga version has been found to exist. Gameplay and graphics of the Amiga version and its 256 color DOS port were more advanced than in the original C64 game.
