= Crystal Quest =

1987 video game

- Developers: Patrick Buckland (Mac); Stainless Games (Xbox 360); Game Mechanics LLC (Windows)
- Publishers: Casady & Greene (Mac); Stainless Games (Xbox 360); Game Mechanics LLC (Windows)
- Platforms: Macintosh, Apple IIGS, Xbox 360, Palm, Game Boy, Amiga, iOS, Windows
- Release: 1987: Macintosh; 2006: Xbox 360; 2016: Windows
- Genre: Action
- Mode: Single-player

Crystal Quest is an action game written by Patrick Buckland for the Macintosh and published by Casady & Greene in 1987. It was ported to the Apple IIGS in 1989 by Rebecca Heineman. Ports were also made to the Amiga, Game Boy, iOS, and Palm. It was the first game to support the color displays of the Macintosh II.

The game was based on the original shareware game Crystal Raider, one of the supporters of which had been Michael Greene, founder of Greene, Inc. (later to merge with CasadyWare to become Casady & Greene). A sequel, similar to the original game, Crystal Crazy, was released in 1993.

On February 7, 2006 Crystal Quest was released on Xbox 360 via Xbox Live Arcade and in 2008 for iPhone and iPod touch.

Game Mechanics LLC licensed Crystal Quest and launched a Kickstarter to raise money to create a new version in February 2015. Although the Kickstarter was unsuccessful, Crystal Quest was released on Steam on November 23, 2016.

== Development ==
Crystal Quest is easier to play in color mode on the Macintosh version as opposed to monochrome, as more RAM is used, causing enemies to move slower. Improvements and features in Crystal Quest over its predecessor Crystal Raider include a two-player mode, support for color, improved sound, and a demo mode. A glitch in the demo mode for early copies of Crystal Quest caused system errors on one out of ten Mac IIs, and those affected could call Greene Inc. for a replacement copy of the game.

== Reception ==
Macworld reviewed the Macintosh version of Crystal Quest, praising its action gameplay and colorful graphics, stating that Crystal Quest is "Fast, challenging action ... You learn to play in minutes because the game is so intuitive ... Crystal Quest is especially fun to play on a color Mac II because the vivid color-cycle graphics rival those of the finest arcade games. ... Crystal Quest is the first Macintosh game I've found that truly compares in features and quality with a real arcade game." Macworld also praises the "clever" sound effects, stating that "some of the sounds are droll, and some are gross. Kids will love them." but criticizes one particular sound effect, saying that "The sound that accompanies the player's entrance into the gateway at the end of each wave, however, is a digitized pseudo-female-orgasmic gasp that several women I played it for found offensive."
