= Mission Thunderbolt =

1992 video game

Mission: Thunderbolt
- Developer: Dave Scheifler
- Publisher: Casady & Greene
- Designer: Dave Scheifler
- Series: Jaunt Trooper
- Platforms: DEC, Mac OS, Windows
- Release: 1992
- Genre: Roguelike
- Mode: Single-player

Mission: Thunderbolt is a roguelike video game developed in 1986 commercially released in 1992. Developed by Dave Scheifler for Digital Equipment Corporation mainframe computers, it was later released as Doomsday 2000 on Mac OS and Windows.

== Gameplay ==
Players control a character in 16 randomly generated levels from a top-down view. Players are able to discover and interact with items of varying value and purpose. The chances for the generation of these items, alongside for enemy encounter rates are randomly generated at the start of each game.

The player's statistics are based on character values from Dungeons & Dragons: Players can have different values for strength, dexterity, and constitution. Players who complete Mission: Thunderbolt can import character data into the Mac OS exclusive sequel, Mission: Firestorm.

== Plot ==
A resistance force has developed in an alien-occupied Earth, and the player protagonist is sent to retrieve an anti-matter bomb in a military installation under the Appalachian Mountains. Alien forces arrive there force, and attempt to destroy the human invaders.

== Release ==
Doomsday 2000 was initially conceived of as a four-part game with interlinked stories, each part being a special "mission" for the heroic character (Captain Hazard) whose role people assumed within the game. Mission: Thunderbolt was the first of the missions, and it was the only mission in the 1987 release. This initial game was later expanded over time to also include Mission: Firestorm. The third mission (Quicksilver) and the fourth mission (Tsunami) never left the concept stage.

Casady & Greene published a version of the game's first mission as Mission: Thunderbolt for Mac OS in 1991, and later Windows. John Calhoun provided enhanced creature artwork for that commercial release. Few copies were sold and so was not a commercial success for its author.

The second mission was subsequently released by the author himself for Mac OS as JauntTrooper, Mission: Firestorm by way of a hobby, rather than a commercial venture, as was a Windows version of the first mission, JauntTrooper, Mission: Thunderbolt.

== Reception ==
Mission: Thunderbolt was awarded "4 Mice" by MacUser magazine, which called it a complex, sometimes frustrating game that requires forethought and cunning. Macworld inducted the game into its 1992 Game Hall of Fame in the Best Role-playing Game category.

Mission: Thunderbolt was reviewed in 1993 in Dragon #189 by Hartley, Patricia, and Kirk Lesser in "The Role of Computers" column. The reviewers gave the game 3 out of 5 stars.
