= Fight of Gods =

2017 fighting game by Taiwanese indie developer

- Developer: Digital Crafter
- Publishers: Digital Crafter exA-Arcadia (Arcade Edition)
- Platforms: Windows, Switch, PlayStation 4, Arcade
- Release: September 7, 2017 (Windows); January 18, 2019 (Switch); July 16, 2020 (Playstation 4); November 13, 2020 (Arcade)
- Genre: Fighting game
- Modes: Single-player, multiplayer
- Arcade system: exA-Arcadia

Fight of Gods is a 2017 fighting game by Taiwanese indie developer Digital Crafter consisting of a roster of figures pertaining to world religions and mythologies. The game was banned in Thailand, Indonesia, Malaysia and Singapore due to religious content. It also resulted in Malaysia's Steam store access to be blocked for 24 hours. It was released in Japan on December 24, 2020.

== Playable Gods ==
- Amaterasu
- Anubis
- Athena
- Beliar (exclusive to the Arcade version)
- Buddha (name changed to "Zen" in the PS4 version)
- Freyja
- Guan Gong
- Jesus (name changed to "Saint" in the PS4 version)
- Lamia (hidden character; guest fighter from Lamia's Game Room)
- Mazu
- Moses (name changed to "Wisdom" in the PS4 version)
- Odin
- Santa Claus
- Sif
- Susanoo
- Tudigong
- Zeus

== Arcade Edition ==
Fight of Gods Arcade Edition is an enhanced version of the game created for arcades and published worldwide by exA-Arcadia. An exclusive new character, Beliar, based upon Satan has been added to the game and all character illustrations have been drawn by Tekken 7 artist, Junny. Graphics rendering quality has increased by four times over the console versions and input lag decreased to one frame. An alternate version replacing Buddha with Zen was released in Thailand, Malaysia and Singapore due to religious content objections.
