= Carmageddon II: Carpocalypse Now =

1998 video game

- European cover art
- Developers: Stainless Games; Aqua Pacific (PS1/GBC); Software Creations (N64)
- Publishers: EU: Sales Curve Interactive; NA: Interplay Entertainment; NA: Titus Interactive (N64/GBC)
- Producer: Darren Barnett
- Designers: Patrick Buckland; Neil Barnden
- Programmer: Patrick Buckland
- Artist: Neil Barnden
- Composers: Iron Maiden; Sentience; Allister Brimble (GBC)
- Engine: Blazing Renderer
- Platforms: Windows, Mac OS, PlayStation, Nintendo 64, Game Boy Color
- Release: November 6, 1998: Windows; EU: November 6, 1998; NA: November 24, 1998 Mac OS; NA: April 16, 1999 Nintendo 64; EU: October 8, 1999; NA: July 26, 2000 PlayStation; EU: October 8, 1999 Game Boy Color; EU: October 1999; NA: April 5, 2000
- Genres: Vehicular combat, racing
- Mode: Single-player

Carmageddon II: Carpocalypse Now is a vehicular combat video game, the sequel to Carmageddon, and released in 1998 for Microsoft Windows. The game was developed by Stainless Games and published by Sales Curve Interactive in Europe and Interplay Entertainment in North America. Ports for Mac OS, PlayStation and Nintendo 64 (the latter as Carmageddon 64) were released in 1999. A 2D version for the Game Boy Color was released in Europe in 1999, and in North America in 2000 as Carmageddon.

== Gameplay ==
On the starting grid of the first level (Windows version)

Like its predecessor, Carmageddon II was subject to criticism for the level of violence portrayed in the game. It is rated 15+ by ELSPA. In some countries, the pedestrians (and animals) are zombies, and blood is turned to green slime, while in Germany, aliens replaced the pedestrians. Internet-released 'blood patches' restore the original human pedestrians. The blood pack was later released in the United Kingdom in 1999, earning the game an 18 certificate.

Carmageddon II was the first Carmageddon game to feature hardware acceleration, this was used for the higher quality damage models and higher quality levels.

Carmageddon II features new damage models for the vehicles, this includes car bodywork damage such as fenders and vehicle spoilers. Cars can also be split in half, instantly wasting them, but only if it is not repaired before it touches terrain.

Unlike the first game, Carmageddon II does not have "stealworthy cars", which are cars that have a chance to be taken if wrecked in a race and instead any car wrecked can be purchased.

== Reception ==
Reception

Aggregate score
Aggregator	Score				
Aggregator	GBC	Macintosh	N64	PC	PS
GameRankings	44%	N/A	29%	80%	34%

Review scores
Publication	Score				
Publication	GBC	Macintosh	N64	PC	PS
AllGame	3/5	4/5	3.5/5	4/5	N/A
CNET Gamecenter	N/A	N/A	N/A	8/10	N/A
Computer Games Strategy Plus	N/A	N/A	N/A	4.5/5	N/A
Computer Gaming World	N/A	N/A	N/A	3/5	N/A
GameFan	N/A	N/A	40%	N/A	N/A
GameRevolution	N/A	N/A	N/A	B+	N/A
GameSpot	3.1/10	N/A	2.1/10	7.8/10	N/A
IGN	3/10	N/A	1.3/10	7/10	N/A
N64 Magazine	N/A	N/A	8%	N/A	N/A
Nintendo Power	N/A	N/A	5.7/10	N/A	N/A
PlayStation Official Magazine – UK	N/A	N/A	N/A	N/A	3/10
PC Accelerator	N/A	N/A	N/A	7/10	N/A
PC Gamer (US)	N/A	N/A	N/A	83%	N/A

The PC version received "favorable" reviews according to video game review aggregator GameRankings, while the console versions received much lower scores.

Official UK PlayStation Magazine was scathing of the gameplay of the PlayStation version, saying that "no amount of pureed pedestrian can cover its faults." The Nintendo 64 port was ill-received, being N64 Magazine's lowest rated game at 8% from 1999 till 2004. Hyper, on the other hand, gave the same port 85%, calling it "a success, and probably more suited to the Nintendo 64 than it ever was on the PC, as this is big arcade-style silly action."

Carmageddon 64 was nominated for the "Worst Game" award at GameSpot's Best and Worst of 2000 Awards, which went to Spirit of Speed 1937. Carmageddon II (PC) was included in the retrospective book 1001 Video Games You Must Play Before You Die, which was originally published in 2010.

== Music ==
The game features a heavy metal soundtrack. Four original songs by Iron Maiden are included:

- "The Trooper"
- "Aces High"
- "Be Quick or Be Dead"
- "Man on the Edge"

Music by Sentience is also used.
