= Carmageddon: Reincarnation =

2015 video game

- Developer: Stainless Games
- Publishers: Stainless Games; THQ Nordic
- Series: Carmageddon
- Platforms: Microsoft Windows, PlayStation 4, Xbox One
- Release: Windows: WW: 21 May 2015; Max Damage; PlayStation 4, Xbox One: WW: 8 July 2016; Windows: WW: 28 October 2016
- Genres: Vehicular combat, racing
- Modes: Single-player, multiplayer

Carmageddon: Reincarnation is a vehicular combat game, the fourth in the Carmageddon series. The game was developed by Stainless Games. Reincarnation was exclusively released through Steam for Windows in 2015. One year later, the game was upgraded and given a proper worldwide release under the title Carmageddon: Max Damage. Max Damage appeared on the Windows, PlayStation 4, and Xbox One platforms, both physically and digitally.

== Development ==
A financial report in 2003 revealed that Carmageddon 4 was in development. The developers were identified as Visual Sciences. The publishers were confirmed as Take-Two Interactive's newly formed subsidiary 2K Games in North America and SCi in the rest of the world. Very little information was released about the game until late 2005, when recently merged publishers SCi and Eidos Interactive put development on hold for unspecified reasons. The game was subsequently assumed to have been canned, as no new information or press releases surfaced since that time, and Eidos moved on to focus on other projects.

In 2011, after buying back the rights to the series from then-copyright holders Square Enix Europe, original Carmageddon developers Stainless Games revealed that a new Carmageddon game was in early pre-production stages. After that numerous concept artworks and early in-game test screens were released on the official site.

The new title, Carmageddon: Reincarnation, was funded through Kickstarter in 2012. Stainless Games aimed to raise over $400,000 (£250,000) via Kickstarter in order to produce the game. People who pledged more than $1000 for the project could have the chance to be featured in the game. The $400,000 target was reached in 10 days; if the project raised to $600,000, Mac and Linux versions were also to be produced. This new target was met by the campaign's end in July with a total of $625,143 raised, but the promised Mac and Linux versions were never released. The game was released in May 2015 through the Steam digital service.

== Carmageddon: Max Damage ==
Carmageddon: Max Damage is an expansion update to Carmageddon: Reincarnation, featuring additional cars and stages, as well as improved graphics and performance. It was released on PlayStation 4 and Xbox One in July 2016. The game is available both as digital download and as a physical disc, with the disc version being distributed by Sold Out Sales & Marketing. It was later released for Microsoft Windows on 28 October, and was given as a free update to all existing owners of Reincarnation on Steam.

== Reception ==
The PC version of the game received a Metacritic score of 54%. Reviewers noted its game's similarity to classic Carmagedddon entries, but were divided on whether its retro gameplay was enjoyable in the modern era. A particular point of note was the game's extremely poor PC performance at launch, with the title struggling to run at a consistent framerate on any PC setup.

The PS4 version of Max Damage received a Metacritic score of 51%. Many reviewers remained unconvinced by the gameplay and controls, and the game's graphics were frequently criticised as outdated, although the game's performance was less widely noted by reviewers.
