= Glider (video game) =

1988 video game

- Publisher: Soft Dorothy Software
- Designer: John Calhoun
- Platform: Classic Mac OS
- Release: 1988: Classic Mac OS
- Genre: Action

Glider 4.0
- Publisher: Casady & Greene
- Platforms: Classic Mac OS, Windows
- Release: 1991: Classic Mac OS; 1994: Windows

Glider PRO
- Glider PRO box art
- Publisher: Casady & Greene
- Platforms: Classic Mac OS, OS X, iOS
- Release: 1994: Mac OS, OS X 2011: iOS (Classic); 2014: OS X (Classic)

Glider is an action game written by John Calhoun for the Mac and published as shareware in 1988 under the company name Soft Dorothy Software. The object of the game is to fly a paper plane through the rooms of a house. Air currents from heat ducts and fans affect the plane's movement, while assorted household objects are usually deadly. Some rooms have special mechanics, such as the ability to slide along grease-covered surfaces. Each room is presented as a two-dimensional side view.

In 1991, a colorized version of Glider that included a level editor was published by Casady & Greene as Glider 4.0. A version of Glider 4 for Microsoft Windows was released around 1994. In 1994, Casady & Greene published a further enhanced version of the game, Glider PRO, for the Mac. When Casady & Greene went bankrupt in 2003, the rights to the series reverted to the author, who opted for a period of time to give the game away on his website.

Calhoun wrote several other Mac games, such as Glypha, Pararena, and Stella Obscura, but Glider was the most successful.

== Gameplay ==
Most of the game takes place inside a house, but this one is outdoors

The main challenge is to simply avoid collision with the floor, or obstacles such as furniture. Moving obstacles include bouncing basketballs, popping toast, and dripping water. Candles and other burning objects present both a handy updraft and a lethal flame. Collision with "enemy" paper planes and balloons is also fatal, but these can be shot down with the use of a bonus item: rubber bands. The other bonus items are pieces of paper (extra lives), a variety of clocks (points), and batteries (temporary increased speed.) Glider PRO includes two new bonus items: aluminum foil (shielding against in-flight collisions) and helium tanks (mutually exclusive with regard to batteries, allows the glider to float upwards).

A puzzle element is added to the gameplay in the form of switches controlling vents, lighting, home applications and even enemies.

Glider 4.0 was designed around rooms inside a house and the game's theme included such elements as claustrophobia and stormy weather. Glider PRO incorporated outdoor environments in addition to indoor environments, and had a different theme which included such things as sunny weather and the start of summer vacation.

=== Houses ===
Levels are called "houses" in Glider parlance, though a level may contain any number of individual buildings, as well as outdoors, sewer, or other sections. Houses are entirely self-contained, and any of them is immediately available for play. Glider PRO was released with one real house called Slumberland, and one demonstration house. A later CD release of the game featured 14 further houses. Beyond this, a sizable number of houses are available for download on fan sites.

Houses can be created and edited using the built-in house editor in the "Classic" version of Glider PRO. A separate program for creating and editing houses was included with Glider 4.0.

== Reception ==
Reception

Review scores
Publication	Score
AllGame	4.5/5
Computer Gaming World	4/5

Inside Mac Games praised Glider PRO for its entertaining and non-violent gameplay, in addition to having a two-player mode that did not require modems or a network.

AllGame editor Lisa Karen Savignano described Glider 4.0 as "an interesting and fun game that will challenge people of all ages".

== Legacy ==
Two monthly ezines, GliderTech and The Cockpit, were published between 1995 and 1997 following the release of Glider PRO. GliderTech published editorials, house reviews, house building tips and each issue was accompanied by a house or two with some examples of obstacles or techniques that could be used in house creation.

On 20 June 2014, a version of Glider for OS X 10.7 or later, was released on the Mac App Store. This version is also available for the iPhone and iPad as Glider Classic. Both are from Soft Dorothy LLC.

On 27 Jan 2016, the source code, graphics, and sound data for Glider PRO were released on GitHub with the source code being licensed under the GNU General Public License v2. In addition, the source code for Glider 4.0 was released under the MIT License.

In 2020, a fan created a browser-based version of Glider 4.0 based on John Calhoun's Pascal source code.

In 2026, Calhoun released a new version of Glider that work with high-density displays, the app's first new version in 11 years.
