= Patrick Buckland =

British computer programmer

- Born: 1963 (age 62–63); Blackheath Hospital, London
- Occupations: Video game programmer; designer
- Known for: Crystal Quest; Carmageddon; Duels of the Planeswalkers

Patrick Buckland is a British video game programmer, designer and chief executive officer of Stainless Games, which he co-founded with Neil Barnden in 1994.

== Career ==
In 1985 Buckland developed a Macintosh game, the shareware title Crystal Raider which he followed with Crystal Quest.

In 1993 Barnden and Buckland started up Stainless Software.

In 2013, Buckland was one of a consortium of British individuals who bought the rights back to the sports car manufacturer TVR, from Nikolay Smolensky.

== Personal life ==
He was born in London and moved to the Isle of Wight at the age of 2, where he lives on the Isle of Wight with his wife and two children. He is a direct descendant of geologist/palaeontologist William Buckland and his son, zoologist Frank Buckland.

Buckland's father, John Buckland, was a composer and the protege of Ralph Vaughan Williams.
