= List of 4Kids Entertainment licenses and productions =

4Kids Entertainment, and its predecessor company (Leisure Concepts) and successor company (4Licensing Corporation), along with their subsidiaries, have licensed, developed, and distributed a wide variety of media products, ranging from video games and television programs to toy lines.

== Former TV productions ==
The following TV programs have ended or expired, but were handled by 4Kids Entertainment's 4Kids Productions subsidiary during their run on 4Kids TV and Toonzai, as well as other TV networks. This does not include any third-party programmes that aired on 4Kids TV or Toonzai that 4Kids did not hold any licensing rights to. All anime is in bold.

Title	Year(s)	Network	Production companies	Notes
WMAC Masters	1995–1996	Syndication	4Kids Productions; Renaissance Alliance Entertainment	Live-action original series, currently unlicensed
**Pokémon**	1998–2006	Syndication (1998); The WB (Kids' WB) (1999–2006)	TV Tokyo; MediaNet; Shogakukan Production; OLM	License expired on 31 December 2005, dubbed eight seasons and 416 episodes. Dubbing and licensing taken over by Pokémon USA, Inc./The Pokémon Company International beginning with Pokémon: Battle Frontier.
Cubix: Robots for Everyone	2001–2003	The WB (Kids' WB)	Cinepix; Daewon Media	Owned distribution and licensing rights outside South Korea, sold to Saban Brands in April 2012 as part of the company's bankruptcy sale. Currently owned by Hasbro Entertainment.
**Tama and Friends**	2001–2002	Syndication	Group TAC; Sony Creative Products; Aniplex	License expired in 2007, sub version currently streaming on Crunchyroll under Sony Creative Products.
**Yu-Gi-Oh!**	2001–2006	The WB (Kids' WB)	TV Tokyo; Nihon Ad Systems; Gallop	Held non-Asian distribution and licensing rights, sold to Konami during the 4Kids bankruptcy sale in 2012 and currently licensed under Konami Cross Media NY.
Ultraman Tiga	2002–2003	Fox (FoxBox)	Tsuburaya Productions	Production ceased after 26 episodes, and 4Kids instead licensed the original Japanese episodes on home media. License expired in 2008; currently held by the original owners, Tsuburaya Productions.
**Kirby: Right Back at Ya!**	2002–2006	Fox (FoxBox/4Kids TV)	Warpstar, Inc. Studio Sign; Studio Comet	License expired in 2009, currently held by HAL Laboratory
**Ultimate Muscle: The Kinnikuman Legacy**	2002–2004	Fox (FoxBox/4Kids TV)	TV Tokyo; Yomiko Advertising; Toei Animation	License expired in 2008; currently licensed by Discotek Media from the original licensor Toei Animation.
**Fighting Foodons**	2002–2003	Fox (FoxBox)	Group TAC & Kodansha	Sub-licensed from Enoki Films USA and dubbed by them. Also, formerly sub-licensed to Discotek Media.
Teenage Mutant Ninja Turtles	2003–2009	Fox (FoxBox/4Kids TV); The CW (The CW4Kids)	4Kids Productions; Mirage Studios	Rights transferred over to Nickelodeon in 2009 following their purchase of the Teenage Mutant Ninja Turtles franchise.
The Cramp Twins	2003–2006	Fox (FoxBox); Cartoon Network	Sunbow Entertainment; TV-Loonland AG	US licensing, distribution, and home media rights only. Rights currently owned by Studio 100
**Sonic X**	2003–2006	Fox (FoxBox/4Kids TV)	TV Tokyo; TMS Entertainment	US licensing, distribution, and home media rights only; held by TMS Entertainment in Asia and Jetix Europe in all other territories. Rights sold to Saban Brands in April 2012 as part of the company's bankruptcy sale; currently held in-house by TMS Entertainment and licensed out to Discotek Media.
Funky Cops	2003–2004	Fox (FoxBox/4Kids TV)	MoonScoop Group	US licensing, distribution, and home media rights only, production ceased after 26 episodes. Currently owned by Mediatoon.
**Shaman King**	2003–2005	Fox (FoxBox/4Kids TV)	TV Tokyo; NAS; Nihon Ad Systems; Shueisha; Xebec	US licensing, distribution, and home media rights only; held by TV Tokyo MediaNet in Asia and Jetix Europe in all other territories. Rights expired in 2010, currently licensed by Discotek Media under the original licensor ADK.
Winx Club	2004–2007	Fox (FoxBox/4Kids TV)	Rainbow S.p.A. RAI	English licensing, distribution, and home media rights only. License revoked by Rainbow in 2009, dubbed 3 seasons and 78 episodes. Franchise owned by Rainbow S.p.A.
The Incredible Crash Dummies	2004	Fox (FoxBox/4Kids TV)	4Kids Productions	Short-form series, currently unlicensed.
**F-Zero GP: Legend**	2004–2005	Fox (FoxBox/4Kids TV)	TV Tokyo; Dentsu; Ashi Productions	Production ceased after twenty-six episodes, currently unlicensed.
**One Piece**	2004–2007	Fox (FoxBox/4Kids TV); Cartoon Network	Toei Animation; Fuji TV	Production ceased after 104 episodes, and rights expired at the end of 2006. Currently held by Crunchyroll under original licensor Toei Animation.
**Mew Mew Power**	2005–2006	Fox (4Kids TV)	Kodansha; Pierrot	Production ceased after 26 episodes. rights expired in 2010. Currently unlicensed under the original licensor, Kodansha.
**Magical DoReMi**	2005–2008	Fox (4Kids TV)	Toei Animation; ABC Animation; ADK	Only licensed the first series, which was split into two seasons. The rights later expired and reverted to Toei Animation.
G.I. Joe: Sigma 6	2005–2006	Fox (4Kids TV)	Gonzo; 4Kids Productions; Hasbro	Distribution and dubbing rights only; all other rights held by Hasbro.
**Yu-Gi-Oh! GX**	2005–2008	Cartoon Network; Fox (4Kids TV)	TV Tokyo; Nihon Ad Systems; Gallop	Held non-Asian distribution and licensing rights, sold to Konami during the 4Kids bankruptcy sale in 2012 and currently licensed under Konami Cross Media NY.
**Pokémon Chronicles**	2006	Cartoon Network	TV Tokyo; MediaNet; Shogakukan Production	Premiered internationally in 2005 under 4Kids, US-run held under Pokémon USA, Inc.
Viva Piñata	2006–2008	Fox (4Kids TV)	Bardel Entertainment; 4Kids Productions; Microsoft	Held non-Canadian rights, rights currently owned by Microsoft.
**Yu-Gi-Oh! Capsule Monsters**	2006	Fox (4Kids TV)	TV Tokyo; Nihon Ad Systems; Gallop	Commissioned by 4Kids. Sold to Konami during the 4Kids bankruptcy sale in 2012 and currently licensed under Konami Cross Media NY.
Chaotic	2006–2010	Fox (4Kids TV); The CW (The CW4Kids)	4Kids Productions; Chaotic USA Entertainment Group	Rights currently owned by Epic Story Media.
**Dinosaur King**	2007–2010	Fox (4Kids TV); The CW (The CW4Kids)	Sunrise; Sega; ADK	Formerly licensed by Discotek Media under ADK.
**Yu-Gi-Oh! 5D's**	2008–2011	The CW (The CW4Kids)	TV Tokyo; Nihon Ad Systems; Gallop	Held non-Asian distribution and licensing rights, sold to Konami during the 4Kids bankruptcy sale in 2012 and currently licensed under Konami Cross Media NY.
GoGoRiki	2008–2009	The CW (The CW4Kids)	The Riki Group	Dubbing and international licensing only. Rights owned by The Riki Group.
Tai Chi Chasers	2011–2012	The CW (The CW4Kids)	JM Animation; Iconix Entertainment; Toei Animation	Production ceased after 2 seasons and 26 episodes. Currently unlicensed under the original licensor, Iconix Entertainment.
**Yu-Gi-Oh! Zexal**	2011–2012	The CW (The CW4Kids)	TV Tokyo; Nihon Ad Systems; Gallop	Held non-Asian distribution and licensing rights, sold to Konami during the 4Kids bankruptcy sale in 2012, who continued on with the rest of the series' run under Konami Cross Media NY.

== Other TV properties ==
- Buck Rogers in the 25th Century (Rights owned by NBCUniversal)
- The Amazing Chan and the Chan Clan (Rights owned by Warner Bros./Turner Entertainment Co.)
- ThunderCats (Rights owned by Warner Bros.)
- Dos y Dos (Rights owned by Latin America Multimedia)
- Meat or Die (Rights owned by Bonus Inc.)
- Rocket Monkeys (Rights owned by Corus)

== Non-television properties handled by 4Kids Entertainment (or worldwide licensed) ==
- The American Kennel Club
- Artlist Collection: The Dog and Friends
- Cabbage Patch Kids
- The Cat Fanciers' Association
- Charlie Chan (Company owned the trademark)
- Chicaloca
- Katsushika Hokusai
- Crufts
- Ellen's Acres
- Jim Henson Designs
- Kappa Mikey
- Karito Kids
- Kooky Klickers
- Max Adventures
- Monster Jam
- Pachanga
- Pajanimals
- WordWorld

== Past non-television properties handled by the company (or worldwide licensed) ==
- James Bond 007
- The Puttermans
- Polly Pocket
- Pillow people
- The Adventures of Pinocchio
- Santo Bugito
- Nintendo of America (Various characters, trademarks, and copyrights)
- Marvel Characters, Inc.(Europe only)
- The Shadow (licensed from Conde Nast)
- The Swan Princess (licensed from Nest Family Entertainment)
- Star Wars (licensed from Lucasfilm)
