= Dos y Dos =

Spanish and English educational TV series

Dos y Dos is a Spanish and English educational TV and DVD series for children ages two through seven, initially produced in San Diego in 2009.

== Show ==
Each show in the series is recorded in Spanish with several words and phrases spoken in English allowing children to be entertained in Spanish while learning elementary English. Each show features a live Latino cast singing, dancing, entertaining, and educating. In each show, Sofia, Fernando, Adriana, and Andres find five giant puzzle pieces, which when placed in a giant frame, reveal the topic or theme of the show for that day. Some of the themes for the show are shapes, colors, weather, and how to make the fastest paper airplane.

Along the way, "Dos y Dos" intends to teach fundamental core values like sharing, helping, and the importance of teamwork. Each show has music videos performed by the cast in Spanish. Foto Joe speaks English and travels the world taking pictures for children to see. When Foto Joe appears, kids learn from Foto Joe's photos and sing a song in English.

The Parents' Television Council gave the show their "green" traffic-light rating, approving the show for ages 3 and above.

== Cast ==
- Bayardo De Murguia plays the role of Andres. The final cast member to join Dos y Dos was signed on in October 2008. Bayardo brings a smooth, friendly singing voice.

Prior to joining "Dos y Dos", Bayardo studied theatre at the University of San Diego and took part in several shows at the Old Globe Theatres in San Diego, CA. Performances include A Midsummer Night's Dream, Julius Caesar, Othello, Titus Andronicus, and Kingdom - A Hip Hop Musical. Bayardo left Dos y Dos to continue working as an actor in Los Angeles, CA. His TV credits include a guest starring role as Agent Silva in CSI:Crime Scene Investigation, Marvel's Agents of S.H.I.E.L.D., and Matador for Robert Rodriguez' El Rey Network. He also works in both Spanish and English markets as a Voice-over artist.

- Ritchie Valenzuela plays the role of Fernando. Ritchie joined the cast of Dos y Dos in August 2008, after performing in the cast of "Los Jumpitz". Ritchie adds a strong dance background. An accomplished and award-winning singer, Ritchie has been performing on stage since he was a child.

Recent performance and choreography credits include Footloose, Fiddler on the Roof, Evita and Meet Me in St. Louis in addition to being a part of the Mojalet Dance Collective.
A graduate of The American Musical and Dramatic Academy in New York City, Ritchie regularly teaches for the San Diego Civic Dance Arts, the North Park Studio and spends summers teaching dance to children through a dance arts program.

- Karla Bautista plays the role of Sofia. Previously a member of the Spanish children's entertainment group, "Los Jumpitz", Karla brings experience entertaining toddlers and preschoolers to Dos y Dos.

Karla regularly lends her bilingual voice talents to a variety of kids products, most recently working on a series of educational games for children produced by LeapFrog.
Karla has a teaching degree from San Diego State University with a specialty in Social Sciences. Karla lives in Bonita, California where she teaches in the Sweetwater Union High School District.

- Blanca Buelna plays the role of "Adriana". Blanca brings more than 12 years of performance experience in stage and video to the cast of Dos y Dos. Recent credits include Grease, Dracula, and El Tigre y Los Encontrados. She also performed in the Latin American Youth Conference and was a winner at the Festival De La Cancion Latino Americana.

Blanca graduated with a bachelor's degree from San Diego State University in Youth Theater.
After Dos y Dos Blanca went on to continue her true passion working with youth and community development non-profits. In 2013 she earned a Master's of Science degree in Organizational Leadership.

- Joseph Dionisio plays the role of "Foto Joe." Joseph serves a dual role as cast member and Production Manager. On camera he is "Foto Joe", the English-speaking friend of Dos y Dos, and brings the element of English into the Spanish show. Joseph also belongs to the management team of Latin American Multimedia in the capacity of Production Manager.

As an actor, Joseph brings nearly 10 years of experience performing in video and on stage. Joseph was most recently a cast member of The Jumpitz children's DVD series. Stage credits include Twelfth Night, Hair, and My Fair Lady.
As a Production Manager, Joseph regularly oversees the entire stage operation of plays and musicals throughout San Diego. Joseph is also a graduate of UC San Diego.

== Production results ==
Dos y Dos Season 1 had 13 full episodes. Season 2 began February 20, 2010.

Dos y Dos has 104 original songs in both Spanish and English.

Dos y Dos has 39 music videos.

== International marketing ==
In the Fall of 2009, 4Kids International signed a worldwide licensing arrangement with Dos y Dos to handle its product sales. 4Kids International is also responsible for Pokémon, Teenage Mutant Ninja Turtles, and Cabbage Patch Kids.

Mexico City-based Rose Entertainment is the international television distributor for Dos y Dos.

As of April 2010, Dos y Dos aired in the U.S. on the Latin American Television Network nationwide every Saturday and Sunday morning.

== Latin American Multimedia Corporation ==
Latin American Multimedia Corporation
- Headquarters: San Diego, U.S.
- Area served: Latin America
- Key people: Joe Lizura 2008–2011; Everett Hernandez

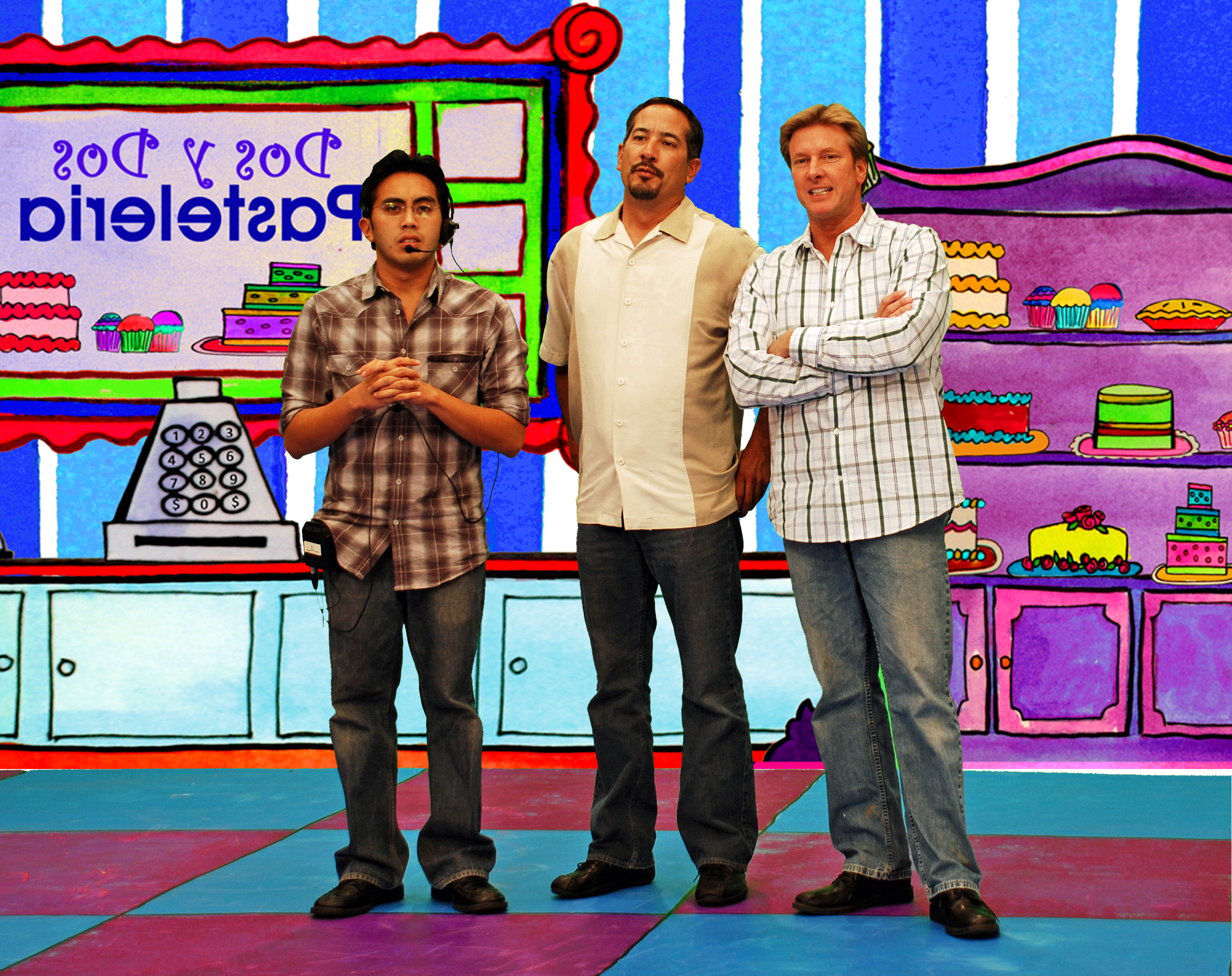
Joe Lizura on the set of Dos y Dos

Joe Lizura was the head of Latin American Multimedia Corporation from 2008 to 2011. Everett Hernandez is CEO as of 2013.
