= Katorea =

Katorea (Cattleya) is the name of several fictional characters:

- Cattleya in Zero no Tsukaima (The Familiar of Zero)
- Cattleya in Queen's Blade
- Cattleya in Rave Master
- Cattleya in Pokémon, whose English name is Caitlin
