= List of The Familiar of Zero characters =

This is a list of characters from the light novel, anime, and manga series The Familiar of Zero.

== Main characters ==
=== Louise ===
Voiced by: Rie Kugimiya (Japanese); Cristina Vee (English)

Louise Françoise Le Blanc de La Vallière (ルイズ・フランソワーズ・ル・ブラン・ド・ラ・ヴァリエール, Ruizu Furansowāzu Ru Buran do Ra Variēru) is a second-year student at the Tristain Academy of Magic. She is the third daughter of the Vallière family, an aristocratic family well known in the school. Louise is nicknamed "Louise the Zero" for her apparently-poor magic abilities, and masks her insecurity and hurt feelings with arrogance. She considers it her responsibility to ensure Princess Henrietta's safety and well-being. During a ceremony where all second-year students summon their peers, Louise summons Saito Hiraga (a human). She treats Saito as a slave at first, having him wash her clothes and sleep on a bed of straw. Louise is jealous when Saito interacts with other girls, and whips him with a riding crop or blows him up. As the series progresses, Louise falls in love with him. In the 14th light novel, Louise has Tiffania erase her memories of Saito so that she will not be corrupted. Saito restores Louise's memory by sharing his own with a kiss, after which she becomes tsundere.

During Albion's invasion of Tristain, Louise discovers that she is a rare Void Mage (descended from Brimir, the founder of Halkeginia 6,000 years ago), which explains her failure to perform other forms of magic. Her Void spell is "Explosion"; her powers can destroy armies, but takes time to cast. Louise sheds her status as an aristocrat to rescue her classmate, Tabitha, when she is taken prisoner by her uncle. After they return, the Queen of Tristain adopts Louise as a sister (placing Louise second in line to the throne). Louise becomes a priestess with Tiffa for the Pope's anniversary enthronement.

At the end of the fourth anime series Louise and Saito defeat the Ancient Dragon, affirm their love for each other, and are married. After the wedding, Louise uses her World Door spell to go to Japan with Saito and visit his parents.

Louise is named after Louise de La Vallière, a French noblewoman who was the mistress of Louis XIV from 1661 to 1667.^{[ LN 3]} In 2007, Rie Kugimiya was nominated for Best Actress in a Leading Role at the first Seiyu Awards for voicing Louise. She was the third-most-popular Rie Kugimiya character in an Anime! Anime! poll on Kugimiya's 39th birthday in 2018. Comic Book Resources called her the "Weakest Isekai Hero" and the worst tsundere character, saying that she "is much more than just a textbook example of a tsundere" and "she creates one of the slowest burning, most annoying build-ups to a relationship that ever had the misfortune of actually happening." Louise was fourth in Da Vinci News' "Top 7 Pink-Haired Anime Heroines" poll, with one respondent saying that they were infected with Kugimiya disease (釘宮病, Kugimiya-byō). Capsule Computers considered Louise unique; while "[m]ost characters held a reasonable degree of emotion when speaking, [...] Louise was definitely the stand out character from a vocal standpoint." Her character CD, released on 10 October 2007, was number 187 on the Oricon Singles Chart on 22 October of that year. Louise's Princesse no Rondo album, released on 3 September 2008, was number 141 on 15 September of that year. Her song album, Zero no Tsukaima Louise BEST, was released on 4 February 2009 and charted at number 58 on 16 February. Her F drama CD album with Henrietta was released on 21 March 2012.

=== Saito Hiraga ===
Saito

Voiced by: Satoshi Hino (Japanese); Jonathan Meza (English)

Saito Hiraga (平賀才人, Hiraga Saito) is a human summoned from Tokyo as Louise's familiar. Walking home on a busy Tokyo street, a portal opens in front of him. When he touches it, he finds himself in Harkeginia and meets Louise. Saito is bonded as Louise's familiar by a sealing kiss, which shocks him. Louise and Saito do not get along at first, and Louise treats him poorly. As the series progresses, they understand each other and fall in love. Whenever Saito pays attention to another girl, Louise punishes him with her riding crop or a blast from her void explosion spell.

When Louise becomes a familiar with Saito, the runes "" are inscribed on Saito's left hand. They signify his status as Gandálfr (神の左手・ガンダールヴ, Gandāruvu; "Gundolf" in Geneon anime, lit. "the Left Hand of God"), a familiar who can use any object crafted as a weapon by touching it;^{[S1 ep 10]}^{[S2 ep 12]} he can wield melee weapons and war machines which include a World War II A6M Zero fighter and a Tiger I, but not weapons crafted for ornamental purposes. A Gandálfr exists to protect a Void Mage as they cast their spells.^{[S1 ep 13]} After being mortally wounded from fighting Albion's army at the end of the second anime season, Saito is revived by Tiffania but loses his Gandálfr power ^{[S3 ep 1]} until Louise summons him and renews his contract.^{[S3 ep 2]} He is knighted by Henrietta and made vice-captain of the student Undine Knights, led by Guiche.^{[S3 ep 3]}

In the fourth anime season, after Saito becomes the lord of the De Ornielle region, Saito also becomes Tiffania's familiar and gains an ability known as Lífþrasir (神の心臓・リーヴスラシル, Līvusurashiru; lit. 'the Heart of God') which allows him to boost Void magic to the user he touches; his life force is drained each time he uses it. This ability was depleted after fighting the Ancient Dragon, according to Derflinger. When they fail to destroy the Ancient Dragon the first time, Louise sends Saito back to his world with the World Door. Saito returns through a solar eclipse with a F-2A jet fighter, and they destroy the Ancient Dragon.

Saito's weapon is a cheap sword Louise bought, which is the talking sword Derflinger (Derf) (Voiced by: Tetsuo Gotō (Japanese); Kaiji Tang (English)). Derflinger says that he was the partner of Gandálfr 6,000 years ago, and it is no coincidence that Saito and Derflinger are partners.^{[S1 ep 12]} Derflinger can absorb spells; apparently destroyed in Saito's first confrontation with the Ancient Dragon, he is dormant inside f Gandálfr. Saito is named after Gennai Hiraga (a Japanese scientist from the Edo period), and his name is written "ability man". At the end of the fourth anime series, Saito and Louise are married. Capsule Computers cited his sarcasm as his "most well performed moment", and called his power "interesting". His F drama CD album with Guiche and Julio was released on 21 March 2012.

== Tristain Academy of Magic ==
=== Students ===
==== Tabitha ====
Voiced by: Yuka Inokuchi (Japanese); Jennifer Alyx (English)

Tabitha (タバサ, Tabasa) is a quiet girl, a classmate of Louise, and Kirche's best friend. She enjoys reading, shows no emotion, says little about herself and often gives short, incomplete answers to questions. Her name is an alias; her real name is Charlotte Helene Orléans de Gallia (シャルロット, Sharurotto), daughter of the king's murdered brother and heiress to the throne of Gallia. Tabitha's mother was driven insane by a potent poison meant for her daughter. A doll given to Tabitha by her mother is named "Tabitha"; her mother sees the doll as her daughter, and her real daughter as an outsider who threatens to tear the family apart. Percerin, the family butler, says that her father's murder, her mother's madness, and harsh treatment by her usurping uncle made the previously lively, open Tabitha introverted.^{[S1 ep 8]}

Tabitha is a triangle mage who specializes in wind magic. She is a chevalier knight (the lowest rank), and develops feelings for Saito after he rescues her. Tabitha's familiar is Sylphid (also known as Illococoo), a nature dragon. During the fourth season, she receives a potion that restores her mother's sanity. Tabitha is proclaimed heir to the throne of Gallia, but postpones the coronation to live with Saito in De Ornielle with Louise and Siesta.

Her character CD, which she shares with Kirche, was released on 21 September 2006. Tabitha's Princesse no Rondo album was released on 24 September 2008, and charted at number 206 on 6 October. Her F drama CD album with Siesta was released on 21 March 2012.

==== Kirche ====
Voiced by: Nanako Inoue (Japanese); Lauren Landa (English)

Louise's classmate Kirche Augusta Frederica von Anhalt Zerbst (キュルケ, Kyuruke) is from a military family in Germania. She attends the academy, rather than a local school, because of her misbehavior. Kirche uses her attractiveness on men.^{[S1 ep 3]} Fire magic is her specialty, due to her passionate nature. Kirche enjoys making fun of Louise, because her family and the La Vallières are rivals. She is flirtatious and has dated many of the academy boys, but she is smitten with Saito; Louise punishes him for paying attention to Kirche. By the third series, her interest appears to be directed toward Colbert; she and Louise work together in critical situations. Kirche's familiar is a salamander named Flame, and her name means "church" in German. She falls in love with an older man, which is ironic because her refusal to marry one led to her enrollment in the academy. In the fourth anime series she and Montmorency spend more time together, and she is still fond of Saito.

Capsule Computers called Kirche's seduction her "most well-performed moment". Her character CD, which she shares with Tabitha, was released on 21 September 2006.

==== Guiche ====
Voiced by: Takahiro Sakurai (Japanese); Nicholas Manelick (English)

Guiche de Grammont (ギーシュ, Gīshu) is one of Louise's classmates who, despite being in love with Montmorency, is a playboy who often flirts with other women. He comes from a noble family with a deep military history; his father is a general. Guiche's wand is in the form of a long-stemmed rose, and he specializes in Earth magic and summoning Valkyries. He dotes on his familiar, a giant mole named Verdandi.

When Saito exposes Guiche's two-timing, Guiche challenges him to a duel which he loses when the runes on Saito's hand activate.^{[S1 ep 2]} Guiche becomes self-conscious and timid during conflicts, but still tries to help his classmates.^{[S1 ep 13]} He and the academy boys enlist in the army for the Albion War. Guiche's company is the first one in the city of South Gotha, where he is wounded in battle and revived by a fairy named Tiffania.^{[S2 ep 11]} In the third season of the anime, Guiche becomes captain of the student Undine Knights and appoints Saito his vice-captain.^{[S3 ep 3]}

His character CD (shared with Montmorency) was released on 6 September 2006. Guiche's F drama CD album with Julio and Saito was released on 21 March 2012.

==== Montmorency ====
Voiced by: Mikako Takahashi

Montmorency Margarita la Fère de Montmorency (モンモランシー・マルガリタ・ラ・フェール・ド・モンモランシ, Monmoranshī Marugarita ra Fēru do Monmoranshī) is Louise's classmate. Like most Tristain nobles she is proud, and made a contract with a Water Spirit. Montmorency has feelings for Guiche, and is jealous when he flirts with other girls. In the first anime season, she creates a love potion; Louise accidentally drinks it, and falls for Saito.^{[S1 ep 8]} Montmorency is one of the few female characters not competing for Saito's affection. Her familiar is a frog named Robin; her specialty is water magic, summoning the Water Spirit that has helped her family.^{[S1 ep 9]} Montmorency begins being included in the missions and spending more time with the main characters. She and Kirche grow closer, spending more time together after Tabitha leaves to rule her kingdom. Montmorency's character CD (shared with Guiche) was released on 6 September 2006.

==== Beatrice ====
Voiced by: Ayumi Tsuji

Beatrice Yvonne von Guldenhorf (ベアトリス, Beatorisu) is a student who is introduced in the third anime season as princess of a small, powerful country.^{[S3 ep 4]} She initially uses her position to bully Tiffania, and Guiche warns Saito not to confront her.^{[S3 ep 4]} After learning that Tiffania is a half-elf, Beatrice captures her and conducts a "heresy trial" for Tiffania to prove her loyalty to the humans' deity.^{[S3 ep 4]} When Louise says that Beatrice was lied about having the religious authority to conduct such a trial, the other students turn on Beatrice and give Tiffania the right to choose Beatrice's punishment; Tiffania forgives Beatrice, and asks her to be friends.^{[S3 ep 4]}

==== Malicorne ====
Voiced by: Hikaru Tokita

Malicorne de Grandple (マリコルヌ, Marikorunu) is a student at the Academy of Magic by Tristain, part of the Undine Knights under Guiche. Malicorne's familiar is an owl named Cubasil, and he has a vision spell that lets him see at least 15 miles. He has a crush on Tabitha's familiar, Illococo, before learning that she is a dragon in a human form.

==== Tiffania ====
Voiced by: Mamiko Noto

Tiffania Westwood (ティファニア・ウエストウッド, Tifania Uesutouddo; also "Tiffa") is a half-elf who first appears in the third anime season. Saito remembers her as "the big-breasted fairy who restored his life" during the war between Tristain and Albion.^{[S2 ep 12]} Tiffania's parents are the Archduke of Albion and an elf who is his mistress; she and Henrietta are cousins, since her father is Henrietta's uncle.^{[S3 ep 3]} Tiffania's magic comes from a ring her late mother left her, but when she revives Saito its gemstone is consumed.^{[S3 ep 3]} She later discovers she is a Void Mage, sought out by Sheffield and Joseph, with a Mindwipe spell that erases people's short-term memories and magical compulsions. Her familiar is Saito (who has two masters), and her confused feelings for him are realized during the fourth season. After her royal Albion heritage is recognized by Henrietta, Tiffania moves to the academy. She is ostracized at first due to her elvish origin, but was later accepted with Saito's help.^{[S3 ep 4]} Her beauty and kindness are admired by many of her classmates, and (like other women close to Saito) Louise is jealous of her.^{[S3 ep 4]}

Tiffania is naive for her age. Unlike Saito's promise to Louise (made because he loves her), his promise to Tiffania that "I will protect you" is in gratitude for resurrecting him. Her Princesse no Rondo album was released on 3 September 2008, and charted at number 160 on the Oricon Albums Chart on 15 September of that year. Her F drama CD album with Luctiana was released on 21 March 2012.

==== Reynald ====
Voiced by: Masahiro Yamanaka

Reynald (レイナール, Reināru) is a bespectacled student who is introduced in the third anime season as one of the Undine Knights under Guiche. Clever, he is friends with fellow students^{[S3 ep 4]} such as Gimili (also a member of the Undine Knights).

=== Plebeians ===
==== Siesta ====
Voiced by: Yui Horie (Japanese); Xanthe Huynh (English)

Siesta (シエスタ, Shiesuta) is a maid at the academy who loves Saito and treats him kindly. She seems to know how poorly Louise treats him, and is sure she would make him much happier than she does. The eldest of eight children, Siesta is from Tarbes ("Talb" in Geneon anime). Near the end of the first season, she learns that her great-grandfather Takeo Sasaki was a Japanese naval ensign during World War II who piloted a Mitsubishi A6M Zero fighter into Halkeginia and did not return; this explains why her hair and eyes resemble Saito's.^{[S1 ep 12]} During the second anime season, Siesta becomes determined to win Saito's heart despite his love for Louise^{[S2 ep 4]} and kisses him.^{[s2 ep 11]} After Saito is knighted, Henrietta orders her to be his personal maid.^{[S3 ep 3]}

Siesta's CD was released on 21 September 2006 and charted at number 213 on the Oricon Singles Chart on 2 October of that year. Her solo character CD, released on 24 October 2007, charted at number 229 on the Oricon Singles Chart on 5 November. Siesta's Princesse no Rondo album was released on 24 September 2008, and charted at number 161 on 6 October. Her F drama CD album with Tabitha was released on 21 March 2012.

==== Scarron ====
Voiced by: Tetsuo Gotō

Scarron (スカロン, Sukaron) runs the Miwaku no Yousei pub, similar to a maid cafe with its waitresses in colorful, revealing uniforms. Muscular, he behaves effeminately and asks his workers to call him as "ma madamoiselle". He is the father of Jessica,^{[S1 ep 7]} and is later revealed as Siesta's uncle.^{[S2 ep 11]}

==== Jessica ====
Voiced by: Akari Higuchi (Japanese); Michelle Ann Dunphy (English)

Jessica (ジェシカ, Jeshika), Scarron's daughter, is popular at their pub. She is Siesta's first cousin on her mother's side and, like Siesta, she is fond of Saito and tries to attract him.^{[S1 ep 7]}

=== Staff ===
==== Osmond ====
Voiced by: Takeshi Aono (Season 1-3), Bin Shimada (Season 4) (Japanese); Jonathan Meza (English)

Osmond (オスマン, Osuman) is the elderly, white-haired headmaster of the Tristain Academy of Magic. Initially serious, he is a voyeur.^{[S1 ep 5]} Henrietta finds Osmond trustworthy. Thirty years before the series begins, he fought a dragon and was saved by a man from another world (an American soldier from the Vietnam War) who used a M72 LAW rocket launcher that Osmond called the Staff of Destruction.^{[S1 ep 6]}

==== Jean Colbert ====
Voiced by: Takuma Suzuki (Japanese); Kaiji Tang (English)

Jean Colbert (コルベール, Korubēru) is a professor at the academy who is interested in history; his element specialty is fire magic. His interest in the technology of Saito's world helps him create "dragon's blood" (gasoline) to fuel an airplane.^{[S1 ep 13]} Colbert, captain of the magic troops sent to burn Agnès' village (D'Angleterre) 20 years earlier, rescues her when he learns that the village is not "plagued" and devotes himself to atonement. Anti-war, he is envious when he learns that present-day Japan is not ravaged by war. Colbert reveals himself as the Flame Snake when Albion sends mercenaries to attack Tristain Academy, and sacrifices himself to protect Agnès.^{[S2 ep 9]} In the third season, Colbert returns with Kirche to the academy;^{[S3 ep 7]} he had Tabitha fake his death, and stayed with Kirche's family.^{[S3 ep 8]} He builds a large airship, the Ostland, based on Saito's Zero Fighter.^{[S3 ep 8]}

==== Chevreuse ====
Voiced by: Noriko Suzuki

Chevreuse (シュヴルーズ, Shuvurūzu) is a new professor at the academy. Nicknamed the Red Earth Chevreuse, she specializes in earth magic.

==== Fouquet ====
Osmond's bespectacled secretary, with dark green hair, she is introduced as Longueville (ロングビル, Rongubiru). Normally calm and friendly, she becomes angry and violent when Osmond is lustful with her.^{[S1 ep 5]} Fouquet can use magic as a member of a noble family who lost their rank. In season one she is Fouquet the Sculptor, who summons a giant golem to steal the Staff of Destruction and stages a fight for it between the golem and Louise and her classmates. After seeing Saito fire it, Fouquet tries to fire it at him but there was only one projectile.^{[S1 ep 6]} Fouquet is arrested, but escapes; she joins Reconquista and assists Cromwell and Wardes, who calls her Matilda of Sachsen-Gotha. Although Kirche and the students call her an old woman, Fouquet says that she is only 23.^{[S1 ep 11]}

== Other characters ==
=== Tristain ===
==== Henrietta ====
Voiced by: Ayako Kawasumi

Henrietta de Tristain (アンリエッタ, Anrietta) is the princess of Tristain, and her element is water magic. She is a childhood friend of Louise. Henrietta defends Tristain from the Albion invasion after the assassination of her lover, Prince Wales. She is crowned queen in season two, and must deal with an impending war against Albion. In the manga, Louise delivers Wales' letter; Henrietta renounces her marriage, unable to ignore the crisis in Tristain.

She seems to be friendly with Saito, and envies Louise's bravery. Henrietta makes Saito her bodyguard in season two to counteract a spy.^{[S2 ep 6]} In season three, Louise considers her a romantic rival. Henrietta disguises herself as Louise at the Slepnir Ball, receiving a hug and kiss from Saito.^{[S3 ep 7]} She tells Louise that she does not know whether she is rebounding from Wales or falling for Saito. Henrietta acknowledges the latter in season four, which Louise grudgingly accepts. Her feelings for Saito are clearer in the light novels.

Henrietta's character CD, which she shares with Siesta, was released on 21 September 2006 and charted at number 213 on the Oricon Singles Chart on 2 October. Her solo character CD, released on 10 October 2007, charted at number 240 on the chart on 22 October. Her F drama CD album, with Louise, was released on 21 March 2012.

==== Agnès ====
Voiced by: Michiko Neya

Agnès Chevalier de Milan (アニエス, Aniesu) is introduced in the second anime season as captain of the Tristain musketeers in Henrietta's service.^{[S2 ep 1]} She hates mages, especially fire-element ones.^{[S2 ep 3]} Agnès is loyal to Henrietta, who calls her one of the few people she can trust.^{[S2 ep 1]} Originally suspicious of Saito,^{[S2 ep 1]} she comes to accept him as an ally and mourns his supposed death at the end of season two.^{[S2 ep 12]} Agnès joins Tristain's army to avenge the death of her parents, who died when her village was razed.^{[S2 ep 6]} Agnès kills Lishman, a politician who tricked the government into burning the village,^{[S2 ep 6]} and fights the former vice-captain of the army when he holds the academy girls hostage.^{[S2 ep 8]} She learns that Colbert is the Flame Snake who saved her life after seeing a burn scar on his back.^{[S2 ep 9]}

==== Eleonore and Cattleya ====
Voiced by: Kikuko Inoue (Eleonore) and Kotomi Yamakawa (Cattleya)

Eléonore Albertine Le Blanc De La Blois De La Vallière (エレオノール, Ereonōru) and Cattelya Yvette La Baume Le Blanc de La Vallière (カトレア, Katorea) are Louise's older sisters. Eléonore is strict and strong-willed, and she looks down on commoners such as Saito. After her engagement was called off by her lover, she insists that Louise get married.^{[S2 ep 4]} She and Cattleya join the academy during the second anime season to watch over Louise.^{[S2 ep 4]}^{[S2 ep 5]} By the end of season four, Eléonore accepts Louise's feelings for Saito.

Cattleya is more easy-going and gentle than Eléonore.^{[S2 ep 4]} She uses Earth magic, and is often seen with small pets and other animals.^{[S2 ep 5]} Cattleya wants Louise's happiness more than anything, and is not jealous of Saito. The sisters' character CD, which they share with their younger sister Louise, was released on 24 October 2007.

==== Wardes ====
Voiced by: Tomoyuki Shimura

Wardes (ワルド, Warudo) is the captain of Tristain's Magic Guard, known as the Griffin Knights. He claims to be Louise's fiancé, since he befriended her as a young girl. Wardes escorts Louise to Albion, but misleads her into thinking Saito and her friends have left them. After Louise meets with Wales, Wardes insists on marrying her right away at Albion and stops her from delivering Wales's reply. After capturing her, he reveals that he is part of the Reconquista faction and a traitor. The novel and anime imply that he is aware of Louise's potential as a Void Mage, and is interested in her primarily for that reason. Wardes stands with a spellbound Louise at the wedding, which is interrupted when Saito barges in and frees Louise from the spell. Saito cuts Wardes' hand, but he escapes.^{[S1 ep 11]} In the novels, Saito and Wardes reach a stalemate; in the anime, Wardes is killed by Louise's Void Magic.^{[S1 ep 13]}

=== Gallia ===
==== Sheffield ====
Voiced by: Masako Katsuki

Sheffield (シェフィールド, Shefīrudo) is Cromwell's secretary in the Reconquista faction, but later kills Cromwell after he is captured by Tristain and takes possession of the Ring of Andavari.^{[S1 ep 13]}^{[S2 ep 1]} She poisons South Gotha's water supply so those who drink it will also revolt against Tristania and Queen Henrietta.^{[S2 ep 11]} In the third anime season Sheffield reveals that she is Mjöðvitnir (神の頭脳・ミョズニトニルン, Myozunitonirun; lit. the Brain of God), a familiar of a Void Mage.^{[S3 ep 1]} Her power allows her to use any magical artifact, and gives her insight into magic theory.^{[S3 ep 2]} She later reveals that her master is Joseph, the king of Gallia, who is searching for other Void mages.^{[S3 ep 3]}

==== Joseph ====
Voiced by: Jūrōta Kosugi

Joseph (ジョセフ, Josefu) is the former king of Gallia, Sheffield's master and Tabitha's uncle. He kills Tabitha's father, Charles, and is behind the potion that drives Tabitha's mother insane. Joseph is a Void Mage, with the ability to speed up his movements, and has the Founder's Music Box; he is heartless. He and Sheffield die from a detonated Firestone after he finally feels emotion.

==== Gensou siblings ====
The Gallia Knights, also known as the Elemental Siblings, are mercenaries who first appear in the fourth season. King Joseph has them steal the Founder's Round Mirror and give it to him. They are Damiem (ダミアン, Damian) Voiced by: Mutsumi Tamura, Bleu (ブルー, Burū) Voiced by: Yuichi Iguchi, Jack (ジャック, Jakku) Voiced by: Itaru Yamamoto, and Jeanette (ジャネット, Janetto) Voiced by: Natsumi Takamori. Bleu and Jeanette fight with Saito and capture Louise. Jack summons golems similar to Guiche's Valkyries.

=== Albion ===
==== Wales ====
Voiced by: Masahiro Yamanaka (Japanese); Jonathan Koontz (English)

Wales Tudor (ウェールズ, Wēruzu) is the prince of Albion and Henrietta's cousin. Three years ago Henrietta took a vow of love at Lake Longorian to always be with him, but Wales does not reciprocate; he promises to walk with her and not worry others.^{[S2 ep 2]} When Louise delivers Henrietta's letter, Wales tells her about the conspiring Reconquista faction. He presides over Wardes and Louise's wedding; after Saito interrupts the ceremony Wardes betrays him and kills Wales, devastating Henrietta.^{[S1 ep 11]} Wales later appears to be alive and takes Henrietta to the lake to renew their vows, but he is under the control of Sheffield and Cromwell (who give him a false life).^{[{{{2}}}]} Louise eventually stops him with high-powered dispel magic. Wales is freed from the ring's control; he asks Henrietta to change her promise so she can fall in love with someone else, and his false life ends.^{[S2 ep 2]}

==== Cromwell ====
Voiced by: Jirō Saitō

Cromwell (クロムウェル, Kuromuweru), the leader of Reconquista, is responsible for the Albion war; he orders Wardes to kill the prince of Albion, and uses the Ring of Andvari to control people.^{[S1 ep 13]} In the light novels, he is killed during Gallia's bombardment of his headquarters after Gallia reneges on the secret treaty. In the anime, he is defeated by Louise's classmates^{[S1 ep 13]} in the invasion of Tristain and imprisoned; during Henrietta's coronation he is killed in his cell by Sheffield, who has reclaimed the ring.^{[S2 ep 1]}

=== Romalia ===
==== Julio ====
Voiced by: Daisuke Hirakawa

Julio Chesaré (ジュリオ, Jurio) is a knight from the Holy Empire of Romalia who transfers to the Tristain Magic Academy.^{[S2 ep 3]} He has "moon eyes" (月目); his eyes are heterochromic (one red, one blue), like the moons of Halkeginia.^{[S2 ep 3]} Julio is sent by Romalia's pope as his support for Henrietta's expedition to Albion, now in political strife after the fall of the royal family and the death of the Reconquista leader.^{[S2 ep 3]} He is the familiar of the pope, also known as Vindálfr (神の右手・ヴィンダールヴ, Vindāruvu; lit. God's Right Hand), who can communicate with and command magical creatures like Saito can wield weapons.^{[S4 ep 1]} Julio's F drama CD album, with Guiche and Saito, was released on 21 March 2012.

==== Vittorio ====
Voiced by: Shinnosuke Tachibana

Vittorio Serevare (ヴィットーリオ, Vuittōrio), the pope of Romalia with the titles of St. Aegis the 32nd and Shield of the Founder, was crowned three years before Saito's summoning. He is introduced in season four of the anime, when Saito, Louise and Tiffania are invited to his cathedral. Only 20 years old, Vittorio is kind-hearted but must deal with the nobles. He is a Void user with disintegration magic (originally the spell of Recovery), which incinerates evil entities. Julio is his familiar.^{[S4 ep 1]}

=== Elves ===
==== Luctiana ====
Voiced by: Hisako Kanemoto

Luctiana (ルクシャナ, Rukushana) is interested in researching humans and their culture. Luctiana and Arie kidnap Tiffania and Saito because they are a Void mage and Gandláfr. She keeps them at a private oasis, where Saito finds a submerged fighter jet. The elves at the council try to have Tiffania and Saito terminated, but Luctiana and Bidashal oppose that and help them escape underground. She and Arie join them later with Louise and the others on the Ostland to see more of the human world. Her F drama CD album, with Tiffania, was released on 21 March 2012.

=== Familiars ===
==== Sylphid ====
Voiced by: Satomi Arai (Sylphid) / Yuka Iguchi (Illococoo)

Sylphid (シルフィード, Shirufīdo; Geneon anime: Sylpheed) is a rare female Rhyme Dragon and Tabitha's familiar. Too large to live in the academy like the other familiars, she lives in a neighboring forest. When Tabitha is captured during the third season, Sylphid escapes and notifies Louise and her friends by assuming the form of a blue-haired girl named Illococoo (イルククゥ, Irukukũ) who claims to be Tabitha's little sister. She is not embarrassed when she first appears in the academy courtyard naked in front of Saito and the others because, as a dragon, she is naked all the time. Illococoo promises her "older sister" that she will not tell anyone about her ability to use shape-shifting magic, but Derflinger is aware of her true nature and tells the others.^{[S3 ep 9]}

== Works cited ==
=== The Familiar of Zero anime ===
==== Season 1 ====
- Episode 1: "Louise the Zero"
- Episode 2: "Commoner Familiar"
- Episode 3: "Feverish Tempation"
- Episode 5: "Tristein's Princess"
- Episode 6: "A Thief's Identity"
- Episode 7: "Louise's Part-Time Job"
- Episode 8: "Tabitha's Secret"
- Episode 9: "Louise's Change of Heart"
- Episode 10: "A Princess' Request"
- Episode 11: "Louise's Marriage"
- Episode 12: "Zero Treasure"
- Episode 13: "Louise the Void"

==== Season 2: Futatsuki no Kishi ====
- Episode 1: "Her Majesty, the Queen's Zero"
- Episode 2: "The Oath of Wind and Water"
- Episode 3: "The Paladin's Sword"
- Episode 4: "The Three Vallière Sisters"
- Episode 5: "The Spy's Seal"
- Episode 6: "The Queen's Vacation"
- Episode 7: "The Underground Secret Document"
- Episode 8: "The Magic Institute's Crisis"
- Episode 9: "The Atonement of Flames"
- Episode 10: "The Enemy on Snowy Alps"
- Episode 11: "The Silver Pentecost"
- Episode 12: "The Farewell Wedding Ceremony"

==== Season 3: Princesse no Rondo ====
- Episode 1: "The Familiar's Mark"
- Episode 2: "The Elf of the Forest"
- Episode 3: "The Return of the Hero"
- Episode 4: "The Rumored Accepted Student"
- Episode 5: "The Alluring Women's Bath"
- Episode 6: "Forbidden Magic Drug"
- Episode 7: "Slepnir Ball"
- Episode 8: "The Eastern Pursuit!"
- Episode 9: "Tabitha's Younger Sister"
- Episode 10: "Border Mountain Pass"
- Episode 11: "Captive in Al Hambra"
- Episode 12: "Wings of Freedom"
- OVA 6.5: "Seductive Beach"

==== Season 4: The Familiar of Zero F ====
- Episode 1: "Louise of the Holy Ground"
- Episode 2: "Aquileia's Shrine Maiden"
- Episode 3: "The Incompetent King Gone Mad"
- Episode 4: "The Queen's Reward"
- Episode 5: "The Maidens of De Ornielle"
- Episode 6: "Trouble at the Outdoor Bath"
- Episode 7: "Elves from the Desert"
- Episode 8: "Escape Through the Sewer"
- Episode 9: "Tabitha's Coronation"
- Episode 10: "The Awakening of Calamity"
- Episode 11: "Louise's Choice"
- Episode 12: "The Familiar of Zero"

=== Light novels ===
- Vol. 1: Yamaguchi, Noboru (June 2004). The Familiar of Zero (ゼロの使い魔, Zero no Tsukaima) (in Japanese). illustrated by Eiji Usatsuka. Media Factory.
- Vol. 2: Yamaguchi, Noboru (September 2004). The Familiar of Zero 2: Wind of Albion (ゼロの使い魔2 風のアルビオン, Zero no Tsukaima 2: Kaze no Arubion) (in Japanese). illustrated by Eiji Usatsuka. Media Factory.
- Vol. 3: Yamaguchi, Noboru (December 2004). The Familiar of Zero 3: Founder of the Prayer Book (ゼロの使い魔3 始祖の祈祷書, Zero no Tsukaima 3: Shiso no Kitō-sho) (in Japanese). illustrated by Eiji Usatsuka. Media Factory.
