= List of The Familiar of Zero episodes =

Zero no Tsukaima Japanese DVD volume 1 cover

The Japanese anime series The Familiar of Zero consists of four seasons, and the story follows characters from the second-year class of a magic academy, with the main one being an inept mage Louise and her familiar, a human from Earth, Saito Hiraga.

The first season, released in 2006, entitled The Familiar of Zero (ゼロの使い魔, Zero no Tsukaima), was produced by the Japanese animation studio J.C.Staff and directed by Yoshiaki Iwasaki. The series contained thirteen episodes which aired between July 3 and September 25 on a number of Japanese television networks, which include, but are not limited to Chiba TV and TV Kanagawa. In 2007, the second season, entitled The Familiar of Zero: Knight of the Twin Moons (ゼロの使い魔 〜双月の騎士〜, Zero no Tsukaima: Futatsuki no Kishi), had Yuu Kou as director. The series contained twelve episodes and aired in Japan between July 9 and September 24 on several Japanese television networks, such as Sun TV, TV Aichi, and TV Saitama. In 2008, the third season, titled The Familiar of Zero: Rondo of Princesses (ゼロの使い魔 〜三美姫(プリンセッセ)の輪舞(ロンド), Zero no Tsukaima: Princesse no Rondo) was produced by the same team as the previous season; the series began July 6, 2008, and ended on September 21, 2008. Like the second season, it contained twelve episodes. A fourth and final season titled The Familiar of Zero F (ゼロの使い魔, Zero no Tsukaima F) aired between January 7, 2012, and March 24, 2012. It also contained twelve episodes.

Each season has two pieces of theme music: an opening theme and a closing theme. All opening themes are performed by Ichiko while all closing themes are performed by Rie Kugimiya, Louise's Japanese voice actress. Season one's episodes opened with "First Kiss" and ended with "The real feeling" (ホントノキモチ). Season two episodes started with "I Say Yes" and ended with "Suki!? Kirai!? Suki!!!" (スキ!? キライ!? スキ!!!), and season three episodes started with "You're the One" and ended with "Gomen" (literally "Sorry"). Season four episodes started with "I'll Be There For You" and ended with "Kiss Shite Agenai"

All four seasons of the series have been released on DVD in Japan.

In April 2007 at Anime Boston, Geneon announced that they had picked up the English dubbing rights of the first season of the anime series under the title The Familiar of Zero. In July 2008, Geneon Entertainment and Funimation Entertainment announced an agreement to distribute select titles in North America. While Geneon Entertainment still retained the license, Funimation Entertainment assumed exclusive rights to the manufacturing, marketing, sales and distribution of select titles. The Familiar of Zero was one of several titles involved in the deal. Funimation released a complete box set of the series on November 4, 2008. Funimation reported their rights to the series expired in August 2011. Sentai Filmworks re-licensed the first series in North America in 2013 and released it digitally. Sentai released the Geneon English-language version on Blu-ray and DVD on April 8, 2014.

Sentai Filmworks licensed the second season (under the name The Familiar of Zero: Knight of the Twin Moons) in North America and released it on March 10, 2015, on Blu-ray and DVD. Sentai Filmworks licensed the third season with the OVA (under the name The Familiar of Zero: Rondo of Princesses) in North America and released them on May 12, 2015, on Blu-ray and DVD. In 2012, Sentai Filmworks licensed the fourth season (under the name The Familiar of Zero: F) in North America and released it on July 14, 2015, on Blu-ray and DVD.

== Series overview ==
Season	Episodes	Originally released	
Season	Episodes	First released	Last released
1	13	July 3, 2006	September 25, 2006
2	12	July 9, 2007	September 27, 2007
3	12	July 6, 2008	September 21, 2008
4	12	January 7, 2012	March 24, 2012

== The Familiar of Zero (2006) ==
No. overall	No. in series	Title	Original release date
1	1	"Louise the Zero"; Transliteration: "Zero no Ruizu" (Japanese: ゼロのルイズ)	July 3, 2006
In a magical world called Halkeginia at the Tristain Academy for magicians, Louise de La Vallière heads to class on her first day as a second-year student. Her teacher asks her to perform a simple spell: to change pebbles into brass, though her peers mock her with the nickname "Zero". As soon as she casts the spell, the room explodes. Despite being from a famous magician family, Louise has a "Zero" percent success rate casting spells. On the day of the familiar summoning ceremony, Kirche summons a fire salamander; Guiche summons Verdandi, a large mole, but Louise summons a human being, Saito Hiraga, from Tokyo, Japan who cannot understand what Louise is saying. Louise is disappointed but cannot break the ritual's tradition, so she makes a contract with Saito by kissing him and runes appear on his left hand. Louise tries to shut him up by performing a silence spell which backfires and allows Saito to speak and understand Louise's language. Saito thinks he has been kidnapped until he sees the two moons in the sky and realizes he is in another world.
2	2	"Commoner Familiar"; Transliteration: "Heimin no Tsukaima" (Japanese: 平民の使い魔)	July 10, 2006
Saito must now deal with being Louise's familiar and he is often whipped for being disobedient. In the morning, Saito dresses Louise before they go to breakfast where Saito only gets a piece of bread and meets a kind maid, Siesta. Unhappy with the arrogance of nobles, Saito mocks Guiche's two-timing nature so Guiche challenges him to a duel. Despite being severely beaten up by Guiche's summoned brass golem, Saito refuses to back down. Impressed, Guiche tosses him a sword to give him a chance. The runes etched on Saito's hand begin to glow the moment he touches the sword, enhancing his strength and speed and giving him sword skills, and he easily defeats Guiche. However, he soon collapses after the fight from fatigue. Mr. Colbert and the headmaster Osmond suspect Saito may be a legendary familiar.
3	3	"Feverish Temptation"; Transliteration: "Binetsu no Yūwaku" (Japanese: 微熱の誘惑)	July 17, 2006
With his victory over Guiche, Saito has become popular among commoners and several nobles. Siesta and the commoners, who now call him "Our Sword", secretly feed Saito as Louise is withholding food as his new punishment. He also learns why people call her "Zero". To add to his troubles Kirche, a noble from Germania, has chosen him as her next boyfriend. In a devious plan, she attempts to seduce him, although this fails when Louise finds out. After considering Saito's hidden talent with a sword, Louise drags him to town to buy him a sword. Kirche matches Louise's gift with a more impressive sword, which causes more conflict between Saito and Louise. Louise's sword later reveals itself to be the talking sword Derflinger.
4	4	"A Maid's Crisis"; Transliteration: "Meido no Kiki" (Japanese: メイドの危機)	July 24, 2006
Osmond continues his harassment of his secretary Longueville. Siesta is forced into the service of Count Mott to be his mistress. Disgusted by the lack of regard that nobles have for commoners, Saito tries his best to rescue her. They make a deal where Count Mott asks for a particular family heirloom book from a Germania family – coincidentally it is Kirche's family, which was summoned from another world. Saito asks Kirche for the book, but Kirche wants him to date her. After refusing her demand, Saito attempts to take on Count Mott with Kirche's expensive sword, but his runes do not activate as it is an ornamental sword not meant for combat and he struggles to lift it. Louise and the others arrive just in time to prevent Saito from being executed. Kirche agrees to give Count Mott the book in exchange for Siesta's freedom and forgiving Saito for his offense. Saito catches a glimpse of the heirloom book and is surprised to find that it is just an old porn magazine from Japan. After they return to the academy, Siesta kisses Saito on the cheek in thanks for his efforts.
5	5	"Tristein's Princess"; Transliteration: "Torisutein no Himegimi" (Japanese: トリステインの姫君)	July 31, 2006
The exhibition of new familiars is a day away, and Louise is feeling rather depressed about it. Not only does Saito have nothing impressive to show, but this year the Princess of Tristain will be present, which makes the event more important. As night approaches, desperation sets in as Saito is unable to produce an act worthy of praise. A visitor to Louise's room turns out to be Princess Henrietta herself, and she explains how she and Louise are childhood friends. The next day, Saito performs a weak sword-swinging demonstration only to be dragged off-stage by Louise. They witness Fouquet the Sculptor attempting to break into the school's treasure vault using an earth golem. Louise tries to stop her with her magic, but her blast misses the golem and hits the tower wall, breaching the magic barrier to the vault. Tabitha and her dragon familiar, Sylphid, fly in to help but are too late to prevent Fouquet from stealing the fabled Staff of Destruction and making her escape.
6	6	"A Thief's Identity"; Transliteration: "Tōzoku no Shōtai" (Japanese: 盗賊の正体)	August 7, 2006
Worried that the princess may be blamed for Fouquet's theft, Louise volunteers to go and catch her. Kirche and Tabitha volunteer as well. They travel to the place of Fouquet's last sighting escorted by Longueville. Kirche, Tabitha, and Saito enter an empty house where Tabitha discovers the hidden Staff of Destruction. Fouquet's golem appears outside. Louise tries to fight the golem with some spells but fails. As she is about to be crushed, Saito rushes in to save her. Her confidence broken, Louise breaks into tears. Saito is moved by this and attacks the golem himself as Sylphid rescues the nobles. He uses Kirche's sword but it breaks on contact with the golem. Derflinger calls on Saito to use him. Saito draws Derflinger and the runes on his hands glow again. He is able to slash the golem's legs, but they reform themselves. Louise tries to help using the Staff of Destruction, which Saito recognizes as a M72 rocket launcher, and with his rune-enabled abilities, he fires it at the golem and destroys it. In the aftermath, Longueville claims the staff and reveals herself to have been Fouquet all along; she engineered the scenario to discover how to use the staff. She tries to kill the students with the staff but nothing happens, as rocket launchers are single-use weapons. Saito knocks Fouquet out. Later, Osmond reveals that 30 years previously, he was fighting a monster when a man from another world (an American soldier from the Vietnam War) used one of two "staffs" to save his life. After the man died, Osmond buried the man and kept the remaining staff. The school later holds a ball to celebrate, where Louise asks Saito to dance with her and thanks him for saving her.
7	7	"Louise's Part-Time Job"; Transliteration: "Ruizu no Arubaito" (Japanese: ルイズのアルバイト)	August 14, 2006
Henrietta congratulates Louise for capturing Fouquet; she offers her hand to Saito, but Saito misunderstood and kisses her on the lips. Henrietta asks Louise and Saito to work undercover to determine if nobles are taking advantage of the commoners. Louise naively loses all of their money in a casino where she was hoping to increase their funds. Refusing to ask Henrietta for more money, Saito and Louise find work at a tavern called Charming Fairy Inn run by Scarron and his daughter, Jessica. Louise works as a waitress and Saito works as a dishwasher where he is in close contact with Jessica much to Louise's displeasure. Scarron holds a contest for the waitresses: whoever gets the most tips gets a large reward plus the chance to wear a special maid outfit. Louise is unable to earn any tips because of her temper until an arrogant noble enters the bar. After bringing him to justice, the noble runs off, but leaves a large bribe for Louise; the "tip" enables Louise to win the contest. Even though she and Saito now have to leave Louise wears the special maid outfit just for him.
8	8	"Tabitha's Secret"; Transliteration: "Tabasa no Himitsu" (Japanese: タバサの秘密)	August 21, 2006
It's summer vacation, and many students are traveling back to their families. Kirche goes along with Tabitha to her home. As a result, Louise and Saito are alone for once. Kirche learns that Tabitha's real name is Charlotte, Princess of Gallia and that she has a tragic past in which her mother drank a potion that drove her insane. Her reason for returning home is revealed to be a mission from her uncle, the King of Gallia. Meanwhile, Montmorency is upset that Guiche has been flirting with other girls, makes "Afrotiziac" (a kind of love potion), and tries to slip it into Guiche's drink. Saito finds a large cooking pot that was about to be thrown away and fashions it into a hot tub later at night, similar to those in Japan. While Saito relaxes in the tub, Siesta passes by and joins him, much to his embarrassment. Louise sees the two together and becomes so frustrated that she interrupts Guiche and Montmorency and accidentally consumes the drink with the love potion in it. When Saito returns to her room, Louise gets flustered and falls completely in love with him.
9	9	"Louise's Change of Heart"; Transliteration: "Ruizu no Henshin" (Japanese: ルイズの変心)	August 28, 2006
Louise continues her lovey-dovey behavior towards Saito, which freaks him out, as well as causes a misunderstanding with Siesta. In desperation, Saito demands that Montmorency create an antidote, but she refuses to help until he threatens to blackmail her into helping (Saito learned from Siesta that emotion-changing potions are illegal). Since the antidote requires "the tear of a water elemental", Montmorency and Guiche lead Saito and the love-struck Louise to Lagdorian Lake where they make contact with the Water Spirit who is flooding the land so that she can search for her stolen precious treasure but she is being hindered by magic users. Saito volunteers to deal with them and he and Guiche fight the intruders who turn out to be Kirche and Tabitha. Saito promises to find whatever the Water Spirit has lost. The spirit trusts his word as "Gandálfr", and gives him the antidote.
10	10	"A Princess' Request"; Transliteration: "Himegimi no Irai" (Japanese: 姫君の依頼)	September 4, 2006
Having taken care of the love potion, Louise and Saito receive a new mission. In order to strengthen her country's alliance, Princess Henrietta is to be wed to the Emperor of Germania. Louise and Saito must recover an indiscreet letter that Henrietta wrote to Prince Wales of Albion or the wedding will be canceled. The princess is unable to see the prince in person because Albion is in a state of civil war. Guiche overhears the conversation and volunteers to aid the princess and Henrietta accepts, much to Louise and Saito's surprise. Before leaving, Saito learns about Gandálfr and legendary Void magic from Colbert, as well as a story of two dragons. On the day of departure, their escort, Wardes, captain of the griffin squadron, arrives. It turns out he is also Louise's fiancé, and Saito grows jealous of him. Later, Derflinger talks to Saito about Gandálfr, and how only a Gandálfr can wield Derflinger. Wardes proposes to Louise then, at dinner, asks Saito to spar with him. Wardes wins easily and mocks Saito's promise to protect Louise, leaving Saito depressed.
11	11	"Louise's Marriage"; Transliteration: "Ruizu no Kekkon" (Japanese: ルイズの結婚)	September 11, 2006
That evening, Louise and Wardes board the ship after convincing her that the Guiche and Saito have returned home. He persists in his courtship and Louise accepts his proposal. In truth, the boys have been delayed by the sudden appearance of Fouquet and her golem. They are saved by Kirche and Tabitha who showed up on Sylphid. Saito figures out that Wardes and Fouquet were working together and Louise is in trouble. Wardes and Louise arrive in Albion, the floating continent, where they meet with Prince Wales. Louise delivers the letter, then Wales gives a reply letter to her that she is meant to retrieve and learns of the power behind the uprising of nobles in Albion, the Reconquista. Their mission supposedly completed, Wardes insists that they get married in Albion. He reveals himself as a member of the Reconquista and is a threat to Wales. Louise tries to refuse, but one of Wardes' allies, Cromwell, arrives with the Water Spirit's stolen ring and forces her to consent using mind-control. The marriage proceeds with Wales officiating and is nearly complete when Saito bursts into the church and snaps Louise out of her trance. The marriage ceremony is ruined, Wardes kills Wales, steals the letter from Louise, and tries to kill Saito. However, Wardes' treatment of Louise angers Saito and he is able to unlock his abilities as Gandálfr and fully utilize Derflinger. He defeats Wardes' magic who flees but not before bringing the church down on Louise and Saito. The two of them are rescued by Tabitha and the others, and Sylphid flies everyone home. Saito, holding Louise in his arms, kisses her.
12	12	"Zero Treasure"; Transliteration: "Zero no Hihō" (Japanese: ゼロの秘宝)	September 18, 2006
Louise informs Henrietta of Wales' death, and the princess' wedding is canceled. Louise also warns Osmond about the Reconquista. Osmond then tells her about Void magic and Gandálfr. After another argument with Louise, Saito accompanies Siesta to her home village of Talbes to find a dragon. Louise and others follow them and they locate the rare dragon, which Siesta's family has kept as an heirloom. Saito finds a tombstone with a Japanese epitaph on it. The dragon turns out to be an A6M Zero Fighter, a Japanese aircraft. It is revealed that Siesta's great-grandfather was an IJN pilot from World War II and that he was magically transported to Halkeginia just as Saito was. Colbert explains that two "dragons" had flown during a solar eclipse, but one disappeared. He suggests that the timing of the second pilot (Siesta's great-grandfather) was off and that the solar eclipse ended before the second pilot was able to fly through the portal. Saito concludes that the other pilot returned home, and this is his chance to return home as well. As they bring the plane back to school, Albion declares war on Tristain, wanting to use the country as a base from which they can conquer the rest of the continent and plan to launch their attack in three days during the next solar eclipse.
13	13	"Louise the Void"; Transliteration: "Kyomu no Ruizu" (Japanese: 虚無のルイズ)	September 25, 2006
Saito tells Louise that he wants to return home during the upcoming solar eclipse, and he gets angry when she acts as if she doesn't care. A war between Albion and Tristain is deemed inevitable. Henrietta assembles a military force that conscripts the boys from the academy. Louise walks in on a sleeping Saito whereupon she says goodbye. The next morning, Saito wakes to find a letter in which Louise has written, "You're fired! Just go wherever you want!" Louise decides to join the princess in the war. Saito gets in his Zero Fighter while Henrietta advances with the Tristain military to intercept the invading Albion force at the village of Talbes. Instead of flying straight into the eclipse, Saito attacks Albion's dragon squadrons, who are unable to keep up with the plane's speed. Saito runs out of bullets and is attacked by Wardes on a wind dragon. Louise jumps from Sylphid to Saito's plane. Tabitha, Kirche, and Guiche together break down Fouquet's golem, and Fouquet flees for good. At the thought of Saito being harmed, Louise finally makes a connection with Saito and unlocks her Void magic for the first time, casting a powerful spell known as 'Explosion' which destroys the entirety of Albion's aerial force, including Wardes. After the battle, with the solar eclipse past and the Zero Fighter nearly destroyed, Saito and Louise sit by the plane's wreckage where they have an argument once again and end up kissing. Elsewhere, Cromwell tries to hypnotize Kirche and Tabitha with the Ring of Andavari, but Guiche knocks him unconscious. Later, the four aristocrats are awarded medals by Henrietta, and Tabitha is given the Water Spirit's ring to fulfill the promise to return it. Louise is so excited about her medal that she rushes to show it to Saito only to find him chatting with Siesta. In a typical fashion, Louise overreacts and punishes Saito.

== The Familiar of Zero: Knight of the Twin Moons (2007) ==
No. overall	No. in series	Title	Original release date
14	1	"Her Majesty, the Queen's Zero"; Transliteration: "Joō-heika no Zero" (Japanese: 女王陛下のゼロ)	July 9, 2007
Saito is overjoyed to find himself back in Japan, having returned in the Zero Fighter. When he finds that Louise is not with him, Saito realizes that returning without her has no meaning anymore. The fighter crashes and Saito awakens to find that it was all a dream and he is still in Halkeginia. He hugs Louise, grateful for her presence which embarrasses her. She explains that she's grateful that he stayed behind for her sake, including letting him sleep in her bed. The next day, she gives Saito a pair of magical glasses whose gems blink whenever he so much as looks at another girl. She, of course, reacts in a typical fashion and punishes him for his indiscretions. Later that day while watching newly-crowned Queen Henrietta parade through the streets of the town, Saito's glasses start blinking after Louise inadvertently made him look, leading her to foolishly overreact in public & causing Saito's imprisonment as a suspected assassin. Louise attempts to clear the misunderstanding but is turned away by Agnès who leads the palace Musketeer Force. Henrietta meets with Saito in his cell, whose glasses are finally destroyed and states that Tristain needs his legendary familiar power. Cromwell has been killed in his cell and someone within Tristain is likely responsible (the perpetrator earlier revealed to have obtained the Ring of Andavari which Tabitha was to return to the Water Spirit). Henrietta then allows Louise to rush into his arms, relieved that Saito is unhurt. On returning home under escort, Agnès tells them that any future messages from the queen will be passed on using the codename "Zero". She then tells Saito that she will overlook his indiscretion. Back in their room, Louise insists Saito explain the misunderstanding that Agnès mentioned and returns to her previous treatment on him. The next morning, Agnès rushes in to find Louise holding a riders' crop and sitting astride a beaten and half-naked Saito. Embarrassed, she retreats momentarily then returns to inform them that Henrietta has been kidnapped.
15	2	"The Oath of Wind and Water"; Transliteration: "Kaze to Mizu no Chikai" (Japanese: 風と水の誓い)	July 16, 2007
The supposedly dead Wales appears and takes Henrietta to Albion. He uses his vow from their earlier days to convince her into following him. The Musketeer Force chases Wales, but he repulses them with his magic. Saito and Louise go to rescue Henrietta by using the Zero Fighter with Kirche and Tabitha following them. Everyone then confronts Wales at Lagdorian Lake as he combines Henrietta's magic with his. Henrietta refuses to leave Wales' side. Wales, later revealed to be revived and controlled by Cromwell's Ring of Andavari, is defeated by Louise with a Dispel spell. Wales is released from the control of the ring and asks Henrietta to make a new vow that she will move on and fall in love with someone else, before dying again.
16	3	"The Paladin's Sword"; Transliteration: "Seishokusha no Ken" (Japanese: 聖職者の剣)	July 23, 2007
When all the boys from the school leave for the upcoming war in Albion, Julio Chesaré, a knight and priest transfers to the school from Romalia, instantly becomes popular with the girls, and shows an interest in Louise. Agnès and her Musketeer Force burst into the school and force the girls out of Mr. Colbert's class to train in case of rebellion. Julio challenges Saito to a fight in which the winner gets to kiss Louise. Saito receives special training from Agnès, but Louise shows up and attacks Saito in a jealous rage yet again. He fights against Julio the next day with wooden swords, but Julio loses to him on purpose which angers Saito. Later, Henrietta tells them of the approaching war with Albion and their leader, Governor Sheffield.
17	4	"The Three Vallière Sisters"; Transliteration: "Variēru no Sanshimai" (Japanese: ヴァリエールの三姉妹)	July 30, 2007
Louise's eldest sister Eléonore drags her, Saito, and Siesta back to the Vallière mansion, where Louise is announced to be engaged to a duke. Louise tries to prove to her family that she isn't the "Zero" anymore but cannot reveal that she is a user of Void. Meanwhile, Louise looks for Saito, goes into his room, and kisses Siesta, whom she has mistaken for Saito. Saito goes to talk to her at night but instead finds Eléonore who beats him. The next day, when Louise's father forbids her from going into a war, she gets upset and flees to a children's boat. Louise's gentle and kind sister, Cattleya, convinces Saito to stay by Louise's side. Saito finds her and confesses his true feelings to Louise then makes out with her, fights his way out of the Vallière residence, and heads back to school with Louise. She doesn't believe him about what happened and beats him again while Siesta tells herself she is the only one for Saito.
18	5	"The Spy's Seal"; Transliteration: "Kanchō no Kokuin" (Japanese: 間諜の刻印)	August 6, 2007
Louise's sisters move in and make Saito do all the work. At night, Siesta makes a pass at Saito when Louise shows up, just when Louise is about to strike him with a newer whip an explosion occurs. A thief has stolen something belonging to Henrietta and Wales from the principal's office and Osmond pinpoints the woman with a magic seal on her chest. Saito and Julio try to do it secretly, but Louise finds Saito and tries to hurt him again. Then a commotion in Cattleya's room gets their attention. The thief is found out to be Michelle, Agnès' lieutenant. And when everything is done and over with just because Saito didn't tell Louise what he was ordered to do along with other things that were justifiable she beats him with her new whip out of spite.
19	6	"The Queen's Vacation"; Transliteration: "Joō no Kyūjitsu" (Japanese: 女王の休日)	August 13, 2007
Agnes gives Henrietta evidence on a conspirator in Tristain and devises a secret plan to verify it. Saito and Louise were ordered to be at Scarron's Inn to receive further instructions. They take their previous positions and costumes back and are surprised by Julio's appearance. Saito runs into Henrietta who asks him to be her bodyguard as she poses as a commoner when she faked being kidnapped in order to lure out an Albion's spy (Louise is left behind since she would just get in the way). In the rain, Saito and Henrietta evade detection from the soldiers who are searching for the Queen by behaving like sweethearts, while Louise unexpectedly learns of the details of the Queen's mission when she accidentally runs into Agnès, who had been following the spy's courier. In a theater in town, while Scarron and his girls are in the middle of performing a play, Henrietta, Julio, and the Musketeer Force confront Lishman the traitorous finance minister, and his army. Lishman escapes into an underground passageway, but Agnès follows and kills him. The aftermath proves predictable when Louise smells Henrietta's perfume on Saito, while Saito also asks Louise what she'd been doing.
20	7	"The Underground Secret Document"; Transliteration: "Chitei no Himitsu Bunsho" (Japanese: 地底の秘密文書)	August 20, 2007
Henrietta is pressured to sign a declaration of war against Albion. News of a victorious battle for the Tristain and Germania allied forces reaches a town that Louise and Saito are currently in. Saito finds a sailor uniform on sale at a clothes merchants shop but buys it for Siesta instead of Louise. At the academy, Louise and Saito join Agnès and Julio as they explore a secret archive hidden beneath the school, to which Agnès was denied permission. Agnès wishes to obtain information that regards the burning of her hometown of D'Angleterre. Eleonore is picked to open the lock to the entrance. As Mr. Colbert and the group heads farther down, they are joined by Siesta, who is wearing the sailor uniform. Because Louise lacked the chest size to make the uniform look good, Louise blows a part of the cave in the way they came. With little to do but move further, the group finds the archives and is sent to look for the records. When Siesta trips and makes a mess of the books, Eléonore returns them to their proper place with magic, which triggers the archives' security system and begins to bring the bookshelves to a close. Agnès finally finds the information, but a part of the page that lists the person who led the attack is missing. The group narrowly escapes the collapsing of the bridge that led them to the archives. Upon realizing that Louise had blocked their way out, Julio grants Saito permission to have intimate moments with Siesta. She is happy to oblige and then Louise watch and prepares to blow something else up. When Saito points out that the cave which she blew up earlier is in the opposite direction, Louise tells him to shut up and blows them up.
21	8	"The Magic Institute's Crisis"; Transliteration: "Mahō Gakuin no Kiki" (Japanese: 魔法学院の危機)	August 27, 2007
At night, Eléonore puts Louise in jail to prevent her from going into war; even Saito and Colbert agree and don't wish to see more people get hurt. Sheffield sends hired mercenaries to make a surprise attack on the Magic Academy to take all of the female members of royal families' hostage. Tabitha noticed it and warns people. The Musketeer Force surrounds the academy but the mercenaries counteract. Saito releases Louise, and their friends plan on how they will rescue the hostages as it will take too long for the reinforcements to come from the palace. Agnès fights Benubiro the vice-captain. It is discovered Benubiro is one of those who attacked D'Angleterre and burnt it to the ground 20 years ago.
22	9	"The Atonement of Flames"; Transliteration: "Honō no Shokuzai" (Japanese: 炎の贖罪)	September 3, 2007
Mr. Colbert and Saito devise a plan to enter the building to save the hostages. Benubiro explains to Agnès how his captain ruthlessly burnt D'Angleterre to ashes. The team uses their combined magic to enter the building. During the attack, Benubiro recognizes Colbert who is in fact his former captain, Snake of the Flame. The two begin a heated battle. Agnès becomes furious and charges Colbert. Benubiro fires a lethal fireball towards Agnès to stop her from interrupting them, and Colbert pushes her away from the blast and is struck in the crossfire. Agnès takes revenge for her town upon Benubiro and kills him. Agnès recognizes that Colbert was also the person who saved her. Mr. Colbert in his last moments explains what had occurred on that fateful night. He had been given orders to destroy D'Angleterre as it had been reported to be struck with a deadly plague. After discovering there was no plague, he found a girl (Agnès) the only survivor and he carried her to safety. Kirche, Louise, and Saito arrive. Agnès is still infuriated and she holds up her sword to strike a final blow to Colbert, but he dies before she can do so. Louise and Saito are saddened by the death of their teacher as they read a letter written by him saying how much Colbert wanted to see Saito's world, whereas Agnès is still undecided about ever forgiving him.
23	10	"The Enemy on Snowy Alps"; Transliteration: "Setsurei no Teki" (Japanese: 雪嶺の敵)	September 10, 2007
Louise and Saito are sent to Albion and assigned a special mission by Princess Henrietta to disable the enemies' line of defense, the City of South Gotha. The plan is to have Louise's Void magic prevent the engaging battle and deaths of innocent people during the crossfire. Louise accepts, but Saito is reluctant to join because of what he had been told by the late Mr. Colbert. During the assault, Louise is unable to perform her Void magic. They are attacked by air fighters, and the Zero Fighter is forced to abort the mission then land in a snowfall. With no news from Louise and Saito, the Queen agrees to send their army head-on into battle. Meanwhile, Louise debates how to explain their failure to the Queen while Saito carries her on his back. That night, they stay in a snow cave. After Saito suggests that they get naked and stay warm by contact, Louise knocks him unconscious. Realizing that he may die of hypothermia, Louise unbuttons her shirt and lies across Saito. Saito recalls nothing of that night when he wakes up. Sheffield learns of a flying dragon made of steel (the crash-landed Zero fighter plane) and arranges to have it recovered. Saito and Louise are attacked by an enemy air fighter, but having been injured, he quickly collapses. The young man's name is Henry Stalford (ヘンリー, Henrī; voiced by Wataru Hatano), someone who dissolved his engagement to go to war. Saito carries him and explains that his philosophy is to fight for your love, not your honor, and Louise and Saito both agree that Henry should try to return to his ex-fiancée. As the Albion troops arrive to recover the plane and kill the enemy, Henry rejoins them but doesn't tell them about Louise and Saito who are hiding in the nearby trees. The two are rescued by Julio on his dragon. Henry hopes to see the two again someday. Henrietta is relieved the two are okay, but Saito is irritated that Louise is still rather attached to her noble status.
24	11	"The Silver Pentecost"; Transliteration: "Shirogane no Kōrinsai" (Japanese: 銀の降臨祭)	September 17, 2007
Henrietta's forces enter Gothia and claim it as their own. Meanwhile, Louise gets mad at Saito for not understanding her, while Saito thinks the same thing about her. A while later, Henrietta asks for Louise and Saito to scout the enemy forces. As Louise sees Saito, who is fixing the plane, she asks Julio to do the mission with her instead, as he agrees; Saito comes and is confused with what they are doing. Filled with fury, Louise orders Julio to go soon and he did. Albion's dragon forces attack them, but they manage to get away. As they come back, Louise is advised by Derflinger to exchange roles with Saito for a day. Saito unexpectedly meets Siesta and her uncle and cousin who are revealed to be Scarron and Jessica. The gang discovers Louise in a cat costume; she lies to Saito saying it was for Julio. As Guiche arrives and shows his Medal of Honor for coming back from the dead, no one believed him. Saito becomes frustrated with Louise about her arrogant ways of being loyal to the Queen. Siesta takes Saito to a room alone and kisses him then gives him a sleeping potion as a gift. Meanwhile, Sheffield uses the Ring of Andavari to contaminate the water system which causes Henrietta's army to start a rebellion. They soon attack Henrietta, which causes the death of Henrietta's general, Porche.
25	12	"The Farewell Wedding Ceremony"; Transliteration: "Sayonara no Kekkonshiki" (Japanese: さよならの結婚式)	September 24, 2007
Saito rescues Louise from the rebellion. Later, Louise is secretly approached by Henrietta's advisor Mazarin and asked to use her Void magic to hold the enemy off while the Queen and everybody prepares their evacuation; she accepts. Knowing it's a suicide mission since Albion has assembled an army of 70,000, Louise plans to send Saito away to safety but first expresses her desire to marry. They both buy two magical flowers. Knowing of Louise's plan, Saito uses the sleeping potion on her after they wed. Louise passes out before she can tell him that she still and has always loved him, and Saito entrusts her to Julio, asking him to take care of her as he takes her place and opposes Albion's advancing troops. Despite his valiant efforts, Saito eventually falls on the battlefield and dies as all the Tristain ships, including the ones which Louise and Henrietta are on, safely escape. Back at the Tristain academy, everyone mourns the loss of their hero – Saito. Louise has collapsed in grief at Saito's death; however, suddenly the magical flower that is connected to Saito comes back to life. Louise runs out and meets Saito, who is very much alive, and tells her that a Fairy saved and revived him. However, when he mentions that the Fairy had huge breasts, Louise flies into a jealous rage and shoots explosion spells at Saito once again.

== The Familiar of Zero: Rondo of Princesses (2008) ==
No. overall	No. in series	Title	Original release date
26	1	"The Familiar's Mark"; Transliteration: "Tsukaima no Kokuin" (Japanese: 使い魔の刻印)	July 6, 2008
Saito has been revived, but his runes have faded away. Louise is worried since Saito is now no longer her familiar. Agnès informs Saito and Louise they are being summoned by the Queen while the school celebrates the ending war with Albion. On the journey, the three are attacked by Sheffield, who is revealed to be the familiar of a Void mage. At the castle, Henrietta gives Saito a document that would make him a chevalier and effectively a noble. Saito declines because of his lack of Gandálfr abilities. He remembers the name of the Elf who saved him: Tiffania, and Derflinger tells them where to find her. That night, while worrying about recent events, Louise finds Saito on the balcony. She tells him that she is afraid he will leave again, especially with the disappearance of the runes. He reassures them he will not leave despite the absence of their contract. However, when he tries to make out with her, she blows him up. The next day, having demoted him from the status of "dog" to that of "flea", Louise makes Saito run after the carriage on foot.
27	2	"The Elf of the Forest"; Transliteration: "Mori no Yōsei" (Japanese: 森の妖精)	July 13, 2008
Saito, Louise, and Agnès travel to Tiffania's village, and Siesta joins them. Louise gets into another fight with Saito and walks off. Agnès makes a wooden sword and spars with Saito. The next day, they find Tiffania, who is happy to see Saito again but whose chest size shocks Louise and Siesta. Later that night at Tiffania's hut when Saito tries to clear up a misunderstanding, Louise runs off and Siesta follows, but they are attacked by Sheffield, who summons Fenrir wolves. Louise loses her wand and Siesta tries to help but is knocked down. Louise's magic isn't strong enough; out of desperation, she performs the summoning, and Saito surprisingly appears again, forcing Sheffield to retreat. They renew their contract with a kiss, and Saito gets his "Gandálfr" runes burned onto his hand again. Saito and Louise are about to share an intimate moment until Siesta interrupts. Sheffield reports to her master, Joseph.
28	3	"The Return of the Hero"; Transliteration: "Eiyū no Okaeri" (Japanese: 英雄のおかえり)	July 20, 2008
Tiffania travels back to Tristain with the group. While introducing herself to the Queen, she is asked to remove her hat, revealing her elf heritage with her long pointed elf ears. Although elves are shunned by human society, Tiffania explains that she is in fact a half-elf: her mother was an elf who died years earlier and her father was the Archduke of Albion. Henrietta shows compassion for Tiffania. They discuss Sheffield's comment about other Void mages. Henrietta offers to knight Saito again and he accepts. Siesta then announces she is Saito's personal maid by order of the Queen, much to Louise's frustration. Tiffania is also revealed to be cousins with Henrietta, and she decides to stay at the castle until she figures out what she wants to do. Saito, Louise, and Siesta return to the academy for a big celebration. Guiche is now the captain of the student corps known as The Knights of Ordine and has appointed Saito their vice-captain. Reynald, Malicorne, and the Ordine knights carry Saito away.
29	4	"The Rumored Accepted Student"; Transliteration: "Uwasa no Hennyūsei" (Japanese: 噂の編入生)	July 27, 2008
Since returning to the Academy, Saito and Louise have spent less quality time together since he has been busy training with the Knights of Ordine. Tiffania shows up as a transfer student, who attracts attention from the boys and arouses jealousy not only from Louise but also from a noble student named Beatrice, who later bullies Tiffania until Saito and Guiche intervene. The next day, Tiffania unveils her elf heritage in front of a class, and Beatrice uses her religious authority to put Tiffania through an interrogation where she will be punished by being placed into a cauldron of boiling water. Saito tries to intervene, but after Guiche warns him that his actions would put his beloved in danger, Saito begs Beatrice for mercy. When she refuses, Saito draws his sword; he and the Ordine knights fight Beatrice's knights until Louise, who was having a pleasant dream about Saito, ends the conflict with a giant explosion. She then clarifies that Beatrice has no real authority to conduct the trial. When her sycophantic followers desert her, Beatrice is utterly crushed, but Tiffania forgives her. Visiting Saito in the infirmary, Tiffania asks him to check her breasts to see if they are real or fake, but Louise and Siesta show up in time to witness this, with a typical reaction from Louise.
30	5	"The Alluring Women's Bath"; Transliteration: "Miwaku no Joshiburo" (Japanese: 魅惑の女子風呂)	August 3, 2008
Saito is ordered to sign a confession that states he took advantage of Tiffania in the infirmary and promises to never touch anyone else's breasts; he refuses and insists that Tiffania asked him first. As the girls thank the boys by showering them with gifts, Guiche, Gimili, Reynald, and Malicorne try to cheer Saito up by having Verdandi dig a peephole to the girls' bath. They observe as Tiffania confirms to Louise that she asked Saito to check her, and Louise worries about her response but denies they are lovers. The hole is noticed and the girls swiftly find and punish the boys, except for Saito who escapes thanks to Tabitha, who then passes out. A band of magical dolls arrive and dance in a formal ball, as they do every night (they remind Saito of his first dance with Louise), and Louise shows up. She asks Saito if he peeped, and Saito admits it but only because the boys dragged him. They reconcile and embrace until Tabitha wakes up naked. Louise then forces him to sign the paper again.
31	6	"Forbidden Magic Drug"; Transliteration: "Kindan no Mahō Yaku" (Japanese: 禁断の魔法薬)	August 10, 2008
Scarron and Jessica encourage Siesta to try harder to win Saito's heart and give her a love dust potion. Louise drags a tied-up Saito to her room; Siesta argues with Louise that she can treat Saito better, and negotiates for one hour for that purpose. In Siesta's room, she tells Saito they get to act like newlyweds, but Saito is too conscious of the situation and asks for food. After failing to seduce Saito with the naked apron, Siesta attempts to try out the potion but accidentally drops it on Montmorency, who inhales it and falls in love with Louise who was nearby. This time the potion's effects are spread by kissing: Montmorency and Louise affect Jessica, Beatrice, and Scarron. They go after Tiffania, but she casts a Memory spell to wipe their memories and restores them. Montmorency forgives Siesta for causing the mess. Later, Tabitha receives a special mission; as she heads out with Sylphid, Sheffield flies alongside and tells her if she does well on the mission she can cure her mother.
32	7	"The Sleipnir Ball"; Transliteration: "Sureipunīru no Butōkai" (Japanese: スレイプニィルの舞踏会)	August 17, 2008
Siesta continues to annoy Louise but proposes to stop if Saito can locate Louise at the Sleipnir Ball, a party where the participants disguise themselves as their ideal person by using the Mirror of Truth. The night of the ball, Louise transforms into Cattleya, while her classmates pick knights, Beatrice and her friends chose Tiffania; Guiche chooses himself. On the way to the ball, Saito sees a dark shape that flies overhead. He finds "Louise" at the balcony and after some confusion over his "continue where they left off" remark, they embrace and kiss. Meanwhile, Sheffield disrupts the party and the mirror is shattered. Saito discovers he is holding Henrietta; who chose Louise as her role model, the two almost kiss again before Louise sees them and runs away in tears. Saito chases her but is stopped by Tabitha, who is allied with Sheffield and attacks him. Louise is confronted by Sheffeld and allows herself to be hypnotized. Saito eventually defeats Tabitha but spares her life. He frees Louise from Sheffield's spell, but Louise's anger causes her to fall. Saito calms Louise with a kiss but they are surrounded by enemy gargoyles. Suddenly a wave of fire magic from the large dragon shape saves them: an airship with Kirche and a living Mr. Colbert, and Sheffield and Tabitha flee.
33	8	"The Eastern Pursuit!"; Transliteration: "Osutoranto Gō no Tsuiseki" (Japanese: 東方号の追跡)	August 24, 2008
Colbert is alive; he had faked his death thanks to Tabitha. Using knowledge from the Zero Fighter, he constructed the airship called "Ostland" with an advanced coal-burning steam engine and invites everyone on it. Saito worries about what to say about Tabitha. Louise is still suspicious about what she witnessed between Henrietta and Saito and enlists the help of Siesta and Tiffania to capture Saito and find out the truth by using a magic item that will reflect what happened the previously night. Pursued across the ship (under the mistaken impression the magic item will strip him naked), Saito hides into the boiler room, which reminds him of his world. Saito is finally cornered by the increasingly desperate trio, but instead, the magic item reveals Tabitha's involvement in the previous night's escapade. Kirche reveals Tabitha's past to everyone and deduces that it was King Joseph of Gallia who was trying to abduct Louise. Saito and Henrietta have difficulty meeting one another throughout the event, but the affair concludes with Louise's resolution to trust Saito, while Siesta remains concerned. Meanwhile, Tabitha returns to her family home to find it wrecked and her mother missing. A mysterious person calling himself Bidashal easily defeats her and Sylphid and takes her prisoner.
34	9	"Tabitha's Younger Sister"; Transliteration: "Tabasa no Imōto" (Japanese: タバサの妹)	August 31, 2008
The Ondine Knights are searching for evidence regarding Tabitha when a nude girl drops from the sky onto Malicorne and then hugs Saito; Louise reacts to this by kicking Saito in the groin. The girl, who calls herself Illococoo, talks about saving her older sister, referring to Tabitha. Illococoo describes how Tabitha has been arrested as a traitor and stripped of her chevalier title, and how Tabitha's ill mother was also arrested. When Illococoo asks for help, Malicorne and Saito volunteer promptly, but the others doubt her status as Tabitha's younger sister (Tabitha is rather flat-chested and Illococoo has large breasts). Illococoo thinks about obtaining proof and rushes out the door. The Ondine Knights rush out as well, only to find that Illococoo has vanished. Almost immediately, Sylphid appears and testifies for Illococoo. Saito, Guiche, Malicorne, and Louise go to Henrietta to ask for permission to go to Gallia and rescue Tabitha, but she denies their request on the grounds that as her personal knights if Tabitha is rescued by the Ondine Knights while she is still considered a criminal the rescue could be perceived as an act of aggression on Tristain's part. In response, Saito, Guiche, and Malicorne resign as knights in order not to implicate Tristain, and Henrietta responds by having them arrested. Illococoo warns the others about their impending arrest. Louise confronts Henrietta and asks her what she thinks of Saito... as a man and not a chevalier, and Henrietta admits that she is not sure if she has really fallen for Saito or simply needs someone to lean on. Louise declares she will help Tabitha as she renounces her nobility, and Henrietta has no choice but to arrest her too, although Saito is overjoyed Louise did something selfless for once. After trying, unsuccessfully, to dig their way out of the prison with spoons, the four prisoners are rescued by Kirche and Colbert. Derflinger forces Illococoo to reveal that she is really Sylphid, a nature dragon that can assume human form, much to Malicorne's dismay. In Gallia, Tabitha is reunited with her mother and told by Bidashal Vitartial, an Elf working for King Joseph, that she will be made to drink the same potion that destroyed her mother's mind.
35	10	"Border Mountain Pass"; Transliteration: "Kokkyō no Tōge" (Japanese: 国境の峠)	September 7, 2008
Saito and company take refugees in the Charming Fairy Inn while the search for them continues. A plan is hatched to use the Ostland to fly towards Germania as a decoy while everybody else goes across the Gallia border directly. Scarron provides disguises for them, while Colbert, Siesta, Gimili, and Reynard proceed to liberate the Ostland. Siesta shows doubts at first of not having any powers but is encouraged by Saito that she could still help. She hugs him, so Louise kicks him in the groin from behind again. In Gallia, Joseph and Sheffield uncover a massive object, which Joseph calls Jormungand, covered with pulsing veins with a single large eye. Posing as a traveling circus, Saito and company cross the border while Louise broods over no longer being an aristocrat, realizing she only has Saito left. Back at the castle, using Siesta as a distraction, Gimili and Reynard take out two guards and they board the Ostland, after dispatching two more groups of guards. Colbert quickly fires up the Ostland, eventually ripping it free of the chains. Agnès falls for the ploy, ordering guards to watch the Germania border. Louise sprains her ankle and Saito tells her to rely on him, carrying her on his back. She wonders how Saito can be so strong, despite being alone in this world. The Ostland is eventually stopped by Tristan dragon knights, and Agnès nearly strikes Colbert upon seeing him alive. Saito and the gang arrive in Gallia as Tabitha, sitting by her unconscious mother's bedside, begins to lose hope.
36	11	"Captive in Alhambra"; Transliteration: "Āhanbura no Toriko" (Japanese: アーハンブラの虜)	September 14, 2008
Using her "persuasion" talents, Kirche discovers that Tabitha is being held in Alhambra Castle. Upon arriving there, the gang decides upon a plan of attack. Under the pretext of having a stage show, they have the soldiers drink alcohol-laced with sleeping potion. Kirche reveals that she knows Louise is a Void mage, apologizes for her past behavior, and invites her over to Germania. Later on, Derflinger advises Saito to say something kind to her, saying that Void magic is dependent on emotional strength. Saito decides to do so and finds her posing in front of a mirror in a dancing costume. Louise begins to tempt Saito and he pushes her onto the bed, but they are interrupted by Guiche. In Tristain, Agnès frees Colbert; she tells him that she cannot forgive him for burning her village, but has a chance to end the cycle of hatred that would erupt should she kill Colbert. Back in Alhambra, the local Baron wants Louise to attend to him personally, and she agrees, planning to drug his wine, but the sleeping potion has slipped out of her slightly too-large dancing top. Saito and Tiffania find the bottle and go to rescue Louise, Tiffania using her Memory spell to wipe the Baron's memories. Having drugged all the soldiers, they encounter Bidashal, who easily stops their attacks using Counter. Derflinger tells Louise to cast Dispel on him, which she does, allowing Saito to break through Bidashal's Counter. Tiffania stops Saito from killing Bidashal, who tells them where Tabitha is and lets them go, warning them that Joseph is a cold-blooded man and that it won't end there. At her mother's bedside, Tabitha is awakened by Illococoo and Saito and cries in joy upon seeing the gang, as Sheffield spies on them.
37	12	"Wings of Freedom"; Transliteration: "Jiyū no Tsubasa" (Japanese: 自由の翼)	September 21, 2008
As the reunited gang makes their way through a forest back to Tristain, Louise has a nightmare in which she loses the ability to cast magic; waking up, she finds that her nightmare has come true. Saito finds Tabitha reading a book Bidashal had given her, and she begins to teach him how to read this world's language, but Louise interrupts, telling Saito that she can no longer use magic. Tabitha says that she will protect Saito since Louise is unable to do so. In Tristain, Henrietta dispatches the Ostland and Colbert to rendezvous with Saito, carrying a type of cannon (revealed to be a German FlaK 36), and Agnès offers the assistance of the Musketeer Corps. Saito, under Tabitha's guidance, learns to read quickly, while Louise broods over her inability to cast magic. Overhearing Tabitha telling Saito that under the influence of Gandálfr, the heart will experience changes, Louise wonders if Saito loves her because of Gandálfr's influence. Just before crossing the border, the Jormungand, a Square-class golem with Sheffield on its shoulder, lands in front of the carriage, blocking off the route into Tristan. Illococoo changed back into Sylphid, and she and Tabitha launch into the air in order to lure Sheffield away. Saito realizes her objective is Louise, but Louise jumps out of the carriage and is captured. Guiche, Kirche, and Tabitha's attacks prove ineffective against the golem. Louise decides to sacrifice herself for her friends. Saito leaps to attack the golem again, releasing Louise, and Slyphid saves them in time. Colbert has unloaded the cannon, which Saito examines using his powers. He quickly fires at the golem but is stopped by Counter. Colbert, Kirche, and Malicorne unleash their most powerful spells and manage to stop its advance. Derflinger tells Saito that Dispel needs to be cast onto the missile, but Louise keeps saying that she can't do it. Tabitha then kisses Saito, causing feelings of intense jealousy to erupt in Louise and activating her Void powers again. Louise casts Dispel on the cannon shell, which successfully pierces the Counter and destroys the golem. Aboard the Ostland, Louise awakens to see Saito; he hugs her, saying he genuinely does love her. They look at each other and kiss. Back in Tristain, Louise kneels before the Queen, awaiting punishment for defying her. Instead, Henrietta awards her the royal mantle, declaring that Louise is now her sister and second successor to the throne; she also returns to Saito, Malicorne, and Guiche their chevalier cloak, reinstating their noble status. She then welcomes Tabitha as Princess Charlotte back to Tristain. The ending credits show Louise trying to explode Saito when she sees Tabitha holding onto him, but Sylphid grabs Saito and escapes with him and Tabitha.
OVA	6.5	"Seductive Beach"; Transliteration: "Yūwaku no Sunahama" (Japanese: 誘惑の砂浜)	December 25, 2008
Saito and Osmond examine a wooden chest, the contents of which Saito recognizes as having come from his world. The Academy students go to a beach for their summer trip, along with Siesta, Henrietta, and Agnès; however, they are all wearing old-fashioned swimsuits that cover their bodies. Osmond asks the girls to put on the "traditional uniforms for the ritual for the spirit of water" (which are the items from the chest). The girls change into these "uniforms" (revealed as one piece swimsuits, then bikinis) as they perform the "rituals" of splashing each other and smashing watermelons. The final "ritual" is a beach volleyball tournament where the winners will wear the "true Priestess' garments"; the boys bend the rules so that Tiffania's team advances. That night, after Saito obliviously stands Louise up for a nighttime beach walk, she discovers the boys' and Osmond's plan of tricking the girls into wearing extremely skimpy seashells and starfish bikinis. The next morning, Montmorency excuses the girls for not showing up (due to leg cramps and sunburn) but tells Saito that Louise wants to meet with him at a secluded part of the beach. Saito arrives but is ambushed by the girls. The other guys and Osmond are ambushed in a similar fashion, and as a result, they are made to wear skimpy garments while tied to rocks in the rising tide. The girls go back in the water but are attacked by a giant octopus that supposedly appears every 30 years. Saito breaks free and rescues the girls. Later, while Saito cooks octopus treats, the girls try on the seashells and stars, while the ogling males are still tied up. As Saito arrives with Japanese-style food, he inadvertently sees Louise who loses her top in the commotion.

== The Familiar of Zero F (2012) ==
No. overall	No. in series	Title	Original release date
38	1	"Louise of the Holy Ground"; Transliteration: "Seikoku no Ruizu" (Japanese: 聖国のルイズ)	January 7, 2012
Louise wakes up to hear Saito making perverted comments in his sleep, resulting in her blowing him up, and Tabitha intervenes. Colbert arrives to tell them and their friends that they have been summoned to Romalia. Upon arriving there aboard the Ostland, they meet up with Julio, who takes them to the Cathedral, where Henrietta and Romalia's pope Vittorio Serevare is. Vittorio discloses that he knows Louise is a Void mage while also identifying himself, Tiffania, and Gallia's King Joseph as Void mages, and explains they must assemble as a group to balance their world. Julio also reveals that he is Vittorio's familiar. Vittorio asks Louise and Tiffania to join him in this endeavor by becoming his priestesses for His Eminence's annual ceremony, to which Louise readily accepts, leading to an argument with Saito over her decision. During the night, Tiffania asks Colbert to help her summon a familiar. Louise notices two suspicious people, while Siesta talks with Saito about Louise's reason for her decision. Louise follows and confront the two individuals who were Jack & Bleu, stealing a mirror artifact. She tries to fight back but she is captured. Saito goes into the building finding Louise captured. He frees her and Jack battles him, allowing Bleu to escape, while below them Tiffania begins her summoning ritual. Jack has defeated thanks to Louise's magic, but Saito falls off the roof they are on and into the portal for Tiffania's ritual, coming out through the other side. The next morning, Saito tells Louise he will support her and her decision and they reconcile with a kiss, which Tiffania accidentally interrupts. Tiffania then wonders if Saito could be her familiar, while also showing signs of having feelings for him.
39	2	"Aquileia's Shrine Maiden"; Transliteration: "Akuireia no Miko" (Japanese: 水都市の巫女)	January 14, 2012
Louise and Saito enjoy some time alone as they explore a bazaar in the city of Aquileia. Henrietta asks Vittorio to keep Louise and Tiffania safe but despite both his and Julio's assurances Agnès and Henrietta still suspect trouble. Tiffania wonders if she really did summon Saito and notes that how seeing him makes her feel flustered. Louise shows off her priestess outfit to Saito and they begin to get intimate, but Malicorne ruins their moment. In Gallia, Bidalsha creates fire stones for Joseph, who reveals he will use them as weapons while Sheffield confirms that she will help to enact his plan tomorrow. The next day after His Eminence's annual ceremony, Tiffania tries to confirm if Saito is her familiar by kissing him, but the two are interrupted by Malicorne. Meanwhile, Louise is approached by a plebeian who asks her to heal her sick mother as a priestess. In the alleyway, the girl stabs Louise with a poisoned knife that paralyzes Louise and reveals herself as Jeanette, Bleu's sister and one of the four Gensou Siblings. Louise is then handed over to Sheffield. While searching for Louise, Saito commences a duel with Bleu. Their battle is cut short when Jeanette appears and Saito discovers that Louise has been kidnapped. Everyone regroups and Tabitha reveals the kidnappers are from Gallia, meaning Joseph is behind the kidnapping. Before they can act, they are informed that Gallia's airships are heading towards Romalia. Aboard one of the ships, Joseph introduces himself to Louise and tells her he will use her as part of his plan...
40	3	"The Incompetent King Gone Mad"; Transliteration: "Munō-58 no Ranshin" (Japanese: 無能王の乱心)	January 21, 2012
Sheffield uses the stolen mirror artifact to transfer Louise's Explosion spell to Joseph and he uses it to detonate a firestone, destroying the airships attacking him. Saito and Tabitha make their way towards Joseph's ship while he detonates another stone on the retreating ships. Louise manages to escape and takes the last stone with her, but Sheffield's gargoyle recovers it as Saito and Tabitha arrive to save Louise. Tabitha and Louise go after the gargoyle, while Saito uses Julio's gift, a modern pistol, to incapacitate Sheffield and confront Joseph. On the ground, Tiffania uses her Memory spell to confuse the gargoyle, allowing Tabitha and Sylphid to recover the stone. Joseph uses his Void power, Acceleration, to move at high speed and subdue Saito, but Louise and Tabitha return and save him. Tabitha fatally wounds her uncle but decides against killing him just as Sheffield returns and forces the group to leave her to die with Joseph, who shows a sign of affection for once, so the trio escape just as the ship explodes from the last stone. Back at the Cathedral, Saito voices his suspicions that Vittorio used Louise as bait to lure Joseph and kill him, which Vittorio admits to. Louise tells Saito that it's all right since she has him to protect her and he agrees, reaffirming their bond. Tiffania, who was watching, both admires and is saddened by their close bond, believing it proves that Saito is not her familiar. The people of Aquileia then cheer for the "Holy Maiden" (Louise) and "the Hero" (Saito).
41	4	"The Queen's Reward"; Transliteration: "Joō-heika no Onshō" (Japanese: 女王陛下の恩賞)	January 28, 2012
At the Magic Academy, a ball is held in celebration of Louise, Saito, and the others' deeds in Romalia. Louise and Saito dance and he expresses his wish to be with her forever, leading to a passionate kiss between the two. Meanwhile, in Gallia, Tabitha uses an antidote given to her by Bidalsha to cure her mother. The following day, Siesta overhears how Tiffania tried to kiss Saito and suggests to Louise that they should separate Saito from Tiffania by buying a mansion where only he and Louise would live, to which Louise agrees. Louise rejects all of Saito and Siesta's choices and becomes further irritated when Siesta reveals she too will be living with them. Things become worse for the girls when they discover Saito has become increasingly popular with women due to his heroic status while at Scarron's inn, and so decide to hasten their efforts. Back in Gallia, Tabitha is asked by her mother to become the new queen for both the country and her father's wish. Three days later, Agnès brings Saito and Louise to Henrietta, who informs them that Tabitha will be Gallia's new queen and rewards Saito for his previous deeds with a portion of her territory. Saito, Louise, and Siesta arrive in their new land, "De Ornielle", only to find that it is something of a wilderness and that their mansion is old and decrepit, but they decide to stay anyway since it was a gift. That night, the trio is visited by Tabitha, who announces that she will be moving in with them since she postponed her coronation.
42	5	"The Maidens of De Ornielle"; Transliteration: "Do Oruniēru no Otome-tachi" (Japanese: ド・オルニエールの乙女たち)	February 4, 2012
In De Ornielle, Tabitha still hasn't decided if she wishes to be the queen of Gallia yet, Illococoo says Tabitha wants to be married and have a baby before she becomes queen. Louise and Saito spend time with each other on a hill and they share a kiss. Eléonore soon comes over and tells she disapproves of Louise living with a random noble like Saito and demands her to return home. Louise then convinces her sister to let her stay by promising to have Saito act like a noble. Louise starts training Saito for the whole day and the two inevitably argue, leaving Saito sleeping on a busted lounge chair in the basement. Later that night, as Louise lies worried in bed, while Saito discovers a hidden passage that leads to a secret room with a mystical mirror. He touches the mirror and finds that it is a portal that connects to Henrietta's mirror. Henrietta goes through the mirror, and after showing him her body and discussing the nature of love, she and Saito succumb to the tension and begin to kiss passionately. As Louise explores the mansion to search for Saito, she finds Saito in the room where she sees him and Henrietta still making out. Her tears fall while she quietly leaves the passage, as Henrietta's lips prove too intoxicating for the two to notice Louise. After wrapping up the hot kiss, Saito tells Henrietta that he truly loves Louise and cannot accept Henrietta's feelings. Saito soon leaves, but Derflinger tells him that Louise was there crying, and Saito runs off to find Louise leaving on a horse. Louise just smiles and apologizes for not realizing his feelings towards the princess and depart to the Magic Academy. At there, Tabitha tells Louise that if Louise doesn't want him, she would have Saito as her husband. Kirche explains to Louise that queens (i.e. nobility) can't freely fall in love since they are often betrothed, so she must be honest with Saito and tell her true feelings so as to not put him in a struggle. Saito is afterward seen on the hill again, thinking about going back to his world since Louise is not there with him. Louise comes back to Saito and confesses that she wants to be with him forever. Saito happily tells Louise that she is the one with whom he is in love with and they embrace each other.
43	6	"Trouble at the Outdoor Bath"; Transliteration: "Haran no Rotenburo" (Japanese: 波乱の露天風吕)	February 11, 2012
A hot spring is unearthed near De Ornielle, so Saito decides to modify it into a bath and invites everyone he knows to try it. Louise later thanks Tabitha for helping her make up with Saito, but Tabitha warns her that she meant every word and that next time she will take Saito for herself. That night, Illococoo reminds Tabitha that she is running out of time with her decision, so Tabitha chooses to make her move on Saito, but her attempt is quickly stopped by Louise. The following morning, everyone arrives where they are greeted with everyone else invited (with the boys totally excited at the mistaken thought of mixed-sex bathing). Upon everyone else's arrival, Siesta and Louise spot a hooded figure entering the mansion. Louise and Siesta capture the figure, who turns out to be Henrietta, who says she wanted to try the hot spring. As Henrietta and Louise bathe, Louise confronts Henrietta about her feelings towards Saito, which soon turns into a catfight since Henrietta confesses that she loves Saito. They soon make up; although Henrietta tells Louise she will still pursue Saito (not wanting to regret about Wales). Later, Saito talks with Henrietta to assure his feelings for Louise clear and the life he had back in his world, but Henrietta reassures him that she has not given up on him. The girls then enjoy a group bath (interrupted by the boys, who are swiftly dealt with), but Tiffania soon becomes light-headed from soaking too long, so she stays for the night as everyone else leaves. With everyone gone, Louise and Saito bathe together in the hot spring and promise to die together, and kiss. The two soon return to their room where they passionately kiss. As Louise lies down, she signs at Saito that she wants to have sex. But when Saito discovers Tiffania asleep in their room, Louise misunderstands her presence and blows Saito up in anger about breaking his promise not to cheat on her.
44	7	"Elves from the Desert"; Transliteration: "Sabaku no Erufu" (Japanese: 砂漠のエルフ)	February 18, 2012
As Tabitha is about to depart for Gallia, the Gensou Siblings (Jack, Bleu, and Jeanette) attack De Ornielle to kill Saito, so a battle between them against Saito and his friends break out. As the battle goes on, a trio of elves sneaks in to capture Tiffania, but Saito confronts them. The fourth sibling, Damian, appears and uses alchemy to cease the fighting because it's not worth the trouble, especially since they're not being paid for it, and one of the elves uses that magic with his own to capture both Tiffania and Saito. Later, the two awaken in a desert oasis and meet their captor, a female elf named Luctiana. At Tristain, Henrietta tells Louise they cannot send a rescue party since Romalia is handling the situation, but Louise resolves to save Saito anyway. Luctiana tells Saito and Tiffania she is holding them to study human culture, and also reveals the reason why they were kidnapped was that Tiffania is a Void mage, a power which elves fear, and because Saito is Gandálfr. As Louise prepares to leave, she is joined by Siesta and Tabitha, who are then joined by the rest of their friends on the Ostland. Saito and Tiffania try to escape but are unable to since magic binds them to the area. Saito assures Tiffania that they will escape, and the two decide to go for a swim in the oasis, where Saito discovers the submerged wreckage of a F-4EJ Phantom II fighter jet.
45	8	"Escape Through the Sewer"; Transliteration: "Tōbō no Chikasuidō" (Japanese: 逃亡の地下水道)	February 25, 2012
Saito is examining the fighter jet when the elves come to take him and Tiffania to a council to judge what is going to happen to them: since they are a Void user of Void and a Gandalfr, many elves believe that they will bring destruction to the world. Saito tries to protect Tiffania from being harmed and the elves unquestioningly conclude to have them terminated. While imprisoned, Saito also becomes Tiffania's familiar when they kiss and a rune appears on his chest: revealing that she really did summon Saito from back in Romalia. Saito and Tiffania are able to break out and try to escape underground thanks to the efforts of Luctiana, her boyfriend Arie, and her uncle Bidalsha. These helpers are soon considered traitors who have sided with a Void mage. Meanwhile, aboard the Ostland, the gang flies into the elvish territory, Neftes, at full speed to pass and to avoid chaos, but are later caught by a patrol ship. Louise concentrates on her desire to see Saito and vice versa, subconsciously casting a spell that causes a large magic portal to open for Saito, becoming their escape route. When Louise begins to faint, Saito holds her hand, his newly-gained familiar's power sending some of his energy to her. They escape and Bidalsha convinces the elves on board to let them go home, with Luctiana and Arie tagging along while Bidalsha remains behind.
46	9	"Tabitha's Coronation"; Transliteration: "Tabasa no Taikan" (Japanese: タバサの戴冠)	March 3, 2012
The group arrives in Beautis, Gallia's capital, and prepares for Tabitha's coronation. While Tiffania and Saito are becoming closer, Louise and Siesta worry that Tiffania might try and seduce Saito. Meanwhile, Luctiana and Arie are given a guest suite to stay in for the duration of the coronation, and Guiche and Malicorne are asked to guard the two and prevent them from disrupting the ceremony. Louise requests Saito's help to get her dressed in preparation, and as Saito nervously tightens her dress, he notices Louise's breasts have grown slightly. Later, Luctiana escapes to explore, to which Guiche, Arie, and Malicorne head out to look for her together. Henrietta calls Louise, Saito, Tiffania to the palace's throne room, where Vittorio and Julio are also present. After congratulating Tabitha on her accepting the role of Gallia's new queen, Louise explains how her new Void magic, known as the "World Door", was used to rescue Saito and Tiffania, followed by Saito revealing his new runes to Vittorio who identifies them as Lífþrasir, which allows him to boost the power of a Void user's magic. Kirche and Montmorency agree to spend a girls-only night with Tabitha and Illococoo to celebrate her upcoming coronation and their last night together. While going to Tabitha's room, they find Guiche questioning a maid as to Luctiana's location, with Montmorency mistaking the situation as flirting. Seeing how Guiche and Montmorency's relationship is similar to Arie's with Luctiana, the two men come to an understanding. The girls run into Luctiana, and she and Montmorency also begin getting along. The following morning, Tabitha has crowned the new Queen. While preparing for the party following the coronation, Louise brings up her question from the previous day. Saito states that his master is irrelevant because his love is only for her. Worrying that they'd be late for the party, Saito goes on ahead. While searching for him, Louise overhears a conversation between Vittorio and Julio, discussing a consequential side-effect of Saito's new-found familiar power: while his new runes give him the power to boost Void magic, the user's strength gradually diminishes with every use, which would eventually result in the user's death. Vittorio had deliberately kept this from Saito as he feared the consequences would frighten him, as well as knowing this power would be required to overcome a peril that could threaten the entire world. Louise worries that she'll lose Saito.
47	10	"The Awakening of Calamity"; Transliteration: "Saiyaku no Mezame" (Japanese: 災厄の目覚め)	March 10, 2012
Louise and Saito are dancing in the grand ballroom, with Louise lost in the thought of Saito's life-risking Lífþrasir power. The next day, Siesta walks into Louise and Saito's room to see Louise sitting on the edge of the bed. Agnès arrives and informs Louise that she, Saito, and Tiffania are summoned by Henrietta. The Queen tells them that His Eminence has requested their urgent help, and calls upon Sylphid to escort them. Upon reaching Romalia, they see Aquileia being engulfed in flames while being attacked by a swarm of dragons. Julio prevents them getting hit by a fire blast launched by an enormous dragon and escorts them to Romalia. The Pope requests the trio's help to stop the legendary "Ancient Dragon" and asks Saito to use his newfound abilities, to which Louise objects. When they arrive at the location where they will confront the dragon, Louise informs Saito of the consequences of using Lífþrasir's power, but he agrees to use them to protect Romalia and Louise despite the drawback. The accompanying army traps the Ancient dragon in a valley, and Vittorio uses his Void magic on the dragon; it usually functions as a Recovery spell but has a damaging effect against entities of evil. Tiffania uses her Memory spell to disburse the dragon's army. Saito uses his powers to strengthen Vittorio, but the Ancient Dragon possesses Julio's dragon, causing it to move towards the dragon's mouth as it begins blasting them with fire. Derflinger demands that Saito draws him to absorb the attack, but the Ancient Dragon's power proves too much and Derflinger shatters, propelling Saito off the back of the possessed dragon only to be caught by Louise and Tiffania. Knowing he can no longer fend off the dragon with his magic, Vittorio shoves Julio off the back of his dragon, saving him at the cost of being devoured by the Ancient Dragon.
48	11	"Louise's Choice"; Transliteration: "Ruizu no Sentaku" (Japanese: ルイズの選択)	March 17, 2012
Everyone regroups in Gallia's royal palace to assess the situation: while the Ancient Dragon has stopped moving, it is not dead, and now with only two Void mages the chances of defeating it are very low. Osmond is called in and he states that they may have a chance if all the nations band together, to which Henrietta, Tabitha, and Julio agree. Saito awakens and, despite being depressed about the loss of Derflinger, resolves to keep fighting, causing Louise to fear for his safety. Saito recalls the fighter jet in Luctiana's oasis, but since it is run-down, he and Louise figure that by using her World Door spell they can travel to Saito's world (Japan) and acquire a new one for the upcoming battle. Using Saito's Lífþrasir powers, Louise opens a door to Japan, but when Saito steps through, Louise openly states she loves him for the first time and lets go of his hand to close the 'door', forcing him to stay in the safety of his own world. With her friends watching this happen, Louise weeps about her hard decision. Everyone begins to mobilize, and Osmond informs Louise and Tiffania that while the power of the Void can defeat the Ancient Dragon, it's consuming a Void user will also empower it; thus the two girls will be the dragon's next target. Osmond mentions that the battle will be held at the Magic Academy since it has been evacuated, but upon arriving they find that no one has left: all of Louise's friends, including Siesta, Luctiana, Arie, and even the Gensou Siblings assure her they will fight together to save their world. Back in Japan, Saito tries to return to Halkeginia by visiting the spot from where he was summoned, but to no avail. The Ancient Dragon awakens, assuming a new form with wings, and takes flight, obliterating the fleet that was monitoring it, and makes its way towards the Magic Academy.
49	12	"The Familiar of Zero"; Transliteration: "Zero no Tsukaima" (Japanese: ゼロの使い魔)	March 24, 2012
The students of the Magic Academy set a barrier to hold off the Ancient Dragon and its minions while waiting for reinforcements. Meanwhile, Saito returns to his house, but instead of going in he decides to find a way to return to Halkeginia to help Louise, and upon seeing an article in a newspaper has an idea. Despite the combined efforts of the students and forces of Tristain (armed with the FlaK 36), including Gallia, Romaila, and an Elven fleet led by Bidalsha, the dragons break into the academy. Louise escapes with Tiffania on Sylphid to protect the others, as the Ancient Dragon's target is only the two of them. Back in Japan, Saito manages to hijack a F-2A Jet Fighter and flies through a solar eclipse, returning to Halkeginia, then fires missiles on the Ancient Dragon, saving Louise before she is about to be eaten by it. Derflinger appears before Saito in the cockpit's computer screen, much to his surprise; Derflinger was actually alive inside Saito's Gandálfr runes. Saito fires all of the fighter's missiles into the Ancient Dragon, but it only weakens its defenses. Louise contacts Saito through the World Door and he pulls her through it into the cockpit to have her cast the Explosion spell combined with Lífþrasir's power on the dragon, but she refuses out of fear for his safety. Saito tells her he will not die no matter what and reassures Louise with a kiss, finally convincing her. Closing on the dragon, Saito, and Louise eject from the jet as it crashes into the dragon, further weakening it, and then Louise casts the enhanced Explosion spell, destroying the Ancient Dragon for good. Louise and an unconscious Saito land safely but Louise gets desperate if his life was extinguished by Lífþrasir's side effect. Then Saito awakens, revealing that in spite of the exhausting of Lífþrasir's power, Saito's other rune kept him alive. They are soon joined by all their friends, prompting Saito to propose to Louise, which she happily accepts. Sometime later at a church, Saito and Louise get married as everyone and Louise's family watches them tour away on their carriage. Back at De Ornielle, Louise uses the 'World Door' to create a way to Japan for Saito, where he shows her all the wonderful things from his world. The last scene shows Saito and Louise standing in front of his house to where he is about to introduce Louise to his family.
