= Konami Cross Media NY =

American production company

Konami Cross Media NY, Inc.
- Formerly: 4Kids Productions (1992–2012); 4K Media Inc. (2012–2019)
- Type: Subsidiary
- Industry: Television production
- Founded: November 1992; 34 years ago
- Headquarters: New York City, United States
- Area served: Worldwide
- Key people: Kristen Gray (president); Jennifer Coleman (vice president, Licensing & Marketing)
- Products: Animated television series Anime
- Parent: 4Kids Entertainment (1992–2012); Konami (2012–present)
- Website: www.yugioh.com www.konami.com/crossmedia/us/en/

Konami Cross Media NY, Inc. is an American production company owned by Konami.

Cross Media was founded in November 1992 as 4Kids Productions, a subsidiary of 4Kids Entertainment (which later became 4Licensing Corporation). After 4Kids was dissolved on June 30, 2012, due to a continued lack of profitability, their production office would be acquired by Konami and renamed 4K Media later that year. On April 1, 2019, the company adapted its current name; reflecting its expansion to manage Konami brands outside of video games. In addition to the localization and license management of intellectual property (IP), Konami Cross Media NY produces and develops new businesses using Konami-owned IP.

Konami Cross Media NY is responsible for producing edited English-language adaptations of Japanese anime series, primarily of the Yu-Gi-Oh! franchise. In addition to overseeing the licensing, sales, and distribution of Yu-Gi-Oh! in the United States, Cross Media also manages Konami's gaming properties (including Bomberman, Contra and Frogger; as well as Rebecca Bonbon, the girl's anime brand created by Yuko Shimuzu).

4K Media Inc. logo used 2012 to 2019

== Filmography ==
=== As 4Kids Productions ===
==== Television ====
Title	Year(s)	Network	Co-production(s)	Notes
WMAC Masters	1995–1997	Syndication	Renaissance Atlantic Entertainment	Syndicated by The Summit Media Group
Pokémon	1998–2006	Syndication (season 1); The WB	The Pokémon Company; OLM, Inc.	Seasons 1–8 only Syndicated by The Summit Media Group for season 1 only
Cubix: Robots for Everyone	2001–2003	The WB	Cinepix; Daewon Media	English version only
Tama and Friends	2001–2002	Syndication	Sony Creative Products; Group TAC	Syndicated by The Summit Media Group
Yu-Gi-Oh!	2001–2006	The WB	Konami; Gallop	
Ultraman Tiga	2002–2003	Fox	Tsuburaya Productions	
Kirby: Right Back at Ya!	2002–2009	Fox (seasons 1–4); The CW (season 4, later episodes)	Warpstar, Inc. Studio Sign	
Ultimate Muscle	2002–2004	Fox	Toei Animation	
Fighting Foodons	2002–2003	Fox	Enoki Films	
Teenage Mutant Ninja Turtles	2003–2009	Fox (seasons 1–6); The CW (season 7)	Mirage Studios	
Sonic X	2003–2006	Fox	Sonic Team; TMS Entertainment	
Shaman King	2003–2005	Fox	Xebec	
Funky Cops	2003–2004	Fox	MoonScoop	
Winx Club	2004–2007	Fox	Rainbow S.r.l.	Seasons 1–3 only
F-Zero: GP Legend	2004–2005	Fox	Nintendo; Ashi Productions	First 15 episodes only
One Piece	2004–2007	Fox; Cartoon Network	Toei Animation	Seasons 1–5 only
Mew Mew Power	2005–2006	Fox	Pierrot	Season 1 only
Yu-Gi-Oh! GX	2005–2008	Fox; Cartoon Network	Konami; Gallop	
Pokémon Chronicles	2005–2006	Cartoon Network	The Pokémon Company; OLM, Inc.	
Magical DoReMi	2005–2006	Fox	Toei Animation	Season 1 only
G.I. Joe: Sigma 6	2005–2006	Fox	Gonzo	
Yu-Gi-Oh! Capsule Monsters	2006	Fox	Konami; Gallop	
Viva Piñata	2006–2009	Fox (season 1); The CW (season 2)	Microsoft; Bardel Entertainment	
Chaotic	2006–2010	Fox (seasons 1–2); The CW (seasons 2–3); Cartoon Network (season 2, later episodes)	Chaotic USA Entertainment Group; Bardel Entertainment (season 1)	
Dinosaur King	2007–2010	Fox (season 1, early episodes); The CW (seasons 1–2)	SEGA; Sunrise	
The Adrenaline Project	2007–2008	Fox	marblemedia Decode Entertainment	Season 1 only
Yu-Gi-Oh! 5D's	2008–2011	The CW	Konami; Gallop	
GoGoRiki	2008–2011	The CW	Fun Game Media; Petersburg Animation Studio	Season 1 only
Tai Chi Chasers	2011–2012	The CW	JM Animation; Toei Animation	Seasons 1–2 only
Yu-Gi-Oh! Zexal	2011–2015	The CW (seasons 1–5); Nicktoons (seasons 2–6); Hulu (seasons 5–6)	Konami; Gallop	Seasons 2–6 produced as 4K Media Inc.

==== Shorts ====
Title	Year(s)	Network/Platform	Co-production(s)	Notes
The Incredible Crash Dummies	2004–2005	Fox	Animation Collective	
Pajanimals	2008	PBS Kids Sprout	The Jim Henson Company (owner); John Doze Studios	

==== Film ====
Title	Release date	Co-production(s)	Distributor(s)
Pokémon: The First Movie	November 12, 1999	The Pokémon Company; OLM, Inc.	Warner Bros. Pictures
Pokémon: The Movie 2000	July 21, 2000	The Pokémon Company; OLM, Inc.	Warner Bros. Pictures
Pokémon 3: The Movie	April 6, 2001	The Pokémon Company; OLM, Inc.	Warner Bros. Pictures
Pokémon 4Ever	October 11, 2002	The Pokémon Company; OLM, Inc.	Miramax Films
Pokémon Heroes	May 16, 2003	The Pokémon Company; OLM, Inc.	Miramax Films
Pokémon: Jirachi Wish Maker	June 1, 2004	The Pokémon Company; OLM, Inc.	Miramax Films
Yu-Gi-Oh! The Movie: Pyramid of Light	August 13, 2004	Konami; Gallop	Warner Bros. Pictures
Pokémon: Destiny Deoxys	January 22, 2005	The Pokémon Company; OLM, Inc.	Miramax Films
Kirby: Fright to the Finish!	June 14, 2005 (direct-to-video); September 12, 2009 (television)	Warpstar, Inc. Studio Sign	Funimation Entertainment
Pokémon: Lucario and the Mystery of Mew	September 19, 2006	The Pokémon Company; OLM, Inc.	Viz Media
Teenage Mutant Ninja Turtles: Turtles Forever	November 21, 2009	Mirage Studios	Paramount Home Entertainment
Yu-Gi-Oh!: Bonds Beyond Time	February 26, 2011	Konami; Gallop	Cinedigm

==== Video games ====
- Pokémon Puzzle League (2000)
- Teenage Mutant Ninja Turtles (2003)
- Teenage Mutant Ninja Turtles 2: Battle Nexus (2004)
- Teenage Mutant Ninja Turtles: Mutant Melee (2005)
- Teenage Mutant Ninja Turtles 3: Mutant Nightmare (2005)
- Sonic the Hedgehog (2005–2010)
- Sonic & Sega All-Stars Racing / With Banjo-Kazooie (2010)

=== As 4K Media Inc./Konami Cross Media NY ===
==== Television ====
Title	Year(s)	Network	Co-production(s)	Notes
Yu-Gi-Oh! Arc-V	2015–2018	Nicktoons	Konami; Gallop	
Yu-Gi-Oh! VRAINS	2018–2021	Pluto TV	Konami; Gallop	
Frogger	2021	Peacock		
Yu-Gi-Oh! Sevens	2022–2023	Disney XD; Hulu	Konami; Bridge	
Yu-Gi-Oh! Go Rush!!	2025–present	Disney XD; Hulu	Konami; Bridge	

==== Film ====
Title	Release date	Co-production(s)	Distributor(s)
Yu-Gi-Oh! The Dark Side of Dimensions	January 27, 2017	Gallop	Eleven Arts

==== Video games ====
- Frogger: Get Hoppin (2017)
- Frogger In Toy Town (2019)
- Contra: Rogue Corps (2019)
- Yu-Gi-Oh! Rush Duel: Dawn of the Battle Royale!! (2021)
- Frogger and the Rumbling Ruins (2022)

== See also ==
- Konami
- List of 4Kids Entertainment licenses and productions
