= Joe Lizura =

American television meteorologist (born 1961)

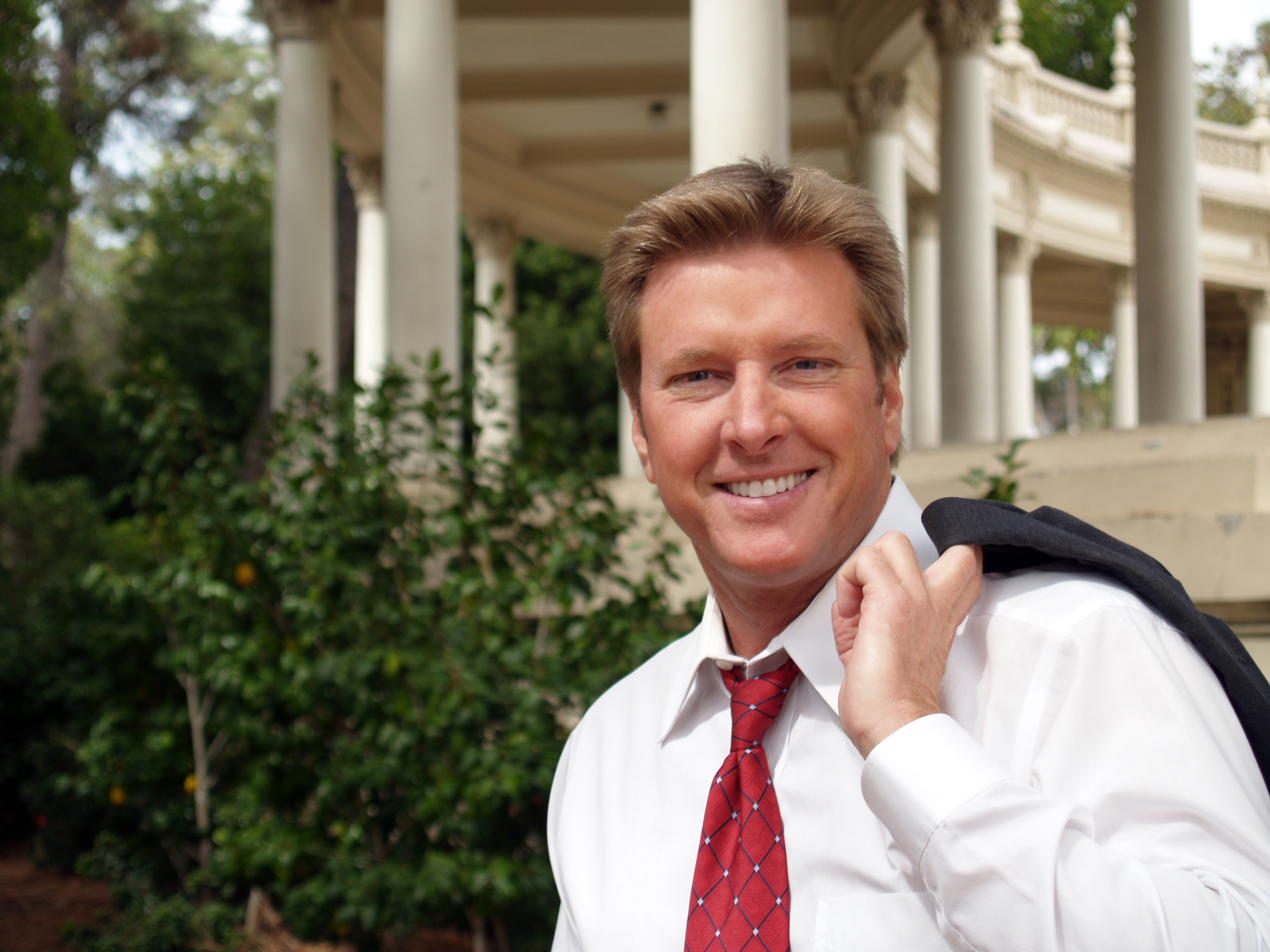
- Lizura in San Diego 2012
- Born: April 4, 1961 (age 65); Perth Amboy, New Jersey, U.S.
- Education: Rutgers University (BS, BA)
- Occupations: TV meteorologist, author, actor
- Years active: 1985–present
- Website: www.joelizura.com

Joe Lizura (born Joseph Raymond Lizura, April 4, 1961) is an American television meteorologist as well as an actor, spokesperson, author and television show developer, writer and producer. He is best known for his 17-year broadcasting tenure as a meteorologist for KNSD-TV the NBC owned and operated television station in San Diego, California. Joe Lizura holds an American Meteorological Society Seal of Approval, #384 and began his television career as a weekend weathercaster at WANE-TV in Fort Wayne, Indiana in 1984. In 2007 Lizura began producing television shows and children's DVDs and CDs. He has written or co-written 6 full length kids’ DVDs of the band,The Jumpitz as well as 28 television episodes of the award-winning bilingual television series Dos y Dos. In 2012, Joe Lizura wrote and published a book designed to help organizations in their quest for television promotion, entitled Television Promotion: How to Get Yourself, Your Business, or Your Organization Promoted on TV.

== Early years ==
Joe Lizura was born in Perth Amboy, New Jersey in 1961 and was raised in Piscataway, New Jersey. His elementary school years were spent at both Grandview Elementary School and Our Lady of Fatima Elementary School. His middle schools years were spent at Schor Middle School, and his high school years were spent at Piscataway High School where he graduated in 1979.

Lizura enrolled in Rutgers University in 1979 as a double major. In 1984, Lizura received a Bachelor of Science degree in Atmospheric and Oceanic Science as well as a Bachelor of Arts degree in Communication and Human Relations.

== Life and career ==
In February 1985, Lizura began his broadcasting career as a weekend weathercaster at the CBS affiliated WANE-TV in Fort Wayne, Indiana. Six months later, in the summer of 1985, Lizura began as the weekday evening weathercaster for WLOX-TV, the ABC affiliate in Biloxi, Mississippi where he subsequently spent the next two years. While in Biloxi, Lizura was awarded the Mississippi Associated Press "Best Weathercaster" (1986) for outstanding broadcasting. In 1987, he moved from Biloxi, Mississippi to Sacramento, California and became the weekday morning weathercaster for the NBC affiliated KCRA-TV where he spent the next two years working on-air, public speaking, and assisting the Clean Air Partnership for the state of California.

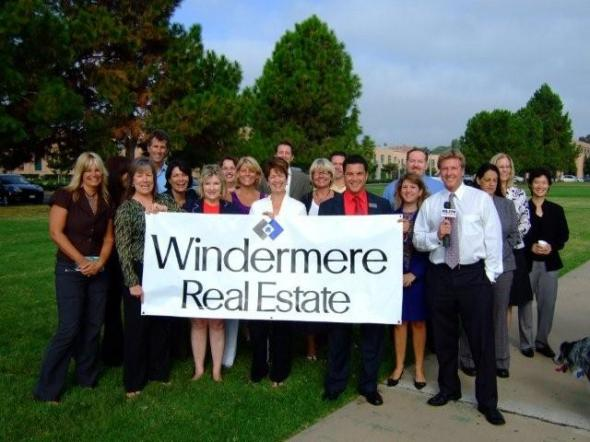
Joe Lizura Live Shot August 2009

In June 1988, Lizura left KCRA and moved to Cincinnati, Ohio where he became the weekend weathercaster for WLWT-TV, the NBC affiliate, working alongside Jerry Springer who was the primary news anchor at that time. 12 months later, in 1989, Lizura was offered a weathercaster position in San Diego, California with NBC affiliate KNSD-TV, which became the NBC owned and operated television station in 1996. Lizura worked on-air with KNSD-TV from 1989 to 2006. In 2007, Joe Lizura began working as the morning weathercaster for KUSI-TV, the independent television station in San Diego (2007–2011).

While working as a television Weathercaster in San Diego, Lizura became interested in developing and producing television shows. During this time, Lizura was the head of three television show development companies: The Jumpitz Corporation (2007–2008), Latin American Multimedia Corporation (2008–2011), and the Allowance Media Group, Inc (2011–present). In 2007 and 2008 Lizura wrote and produced four full-length DVDs under "The Jumpitz" and "Los Jumpitz" label. From 2008 - 2011, while presiding as CEO of The Latin American Multimedia Corporation, Lizura co-wrote and produced 26 Television episodes of Dos y Dos, a children's educational Spanish/English bilingual show.

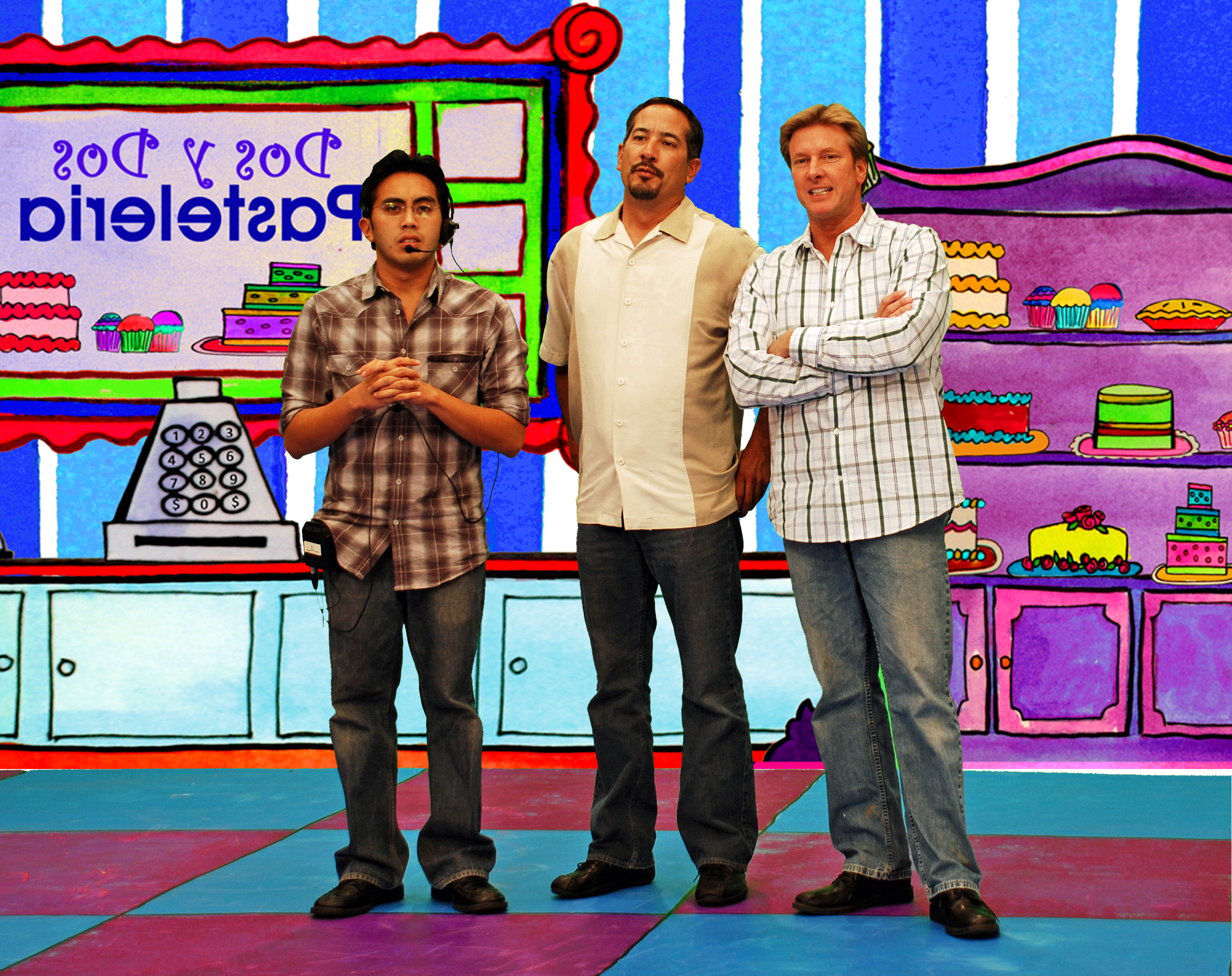
Joe Lizura on the set of Dos y Dos

"Dos y Dos" episodes can be seen airing in the U.S. on the Sorpresa and the LATV networks. "Dos y Dos" aired internationally on Telemundo in Puerto Rico, ATB network in Bolivia, Panamericana TV in Peru, and Ecuavisa in Ecuador. In 2011, he founded Allowance Media Group to develop six new television pilots into production. In 2013, Joe Lizura took on the responsibility of Executive Director for The Solar Alliance Foundation based in San Diego.

Joe Lizura is listed with BMI (Broadcast Music Incorporated) as a co-composer/co-songwriter for 146 songs. Lizura was a voting member of the National Academy of Recording Arts and Sciences (Grammys) from 2010 to 2011.

Lizura has been active in supporting charitable groups and started "The Joe Lizura Charity Golf Classic" which raised $1,000,000 to benefit Rady Children's Hospital in San Diego (2002–2005). He has also supported the MS Society as Honorary Chairperson for the MS WALK from 1992 - 2005. In June 2002, Joe Lizura was selected as the San Diego National Multiple Sclerosis Society's 2002 volunteer of the year.

In January 2011, Lizura faced a misdemeanor charge of engaging in lewd conduct in public, as well as a misdemeanor count of indecent exposure, after two independent witnesses allegedly saw him deliberately exposed and masturbating in the window of a San Diego office building. Lizura plead guilty to the lewd conduct charge and was placed on three years' probation. He was also ordered to pay a $200 fine, and to attend a counseling session.

=== Credits ===
Full Length Children's DVDs

- The Jumpitz "Going Groovy" (2007) (English) (Creator, Writer, Producer)
- Los Jumpitz "Going Groovy" (2007) (Spanish) (Creator, Co-writer, Producer)
- The Jumpitz "The Imagination Box" (2008) (English) (Creator, Writer, Producer)
- Los Jumpitz "La Caja De Imagination" (2008) (Spanish) (Creator, Co-writer, Producer)

2009 - 2011

Dos y Dos season 1 (2009–2010)

- Animales (2009) - Writer (creator), executive producer
- Buenos modales (2009) - Writer (creator), executive producer
- Cinco sentidos (2009) - Writer (creator), executive producer
- Colores (2009) - Writer (creator), executive producer
- Cosas pequeñas (2009) - Writer (creator), executive producer
- Cosas differentes (2009) - Writer (creator), executive producer
- Crecer y aprender (2009) - Writer (creator), executive producer
- Cuando sea grande (2009) - Writer (creator), executive producer
- Deportes (2009) - Writer (creator), executive producer
- El estado del tiempo (2009) - Writer (creator), executive producer
- Emociones (2009) - Writer (creator), executive producer
- Estaciones del año (2009) - Writer (creator), executive producer
- Feliz cumpleanos foto Joe! (2009) - Writer (creator), executive producer

Dos y Dos season 2 (2010–2011)

- Formas geometricas (2010) - Writer (creator), executive producer
- Frutas y vegetales (2010) - Writer (creator), executive producer
- Gente de todo el mundo (2010) - Writer (creator), executive producer
- Gente que conocemos (2010) - Writer (creator), executive producer
- Inventos (2010) - Writer (creator), executive producer
- Las horas del día (2010) - Writer (creator), executive producer
- Mis cosas favoritas (2010) - Writer (creator), executive producer
- Musica (2010) - Writer (creator), executive producer
- Nuestra aventura acampando (2010) - Writer (creator), executive producer
- Numeros (2010) - Writer (creator), executive producer
- Obras de arte (2010) - Writer (creator), executive producer
- Siguiendo direcciones (2010) - Writer (creator), executive producer
- Transportación (2010) - Writer (creator), executive producer
