= Jonathan Meza =

American voice actor (born 1983)

- Born: 30 March 1983 (age 42); Los Angeles, California, U.S.
- Occupation: Voice actor
- Agent: Komashko Talent Agency

Jonathan Meza (born March 30, 1983) is an American voice actor who frequently works with dubbing studio Bang Zoom! Entertainment. He has starred in several anime: his greatest role is Saito Hiraga in The Familiar of Zero. Additionally, he is also known as the voice of Zafira from Nanoha A's, the sequel to the original Nanoha series. Meza is more prominently known for his appearances as the host on AnimeTV and Otaku Movie Anatomy.

As an actor, Meza is known for the popular kids' show, The Jumpitz which had a successful spot on Nickelodeon for a while and had many tours around the world.

He is also well known for his role as Muddles from the panto A Snow White Christmas, a Lythgoe production.

== Filmography ==
=== Anime ===
- 5 Centimeters Per Second - Teammate
- The Familiar of Zero - Saito Hiraga; Osmand
- Magical Girl Lyrical Nanoha - Bardiche
- Magical Girl Lyrical Nanoha A's - Bardiche; Zafira
- Redline - Additional Voices
- Squid Girl - Martin; Devil Squid
