= The Jumpitz =

American children's music group

- The Jumpitz in 2010

Background information
- Origin: San Diego, California, U.S.
- Years active: 2007–2010
- Past members: Adam Daniel; Christina Caster; Jason Mallery; Jonathan Meza; Olivia Espinosa
- Website: jumpitz.com

The Jumpitz (2007–2010) was a performance group for pre-school aged children based in San Diego, California.

== History ==
The Jumpitz was a children's performance group from San Diego for two to seven year olds. It consists of five characters: Emily, Jake, Josh, Nathan, and Mari. Adam Daniel auditioned and played the role of Jake. Originally only a group of four, Jason Mallery joined the group later on.

In 2009, The Jumpitz did a ten week Summer Health Festival tour to multiple shopping centers and Dubai Mall. They toured for KidsFaire to Cardinals Stadium, Alameda County Fairgrounds and Orange County Fairgrounds. The group performed at Legoland California and on the USS Midway with The Boo Crew, where they were broadcast on the Pentagon Channel.

In 2010, The Jumptiz performed a children's benefit event at Pixieland in Concord, California. The group's products were distributed by Tech Access Media Solutions to Asia, the Middle East, and North Africa.

== Members ==
- Adam Daniel
- Christina Caster
- Jason Mallery
- Jonathan Meza
- Olivia Espinosa

== Discography ==
- Celebrate Animals! (2009)
- Jumpitz Jukebox: Jump to It! (2009)
- Jumpitz Jukebox: Finding Fun! (2009)

== Legal case ==
On August 13, 2010, Jumpitz Corporation filed a complaint against Viacom International for MTV's "The JumpArounds."
