= List of digital collectible card games =

Video game list

This is a list of video games with mechanics based on collectible card games. It includes games which directly simulate collectible card games (often called digital collectible card games), arcade games integrated with physical collectible card games, and video games in other genres which utilize elements of deck-building or card battling as a significant portion of their game mechanics. It does not include games which only feature card collecting or card battling as a minigame, nor does it include games which simulate traditional card games such as solitaire or poker.

== Legend ==
Video game platforms
3DS	Nintendo 3DS, 3DS Virtual Console, iQue 3DS	Arcade	Arcade video game	DC	Dreamcast
DROID	Android	DS	Nintendo DS, DSiWare, iQue DS	GBA	Game Boy Advance, iQue GBA
GBC	Game Boy Color	GCN	GameCube	iOS	iOS, iPhone, iPod, iPadOS, iPad, visionOS, Apple Vision Pro
LIN	Linux, SteamOS	MAC	Classic Mac OS, 2001 and before	MOBI	Mobile phone
NES	Nintendo Entertainment System / Famicom	OSX	macOS	NGPC	Neo Geo Pocket Color
NX	(replace with NS)	PS1	PlayStation 1	PS2	PlayStation 2
PS3	PlayStation 3	PS4	PlayStation 4	PS5	PlayStation 5
PSP	PlayStation Portable	PSV	PlayStation Vita	SAT	Sega Saturn
SNES	Super NES / Super Famicom / Super Comboy	WEB	Browser game	Wii	Wii, WiiWare, Wii Virtual Console
WiiU	Wii U, WiiU Virtual Console	WIN	Windows, all versions Windows 95 and up	WS	WonderSwan
X360	(replace with XB360)	XBOX	(replace with XB)	XBLA	Term not found
XOne	(replace with XBO)	XSX/S	(replace with XBX/S)		

== List of games ==
Year (Note: Year of initial release, regardless of region)	Game	Developer	Series (Note: Standalone properties not associated with any other media are denoted with —)	Platform	Notes
1989	Dragon Ball: Daimaō Fukkatsu	Bandai	Dragon Ball	NES	
1992	Arcana	HAL Laboratory	—	SNES	
1992	Dragon Ball Z: Gekitō Tenkaichi Budokai	Bandai	Dragon Ball	NES	Utilizes Datach Joint Rom System card reader attachment to select characters
1993	Dragon Ball Z Side Story: Plan to Eradicate the Saiyans	Tose	Dragon Ball	NES	
1997	Chron X	Genetic Anomalies	—	WIN	
1997	Culdcept	OmiyaSoft	Culdcept	DS, PS1, PS2, PS3, PSP, SAT	
1997	Magic: The Gathering	MicroProse	Magic: The Gathering	WIN	No multiplayer component
1997	Magic: The Gathering: BattleMage	Acclaim Entertainment	Magic: The Gathering	PS1, WIN	
1998	Pokémon Trading Card Game	Hudson Soft, Creatures	Pokémon	3DS, GBC	Based on the Pokémon Trading Card Game
1998	Sanctum	Digital Addiction	—	WIN	Servers taken over by fan organization Nioga in 2000, and were shut down in 2010
1998	Yu-Gi-Oh!		Yu-Gi-Oh!		Based on the Yu-Gi-Oh! Trading Card Game. Since 1998, 56 video games based on the franchise have been released across numerous platforms.
1999	Monster Rancher Battle Card Game	GRC	Monster Rancher	GBC	
1999	SNK vs. Capcom: Card Fighters' Clash	SNK	SNK vs. Capcom	NGPC	
1999	Tekken Card Challenge	Namco	Tekken	WS	
2000	Digimon Digital Card Battle	Bandai Entertainment Company	Digimon	PS1	Based on the Digimon Collectible Card Game
2000	Trade & Battle: Card Hero	Nintendo R&D1, Intelligent Systems	Card Hero	3DS, GBC	
2001	Culdcept Second	OmiyaSoft	Culdcept	DC	
2001	Gensō Suikoden Card Stories	Will	Suikoden	GBA	
2001	Magi Nation	Interactive Imagination	Magi-Nation Duel	GBC	Based on Magi-Nation Duel
2001	Magic: The Gathering	Sega	Magic: The Gathering	DC	Japan-only release
2001	Pokémon Card GB2: Here Comes Team Great Rocket!	Hudson Soft, Creatures	Pokémon	GBC	Based on the Pokémon Trading Card Game
2001	SNK vs. Capcom: Card Fighters 2 Expand Edition	SNK	SNK vs. Capcom	NGPC	
2001	WWF With Authority!	Genetic Anomalies	World Wrestling Entertainment	WIN	Originally released as WWF With Authority!, the game's title was changed after the WWF name dispute
2002	Dragon Ball Z: Collectible Card Game	Atari	Dragon Ball	GBA	Based on the Dragon Ball Z Collectible Card Game
2002	Dragon Ball Z: Legendary Super Warriors	Banpresto	Dragon Ball	GBC	
2002	Lost Kingdoms	FromSoftware	Lost Kingdoms	GCN	
2002	Magic: The Gathering Online	Leaping Lizard Software, Wizards of the Coast	Magic: The Gathering	WIN	
2002	World Club Champion Football	Hitmaker, Sega	—	Arcade	Arcade game integrated with physical collectible card game. Since its debut in 2002, it has sold over 850 million player cards, making it one of the best-selling arcade digital collectible card games.
2002	X: Card of Fate	Access Software	X	WS	
2003	Azumanga Daioh Advance	King Records	Azumanga Daioh	GBA	
2003	Baten Kaitos: Eternal Wings and the Lost Ocean	Monolith Soft, tri-Crescendo	Baten Kaitos	GCN	
2003	Duel Masters		Duel Masters		Since 2003, video games based on the franchise have been released across numerous platforms.
2003	Lost Kingdoms II	FromSoftware	Lost Kingdoms	GCN	
2003	Mega Man Battle Chip Challenge	Inti Creates, Capcom Production Studio 2	Mega Man Battle Network	GBA, WiiU, WS	
2003	Mushiking: The King of Beetles	Sega	Mushiking: The King of Beetles	Arcade	Arcade game integrated with physical collectible card game. Holds the Guinness World Record for most tournaments held for a single arcade game.
2003	Phantasy Star Online Episode III: C.A.R.D. Revolution	Sonic Team	Phantasy Star	GCN	Official servers discontinued in April 2007
2003	Star Chamber: The Harbinger Saga	Nayantara Studios	—	MAC, WIN	Official servers discontinued in March 2012
2004	Alteil	Dex Entertainment	—	WEB	
2004	Kingdom Hearts: Chain of Memories	Square Enix, Jupiter	Kingdom Hearts	GBA, PS2	
2004	Love and Berry: Dress Up and Dance!	Sega	—	Arcade, DS	Arcade game integrated with physical collectible card game
2004	Metal Gear Acid	Konami Computer Entertainment Japan	Metal Gear	MOBI, PSP	
2004	Phantom Dust	Microsoft Game Studios, Code Mystics	—	WIN, Xbox, XOne	
2005	Dinosaur King	Sega	Dinosaur King	Arcade	Arcade game integrated with physical collectible card game
2005	Data Carddass Dragon Ball Z	Bandai	Dragon Ball	Arcade	Data Carddass arcade game integrated with physical collectible card game
2005	Konjiki no Gashbell!! The Card Battle for GBA	Banpresto	Zatch Bell!	GBA	Based on Zatch Bell! The Card Battle
2005	Metal Gear Acid 2	Kojima Productions	Metal Gear	MOBI, PSP	
2005	Sangokushi Taisen	Sega AM1, Shade	—	Arcade	Arcade game integrated with physical collectible card game. Based on the Chinese novel Romance of the Three Kingdoms.
2006	Baten Kaitos Origins	Monolith Soft, tri-Crescendo	Baten Kaitos	GCN	
2006	Culdcept Saga	OmiyaSoft	Culdcept	X360	
2006	Final Fantasy Fables: Chocobo Tales	h.a.n.d.	Chocobo series	DS	
2006	Kirarin Revolution	Atlus	Kirarin Revolution	Arcade	Arcade game integrated with physical collectible card game
2006	Mega Man Star Force	Capcom	Mega Man Star Force	DS	Released in three versions, Leo, Pegasus, and Dragon
2006	PoxNora	Octopi Media Design Lab, Sony Online Entertainment, Desert Owl Games	—	WEB, PS4, PSV	
2006	SNK vs. Capcom: Card Fighters DS	SNK	SNK vs. Capcom	DS	
2006	Urban Rivals	Acute Games	—	WEB, DROID, iOS, WIN	
2006	Warhammer: Battle for Atluma	JV Games	Warhammer Fantasy	PSP	Based on the WarCry trading card game
2006	Yggdra Union	Sting Entertainment	Dept. Heaven	GBA, PSP	
2007	Chaotic Online	4Kids Entertainment, TC Digital Games, Chaotic USA	Chaotic	MAC, WIN	Based on the Chaotic Trading Card Game
2007	Dinosaur King	Climax Entertainment	Dinosaur King	DS	
2007	Dragon Ball Z: Harukanaru Densetsu	Bandai Entertainment Company	Dragon Ball	DS	
2007	Dragon Quest: Monster Battle Road	Rocket Studio, Eighting	Dragon Quest	Arcade	Arcade game integrated with physical collectible card game
2007	The Eye of Judgment	Japan Studio	The Eye of Judgment	PS3	Utilizes the PlayStation Eye camera peripheral to read physical cards. Official servers discontinued in September 2010.
2007	Fullmetal Alchemist Trading Card Game	Destineer	Fullmetal Alchemist	DS	Based on the Fullmetal Alchemist Trading Card Game first published by Joyride Entertainment in 2005
2007	Kousoku Card Battle: Card Hero	Nintendo SPD, Intelligent Systems	Card Hero	DS	Spiritual successor to Trade & Battle: Card Hero
2007	Legends of Norrath	Sony Online Entertainment	EverQuest	MAC, WIN	
2007	Marvel Trading Card Game	Vicious Cycle Software, 1st Playable Productions, Engine Software	Marvel Comics	DS, PSP, WIN	Based on the Marvel Trading Card Game published by Upper Deck Entertainment
2007	Mega Man Star Force 2	Capcom	Mega Man Star Force	DS	Released in two versions, Zerker × Saurian and Zerker × Ninja
2007	PreCure All Stars Data Carddass	Bandai	Pretty Cure	Arcade	Data Carddass arcade game integrated with physical collectible card game
2008	Kamen Rider Battle: Ganbaride	Bandai	Kamen Rider	Arcade	Data Carddass arcade game integrated with physical collectible card game
2008	Lord of Vermilion	Think Garage	Lord of Vermilion	Arcade	Arcade game integrated with physical collectible card game
2008	Mega Man Star Force 3	Capcom	Mega Man Star Force	DS	Released in two versions, Black Ace and Red Joker
2008	Saga	Silverlode Interactive	—	WIN	
2009	Bakugan Battle Brawlers	NOW Production	Bakugan Battle Brawlers	DS, PS2, PS3, Wii, X360	
2009	Jewelpet: The Glittering Magical Jewel Box	Sega	Jewelpet	Arcade	Arcade game integrated with physical collectible card game
2009	Magic: The Gathering – Duels of the Planeswalkers	Stainless Games	Magic: The Gathering	PS3, WIN, XBLA	
2010	Apron of Magic	Examu, VERVE, Bergsala Lightweight AB	Sanrio company	Arcade, iOS	Arcade game integrated with physical collectible card game
2010	Bakugan Battle Brawlers: Arcade Battler	Sega	Bakugan Battle Brawlers	Arcade	Arcade game integrated with physical collectible card game
2010	Dragon Ball Heroes	Bandai	Dragon Ball	Arcade	Arcade game integrated with physical collectible card game. By May 2016, the game had sold 400 million cards and grossed over ¥40 billion ($365 million).
2010	The Eye of Judgment: Legends	Japan Studio	The Eye of Judgment	PSP	Unlike the original PS3 game, Legends uses a completely virtual card system. Official servers discontinued August 2012.
2010	Kamen Rider Battle: Ganbaride: Card Battle War	Bandai	Kamen Rider	Arcade	Port of Kamen Rider Battle: Ganbaride arcade game, but without physical cards
2011	Ascension: Chronicle of the Godslayer	Playdek	—	DROID, iOS	Available in both digital and physical formats
2011	Cabals: Magic & Battle Cards	Kyy Games	—	WEB, MAC, MOBI, WIN	
2011	Card no Renketsu Densha de Go!	Taito, Square Enix	Densha de Go!	Arcade	Arcade game integrated with physical collectible card game
2011	Magic: The Gathering – Tactics	Sony Online Entertainment	Magic: The Gathering	WIN	Official servers discontinued in March 2014
2011	Magic: The Gathering – Duels of the Planeswalkers 2012	Stainless Games	Magic: The Gathering	PS3, WIN, XBLA	
2011	Mobile Suit Gundam: Try Age	Bandai	Mobile Suit Gundam	Arcade	Arcade game integrated with physical collectible card game
2011	Pokémon TCG Online	Dire Wolf Digital	Pokémon	WEB, DROID, iOS, MAC, WIN	Based on the Pokémon Trading Card Game
2011	Rage of Bahamut	Cygames	Rage of Bahamut	WEB, DROID, iOS	
2011	Shadow Era	Wulven Studios	—	DROID, iOS, MAC, WIN	Available in both digital and physical formats
2012	Aikatsu!	Bandai	Aikatsu!	Arcade	Data Carddass arcade game integrated with physical collectible card game
2012	Chōsoku Henkei Gyrozetter	Square Enix	Chōsoku Henkei Gyrozetter	Arcade	Arcade game integrated with physical collectible card game
2012	Culdcept 3DS	OmiyaSoft	Culdcept	3DS	
2012	Endgame: Syria	GameTheNews	—	WEB, DROID	
2012	Ensemble Girls!	Happy Elements K. K.	Ensemble Girls	WEB, DROID, iOS	
2012	Kaku-San-Sei Million Arthur	Square Enix	Million Arthur	DROID, iOS	
2012	Magic: The Gathering – Duels of the Planeswalkers 2013	Stainless Games	Magic: The Gathering	iOS, PS3, WIN, XBLA	
2012	Monster Retsuden Oreca Battle	Konami	—	Arcade	Arcade game integrated with physical collectible card game
2013	Card Hunter	Blue Manchu	—	WEB, MAC, WIN	
2013	Dragon Ball Heroes: Ultimate Mission	Bandai	Dragon Ball	3DS	Port of Dragon Ball Heroes arcade game, but without physical cards
2013	Hello Kitty's Magic Apron	Bergsala Lightweight AB	Sanrio company	3DS	
2013	K-On! Hōkago Rhythm Time	Atlus	K-On!	Arcade	Arcade game integrated with physical collectible card game
2013	Magic: The Gathering – Duels of the Planeswalkers 2014	Stainless Games	Magic: The Gathering	DROID, iOS, PS3, WIN, XBLA	
2013	Chōsoku Henkei Gyrozetter Arubarosu Wings	Square Enix	Chōsoku Henkei Gyrozetter	3DS	Port of Chōsoku Henkei Gyrozetter arcade game, but without physical cards
2014	Ange Vierge: The Second Disciplinary Committee Girls Battle	Sega	Ange Vierge	DROID, iOS	Development discontinued May 2017
2014	Dragon Ball Heroes: Ultimate Mission 2	Bandai	Dragon Ball	3DS	
2014	Hearthstone	Blizzard Entertainment	Warcraft	DROID, iOS, MAC, WIN	
2014	K-On! Hōkago Rhythm Selection	Sega	K-On!	Arcade	Arcade game integrated with physical collectible card game
2014	Kai-Ri-Sei Million Arthur	Square Enix	Million Arthur	DROID, iOS	
2014	Magic: The Gathering – Duels of the Planeswalkers 2015	Stainless Games, Wizards of the Coast	Magic: The Gathering	DROID, iOS, WIN, XBLA, XOne	
2014	Infinity Wars	Lightmare Studios		WIN	
2015	Hand of Fate	Defiant Development	Hand of Fate	LIN, MAC, PS4, WIN, XOne	
2015	Magic Duels	Stainless Games	Magic: The Gathering	iOS, WIN, XOne	Removed from storefronts and purchases disabled November 2019, but remains playable
2015	Tabletop Simulator	Berserk Games	—	LIN, MAC, WIN	Simulates tabletop games, including card games, in a multiplayer physics sandbox
2016	Culdcept Revolt	OmiyaSoft	Culdcept	3DS	
2016	Duelyst	Counterplay Games	—	WIN	Official servers discontinued in February 2020
2016	Eternal	Dire Wolf Digital	—	DROID, iOS, NX, WIN, XOne	
2016	Forced: Showdown	BetaDwarf	—	LIN, MAC, WIN	
2016	Hex: Shards of Fate	Cryptozoic Entertainment	—	MAC, WIN, PS4	
2016	KanColle Arcade	Sega AM2	Kantai Collection	Arcade	Arcade game integrated with physical collectible card game
2016	Plants vs. Zombies Heroes	PopCap Games	Plants vs. Zombies	DROID, iOS	
2016	Shadowverse	Cygames	Shadowverse	DROID, iOS	
2016	SolForge	Stone Blade Entertainment	—	DROID, iOS, LIN, MAC, WIN	Official servers discontinued in 2017.
2017	Dragon Ball Heroes: Ultimate Mission X	Bandai	Dragon Ball	3DS	
2017	The Elder Scrolls: Legends	Dire Wolf Digital, Sparkypants Studios	The Elder Scrolls	DROID, iOS, MAC, WIN	Development halted in December 2019, but servers remain accessible
2017	Faeria	Abrakam	—	LIN, MAC, WIN	
2017	South Park: Phone Destroyer	RedLynx	South Park	DROID, iOS	
2017	Mythgard	Rhino Games	—	WIN	
2018	Artifact	Valve	Dota	LIN, MAC, WIN	
2018	Caller's Bane	Mojang	—	DROID, MAC, WIN	Originally named Scrolls
2018	Fable Fortune	Flaming Fowl Studios, Mediatonic	Fable	WIN, XOne	
2018	Gwent: The Witcher Card Game	CD Projekt Red	The Witcher	PS4, WIN, XOne	
2018	Deep Sky Derelicts	Snowhound Games	Fulqrum Publishing	WIN, LIN, MAC, NX, PS4, XOne	
2019	SteamWorld Quest	Image & Form	SteamWorld	NX, WIN, MAC, LIN	
2019	Teppen	GungHo Online Entertainment, Capcom	—	DROID, iOS	Originally named Project Battle.
2019	Magic: The Gathering Arena	Wizards Digital Games Studio	Magic: The Gathering	DROID, iOS, MAC, WIN	
2019	Super Dragon Ball Heroes: World Mission	Bandai	Dragon Ball	NX, WIN	Includes cards and characters from the first eight Super Dragon Ball Heroes arcade games and the first two versions of Super Dragon Ball Heroes: Universe Mission.
2020	Kards	1939 Games	—	WIN	WW2-themed digital collectible card game
2020	Legends of Runeterra	Riot Games	League of Legends	DROID, iOS, WIN	
2021	Doctor Who: Worlds Apart	Reality Gaming Group	Doctor Who	WIN, MOBI	
2022	Marvel Snap	Second Dinner	MARVEL	DROID, iOS, WIN	
2022	Magic Spellslingers	Pipeworks Studios, Seismic Games	Magic: The Gathering	WIN, iOS, DROID	
2023	Cross Blitz	Tako Boy Studios	—	WIN	Role-playing video game hybrid
2024	Pokémon Trading Card Game Pocket	Creatures Inc., DeNA	Pokémon	iOS, DROID	
2024	Dragon Ball Super Card Game Fusion World	Bandai	Dragon Ball	WIN, OSX	
2025	Shadowverse: Worlds Beyond	Cygames	Shadowverse	iOS, DROID	
2025	Trickcal: Chibi Go	Epid Games	—	iOS, DROID	
2026	Wikigacha	Harusugi	—	WEB	Browser-based gacha game based on Wikipedia

== See also ==
- List of collectible card games
- Lists of video games
