= Magi-Nation =

Magi-Nation (or Magi Nation or MagiNation) may refer to:

- Magi-Nation Duel a card game released August 2000
- Magi Nation (video game) a video game adaptation released March 2001
- Magi-Nation (TV series) a cartoon with 52 episodes released from 2007
