= With Authority! =

2001 video game

WWF With Authority!
- Cover art featuring The Rock, Kane, Chris Benoit, and Triple H.
- Developer: Genetic Anomalies
- Publisher: THQ/Jakks Pacific
- Platform: Windows
- Release: February 21, 2001
- Genre: Strategy
- Mode: Single-player

WWF With Authority! is a professional wrestling digital collectible card game developed by Genetic Anomalies and published by THQ and Jakks Pacific. It was officially released for Microsoft Windows on February 21, 2001, and was discontinued in January 2003 with the online servers shutting down a few months later, with official support discontinued. However, offline versions of the game still exist. It was the first WWF game released solely on home computers since 1992's WWF European Rampage Tour.

In May 2002, the game was updated and renamed to WWE With Authority!, following the WWE abandoning their trademark dispute with the World Wide Fund for Nature. Unlike other WWF interactive software releases at this time, Genetic Anomalies managed to remove most of the "WWF" references out of the gameplay and replace them with "WWE".

== Gameplay ==
There is a single-player mode, which was intended as a tutorial. The first edition tutorials were against the Mean Street Posse and narrated by Kevin Kelly, while the second edition tutorials were against Scotty 2 Hotty and narrated by Triple H. After the second edition, 3 computer opponents became available, with each opponent being a harder difficulty (X-Pac, then Triple H, and then The Big Show). The game was primarily geared towards the online multiplayer game, where as many as 1,000 people were available at any given time during the game's height. The game kept track of the player's wins, losses and draws, as well as the number of times a player has been cut off in the middle of a match. This feature was to discourage players from terminating the program to avoid taking a loss.

During official support, players could purchase virtual "Pages" and assemble them into a "Playbook". This playbook would represent the moves and abilities that your "Superstar" (wrestler) would be capable of pulling off in the ring. Most pages require "Momentum" to play. There are six different Momentum types that represent the different type of Pages that can be played. These Momentum types are called Agility, Technical, Strength, Strike, Knowledge, and Attitude. The first five of these momentum types can only be generated by momentum pages in playbooks. Attitude Momentum is a fluid resource that could be gained and lost by playing pages or utilizing a wrestler's special ability.

Wrestlers are given Momentum limits to limit which Pages Superstars have the ability to use. For example, the first edition Triple H Superstar has an Agility Momentum limit of 1. This means that the player can only utilize one Agility Momentum in their Playbook, thus limiting the player from playing Pages that have a 2 or more Agility Momentum cost. In addition, Superstars have special abilities that provide a benefit or penalty that generally increase the effectiveness of their respective movesets and/or Special Pages.

== Release ==
WWF With Authority! was first distributed as a downloadable freeware game and was available on CD in retail stores for US$5.00. The retail version came with a redemption code for a William Regal starter playbook. Players could purchase additional pre-constructed playbooks for superstars consisting of complete selections of plays for US$10.00. Booster packs were also available for US$3.00 that include an assortment of random individual pages to accentuate your existing playbooks. A certain amount of rarer cards were guaranteed in each booster.

In January 2003, THQ ceased production of the game. The server remained online for several months. The freeware client can still be downloaded from some freeware distribution sites, but the game is no longer officially supported.

In 2003, just weeks before support ceased, a peer-to-peer version of the game was released by THQ such that existing players could continue using the game with the pages they purchased. This way, players would connect though IP addresses. Eventually, the new community was named With Authority! Peer-2-Peer. This version of the game used mIRC for a chat room/server, and the original With Authority! client as before. In addition, instead of relying on old purchased pages, guide sets were released, which consisted of every page released for the game, thus giving the option to build practically any deck. The community shut down years later.

=== Expansion packs ===
==== Season One ====
- First Edition, 196 cards (February 21, 2001)

This was the first set of the game, which established the framework and environment.

- "No Way Out", 145 cards (December 12, 2001)

This expansion rounded the game out to a complete play environment.

- "WrestleMania X8", 25 cards (late March 2002)

This "mini-expansion" was on sale only for a month or two. It was developed during the show itself, with designers at the event taking notes then scrambling back to implement, code and test the set. The main theme was the inclusion of the NWO.

==== Season Two ====
- TLC, 160 cards (May 16, 2002)

The "Tables, Ladders and Chairs" expansion greatly increased the number of hardcore and illegal moves and special cards available to players. Concurrent with this set was the release of the new "Ladder Match".

- Second Edition, 250 cards (June 2002)

This set included 238 reprints from Season One and 12 Superstars. These Superstars were new versions of existing superstars, including new gameplay text. This update scheme received a mixed reaction.

- "SummerSlam 2002", 25 cards (August 2002)

Based on the results from the "X8" mini-expansion, Genetic Anomalies released "SummerSlam 2002". This set featured Shawn Michaels (returning from a four-year break from WWE) and Brock Lesnar (who captured his first WWE Championship).

- "Unforgiven", 200 cards (September 27, 2002)

This set marked the return to themes that were based more on card mechanics and less on storyline development.

- "Expansion Eight", around 150 cards (unreleased)

Preview cards of this expansion set were released in October and November 2002. Rey Mysterio and Tajiri and their trademark moves were put on sale in Limited Edition form. This set was originally scheduled for a mid-December 2002 release.

== Roster ==
- Al Snow
- Big Show (2 editions)
- Booker T
- Bradshaw
- Brock Lesnar
- Bubba Ray Dudley
- Chris Benoit (2 editions)
- Chris Jericho (3 editions)
- Christian
- D-Von Dudley
- Eddie Guerrero (2 editions)
- Edge (2 editions)
- Goldust
- Hulk Hogan (2 editions)
- Jeff Hardy
- Kane (2 editions)
- Kevin Nash
- Kurt Angle (2 editions)
- Lance Storm
- Lita (2 editions)
- Matt Hardy
- Rey Mysterio
- Ric Flair
- Rikishi
- Rob Van Dam
- Scott Hall
- Scotty 2 Hotty
- Shane McMahon
- Shawn Michaels
- Spike Dudley
- Steve Blackman
- Stone Cold
- Tajiri
- Tazz
- Test
- The Hurricane
- The Rock (2 editions)
- The Undertaker (2 editions)
- Triple H (3 editions)
- Trish Stratus
- William Regal
- X-Pac

== Reception ==
Reception

Aggregate score
Aggregator	Score
Metacritic	53/100

Review scores
Publication	Score
GameSpot	7.2/10
GameZone	2/10
IGN	6.8/10

WWF With Authority! was one of the first online collectible card games, along with Chron X, also from Genetic Anomalies. While subsequent online collectible card games have enjoyed success, including Magic: The Gathering Online, Genetic Anomalies would not survive to see the genre flourish. The game itself was met with mixed reception, as Metacritic gave it 53 out of 100.

There was also a WWF collectible card game released at about the same time entitled Raw Deal, which was considered to be a better alternative to the online version.

== See also ==
- List of licensed wrestling video games
- List of fighting games
