= Mythgard =

Digital card game

Mythgard is a digital collectible card game originally developed and published by Rhino Games, and developed by Monumental since October 2021.

== Gameplay ==
Mythgard is a turn-based 2-player digital collectible card game based on the Magic: The Gathering template. During a turn, players:

1. Draw a card.
2. (Optional) Burn a card, which shuffles the card into the deck but generates a mana crystal for the current and future turns. Each card has a color identity, which determines the color of mana that is generated when it is burned.
3. (Optional) Cast spells. To cast a spell, one must have both the correct mana crystals and sufficient total mana. If the spell is a creature, then the summoned creature may be placed in any of seven lanes. Unique to Mythgard is the lane enhancement card type, which affects a specific lane. Creatures in that lane receive bonuses. If the creature dies, the bonus remains for the next creature that occupies the lane.
4. (Optional) Once summoned, creatures can either

- Attack opposing creatures in the lanes closest to them. For the five central lanes, these are the three lanes opposite the creature. For the two lanes on the edges, there are only two possible lanes to attack. If there are no opposing creatures in those lanes, the creature may attack the player.
- Move to an adjacent lane.

The first player to reach zero life loses.

=== Deckbuilding ===
Mythgard's deckbuilding is also based on Magic: The Gathering. Players may build decks using any and all available cards. In addition to cards, Mythgard decks also include powers and paths, both of which provide extra options during gameplay. Furthermore, one's choice of path affects one's starting life total, as well as the pursuit bonus, which is the game's way of compensating the player going second.

== Development ==
Mythgard began alpha testing in 2017. Mythgard's developers Peter Hu and Paxton Mason invested a substantial amount of personal resources into making the game. However, Rhino Games lacked the resources to compete in a saturated digital CCG market, with its competitors outspending Rhino Games on both content and marketing. As such, Rhino Games was forced to call a halt to active development in September 2021. Shortly afterwards, Monumental took over the game, with the endorsement of the original developers.

The game had several expansions, including the Rings of Immortality and The Winter War.

== Reception ==
Mythgard received little notice in the mainstream gaming press, with only one critic review listed by Metacritic. Among smaller outfits that did review the game, it generally was rated strongly. High Ground Gaming criticized the game's campaign and story, but praised the competitive modes and design. The Gamer praised Mythgard and Culture of Gaming rated the game highly, praising its design, art, and gameplay.
