= Cabals: Magic & Battle Cards =

2011 digital collectible card game

- Developer: Kyy Games
- Publisher: Kyy Games
- Director: Mika Rosendahl
- Platforms: Browser, iPhone, iPad, Android, Windows, Macintosh, Windows Phone 8
- Release: November 30, 2011
- Genre: Digital collectible card game
- Modes: Single-player, multiplayer

Cabals: Magic & Battle Cards is a digital collectible card game designed by Mika Rosendahl and developed by Finnish studio Kyy Games. The game combines a board mechanic and cross-platform online multiplayer gameplay. Cabals: The Card Game was published on November 30, 2011, for iPhone, iPad, Android and Internet Browsers. The newly named Cabals: Magic & Battle Cards was released on April 11, 2014.

In Cabals: Magic & Battle Cards, two players struggle for dominance by playing and moving cards on a game board. Both players use their own deck of cards that gives them a selection of units and abilities to choose from. There are two different ways to win, which enables numerous ways to overcome the opponent. The board introduces a tactical aspect to the card play, by making positioning a big part of the game, and changes shape from match to match.

On May 14, 2015, a crowdfunding project was launched by Kyy Games to fund a tabletop adaptation of the digital game.

== Setting ==
The world of Cabals: Magic & Battle Cards is inspired by various real mystical and esoteric traditions. It has been developed specifically for Cabals: Magic & Battle Cards with the help of author Johanna Sinisalo. Each individual card uses originals paintings for its visual art.

Set in Europe between the two world wars, Cabals: Magic & Battle Cards places the players in the middle of a different kind of struggle, one fought in shadows. It's a war between cabals, secret societies dedicated to harnessing the forbidden powers to their own ends. It's a war over influence and a chance to shape the future of humankind.

The power struggle is between six cabals:

- Danann Covenant are a group of jazz-age witches who have summoned the forgotten Sidhe to their side
- Bearclaw Brotherhood is built upon the powers of the shamans and the command they have over the land, spirits and the Slavic people
- Vril Society combines strange Vril energy to the latest technological discoveries for powerful and unusual results
- Order of Zahir relies on the esoteric art of alchemy, and are masters over both mind and matter
- Sons of Osiris acolytes and necromancers from Egypt, relying on the art of necromancy and priesthood
- Dragon Enclave shaolin monks built upon fundamental taoism, along with the summoning of a number of powerful, ancient legendary dragons on their side

== Gameplay ==
Gameplay takes place between two players – either against an AI (Artificial Intelligence) opponent in single-player, or another person in online multiplayer. Matches are played on a random game board, with each player using their own pre-constructed deck of cards. A typical game board will have two stronghold locations, several resource locations, and in some cases additional deployment locations. The objective of the game is to win either by capturing your opponent's stronghold, or collecting 60 Domination points (the game's internal scoring mechanic for controlling locations). Each player has a special Hero unit with a once-per-game ability and plays their turn by commanding unit cards and casting action cards.

Players must manage their resources to play cards. Each card has a base cost and a loyalty cost – a base cost is the minimum that a card will cost the player (in resources) and the loyalty cost is a bonus that is reduced if other cards from the same suit are already in play.

Units (cards that can be placed on the board) can only be placed on a deployment location controlled by that player. Most unit cards have a single move per turn – and some units have special abilities that can usually only be cast once per turn. This creates a game play mechanic for the player where they must carefully manage not only the cards in their hand, but also the movement of their units on the game board while defending against the movements of their opponent.

Actions (cards that can be played directly from the hand) usually indicate a target, or sometimes have a global effect that affects all cards on the board.

Combat takes place when two units try to occupy the same position on the game board. A unit has a power number that determines how much damage it can deal and absorb. When a unit receives more damage than its power number, it is destroyed. Some units are given special abilities that modify their power.

=== Deck construction ===
Constructing a card deck is a significant part of gameplay in Cabals: Magic & Battle Cards. A deck may contain any number of cards but must maintain a minimum of 30 cards. There is a limit of three repeat cards per deck. Each deck includes a special Hero unit that has a powerful once-per-game ability. Cards that can be placed into a deck are limited by the special Hero unit that is chosen - meaning that some cards are available only to certain heroes, while other cards are prohibited.

== Reception ==
Cassandra Khaw of TouchArcade gave Cabals: The Card Game a review of 4/5 stars, stating "Cabals is easy to grasp and surprisingly deep for something that can, at times, feel like a distilled version of the genre."

Adam Smith of Rock, Paper, Shotgun stated that "I do like the art style [though] and for some reason the use of a board makes this somehow more gripping. I reckon I'm either going to be addicted to it by the end of the month, or I'll have all but forgotten it exists."

Brad Cummings of BoardGameGeek gave Cabals: The Card Game a review of 4/5 stars, stating, "The cross-platform features generally work well, and it offers a lot of content at a low entry fee. The tactical play is a great direction to take deck building and makes the game about more than chaining combos."

Geoff Gibson of DIY Gamer gave Cabals: The Card Game a generally positive review (no ranking), stating, "Anybody who enjoys card games should get a kick out of Cabals, especially because of its very detailed card designs."
