= Culdcept Revolt =

2016 video game

- North American cover art
- Developer: OmiyaSoft
- Publishers: JP: Nintendo; WW: NIS America
- Composer: Kenji Ito
- Series: Culdcept
- Platform: Nintendo 3DS
- Release: JP: July 7, 2016; NA: October 3, 2017; EU: October 6, 2017; AU: October 13, 2017
- Genre: Turn-based strategy
- Modes: Single-player, multiplayer

Culdcept Revolt (Note: Japanese: カルドセプト リボルト, Hepburn: Karudoseputo Riboruto) is a turn-based strategy video game developed by OmiyaSoft and published by Nintendo for the Nintendo 3DS. It is part of the Culdcept series. The game was released in July 2016 in Japan and in October 2017 internationally by NIS America.

== Plot ==
Allen, the game's protagonist, is found unconscious and with amnesia on the streets of Celphas, a medieval-styled city, by Alicia, the leader of the Free Bats, a resistance group that opposes the city's ruler, Count Kraniss. Kraniss closed off the city, preventing anyone from entering or exiting, and seeks to wipe out all Cepters, those who can manipulate magical cards. Allen is a Cepter himself, and gradually gains power as he fights against enemy Cepters hired by the Count. Eventually, he fights his way to Kraniss' castle, defeating Kraniss.

Allen learns that Kraniss actually sealed off the city because most of the rest of the world had actually fallen into a void due to the abandonment of the Chief God. The holy city of Dafnelion is still standing, however, and connects to Celphas, allowing them to travel there. They begin to seek a means to restore the world from its nigh-total destruction.

Eventually, Allen and his fellow Cepters, some from the Count's former army, discover a time portal. They go back in time and encounter the brother and sister gods of the world, whose fighting brought about the end of the world after they destroyed each other. Allen realizes that they were being manipulated into opposing each other by one of their supposed servants. They manage to defeat this evil god and change the future so that the world survives.

== Release ==
Culdcept Revolt was announced in a Japan-only Nintendo Direct on May 11, 2016, followed by another session showing gameplay on June 22. The game was finally released on July 7, 2016 by Nintendo, who had previously released a Nintendo 3DS remake of the first game.

On February 12, 2017, NIS America announced that the company would bring a localized version of the game to North America and Europe on August 29 and September 1, 2017, respectively. However, citing "to accommodate the manufacturing and production of the game", NIS America delayed the release of the game to October 3 for North America, and October 6 for Europe.

== Reception ==
Reception

Aggregate score
Aggregator	Score
Metacritic	74/100

Review scores
Publication	Score
Destructoid	7/10
Famitsu	33/40
Hardcore Gamer	3.5/5
Jeuxvideo.com	13/20
MeriStation	6/10
Nintendo Life	8/10
Nintendo World Report	8.5/10

The game received "mixed or average" reviews according to the review aggregation website Metacritic. In Japan, Famitsu gave it a score of three eights and one nine for a total of 33 out of 40.

Destructoid found the game difficult to review, stating "The concept is simultaneously inventive and archaic, doling out moments of pure delight and agonizing frustration in equal doses. Culdcept Revolt is such a niche title – perhaps the most niche game in my gaming history – I can’t tell you if you'll like it."
