= Cross Blitz =

2023 video game

- Developer: Tako Boy Studios
- Publishers: The Arcade Crew, Gamera Games
- Programmer: Tom Ferrer
- Artist: Phil Giarrusso
- Composers: Cactus Bear, Fat Bard
- Platform: Windows
- Release: November 23, 2023 (early access); November 24, 2025 (full release)
- Genres: Digital collectible card game, role-playing video game
- Mode: Single-player

Cross Blitz is a digital collectible card game and role-playing video game hybrid developed by Tako Boy Studios and published by The Arcade Crew and Gamera Games. It was released in early access on November 29, 2023, for Windows, and saw a full release on November 24, 2025. Set in the fantasy world of Crossdawn Isle, the game is split into multiple single-player campaigns called Fables, each connected to each other, but following a different protagonist. It also includes Tusk Tales, a roguelite mode resembling Slay the Spire in which players choose a mercenary and attempt to beat bosses in different areas of the world while building their deck. While a third mode involving online multiplayer had been planned, it was later cancelled due to the first two modes becoming so large in scope. The game was positively received by critics, who praised the gameplay, graphics and music, despite noting its similarity to many other titles in the genre.

== Gameplay ==
Screenshot of the playing field, with the player's cards on the bottom

In the card game, each player's side is separated into two rows of four spaces that face the other player. Players can place cards in each unoccupied space, but playing each card takes up Mana, a resource that regenerates each turn while increasing by one each time. Cards will automatically start attacking the turn after they are played, though some abilities let them attack immediately. To expand their deck, players can both buy new cards with money earned from winning battles, or craft them using materials at a blacksmith.

In the campaign, players navigate predetermined routes on a overworld made up of hexagonal tiles, which contains both visual novel-style events between characters in the party, and enemies that can be engaged in optional or mandatory battles.

== Plot ==
=== Setting ===
The game is set on Crossdawn Isle, a continent split into numerous different biomes, such as forests, plains, and a Caribbean-like ocean, the Southron Sea. Humans live alongside many different humanoid races, such as anthropomorphic mammals, birds, lizards, fish, a race of living fungi, and intelligent robots.

=== Story ===
The game takes place across five separate episodes whose stories are linked. The first follows Redcroft, an anthropomorphic lion pirate, who is captured by a race of lizard-people and, alongside his first mate and a powerful dark mage sent to ensure his obedience, forced to recover his ship and journey in search of a cursed treasure. The second follows a free-spirited human pop star and dark sorceress named Violet who, after accompanying Redcroft on his adventure, splits up to investigate a mysterious impostor who has been besmirching her name while accompanied by her manager. The third follows Quill, a small, rat-like thief who executes a dangerous heist of a wealthy noble's mansion with the unwitting help of an elf ambassador, while the fourth follows Seto, a young monk and martial artist from a race of anthropomorphic fish who journeys to find his master and compete in a martial arts tournament in a mountain temple. Finally, the fifth story follows Mereena- the aforementioned ambassador- who seeks to unite the various tribes of her kingdom to prevent a war.

== Development ==
Developer Tako Boy Studios is based in San Diego, California.

== Reception ==
Reception

Aggregate score
Aggregator	Score
Metacritic	PC: 87/100

Review scores
Publication	Score
Try Hard Guides	9/10
The Games Machine	9/10
Hey Poor Player	8.3/10

Cross Blitz received generally favorable reviews from critics, according to the review aggregation website Metacritic.

During early access, Dominic Tarason of PC Gamer called Cross Blitz "charming", describing it as "Hearthstone-lite" but for single-player gamers, while also comparing it to Inscryption conceptually. He described the campaign's puzzle-like objectives as making it stand out from Tusk Tales. He praised the game as easy to jump into, noting that Tusk Tales would likely have more replayability. He was surprised by the game's lack of multiplayer functionality, and said that the game's pacing was slow due to unskippable animations. While being satisfied with the game overall, he noted it was entering a crowded genre with much competition. Kyle LeClair of Hardcore Gamer also responded positively, calling the card game deep due to the sheer amount of cards and detail of the gameplay. Katharine Castle of Rock Paper Shotgun said that she was "hooked" on the game, describing it as similar to Inscryption if it were only a card game. Calling the cards "good fun", she recommended players download the demo and try the game when it was available.
