= Faeria =

2017 digital collectible card and turn-based strategy game

- Developer: Abrakam
- Publisher: Versus Evil
- Engine: Unity
- Platforms: Microsoft Windows; macOS; Linux; Xbox One; Nintendo Switch; PlayStation 4
- Release: Microsoft Windows, macOS, Linux: WW: March 8, 2017; Xbox One, Nintendo Switch: WW: August 13, 2020; PlayStation 4: WW: November 3, 2020
- Genres: Collectible card game, turn-based strategy
- Modes: Single-player, multiplayer

Faeria is a digital collectible card and turn-based strategy game that takes place on a dynamic playing board set in a fantasy universe. The game was developed by Abrakam, and released for desktop platforms in 2017, for Xbox One and Nintendo Switch in August 2020 and for PlayStation 4 in November 2020. The game was well received by critics, holding a score of 80/100 on review aggregation website Metacritic.

== Gameplay ==
Faeria is a combination of a digital collectible card game with a "living" game board concept. Players in Faeria battle one-on-one against other players or computer-controlled opponents. Battles take place on an empty hex board, with two vying avatars placed on opposite sides of this map; the maps also include four Faeria wells at other corners. Each player starts with a deck of thirty cards.

At the start of a player's turn, they draw a card from their deck and gain three Faeria. If they have control of any of the Faeria wells, by having a creature next to it, they gain an extra Faeria per well. They may then perform one action from their Power Wheel, play any number of cards limited by the cards' Faeria cost and land requirements, and/or move any creatures they have on the map, in any order. The Power Wheel allows the player to either gain one Faeria, draw one card, or to place land tiles onto the game board; this can be either two Neutral (Prairie) land tiles, or one tile representing Mountain, Forest, Desert, or Lake. New tiles can only be placed next to tiles the player previously placed, or adjacent to tiles one of their creatures occupy.

Cards are played by expending Faeria; additionally, some cards require a minimum number of non-Neutral lands to be in the player's control. Cards include summonable creatures which have attack and health values, structures which have health values, and events that have an immediate impact such as damage, buff, or debuff creatures. Creatures can be summoned to any tile under the player's control, though creatures that require non-Neutral lands can only be summoned onto tiles of that type. Creatures cannot normally move or attack the round they are summoned, but on subsequent turns can move one space and attack an adjacent enemy. Creatures deal damage equal to their attack value, and when they take damage from a defending creature, this is subtracted from their current health. If the creature's health drops to zero, it is removed from the board.

The goal for each player is to reduce the opponent's avatar health to zero before their own is exhausted. Part of the game's strategy is managing the placement of tiles on the board to create routes for one's creatures to reach the opponent while limiting progress from the opponent.

Winning games earns in-game currency that can be used to purchase new packs of cards, from which the player can then customize their deck.

The game includes a series of single-player content against a computer opponent to help learn the game, and puzzles and challenges to improve one's strategy.

The game features a couple modes of gameplay. Battle mode allows players to play against each other with their custom decks. Pandora mode is a draft-based approach where players make a new deck from a series of randomly offered cards, with which the player attempts to win until achieving three losses, at which point the deck is retired, and the player wins rewards based on how successful the deck was.

Faeria features an in-game integrated tournament mode and holds monthly official e-sport competitions.

== Development ==
The earliest concepts for Faeria began in 2005, and it has been in constant development since 2010. The game was partially funded through a Kickstarter crowdfunding campaign by Belgian studio Abrakam, raising $94,008 towards its development in November 2013. Faeria entered Steam Early Access in March 2016, and had its official release a year later in March 2017. Its first expansion pack, "Adventure Pouch: Oversky" was released in August 2017.

In December 2015, it was announced that Faeria would transition from a "pay once and play forever" model into free-to-play and in August 2016, Faeria officially went free-to-play. On March 30, 2018, Abrakam announced the end of support for mobile versions of Faeria and a transition from free-to-play back to a buy-to-play model. Free-to-play officially ended on July 18, 2018, with the release of the Fall of Everlife expansion.

A port for PlayStation 4 was released on November 3, 2020, with full cross-play with existing versions.
