= List of Jewelpet video games =

This is the list of games based on the Sanrio-Sega Sammy Holdings franchise Jewelpet, organized by the system they were originally released. Years listed indicate the time of the games' first availability.

== Nintendo DS ==
Game	Details
Jewelpet: Cute Magical Fantasy Original release date(s): Japan: 2009-04-30	Release years by system: 2009—Nintendo DS
Jewelpet: Cute Magical Fantasy Original release date(s): Japan: 2009-04-30	Notes: First Jewelpet rhythm game released on the Nintendo DS. Developed and Published by MTO.; Utilizes the Nintendo DS console in a horizontal layout and uses the DS Stylus to navigate through the game. Magic sessions were also utilized by the stylus as well, letting the player touch the flowers appearing on the screen to successfully synchronize with the music. Wi-Fi Connection is also available, allowing online gameplay with other players.
Jewelpet: Magical DS Kirapi Kariin Original release date(s): Japan: 2009-12-17	Release years by system: 2009—Nintendo DS
Jewelpet: Magical DS Kirapi Kariin Original release date(s): Japan: 2009-12-17	Notes: Second Jewelpet rhythm game. Developed and Published by MTO.; Features updated mechanics such as utilization of the DS's microphone, character voices from the anime and VS Magic sessions. Interactions with the player's Jewelpet is introduced in this game.; The first and only Jewelpet Game that made it into the Famitsu Hall of Fame.; Adapts certain elements from the first season of Jewelpet.
Jewelpet: Let's play Together in the Room of Magic! Original release date(s): Japan: 2010-08-05	Release years by system: 2010—Nintendo DS
Jewelpet: Let's play Together in the Room of Magic! Original release date(s): Japan: 2010-08-05	Notes: Third entry to the Jewelpet Game series.; Last Jewelpet game developed and published by MTO before the gaming rights were transferred to Furyu.; Utilizes the Nintendo DS console in a vertical layout and is based on the Jewelpet Twinkle anime. It has a different gameplay style, which departs from the first two sequels and combines elements from Life simulation and Dating sim games. Few improvements were made in the gameplay such as improved interactions with your Jewelpet, accessories for the Jewelpet characters, mini-games and newer magic sessions. Few items in the game has connectivity to Jewel Land Online.

== Nintendo 3DS ==
Game	Details
Jewelpet: Magical Rhythm Yay! Original release date(s): Japan: 2011-11-10	Release years by system: 2011—Nintendo 3DS
Jewelpet: Magical Rhythm Yay! Original release date(s): Japan: 2011-11-10	Notes: Fourth Jewelpet game in the series and the third rhythm game in the series.; Developed and Published by Furyu.; Adapts both the musical elements of the first two Nintendo DS games as well as the life simulation elements of the third game using the 3DS's Augmented reality system. It also adapts certain elements from third anime series, Jewelpet Sunshine.
Jewelpet: Magical Dance in Style☆Deco! Original release date(s): Japan: 2012-11-08	Release years by system: 2012—Nintendo 3DS
Jewelpet: Magical Dance in Style☆Deco! Original release date(s): Japan: 2012-11-08	Notes: Fifth Jewelpet game in the series and the fourth rhythm game in the series.; Developed and Published by Furyu.; Features updated mechanics and features. Includes some elements from the third game and the inclusion of the Fashion Show feature. It adapt some elements from the fourth series, Jewelpet Kira☆Deco!.
Jewelpet: Cooking at the Magical Cafe! Original release date(s): Japan: 2013-11-14	Release years by system: 2013—Nintendo 3DS
Jewelpet: Cooking at the Magical Cafe! Original release date(s): Japan: 2013-11-14	Notes: Sixth Jewelpet game in the series and the second Life simulation game in the series.; Developed and Published by Furyu.; Features Life simulation elements from the third game and cooking elements. It adapts some elements from the fifth series, Jewelpet Happiness.; The first Jewelpet 3DS game to be released in both Physical and downloadable forms in Japan.

== Arcade ==
Game	Details
Jewelpet: The Glittering Magical Jewel Box Original release date(s): Japan: 2009-10-27	Release years by system: 2009–2011—Arcade
Jewelpet: The Glittering Magical Jewel Box Original release date(s): Japan: 2009-10-27	Notes: First Puzzle Game entry to the series and the only Jewelpet game released in Arcades.; Developed and Published by Sega.; Spiritual sequel of Columns, in which has the same gameplay as the original game. The game uses collectible cards that can be linked into the game and the main objective is to collect jewels to gain several bonuses.
