= Shadow Era =

2011 video game

- Developer: Wulven Studios
- Publisher: Wulven Studios
- Engine: Unity
- Platforms: Microsoft Windows, iOS, Mac, Android
- Release: 24 February 2011
- Genre: Digital CCG
- Mode: Multiplayer; single-player

Shadow Era (also known as SE) is a free online digital collectible card game created by Vietnamese developer Wulven Studios. Cross platform gameplay is central to the digital version's design and it is supported on PC, Mac, iOS, and Android. A physical version has also been released.

== Gameplay ==
The game Shadow Era is currently played between two players. Each player has a Hero which starts with 26-30 health. Players win the game when they reduce the opponents health to 0. Heroes can lose life when they are dealt "damage" by being attacked with summoned allies, abilities and weapons. A Hero will also lose 1 health for each card they are unable to draw when their deck is empty.

Shadow Era currently consists of 5 in-game sets: Call of the Crystals, Dark Prophecies, Shattered Fates, Lost Lands Part 1, and Campaigns.

A player may only include cards in their deck that match the ‘Faction’ and ‘Class’ of the Hero they are using. Cards classed as ‘Neutral’ can be used by any Hero. A deck must contain a minimum of 39 cards and 1 Hero. (Exclusions exist when playing the AI in the digital version). New game modes have also been unveiled, such as Rated matches, Unrated matches, and Meltdown. In Rated matches, you are paired up with another human player. The winner's rating and score increases. Unrated matches do not increase your rating, although you are allowed to make private matches with or without a password. Meltdown is a game mode where you pick four random booster packs, pick one of the Heroes that came in those packs, build a deck with the cards from the packs, and play a match using it. Class and Faction restrictions are removed for Meltdown. You are not allowed to keep the Hero or the cards used in Meltdown.

Currencies within the game include Gold and Shadow Crystals. Gold can be collected from winning matches in Rated, ranking in the weekly Meltdown ladder, and selling cards to the in-game merchant. Shadow Crystals can be acquired by leveling up either your Hero level or your account level, and by purchasing from the in-game store for real money. Gold can be used to purchase new cards from the in-game merchant. Shadow Crystals can be used to purchase name changes, booster packs, class decks, as well as card sleeves and playmats. Shadow Crystals can be sent between players, but Gold cannot currently be shared with others.

== Resources ==
Shadow Era uses a Resource system to cover the summoning cost of every card. Each turn, the player has an option to sacrifice a card to add to their Resource pool. Each card has a summoning cost at the top left, and this number represents how many cards must have been sacrificed total, called Resources, in order to summon that card into play. Resources refresh every turn, allowing players to accumulate Resources over the duration of the match.

== Heroes ==
There are different types of Heroes as well. These include Warrior, Mage, Priest, Rogue, Hunter, Wulven, and Elemental. There are currently 34 Heroes in the digital game. Each player has the ability to buy different Heroes from the merchant screen in-game. Players are able to customize and alter their decks to fit their playing style. When you start the game, you will see a map, which will be related to the Lore of the Hero selected. On each map there are 10 available missions, with 1 (easy), 2 (medium), and 3 (hard) star difficulties.

Current Human Faction Heroes: Boris Skullcrusher (Human Warrior), Amber Rain (Human Warrior), Tala Pureheart (Human Warrior), Nishaven (Human Mage), Eladwen Frostmire (Human Mage), Aramia (Human Mage), Loest, Savior of Layar (Human Mage), Victor Heartstriker (Human Hunter), Gwenneth Truesight (Human Hunter), Ythan Redthorn (Human Hunter), Lance Shadowstalker (Human Rogue), Serena Thoughtripper (Human Rogue), Garth Ravensoul (Human Rogue), Zhanna Mist (Human Priest), Jericho Spellbane (Human Priest), Threbin the Righteous (Human Priest), She-Lah (Human Wulven)

Current Shadow Faction Heroes: Ter Adun (Shadow Warrior), Logan Stonebreaker (Shadow Warrior), Vess Swifthands (Shadow Warrior), Rothem, King of Layar (Shadow Warrior), Gravebone (Shadow Mage), Majiya (Shadow Mage), Raikka Spellseeker (Shadow Mage), Banebow (Shadow Hunter), Baduruu (Shadow Hunter), Skervox (Shadow Hunter), Zaladar (Shadow Elemental), Elementalis (Shadow Elemental), Praxix (Shadow Elemental), Darkclaw (Shadow Wulven), Moonstalker (Shadow Wulven), Bloodfang (Shadow Wulven), Markus the Fallen (Shadow Priest)

== Guilds ==
Guilds are a growing and constantly evolving part of Shadow Era. Popular apps on the iOS App Store and the Android Google Play Store are used for communication between members, including Telegram and QQ. Guilds in Shadow Era are free to create, and tend to congregate on their chosen communications app.

The guilds in Shadow Era are simply groups of players who wish to excel in the game and formed cooperative and competitive teams to do so. You will see guild members in-game marked by their guild tag in front of their player names. (Example: SD Vexmaw)

The guild list will grow, shrink, and change, but the idea stays the same: groups of players helping each other become better at Shadow Era and enjoy the game together.

== Reception ==
Reception

Aggregate scores
Aggregator	Score
GameRankings	90/100
Metacritic	89/100

Critical reception for Shadow Era has been positive and it currently holds a ranking of 90 on Metacritic (based on 5 reviews) and 90% on GameRankings (based on 2 reviews). AppSpy rated the game as 4 out of 5, writing "Shadow Era is a great first step for what could be a fantastic TCG for iOS devices - there's a lot of room for improvement, but the core gameplay is worth checking out if you're a fan of these sorts of games."
