= Super Sentai Battle: Dice-O =

2010 video game

- Publisher: Bandai
- Platform: Arcade
- Release: JP: March 4 2010
- Genre: Arcade
- Modes: Single-player, multiplayer

Super Sentai Battle: Dice-O (スーパー戦隊バトル ダイスオー, Sūpā Sentai Batoru Daisuō) is a combination arcade game and collectible card game featuring the characters of the Super Sentai series. Like Bandai's previous Cardass video game Kamen Rider Battle: Ganbaride, the game is a tie-in with TV Asahi and Toei Company's television series. Its promotion began with the promotion for the film Samurai Sentai Shinkenger vs. Go-onger: GinmakuBang!! and it is tied directly into the 2010 Super Sentai television series Tensou Sentai Goseiger. In 2011, the game Super Sentai Battle: Dice-O Deluxe (スーパー戦隊バトル ダイスオーDX, Sūpā Sentai Batoru Daisuō Derakkusu) was released, tying it in with Gokaiger. In 2014, the game Super Sentai Battle: Dice-O Express (スーパー戦隊バトル ダイスオーEX, Sūpā Sentai Batoru Daisuō Ekusupuresu) was released, tying it in with ToQger.

== See also ==
- Kamen Rider Battle: Ganbaride
