= Kamen Rider Battle: Ganbaride =

2008 arcade and Nintendo DS game

- Cover art for the Nintendo DS edition
- Publisher: Namco Bandai Games
- Platforms: Arcade, Nintendo DS
- Release: JP: October 15, 2008
- Genre: Arcade
- Modes: Single-player, multiplayer

Kamen Rider Battle: Ganbaride (仮面ライダーバトル ガンバライド, Kamen Raidā Batoru Ganbaraido; Masked Rider Battle: Ganbaride) is a combination of an arcade game and a collectible item game featuring the protagonists of the Kamen Rider Series. The game is being released as part of the 10th anniversary of the Heisei run Kamen Rider Series by Toei, TV Asahi & Ishimori Productions and features heavy tie-ins with the television series Kamen Rider Decade, whose protagonists use cards similar to those used in the game. It is played in a similar fashion to Sega's Mushiking and Dinosaur King games, and uses special Data Cardass cards released by Bandai. The game's card input uses collectible card game terminologies, and has resemblance and functionality similarly to the Decadriver in Decade. As the series progresses, the game controls change to suit the new Kamen Rider. During the airing of Kamen Rider OOO, Ganbaride arcade systems included an OOO Driver interface for the toy Core Medals, and with the broadcast of Kamen Rider Fourze, slots for the Astro Switches became available, and the system became 3 VS. 3. During the broadcast of Kamen Rider Wizard, Wizard Rings were available to use, and the game was reverted to 2 VS. 2 battles.

McDonald's restaurants in Japan have released special promotional Ganbaride cards with their Happy Meals to tie in with the various Kamen Rider films in Japanese theaters at the time.

A Nintendo DS port of the game subtitled Card Battle War (カードバトル大戦, Kādo Batoru Taisen) was released on July 29, 2010.

Ever since Kamen Rider Gaim's TV series airing until onwards, Ganbaride was renamed to Kamen Rider Battle: Ganbarizing (仮面ライダーバトル ガンバライジング, Kamen Raidā Batoru Ganbaraijingu; Masked Rider Battle: Ganbarizing).

On March 23, 2023, Ganbarizing was renamed to Kamen Rider Battle: Ganba Legends (仮面ライダーバトル ガンバレジェンズ, Kamen Raidā Batoru Ganba Rejenzu; Masked Rider Battle: Ganba Legends).

== Game cards ==
The game uses two different kinds of cards. The red Hero Cards (ヒーローカード, Hīrō Kādo) represent the Kamen Riders (and, more recently, some Imagin) and are used by the player at the start of the game to form their team. Hero Cards are marked by a number of parameters, including Attack, Defense, Power, and a Finishing Move, as well as the slots which represent the character's ability to attack. Each Hero Card also has an attribute that determines advantage and disadvantage using a Rock-paper-scissors system: Speed (速, Hayasa) cards have an advantage over Power (力, Chikara) cards, which have an advantage over Technique (技, Waza) cards, which have an advantage over Speed cards. Though the cards are labeled Kamen Ride (カメンライド, Kamen Raido), Attack Ride (アタックライド, Atakku Raido), and Form Ride (フォームライド, Fōmu Raido) as per the Kamen Rider Decade television series, all three function identically within Ganbaride.

The gold-colored Special Cards (スペシャルカード, Supesharu Kādo) come in three different forms. The Final Ride (ファイナルライド, Fainaru Raido) Cards are used to achieve temporary effects, such as increasing one's own parameters or decreasing the opponent's. In later sets, Final Ride cards were introduced that summon a Rider's support vehicles (such as the Auto Vajin or DenLiner) to perform a special attack. Final Attack Ride (ファイナルアタックライド, Fainaru Attaku Raido) and Final Form Ride (ファイナルフォームライド, Fainaru Fōmu Raido) Cards are used to initiate one of Kamen Rider Decade's special finishing moves using the transformed state of another Rider.

The cards come in five different rarities: Normal, Rare, Special, Super Rare, and Legend Rare. The rarer cards tend to be more powerful, with Super Rare and Legend Rare possessing gold text and holofoil backgrounds.

== Gameplay ==
At the start of the game, the player forms his team by scanning two Hero Cards, the first being his main hero and the second being his support, performing extra attacks or shielding the main Rider from attacks as determined by their Guard trait. Alternately, the player can choose to play as Kamen Rider Decade in the form of one of the nine Heisei Kamen Riders by pressing the Belt Button in lieu of scanning a main Hero Card, then scanning a card representing the hero whose form he wishes Decade to use. Compatibility between the two heroes is also an important factor, as more compatible Riders gain bonuses. Before each round, the player performs a Belt Lamp Roulette, which gives further bonuses. During the Slot Phase, the player team and opposing team use a roulette slot system to determine their attacks, which are divided by type (for example, punches, kicks, and weapon attacks) and power. Whichever team has the highest combined value attacks first; in the event of a tie, a Rider Rush occurs, in which both sides must press the buttons rapidly, with the winner automatically performing a Fierce Attack. The Fierce Attack is the Rider's strongest attack on the roulette slot, and takes priority over any other combination; if one team performs a Fierce Attack, the opponent becomes stunned, making them lose their turn. If either team gets two of the same type of attack icon (for instance, two kicks), the Riders will perform an extra-powerful Double Attack.

The second round and all subsequent rounds allow the use of Special Cards, as well as Memory Change, an ability unique to Kamen Rider Double that lets him change between his many forms. Only one Special Card and one Memory Change can be used per battle (though using one does not preclude the other). As the battle continues, each team builds up Ride Power, shown on the bottom of the screen as a meter. When the meter is 70% full, the team leader can perform his Finishing Move; at 100%, a Double Rider Finisher can be performed. Usually this takes the form of the secondary Rider attacking their opponent to allow the leader to perform his Finishing Move, though some teams of Riders instead perform a Double Rider Kick. During each Finishing Move's animation, the player is prompted to press the belt button at certain moments to increase the damage dealt; if a player is on the receiving end of a CPU opponent's Finishing Move, these prompts will instead reduce damage taken. Sometimes, thanks to proper support from the secondary Rider, a team may receive Rider Guts when knocked out, restoring some health and allowing them to continue fighting. Play proceeds until one team is defeated; if a battle continues for four or five rounds without a clear winner, the game may declare a Final Round, introducing a Sudden Death element by reducing both teams to 1 Hit Point but filling their Rider Power to 100%, meaning the first team to land a successful attack wins.

Some Riders receive unique bonuses when first used. For example, Decade Complete Form has Complete Scan, wherein the player is prompted to scan as many Hero Cards as possible within ten seconds, receiving a bonus based on how many unique cards were inputted. If the player uses Memory Change to transform into Double CycloneJokerXtreme, he receives an Xtreme Chance, a roulette bonus similar to the Belt Lamp Roulette with four separate bonuses determined by which Gaia Memories are placed into the Prism Bicker.

In Single Player, a player who performs well may receive a special EX Stage in which he faces a much stronger team. A player who performs exceptionally well may receive a Hyper EX Stage where he faces an incredibly strong team, made up of characters who are not available to players in the current upgrade (but will be included in the next expansion). Unlike normal play, if the player loses during an EX or Hyper EX Stage, there is no option to continue.

As of the change to the Kamen Rider Wizard-based interface, the game system has undergone several changes. First, the rock-paper-scissors aspect has been removed, and Riders are now categorized into types, with new types being introduced along with new card waves. The five starting types were Fire, Water, Wind, Earth, Space, and Multi. The second set introduced three types: Thunder, Kiai, and Mecha. The third set introduced six types: Dark, Beast, Dazzle, Space-Time, Light, and Fusion. It also introduced IC Cards, which allow players to have a game save, and progress through various battle stages. With the IC Cards came a leveling system, wherein winning battles with a rider from a specific type will level up that type. The levels not only affect the stats of the riders, but also determine their special attacks, as now Hero Cards have different special attacks depending on what level their type is. Additionally, Special Cards are now only usable at the beginning of the scan phase, rather than during combat. Another new addition are Battle Supporters, characters who can provide an assist attack once per battle.

== Nintendo DS port ==
A Nintendo DS port of the game subtitled Card Battle War (カードバトル大戦, Kādo Batoru Taisen) was released on July 29, 2010, featuring a modified game system as there is no on-board card reader for the handheld. The player controls a fan of the Ganbaride game who has to use his or her ability at the game to work for the DOLL paranormal research group who have discovered a weird bug in the game system. Meanwhile, an evil organization called "Bug" has come forward to use this dangerous game mechanic to their advantage.

== See also ==
- Super Sentai Battle: Dice-O
