= Culdcept (2001 video game) =

2001 turn-based strategy video game

- North American cover art, entitled Culdcept as the first game to be localized
- Developer: OmiyaSoft
- Publishers: JP: Media Factory (DC); JP: Sega (PS2); NA: Interchannel (PS2)
- Director: Hideo Suzuki
- Producer: Kohei Takeshige
- Designer: Takayuki Jingu
- Programmer: Yukihiro Higuchi
- Composer: Kenji Ito
- Series: Culdcept
- Platforms: Dreamcast; PlayStation 2 Nintendo 3DS
- Release: Dreamcast: JP: July 12, 2001; PlayStation 2: JP: September 26, 2002; NA: December 1, 2003; Nintendo 3DS: JP: June 28, 2012
- Genres: Board game, collectible card game
- Modes: Single player, multiplayer

Culdcept (known as Culdcept II (Note: Japanese: カルドセプト セカンド, Hepburn: Karudoseputo Sekando) in Japan) is a turn-based strategy video game for the Dreamcast released in 2001. It is the sequel to the Saturn title Culdcept. An enhanced version of the game, Culdcept II: Expansion (Note: Japanese: カルドセプト セカンド エキスパンション, Hepburn: Karudoseputo Sekando Ekisupanshon), was released for the PlayStation 2 on September 26, 2002. The expansion was marketed in North America as Culdcept, and published by NEC Interchannel in December 2003. An enhanced port was released for the Nintendo 3DS on June 28, 2012.

== Plot ==
The game board in Culdcept, in this case full of monsters with their toll displayed beneath them.

The Goddess Culdra foresees that a powerful Cepter known as Geminigh will gain nearly infinite power, destroying all of creation. She sends Goligan, a talking cane who is her messenger, from her original world, Ruedo, to the player's world, in order to track down the Cepter who will become Geminigh and stop them. However, Goligan is unsuccessful, until he meets the player, in the form of a customized avatar. Sensing that the player has great power, Goligan teams up with them in order to track down the evil Cepter, stop them, and save the universe from destruction.

== Reception ==
Reception

Aggregate score
Aggregator	Score
Metacritic	78/100

Review scores
Publication	Score
Famitsu	(DC) 37/40 (PS2) 35/40 (3DS) 32/40
Game Informer	8/10
GamePro	3.5/5
GameRevolution	B
GameSpot	7.9/10
GameSpy	4.5/5
GameZone	8/10
IGN	8.7/10
Official U.S. PlayStation Magazine	3.5/5
X-Play	3/5

The original Culdcept II was given a high score of 37 out of 40 by Famitsu. The expansion was given a 35 out of 40. The game had sold over 65,000 units to date.

In the West, Culdcept's PS2 version received "generally favorable reviews" according to the review aggregation website Metacritic. Jeremy Dunham of IGN called it "bizarrely unique". Stating it was "incredibly fun, deceptively deep, and always entertaining", he praised the gameplay, but criticized the lack of online features or downloadable maps. He also called the game's graphics "dated", but praised the game's card art. Mike David of GameZone called it "incredibly addictive" and a "good solid game", but criticized its lack of voice acting and music that "just seems to fade into the background". He called the graphics "straight off of the Sega Saturn playlist", but "classic looking", and commended the "sweet looking character models". Greg Kasavin of GameSpot called it "easily recommendable to fans of strategy games and even to fans of role-playing games", as well as "surprisingly fun and addictive". However, he also stated that "the luck-based matches will cause you some frustration from time to time".
