= Kards =

Online game

Kards - The World War 2 Card Game
- Kards logo
- Developer: 1939 Games
- Publisher: 1939 Games
- Designers: Ívar Kristjánsson; Guðmundur Kristjánsson
- Engine: Unreal Engine
- Platform: Microsoft Windows, Android, iOS
- Release: Microsoft Windows; April 12, 2019 (Early access) April 15, 2020 (Official release); iOS/Android; June 6, 2023 (Official release)
- Genre: Digital collectible card game
- Modes: Single-player, multiplayer

Kards is a free to play World War II themed online digital collectible card game developed and published by 1939 Games. It was released in early access on Steam on April 12, 2019, and was fully released on April 15, 2020. Mobile ports with crossplay capabilities between platforms have been released for both iOS and Android on June 6, 2023.

== Gameplay ==
Kards is a turn-based collectible card game. It is played between two players, each with a deck of 40 cards themed around strategies of powers during World War II: Germany, Great Britain, Soviet Union, the United States and Imperial Japan. Players can choose to build a deck using one of the five major powers. Additionally, Poland, Italy, France, Finland and ANZAC are available as ally nations. Though the game is based on historical warfare, individual decks may contain two opposing nations (for example, it is possible to create a deck with Germany as the major power and the Soviet Union as an ally.) Each nation has its own unique strategy and playstyle. While each nation has a certain theme, decks within the same nation can vary wildly. For example, the Soviet Union often utilizes light infantry combined with Area of effect buffs to overwhelm the opponent with sheer numbers. However, there are other archetypes that players can build their decks around when using the Soviet nation such as decks that damage its own headquarters in order to buff its units, or decks focusing on T-34 tanks instead of light infantry. The objective is to destroy the enemy's headquarters, represented by a card on the board.

The playing field, called "battlefield" in-game, is divided into three fronts, the player's support line, front line, and the enemy's support line. The support and front line can hold up to four and five cards respectively, but units must be deployed in the player's support line when played. In order to play cards, players expend a resource called 'Kredit;' that refreshes every turn, after which the maximum Kredit increases by one, up to 12 after which ramp cards must be played to get to the maximum of 24. Kredits can also be used to move military units to the front line or to attack enemy units. Once a unit has been moved to the front line, they cannot retreat back unless forced to by certain cards that specify otherwise. The front line can only be controlled by one player at a time, as such, whoever controls it has a strategic advantage on the battlefield.

=== Game modes ===
Kards offers players the opportunity to compete against a computer AI or human opponents online through a tiered-ranking system. At the end of each one-month-long season, players' ranks reset, allowing for fresh competition and new opportunities to climb the ladder. Alternatively, players can engage in draft matches against other human players, where they must build a deck from scratch by choosing one card out of three randomly presented options at a time until they have a complete deck. They will then use this deck to compete, aiming to win as many games as possible. Draft ends when the player either loses three games or wins seven. Rewards in the draft mode are based on players' performance.

Kards also includes a skirmish mode that is available periodically. In this mode, players must build a deck following a set of rules that changes each skirmish. Achieving victory in this mode usually will reward players with a card pack, though rewards can vary.

Moreover, Kards offers five single-player campaigns that allow players to immerse themselves in themed military campaigns from the war. These campaigns provide a narrative-driven experience where players can progress through various missions, experiencing key moments and battles from World War II.

== Development and release ==
1939 Days was founded in 2015 by former CEO Ívar Kristjánsson and Project Lead Guðmundur Kristjánsson of CCP Games, best known for developing Eve Online, with Kards being their first project.

At first, Kards started out as a cardboard prototype using real life cards and went into full production as an online CCG after receiving a $70,000 grant, making its first public appearance in March 2019.

Over the course of its development, Kards received $100 million in endowments from venture funds, including the Chinese investing company Tencent, to support future updates and a mobile version of the game.

Card artwork was sourced and licensed from World War II enlistment posters, propaganda art, and toy box art from the 1970s and 1980s, including box art of Airfix scale model kits famously painted by Roy Cross. Artwork is also commissioned from private artists as a last resort. Most of the commissioned art comes from David Pentland and Jarosław Wróbel.

The game released on April 15, 2020, on PC with continued post-launch support in the form of expansions, timed-limited events, and hotfixes.

== Reception ==
Reception

Aggregate score
Aggregator	Score
Metacritic	80/100

Kards received generally favorable reviews from critics, according to the review aggregation website Metacritic.
