= Dinosaur King (video game) =

2007 video game

- Developer: Sega AM3
- Publisher: Sega
- Platform: Nintendo DS
- Release: JP: November 11, 2007; AU: September 4, 2008; EU: September 5, 2008; NA: September 23, 2008
- Genre: Role-playing
- Mode: Single-player

Dinosaur King (古代王者 恐竜キング ７つのかけら, Kodai Ōja: Kyōryū Kingu 7-tsu no Kakera; literally "Ancient Ruler: Dinosaur King - The Seven Shrine Fragments" in Japan) is a video game for the Nintendo DS game based on the Dinosaur King TV series.

== Plot ==
Max, Rex, and Zoe, the members of the D-Team, find mysterious stones that allow them to summon dinosaurs, after creating special cards from fossils, using a special device called a Dinoshot, but an evil group called the Alpha Gang steals a Dinoshot in order to create a dinosaur empire. It is the D-Team's job to stop the Alpha Gang.

== Gameplay ==
Players gain new dinosaurs by restoring fossils through a minigame using the console's touchscreen to control a rock pick and microphone to blow away dust. The player has a limited amount of pick uses, and uncovering the entire fossil gives the player a rarer dinosaur than they would have usually gotten.

Battles take place as random encounters on the overworld map. Each side has a maximum of three dinosaurs which they can send out. The battle system is based on the game of rock, paper, and scissors-winning allows the dinosaur to attack, losing allows the opponent dinosaur to attack, and a tie inflicts neutral damage to either side. Several of the moves in the game become more powerful according to wins or losses, or they allow attacks on a tie.

Dinosaurs become stronger as they gain levels through experience. At certain levels, they generate move cards, which can be attached to dinosaurs as the player desires. Moves vary in function from dealing damage, inflicting status effects, summoning other creatures to assist the dinosaur, or changing the battlefield itself to power up a specific type.

Dinosaurs in the game are categorised according to elemental types, which include specific types of dinosaurs. Each type also has a strength and a weakness against another type. There are 72 dinosaurs available normally in the game, not including Secret type dinosaurs or dinosaurs which can only be obtained through entering a special code at a specific place in the game.

== Reception ==
Reception

Aggregate score
Aggregator	Score
Metacritic	61/100

Review scores
Publication	Score
IGN	6.6/10
Jeuxvideo.com	14/20
Nintendo Life	7/10
Nintendo World Report	8/10
PALGN	5/10
Pocket Gamer	2.5/5

The game received "mixed" reviews according to the review aggregation website Metacritic. IGN journalist Mark Bozon embraced the game's gameplay that he found nostalgic and its 3D animations, while dismissing the sound effects and "lifeless" 2D overworld.
