= Culdcept =

Series of turn-based strategy video games

- Genre: Turn-based strategy
- Developer: OmiyaSoft
- Publishers: OmiyaSoft; Nintendo
- Platforms: Sega Saturn, PlayStation, Dreamcast, PlayStation 2, Nintendo DS, Nintendo 3DS, PlayStation Portable, Xbox 360, PlayStation 3, Nintendo Switch, PlayStation 5, Xbox Series, PC, Nintendo Switch 2

Culdcept (カルドセプト, Karudoseputo) is a series of turn-based strategy video games developed by OmiyaSoft. It revolves around virtual board game-like gameplay in which the player traverses a map and uses magical, tablet-like "cards" to defeat their opponents by forcing them to land on specific spaces and pay a toll, similar to Monopoly. The player gains cards in the manner of a collectible card game. In the game's lore, people who are able to manipulate these cards, fragments of Culdcept, an eponymous all-powerful book of creation, are known as Cepters. The first game in the series, Culdcept, was released in 1997 on the Sega Saturn. The two most recent releases are Culdcept Begins, and a port of the original 1997 game entitled Culdcept The First.

== Games ==
Release timeline
1997	Culdcept (1997)
1998
1999	Culdcept Expansion
2000	Culdcept Expansion Plus
2001	Culdcept (2001)
2002	Culdcept II: Expansion
2003
2004
2005
2006	Culdcept Saga
2007
2008	Culdcept DS
2009
2010
2011
2012	Culdcept (Nintendo 3DS)
2013
2014
2015
2016	Culdcept Revolt
2017
2018
2019
2020
2021
2022
2023
2024
2025
2026	Culdcept Begins
2026	Culdcept The First

=== Culdcept (1997) ===
Culdcept's initial release was Japan-only on the Sega Saturn in 1997, and later, an upgraded port, Culdcept Expansion, was released on the PlayStation in 1999. This saw a re-release as Culdcept Expansion Plus in 2000. It was again ported to the Nintendo DS in 2008 as Culdcept DS. An enhanced port known as Culdcept The First was released on Steam by City Connection on July 30th, 2026. This version features a Rewind feature, Quick Save and Load, additional bonuses that increase the number of reward cards received at the end of a match, an option to Reveal Hands, and both Japanese and English language switching support.

=== Culdcept (2001)/Culdcept II ===
Culdcept II, the sequel to Culdcept, saw a Japan-only release on the Dreamcast in 2001, and an upgraded port, Culdcept II: Expansion, was released for the PlayStation 2 in 2002. The expansion was marketed in North America as Culdcept, and published by NEC Interchannel on December 4, 2003.

=== Culdcept Saga ===
Culdcept Saga was released for Xbox 360 in Japan in 2006, and North America in 2008, but never saw a PAL release. It is the first entry for a Microsoft console in the franchise.

=== Culdcept DS ===
Culdcept DS is a port of Culdcept, released on the Nintendo DS in 2008 and published by Sega.

=== Culdcept (Nintendo 3DS) ===
Culdcept for the Nintendo 3DS was released only in Japan by Nintendo on June 28, 2012. It is a remake of Culdcept II. The game became known for an advertising campaign featuring a businesslike female character named Cepko Culd (カルド・セプ子), played by actress Aya Shibata, who explained the game's rules and characters, but was seen as an unusual Nintendo "sex symbol" due to her erotic-sounding voice.

=== Culdcept Revolt ===
Culdcept Revolt was released on Nintendo 3DS by Nintendo in Japan in 2016, and by NIS America in North America, Europe and Australia in 2017. It is a sequel to Culdcept.

=== Culdcept Begins ===
Culdcept Begins (stylized as Culdcept BEGINS) is the latest Culdcept game released onto the Nintendo Switch, Nintendo Switch 2 and Steam by Neos Corporation. This game features a character named Kamru, who was selected for the Royal Cepter Guard Regiment and transferred to the Cept Academy, an institute located on Bavashka, a continent created by the gods. It features over 400 cards, and was released on July 16th 2026 for Nintendo Switch and Nintendo Switch 2, and was released later the same year on October 28th for PC.

== Other media ==
A series of manga books were released based on the original Culdcept. The manga is about an apprentice Cepter named Najaran (with her worrywart talking staff, Goligan) who helps save the Culdcept, the book which the goddess Culdra had kept all the cards in until the War of the Gods. The manga was adapted by Shinya Kaneko and serialized in Japan by Kodansha in Magazine Z, and collected in six bound volumes. It is licensed in English by Tokyopop.

== Common elements ==
=== Plot and themes ===
All Culdcept games take place in a shared fictional universe known as Culdra Space. It was initially created by the omnipotent goddess Culdra, with its first world being similar to Earth. She also created Culdcept, a book with the power of creation. However, one of her servants, the god Baltias, rebelled against her and tried to steal Culdcept, prompting the War of the Gods. As punishment, Culdra destroyed Culdcept, and its pages became cards. When the people of the world discovered the cards, the Cepters who could manipulate them began to fight for supremacy. When the strongest Cepter defeated Baltias, they gained the power of a god and the ability to create their own world.

The subsequent Culdcept games each take place in their own world, which was created by a champion of a former world, who rules over it as its god or goddess. This has caused exponential growth and a nigh-infinite amount of worlds to be created.

A recurring character is Goligan, a talking cane with the head of a man who serves as Culdra's messenger in seeking out Cepters to fulfill their destinies.

=== Gameplay ===
The gameplay of the Culdcept series is often described as a hybrid of Magic: The Gathering and Monopoly, in which players take turns traversing a game board filled with squares of varying elements or effects. Players first construct a deck of 50 monster, item or spell cards. When in the game itself, players roll a dice at the start of each turn, which determines how many spaces they can move. Landing on an unoccupied space allows the player to take control of it with a monster and grants them magical power. They can later spend power upgrading these lands, which further increases their total magic.

If a player lands on an occupied space, they can battle the foe there, and if they succeed, they will take control from the enemy. Or, they can choose to pay a toll without fighting the enemy. If the battle is lost, the toll must be paid regardless. Players earn points towards new card packs when playing in Story Mode, but the games also have a player versus player element in which multiple people can battle.

=== Soundtrack ===
While the original Culdcept was composed by Takeshi Yanagawa and Yuzo Koshiro, Kenji Ito became the primary or sole composer for many of the Culdcept games, starting with Culdcept Second and continuing on to the series' most recent entry, Culdcept Revolt. He regards the soundtrack of Culdcept Second, the first he composed after leaving Square, as his "best work".

== Reception ==
Overall, the series was praised for its deep strategic elements and unique gameplay, but received criticism for its high learning curve and level of difficulty, as well as its luck-based elements, leading to it being called a "niche" series. Mike Fahey of Kotaku called the gameplay's emphasis on luck "frustrating and humiliating, but also kind of exhilarating".
