= Culdcept Saga =

- Developers: OmiyaSoft, Jamsworks
- Publisher: Namco Bandai Games
- Artist: Midori Harada
- Writer: Tow Ubukata
- Composer: Kenji Ito
- Series: Culdcept
- Platform: Xbox 360
- Release: JP: November 22, 2006; NA: February 5, 2008
- Genres: Board game, Collectible card game
- Modes: Single-player, multiplayer

Culdcept Saga (カルドセプト サーガ, Karudoseputo Sāga) is a video game in the Culdcept series developed exclusively for the Xbox 360 video game console. It is the first entry for a Microsoft console in the franchise.

A demo of the title was made available to Xbox Live users on December 4, 2007. The demo includes two different pre-made card decks and supports both single player gameplay and local multiplayer for up to four players. Initially released in Japan in 2006, the full game wasn't released in North America until more than a year later, in February 2008, but has never been released in Europe or Australia.

== Story ==
As the game begins, the player-nameable "Boy" protagonist sells himself into slavery to help his struggling village. While departing the village with his new owner, the two encounter a mysterious woman carrying a deck of magical cards which respond powerfully to the young man's presence. As the woman, Princess Faustina, pleads with the slaver to release the boy (whom she refers to as "the savior"), all three are set upon by Rilara, a traveling bandit. It is here that the young man, controlled by the player, learns that he is actually a Cepter, a powerful individual who can control magical cards. Using cards borrowed from Faustina, he defeats Rilara and begins his journey towards becoming a master Cepter.

The protagonist is sold by the slaver to an arena, and must fight other Cepters to earn his freedom. When he finally does, Faustina takes him to her home, the Advatarian Empire. Her father tells her to go to the four neighboring elementally-themed lands and negotiate for peace. However, after they finish doing this, it is revealed that the king only did it as a ploy to launch an all-out attack. The protagonist must flee along with Faustina to avoid execution. Soon after, Faustina is kidnapped by High Priest Sapphius, one of the world's most powerful Cepters, who seeks to destroy the Empire and the world.

Too weak to resist the High Priest, the protagonist is forced to undergo the Trials, an ancient proving grounds for Cepters overseen by Diarna, a former Imperial knight who became a hermit. He passes them, despite the interference of Rilara, and becomes a true Cepter, learning that a Cepter's purpose is to reassemble the cards into Culdcept, the book of creation. Meanwhile, the High Priest attacks and destroys the Empire. The protagonist can choose to travel to the Northern or Southern Continent to face the High Priest, but, each time, Faustina perishes, either by the hand of the High Priest or his own. Both times, he reassembles Culdcept, and is granted the power of a god by the world's goddess Zeromn, but he chooses to return to the past, as he finds creating a world pointless without Faustina alive.

Finally, the protagonist is able to choose a third option, going to the island between the continents. There, aided by Rilara, who has now become a true Cepter herself, the protagonist convinces Faustina, who had joined the High Priest, to rejoin him, and fights Sapphius. It is revealed that Sapphius was being manipulated by Baltias, an evil god who cast a curse on Culdcept. The protagonist defeats Baltias, and both he and Faustina become gods together, finally creating a new world.

== Gameplay ==
Drawing a card at the start of a turn.

As in Monopoly, players in Culdcept Saga roll dice and move around a game board, attempting to claim spaces and assess fees against other Cepters who land there. Unlike Monopoly, squares are claimed by summoning creatures to guard them, and players who land on them can opt to challenge this creature with one of their own rather than pay the toll. If successful, the challenger claims ownership of the square. The winner of the game is the first player to return to the starting location after amassing a sufficient quantity of magic/mana.

=== Cards ===
Creatures are summoned from customized decks ("books") of cards which players design ahead of time from their available pool of cards. Other cards in these decks bestow items to temporarily enhance creature abilities, or represent spells which can influence players or locations on the game board. The standard gameplay options fix the size of each deck at 50 cards, although this is customizable during multiplayer matches.

There are nearly 500 different cards in total, but players must earn the majority of these through skillful play and story mode progression before they can be used. Cards are earned simply for completing a match, regardless of whether one wins or loses, although the winner earns a greater number of cards than the opponent(s).

=== Strategy ===
While the game relies somewhat heavily on luck, strategy and planning play a strong role as well. Players have a choice over what cards make up their decks, as well as when to play those cards. The squares in the game consist of different terrain or elemental types (fire, earth, water, or air), and a creature's defense power is raised when the element of the square is in accordance with the placed color of the creature there. Also the offensive capabilities of creatures can be bolstered by deploying them on an aligned square. Several more powerful creatures can only be summoned when a certain number of squares of a given terrain type are already controlled.

Players must also decide when to upgrade the squares which they currently control. Upgraded squares exact higher magic tolls than non-upgraded squares when landed on.

=== New features ===
As a title in the roughly decade-old Culdcept series, Culdcept Saga expands upon and refines the existing gameplay concept without radically altering it. While more than 300 cards were included from the previous title, some of these were tweaked for balance, and over 100 new cards were added. New features include support for online multiplayer play against up to three other players via Xbox Live, complete with leaderboards and rankings. If desired, custom rules for such online matches can be defined in order to modify the experience. Also new to the series is the ability to unlock various items with which to graphically customize in-game avatars.

Other improvements include high-resolution graphics, now rendered (at least partially) in 3D.

== Development ==
The story for Culdcept Saga was written by Tow Ubukata, a science fiction and anime author.

The main composer for the game's music was Kenji Ito, who worked previously on titles such as those in the SaGa series, as well as earlier Culdcept installments. The massive soundtrack spans 4 CDs, and while not released outside Japan in any physical format, is available on iTunes. Card artwork was provided by a large number of different artists from across Japan, each using their own style and imagination to come up with appropriate illustrations. The time required for the artists to complete their work and then have the images imported into the game totalled over a year.

== Reception ==
Reception

Aggregate score
| Aggregator | Score |
|---|---|
| Metacritic | 75/100 |

Review scores
| Publication | Score |
|---|---|
| Destructoid | 7.5/10 |
| Electronic Gaming Monthly | 7.83/10 |
| Famitsu | 34/40 (X360) 32/40 |
| Game Informer | 7/10 |
| GamePro | 3.75/5 |
| GameRevolution | B |
| GameSpot | 8/10 |
| GameSpy | 3.5/5 |
| GameTrailers | 7.9/10 |
| GameZone | 7.9/10 |
| Hardcore Gamer | 3.5/5 |
| IGN | 6.5/10 |
| Official Xbox Magazine (US) | 7/10 |

The game received "generally favorable reviews" according to the review aggregation website Metacritic. In Japan, Famitsu gave it a score of 34 out of 40, while Famitsu X360 gave it a score of one nine, two eights, and one seven for a total of 32 out of 40.

IGN commented that game length can be quite excessive (4+ hours for a single match with multiple opponents) and that the game never really moves too far beyond the core "roll dice, play creature" mechanics. However, they later named the game one of the "hidden gems" of 2008. GameSpy shared concerns about the lengthy time required per match, and noted that the game could be quite frustrating when luck wasn't on one's side, although the review did note that the game included a "clever mix of strategy and good old-fashioned luck". Both reviews expressed dismay and confusion over the way the game routinely shows what cards are in player's hands, observing that this limits elements of strategic surprise. 1Up.com, however, praised its depth and online play.

Culdcept Saga sold 27,960 units in Japan as of November 30, 2008.

GameSpot nominated it for Best Game No One Played. Gaming Target selected it as one of their "40 Games We'll Still Be Playing From 2008."
