= Sanctum (1998 video game) =

1998 video game

- Developer: Digital Addiction
- Artist: Lee Moyer
- Platform: Microsoft Windows
- Release: July 9, 1998
- Genre: Collectible card game
- Mode: Multiplayer

Sanctum is a digital collectible card game, played online against opponents. Players log into a game lobby, known as "The Gate", to find other players to challenge to a match. It runs on the Windows operating system. It was developed by Digital Addiction in 1997, and was launched to public participation on July 9, 1998. At its peak, the game had over 1200 active participants (who logged in at least twice weekly over a period of three months). Registered users reached 82,000 by 1999, and by May, 2000 had over 100 thousand registered users. It was one of the first online trading card games, and received many favorable reviews.

The virtual "collectible cards" include common, uncommon, and rare, with different powers, in-game functions and artwork. They do not exist as actual physical cards (with the exception of a few that were distributed by Digital Addiction for promotional purposes) but they are owned and traded in an online account, and are played solely within the virtual environment of Sanctum. A registered player is given a certain number of free cards to play, and additional cards can be purchased through the online card store.

== Gameplay ==
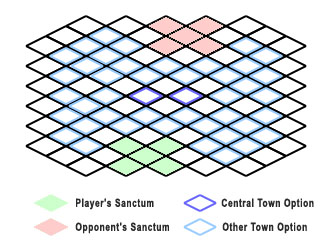
Sanctum grid

The goal of each player is to defend their sanctum from encroachment by their opponent. If a player manages to get some of their units into the opponent's sanctum, the game is over with that player declared the winner.

The game is played on a diagonally aligned grid of square tiles. The player's home base appears in the bottom rows, taking up five squares in a plus-sign shape; the opponent's sanctum similarly was located in the top rows. Five towns are placed on the board, one in one of the two center squares, and each pair of the other four are located closer to one sanctum than the other. No two towns are closer than two spaces apart, and each player's sanctum was the same number of moves to its closest town, and so on, such that no player has a tactical advantage from town placement. The rest of the squares of the grid are randomly assigned one of the basic terrain types: plains, forest, desert, water, swampland or mountains.

Sanctums and towns produce one of six "mana" types every turn (Clarity, Mystery, Order, Strife, Will, and World), with sanctums only able to produce the type of mana associated with the house the player utilized, while towns can be dedicated to any mana of the player's choice. Players assemble "decks" out of their virtual cards. Each card has a cost in mana, and has varying effects. Each player is dealt five cards out of their decks, and can cast as many in their turn as their mana allows, as well as discard up to one. At the end of their turn, a player's hand is replenished to five cards.

Towns and sanctums also periodically produce novices every so many turns (every other turn for towns, and every fourth turn for sanctums). These are trained as Swordsmen or Archers to fight for their player, to attack monsters summoned by the enemy, to capture towns, or ultimately to capture the enemy Sanctum. These units can stack in groups of up to eight, and individuals or entire groups can be affected by various spells.

== Development ==
Sanctum was developed by Digital Addiction, starting in 1996. Released on July 9, 1998, it was one of the first online collectible card games.

The original development team included artist Lee Moyer, programmer Ethan Ham, and programmer and author Benjamin Rosenbaum. Rosenbaum's World Fantasy Award-nominated story "A Siege of Cranes" is set in the game's universe.

In 2000, Digital Addiction closed its doors. Faced with the prospect of the game vanishing, several players created the non-profit company Nioga ("Non-profit International Online Gaming Association") and acquired the game-related assets of Digital Addiction with the intent of keeping it running for its players. The Nioga members intended to donate all game profits (generated through the sale of virtual cards) to charity. Nioga maintained the game and released an expansion set, Revolutions.

Over time, player retention and game revenues dwindled. The non-profit status of Nioga was eventually canceled. On June 1, 2010, the Sanctum servers were shut down at the co-location facility.

In January 2012 a new community effort to make the Sanctum game available for play was started. On February 17, 2014, it launched a new expansion set, Allies and Traitors.

== Reception ==
Daniel Erickson reviewed the game for Next Generation, rating it four stars out of five, and stated that "A terrific and addictive online strategy game."
