= Card Hunter =

2013 video game

- Developers: Blue Manchu (former); The Knights of U
- Publishers: Blue Manchu (former); The Knights of U
- Designers: Jon Chey; Joe McDonagh; Dorian Hart; Effie Schwartz
- Artist: Ben Lee
- Writer: Joe McDonagh
- Engine: Adobe Flash
- Platforms: Web browser, Microsoft Windows, OS X
- Release: Web browser September 12, 2013; Microsoft Windows, OS X July 13, 2015
- Genres: Tactical CCG and tabletop game hybrid
- Modes: Single-player, Multiplayer

Card Hunter is a browser-based flash game that combines elements of a digital collectible card game with a table-top board game.

The game is developed by Blue Manchu Games headed by Irrational Games co-founder, Jon Chey. The development team also consists of other former Irrational Games and Looking Glass Studios employees, as well as consultants who previously worked on Magic: The Gathering. It was initially released as a web-browser based game in September 2013, with a standalone client released for Microsoft Windows and OS X in July 2015. On December 22, 2020, Blue Manchu transferred ownership of the game to The Knights of U, at the time known as The Knights of Unity, who are continuing to update and maintain the game.

== Gameplay ==
Card Hunter is presented to the player as a gaming session with gamemaster Gary who is guiding the player through a tabletop role-playing game, using dungeon modules similar to those of Dungeons & Dragons which consist of 1 or more encounters. Part of this fiction is Gary himself is still learning the ropes; at the start of the player's career, Gary is using his older brother Melvin's more powerful characters to demonstrate the core mechanics of the game, but later his brother takes these away, forcing Gary and the player to start anew.

The player generates a party of up to three characters; more characters can be recruited and swapped in and out between modules. Characters are selected by class, which determine equipment type they can use, and race, which grant special bonuses during combat. Each character has a deck of 36 cards which are determined by class, race, and their current equipment. Initially, the amount of equipment each character carries is limited, but as the characters gain experience points, they gain more equipment slots, expanding the abilities through new cards that enter their deck, allowing players to customize their characters. Equipment can only be swapped out between battles, and various stores, with both normal stock and time-limited exclusives, can be used to buy and sell equipment and treasure at this time. Card Hunter has a microtransaction ability to spend real-world money as to gain access to better loot from the end of encounters or to open prize chests that contain random equipment. As such, the game is considered to combine the collectible card aspects of Magic the Gathering with the role-player concepts of Dungeons & Dragons.

Once ready, the player selects one of the available modules in the campaign that they have access to, including revisiting completed modules. Modules are given difficulty levels, with more difficult modules featuring stronger enemies but also having more powerful randomly determined loot to be collected at the end of each encounter and more experience awarded at the end of the module.

Card Hunter uses a tabletop board metaphor to represent combat. The player's characters (on bottom) and Gary's characters (top) use cards to determine how to move about the board.

Each encounter is played out on a rectangular game board typical of a tabletop game, with the player's and Gary's characters represented as stand-up game pieces. At the start, each character is dealt four cards from their shuffled deck. The player and Gary take turns playing one card from any of their controlled characters, which allow the character to move, attack, or cast spells; these actions take into account the layout of the gameboard, such as line-of-sight and rough terrain that slows movement. Other cards are passive, such as cards that may block attacks. Cards may provide other effects, such as buffs or persistent effects. Once a card is played, it generally returns to a discard pile, though certain passive cards are retained. The player or Gary may pass instead of playing a card or may have run out of cards; the round continues until both the player and Gary have both passed. At this point a new round is started; if a character holds more than two cards, they must discard down to two, and then each character is dealt new cards (typically three) from their deck, reshuffled from the discard pile as needed. Combat continues until either side earns enough victory points to win. Victory points are awarded typically when an enemy character is defeated, but other victory conditions can exist.

In addition to the single-player campaign, there is a player-vs-player mode, where players take their current characters or preset characters sets into battle against each other. With the release of the standalone client in July 2015, the game added a new expansion which added science-fiction related adventures and items, and included co-operative play with either two or three players. In this mode, each player controls one character; if only two players, there is no third character but each player gets an extra card to draw to make up for this. The players can work through one complete adventure together.

The game is supported by microtransactions provided by buying a separate in-game currency called "pizza" for real money. The pizza can be used to purchase new cutouts which change the cosmetic look of one's character, chests which contain random items, or gold. A subscription model is also available, where players can spend pizza to join the "Card Hunters Club", membership to which grants an additional loot item after each battle.

== Development ==
Blue Manchu Games was formed by Chey after he left Irrational Games, which had been sold to 2K Games and re-branded as 2K Australia. Chey formed Blue Manchu as a self-funded studio with the intention of creating games that interested him, and had no provable mass appeal so it would be difficult to attract investors. Work began in August 2010, and the game was developed in secret until being announced in July 2011.

The team working on Card Hunter began as a distributed organisation with Chey as the only full-time employee.

== Reception ==
Jerry Holkins (Tycho) of Penny Arcade selected Card Hunter as his favourite game of PAX 2012.
