= Magi-Nation Duel =

Collectible card game

- Cardback to the Magi Nation card game.
- Designers: Philip Tavel, Josh Lytle, and Dan Tibbles
- Publishers: Interactive Imagination
- Players: 2 to as many that want to play
- Playing time: Approx 1 hour
- Chance: Some(order of cards drawn, dice)
- Age range: 10+
- Skills: Card playing Arithmetic; Basic Reading Ability

Magi-Nation Duel, sometimes abbreviated "MND" or simply Magi-Nation, is a collectible card game (CCG) published by Interactive Imagination Corp (2i) in October 2000.

== History and development ==
MND was previewed at Gen Con 2000 and was released in October 2000. Lead Designer and Co-Founder of 2i Phillip Tavel created a game with mechanics which resembled and were partially based on Magic: The Gathering, while much of the flavor of the game was based on the anime-style artwork of Matt Holmberg. Greg Richardson Von Oy (the other original Co-Founder of 2i) and Josh Lytle (a former professional gamer) helped to playtest and finalize the original design of the game. Several manga-style American artists led by Art Director: Thomas Cook include Matt Holmberg, Rich Werner (Main character designer for Kybar's Teeth, Weave, Paradwyn, Bograth, Nar and The Sands of Dresh), Tim Gillette, Chana Goodman, and Ryan Shreve helped to expand the universe of art based on the original creations of Matt Holmberg. The game was originally designed as a bridge between Pokémon and Magic: The Gathering. The idea was that younger players whose first game was Pokémon would eventually seek out a new game to play and that Magic: The Gathering might be too complex for some players, leaving a void in the market between the two massively popular card games. The game is now out of print. A new version of the game, licensed by Cookie Jar, was to be released in 2008, but no relaunch ever surfaced.

The game had an active following which later released a number of cards 2i had in development, as well as a number of fan cards. These cards were previously found at CCGWorkshop, however as of January 2008, they no longer available as 2i had requested their removal. In February 2024, 2i partnered with retailer Arcanist’s Armory to launch a Kickstarter campaign to fund the printing of a previously unreleased set called Traitor’s Reach alongside new cards. The campaign raised over $250,000, with the set due for release in 2026.

== Expansions ==
The first card set, which is also known as Limited, contained 190 cards and introduced five "regions" of the larger world called the "Moonlands": Arderial, Cald, Naroom, Orothe, and Underneath. A reprint of the base set, known as Unlimited, was released in February 2001. This set contained a full parallel set of "foil" premium cards, whereas the base set only had foil versions of selected cards.

Four additional sets were originally created as expansions to the game, designed by Dan Tibbles and Stephen McLaughlin:

- Awakening (142 cards, released May 2001)
- Dream's End (185 cards, released November 2001)
- Nightmare's Dawn (300 cards, released April 2002)
- Voice of the Storms (300 cards, released November 2002)

== Other media ==
In an attempt to popularize the brand, 2i also developed a Game Boy Color role-playing video game cartridge, titled Magi Nation. A sequel, Magi Nation: Invasion, was in development for the Game Boy Advance (GBA), but production ceased for an undisclosed reason.

Magi Nation: Keeper's Quest is a puzzle game, produced originally for the Game Boy Color, but never released on that platform. Instead, it was released for Palm PDAs and Verizon and Handango cell phones.

=== Animation ===
In 2002, a Magi-Nation animated series was announced to be in development by Keller Productions and Pastis Television International, with the intent to launch at least 26 episodes in fall 2003. The licensing agreement to produce the Magi-Nation animated series was finalized in September 2005 with a multinational studio. In October 2006, Cookie Jar Entertainment confirmed production of its animated adaptation of the Magi-Nation series. In February 2007, it was officially announced that Cookie Jar Entertainment's Magi-Nation had been picked up by Kids WB! in the United States and by CBC in Canada. There was an initial production run of 26 episodes. The series was a Canada-Korea co-production.

== Reviews ==
- Family Games: The 100 Best
