= Tabletop Simulator =

2015 video game

- Developer: Berserk Games
- Publisher: Berserk Games
- Designer: Jason Henry
- Artists: Kimiko (2D art/PR); Henrique Lopes (3D art); Lawrence Steele (Sound)
- Engine: Unity
- Platforms: Microsoft Windows, Linux, OS X
- Release: June 5, 2015
- Genre: Tabletop game simulation
- Modes: Single-player, multiplayer

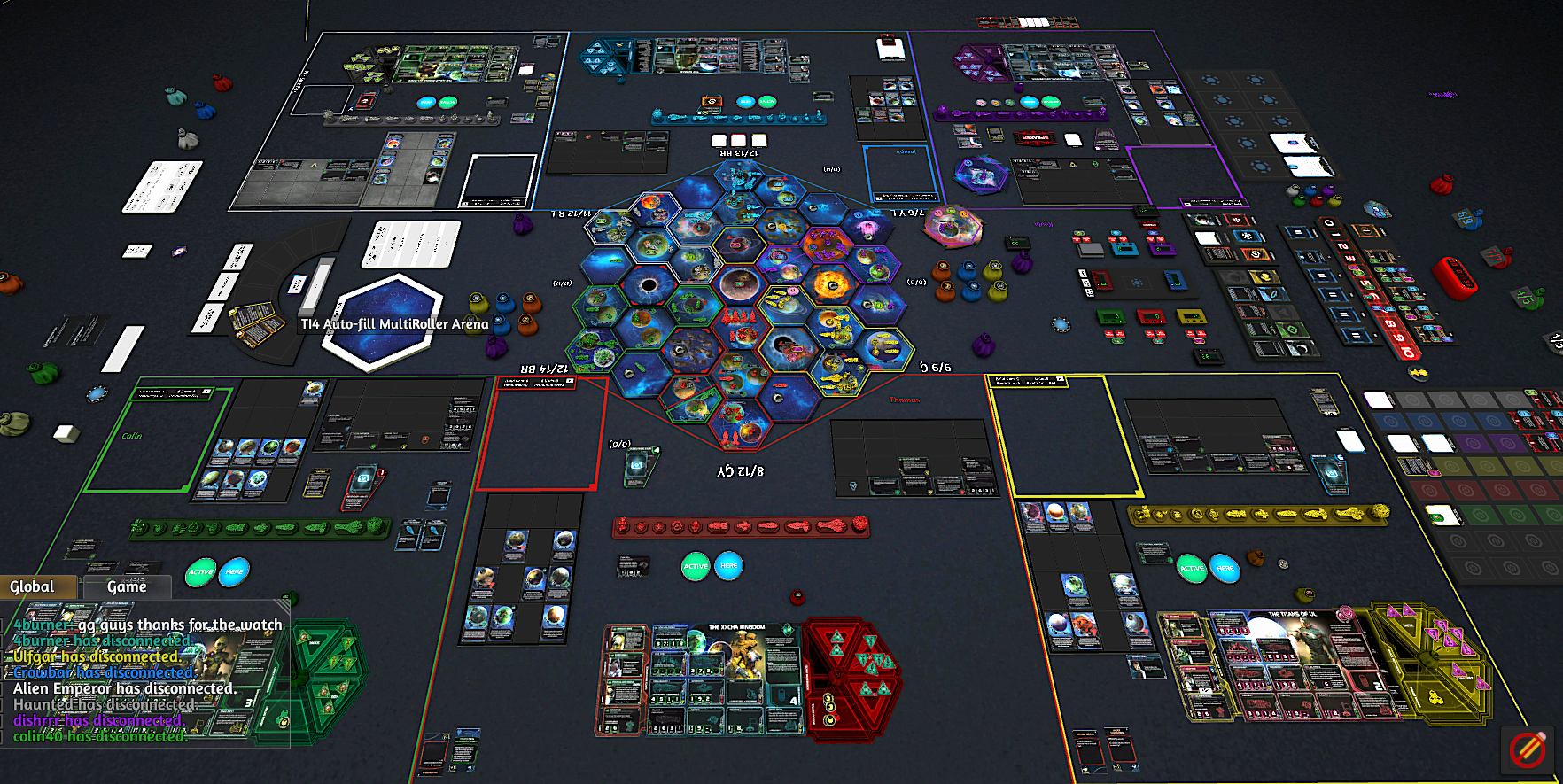
Twilight Imperium fourth edition as implemented in Tabletop Simulator

Tabletop Simulator is an independent video game that allows players to play and create tabletop games in a multiplayer physics sandbox. Developed by Berserk Games as their first title after a successful crowdfunding campaign in February 2014, the game was released in June of the following year.

== Gameplay ==
Tabletop Simulator is a player-driven physics sandbox, without set victory or failure conditions. After selecting a table to play on, players interact with the game by spawning and moving virtual pieces, which are subject to a physics simulation. Online multiplayer is supported with a maximum of ten players. Aside from spawning and moving pieces, the game includes mechanics to assist with common styles of board game play, such as automatic dice rolling and hiding players' pieces from one another; other mechanics aid in administrating a game, for example saving the state of the board or undoing moves.

Several games are included, including chess, checkers and poker. Tables and pieces can be mixed and customized to create new games, which can then be saved to share and play with others. The game allows images and models to be imported to create entirely new pieces and tables, allowing for the recreation of most real-world board games. Over three-thousand games and custom assets are shared on the game's Steam Workshop; while there is original content, a notable number of these shared items are adaptations of existing games, including unlicensed derivatives of copyrighted works. Berserk Games has also worked with a number of game publishers to offer officially-licensed Tabletop Simulator versions of their games as downloadable content, such as Cosmic Encounter.

== Development ==
Tabletop Simulator was developed by Berserk Games, a studio consisting of Jason Henry and Kimiko. Before forming Berserk Games, Henry attended college focusing on engineering, while working on game mods in his spare time, including the popular Mana Warfare mod for Chivalry: Medieval Warfare. Kimiko had been a community moderator for Chivalry and later a member of Torn Banner Studios. In an interview with Gamasutra, the pair described the game Desperate Gods as being an inspiration, though they wanted to expand the "free-form shared board game" concept to cover all tabletop games.

In a crowdfunding campaign that began in February 2014, Tabletop Simulator earned US$37,403 on Kickstarter with the backing of 1,822 individuals. On March 15, Berserk Games announced that they had successfully passed through Steam Greenlight, allowing them to distribute the game on Steam.

== January 2022 controversy ==
In January 2022, a transgender user was temporarily banned from the game's global chat for referring to herself as trans and gay. She then made a complaint to Berserk Games. On January 8, they responded with a statement that "Tabletop Simulator supports the LGBTQ+ community", then issued a formal apology to the user. On January 9, Berserk Games removed the global chat feature from the game. On January 14, Berserk Games made a $10000 donation to the National Center for Transgender Equality. Berserk Games's moderation decisions in this incident resulted in review bombing on their Steam page.
