= Dinosaur King =

2005 card-based arcade game

- Arcade flyer

古代王者恐竜(こだいおうじゃきょうりゅう)キング
- Video game
- Developer: Sega
- Publisher: Sega
- Genre: Digital collectible card game
- Platform: Arcade
- Released: 2005
- Other media
- Dinosaur King (TV series); Dinosaur King (video game)

Dinosaur King (Note: Japanese: 古代王者恐竜キング, Hepburn: Kodai Ōja Kyōryū Kingu; lit. 'Ancient Ruler Dinosaur King') is a 2005 card-based arcade video game from Sega that uses similar gameplay mechanics to Mushiking. The game was revealed in JAMMA 2005. A Nintendo DS version was also later released.

In the fall of 2008, Upper Deck Company released a Dinosaur King Trading Card Game. This card game is likely to be confused with the cards used for the arcade machines.

The series has been adapted into an anime television series produced by Sunrise, Ancient Ruler Dinosaur King DKidz Adventure (Note: 古代王者恐竜キング Dキッズ・アドベンチャー, Kodai Ōja Kyōryū Kingu Dī Kizzu Adobenchā) that aired between February 4, 2007, and January 27, 2008, in Japan. A second series called Ancient Ruler Dinosaur King DKidz Adventure: Pterosaur Legend (Note: 古代王者恐竜キング Dキッズ・アドベンチャー翼龍伝説, Kodai Ōja Kyōryū Kingu Dī Kizzu Adobenchā: Yokuryū Densetsu) aired between February 3 and August 31, 2008, in Japan. Upon its airing, the anime received mixed to positive reviews from critics.

== Plot and characters ==
=== Card game/Nintendo DS game ===
Dr. Spike Taylor was on a paleontology mission in Africa with his son Max and his friend Rex. Max discovers stone slabs and finds dinosaurs are calling them for help. An evil organization called the "Alpha Gang", led by the nefarious Dr. Z, traveled back in time to hunt down the dinosaurs and use them to take over the world. It is up to Max and Rex to travel around the world, defeating Dr. Z and the Alpha Gang while hunting down the dinosaurs (later, the story varies as the arcade game machine keeps on upgrading).

=== Anime ===
In the first season, Max Taylor and his friends Rex Owen and Zoe Drake form the D-team in an effort to control the dinosaur cards. Max controls a male Triceratops named Chomp, Zoe controls a female Parasaurolophus named Paris, and Rex controls a male Carnotaurus named Ace.

The three are opposed by the Alpha Gang, a group from 2126 AD who desire to control the dinosaur cards and the six tablets in order to control the world. Ursula is the boss of the group, and a running gag is her ability to hear the phrase "old lady" from anywhere in the world. Ursula controls a male Tyrannosaurus named Terry.

Zander pays for the equipment, has a crush on Zoe's older sister, Reese, and controls a male Spinosaurus named Spiny. Ed is slow to understand things, is shorter, often jinxes the team by predicting good fortunes or likely bad outcomes, and controls a female Saichania named Tank.

== Media ==
=== Anime ===
The series was adapted into an anime television series, Ancient Ruler Dinosaur King DKidz Adventure (Note: 古代王者恐竜キング Dキッズ・アドベンチャー, Kodai Ōja Kyōryū Kingu Dī Kizzu Adobenchā), which is made by Sunrise and premiered on TV Asahi on February 4, 2007. In late 2007, an English adaptation aired on the 4Kids TV block on Fox, but moved to The CW's The CW4Kids block on September 6, 2008. Reruns of the series began airing on KidsClick from February 5 to August 24, 2018. Distribution of the series was handled for television by 20th Television, and for physical media first by Shout! Factory for three 5-episode DVD volumes from September 23, 2008, to June 30, 2009. Discotek Media released the series on two SD Blu-ray sets for each season on November 27, 2018. After its airing, the anime received a range of mixed to positive reviews from critics.

==== First season ====
Max Taylor is the son of paleontologist Dr. Spike Taylor. After falling out of bed early one morning and witnessing a meteor fall from the sky, Max sets out with his friends Rex Owen and Zoe Drake into a forest where the meteor had crashed. They find stones with the symbols for lightning, wind, and grass on them and a card with a picture of a Triceratops on it. The Triceratops that is later named Chomp is accidentally activated when Max rubs the card on the stone. The D-Team meet their new enemies in the Alpha Gang consisting of Dr. Z, Ursula, Zander, Ed, Seth, Laura, Rod, Helga, and the Alpha Droids. The Alpha Gang plans to obtain the Dinosaur Cards that were lost when their time machine exploded and stranded them in the present. Rex activated a Carnotaurus card which was named Ace and Zoe activated a Parasaurolophus which was named Paris. The D-Team and Alpha Gang often clash for possession of dinosaurs that are activated when their cards are activated. In the finale, Seth turns on his comrades with his Black Tyrannosaurus which is ultimately defeated. Seth attempts to bring Chomp back to the past which fails and Seth is sent into the past alone. The D-Team surrender their dinosaurs to Rex's original parents, with many tears.

==== Second season ====
In the second series, the Alpha Gang and the Ancients return. While the parents are talking, they are kidnapped by Gavro, a member of the Spectral Space Pirates. This causes the Alpha Gang and D-Team to join forces against the Space Pirates in their plot to obtain cosmic jewels known as the Cosmos Stones. Seth later returns as an ally to the Spectral Space Pirates after they saved him from the time portal. Spectre, the leader of the Space Pirates, provides the dinosaur cards. In episode 75, Seth seems to become a traitor as he appeals to the D-Team for help saying that they forced him to help them, but it was really a trick to get the two Cosmos Stones in D-Team's control, despite the fact that he attacks and defeats his comrades two episodes later. In the end although the Spectral Space Pirates manage to catch all seven Cosmos Stones, Seth and the Pterosaur defeat the Black Pterosaur. Rex, his parents, and the Alpha Gang leave to their own time as the Spectral Space Pirates are floating around in a pod.

=== Video game ===
A video game based on the series was released by Sega for the Nintendo DS on September 23, 2008.

=== Other media ===
The Dinosaur King Trading Card game was released in the fall of 2008 by the Upper Deck Company. Although the play mechanism follows the arcade game cards to some extent, they are not meant to be mixed.

The manga was released by Shogakukan.
