= Magi Nation (video game) =

- Developer: Interactive Imagination
- Publisher: Epoch Co.
- Platforms: Game Boy Color; Game Boy Advance
- Release: Game Boy Color: NA: March 2, 2001; Game Boy Advance: JP: December 12, 2002
- Genre: Role-playing
- Mode: Single-player

Magi Nation is a 2001 video game for the Game Boy Color developed by American studio Interactive Imagination. It is based on the collectible card game Magi-Nation Duel.

== Gameplay ==
Magi Nation involves taming dream creatures and using them to fight. Whenever a creature is defeated, the player may receive that creature's animite, a magical stone containing its essence. These can later be used to forge rings which allow the player to summon during the battle. Each Magi may summon up to four dream creatures at a time, and with up to ten rings equipped, ten dream creatures total at their disposal. Magi are able to fight on their own, casting spells or regenerating energy.

== Plot ==
Magi Nation follows Tony Jones, a timid human teenage boy, who has just recently moved into a new town. Upon meeting the local kids, they coerce him into entering a cave that they themselves are too frightened to enter. Tony explores the cave, and upon picking up a crystal, the cave collapses, and when he awakes from unconsciousness, he finds himself in a new, strange world. In a forest area, he summons a dream creature from the crystal and meets a man named Eidon. He is escorted to the city of Vash Naroom, located in a network of tree canopies and constructed of wood. His basic questions of the nature of this world are explained. Soon after his arrival, a menacing dungeon erupts from the ground in a nearby forest (called Shadow Geysers). In the following events, Tony is mistaken for a prophesied hero named "Magus Kyros" and, with no other option, he ventures across this new world, searching for the means by which he can return home.

Once the threatening Shadow Geyser appears in the Glade, an area east of Vash Naroom, Tony follows Eidon and Orwin, the elder of Vash Naroom, to inspect the dark structure. Orwin is fatally wounded by the dark powers of the Geyser, and is almost captured by the two bumbling Dark Magi, Zet and Korg. After consulting the somewhat questionable Seer, Tony discovers that the only way to save Orwin, Tony's only hope for returning home, is to find the rare Cloud Frond.

Tony travels to an area west of the Naroom Forest known as the Weave, and finds the home of Gia, the wise old woman whom Eidon trains under. She gives Tony the Core Glyph, and is surprised when he is able to hold the artefact without experiencing severe pain. This event leads her to believe that Tony may be the legendary Magus Kyros, who was prophesied to return to Magi Nation in a time of great peril. Tony then sets out to investigate the Naroom Shadow Geyser, which is full of Core Dream Creatures. Tony engages in a duel with Togoth, a Dark Magi who was supposed to protect what he calls the Core Gate, and afterwards escapes the crumbling Geyser with a Core Stone, one of four stones used to activate the Core Glyph and reach the Core. When the Geyser disappears, Tony notices a mysterious hooded figure that quickly disappears into a cave, who we later discover to be Morag, the leader of Agram's Dark Magi.

Tony then decides to travel to the Underneath in order to find the last three Core Stones which, according to Gia, should help him to access the Core and return to his home in Tavel Gorge. While in the Naroom Forest, he saves a young man named Wence from an attacking Agovo, who later ends up saving Tony's life. Tony arrives at the Underneath Town and meets several characters, including Gogor, the self-centered "hero" of the town, Motash, the village elder, and Ulk, the sister of Gruk and a good friend of Wence. Outside of town lies Gruk's mushfarm, where Tony ventures to help her resolve the strange noises coming from her basement. Tony arrives and is unable to save her from being kidnapped by Zet and Korg, who later make ridiculous demands to the Underneath townspeople in exchange for Gruk. Tony and Gogor travel to the abandoned fort, where they help free Gruk from her imprisonment.

Not soon after, a Shadow Geyser rises from Gruk's mushfarm, severely hurting her in the process. Motash realizes that Tony is the great Magus Kyros, and implores him to destroy the Geyser and then leave the Underneath. Tony once again picks his way through this Geyser, and after a battle with the Dark Magi Ogar, he receives another Core Stone and destroys the dark tower. However, he arrives back to town to see that the entire place has been destroyed by Morag and his Dark Magi. Morag turns Motash into a snake, and easily defeats Tony when he is approached. Tony is saved at the last moment by Wence, who shoots an arrow at Morag and scares him away.

After waking up from his faint in Wence's house, Tony returns to Gia's hut and tells her the terrible news about the Underneath. Suddenly, Morag, Korg, and Zet arrive and kidnap Tony, who is taken to the fiery Cald region. Morag uses another Core Stone to create a third Shadow Geyser, one surrounded by a lake of lava. He retreats before throwing Tony in the lava when a group of Caldlings arrive on the scene. Ashgar, the village elder, and the others accuse Tony of creating the Shadow Geyser. They are interrupted when panicked citizens announce that the town is under attack by Dark Magi. Tony quickly steps in and, with the help of the bridge builder Valkan, defeats the Shadow Magi. The townspeople apologize for accusing Tony, and ask that he quickly dispose of the Geyser.

Tony seeks the help of Valkan, who agrees to help build a bridge across the lava so Tony can reach the Geyser. As soon as the bridge is completed, however, it collapses into the lava. The embarrassed Valkan begs that Tony not tell anyone about the incident, in order to preserve his reputation, and tells Tony that he can jump over the lava with Agadon's Boots, which are kept locked up in a Vault in Orothe. After stealing the key to the vault from Ashgar's house, Tony travels aboard a ferry to the island of Orothe. Deep in the caves beneath the island he meets Blu, a lonely pirate who guards the vault. Tony unlocks the vault and retrieves the Boots, and also receives a horn from Blu in thanks for relieving him of his post as the vault guard. Blu tells Tony that if he is ever in danger, he can use to horn to call for help.

Tony then returns to the Cald Shadow Geyser and, using the boots, jumps over the lava and enters the tower. Tony defeats the Shadow Magi Korremar and receives the third Core Stone. In celebration of the destruction of the Shadow Geyser, the Caldlings hold a party for Tony. During a play about the heroism of Tony Jones, Morag appears and kidnaps Tony. Depending on how the player responds to the scenario, Morag may or may not kill two girls that Tony knows. Either way, Tony is taken to Shadowhold.

In the Shadowhold, Tony is placed in a cell as a prisoner. With assistance from an unknown aid, Tony is able to escape his cell in the Shadowhold, but finds himself cornered by Shadow Magi at the edge of the Shadowhold, next to the sea. Unable to swim, but desperate, Tony blows the horn Blu had given to him earlier and dives off of the edge of the fortress. Blu conveniently arrives and gives Tony a belt that allows him to swim and breath underwater, before leading him to Orothe, which is actually an undersea city resting on giant turtles.

Tony learns that a Shadow Geyser has appeared in Orothe, and all attempts to enter it have failed due to a barrier. Fearing for their safety, the denizens of the city have nearly all moved to calmer waters. Tony searches nearby ruins and learns a new spell that allows him to disable the barrier and enter the Shadow Geyser as the remaining Orotheans leave the area. Tony enters the Shadow Geyser and confronts Warrada, the Shadow Magi guardian of the geyser. Warrada offers to give Tony the Core Stone if he would simply stay out of their way. Regardless of Tony's choice, Tony obtains the Core Stone and returns to Gia, who has fled to Vash Naroom after her home was destroyed.

Gia explains that Tony is not the Great Magus Kyros, and that his mere presence in the realm has allowed an ancient enemy of the Magi, Agram, to return. Tony agrees to leave after sorrowful urging from Gia, and heads to the Core Gate near the remains of Gia's old home. After activating the Core Glyph, Tony appears to return home, but is actually ambushed by Korg and Zet. Tony engages and defeats both Korg and Zet, before winged beings descend and tell Tony that a Shadow Geyser has appeared in Arderial, their home territory that sits atop the clouds, and that Shadow Magi are terrorizing everyone. Wondering how another geyser appeared, Tony agrees to meet with the Arderial queen, Jaela.

Tony meets with Jaela, but the conversation is interrupted by the appearance of Morag, who has a small scuffle with the queen before Agram appears himself and causes Jaela to vanish. Agram attempts to explain himself to Tony, who angrily vows that he will stop Agram no matter what. Intrigued, Agram tells Tony that if he can defeated Morag in the Arderial Shadow Geyser, Agram will be waiting in the Core for Tony. Tony enters the Shadow Geyser and defeats Morag, gaining a fifth Core Stone.

Tony heads back to the Core, seeing hundreds of petrified people, including those he has met along his journey, along the way. Tony confronts Agram and, after an intense battle, defeats him. After Agram's defeat, the petrified people are returned to normal, and Jaela tells Tony that he may step into the light in Agram's throne room to return home. Tony returns home and is accepted by the group that sent him into the cave. Back in Magi Nation, a funeral is held for Orwin in Vash Naroom (or a party, if Orwin is saved during the game). It is optional to refuse to step into the light by trying to leave the throne room, in which case Tony can attend the funeral (or party).

== Reception ==
Reception

Aggregate score
Aggregator	Score
GameRankings	86%

Review scores
Publication	Score
Electronic Gaming Monthly	8/10
Famitsu	(GBA) 22/40
Game Informer	8.75/10
Nintendo Power	4/5

The Game Boy Color version received "favorable" reviews according to the review aggregation website GameRankings. In Japan, Famitsu gave the Game Boy Advance version (which was not done by the original team) a score of 22 out of 40.

The game managed to sell about 100,000 copies.
