= Jewelpet: The Glittering Magical Jewel Box =

2009 puzzle arcade game

- Developer: Sega
- Publisher: Sega
- Series: Jewelpet; Columns
- Platform: Arcade
- Release: JP: October 27, 2009
- Genre: Puzzle
- Mode: Single Player

Jewelpet: The Glittering Magical Jewel Box (ジュエルペット 〜キラキラ魔法の宝石箱〜, Juerupetto: Kirakira Mahō no Hōseki-bako) is a Puzzle game for the arcades developed and published by Sega. It's a sequel to Columns though it does not to use the Columns name. It was released on October 27, 2009. Production of the arcade machines ended in November 2011.

== Gameplay ==
The Gameplay is entirely similar to Columns using the same mechanics and rules. The only difference about the game from its other counterparts is the use of cards. The player must scan 1-3 cards into the arcade machine. Each card has a power gem with different power strengths meaning that the higher the number, the higher the power to execute a Lucky Jewel.

The game takes place inside a tall, rectangular playing area. Columns of three different symbols (such as differently-colored jewels) appear, one at a time, at the top of the well and fall to the bottom, landing either on the floor or on top of previously-fallen "Columns"

While a column is falling, the player can move it left and right, and can also cycle the positions of the symbols within it.

If, after a column has fallen, there are three or more of the same symbols connected in a straight line horizontally, vertically, or diagonally, those symbols disappear. The pile of columns then settles under gravity. If this causes three or more other symbols to become aligned, they also disappear and the pile settles again. This process repeats as many times as necessary. It is not uncommon for this to happen three or four times in a row - it often happens by accident when the well is becoming crowded. If the well fills beyond the top of the screen, the game ends.

== Updates ==
An update of the game was released on March 19, 2010, containing compatibility to newer cards.
