= Culdcept (1997 video game) =

1997 video game

- Developer: OmiyaSoft
- Publishers: OmiyaSoft (Saturn); NEC Interchannel (PS); Sega (DS); City Connection, Clear River Games (PS5, Switch, Xbox Series X/S, Windows)
- Composers: Takeshi Yanagawa; Yuzo Koshiro
- Series: Culdcept
- Platforms: Sega Saturn, PlayStation, Nintendo DS, Windows, PlayStation 5, Nintendo Switch, Xbox Series X/S
- Release: Saturn: JP: October 30, 1997; PlayStation: JP: May 1, 1999; Nintendo DS: JP: October 16, 2008; Windows: WW: July 30, 2026; PS5, Switch, Xbox Series X/S: WW: September 8, 2026
- Genres: turn-based strategy Digital collectible card game
- Modes: Single-player, multiplayer

Culdcept (Note: Japanese: カルドセプト, Hepburn: Karudoseputo) is a turn-based strategy video game developed and published by OmiyaSoft for the Sega Saturn. It is the first game in the Culdcept series. It has drawn comparisons to other modern strategy titles, and also shares features with non-video games Monopoly and Magic: The Gathering. The game was initially released only in Japan for the Sega Saturn, with an updated PlayStation release coming two years later as Culdcept Expansion. This version of the game featured additional maps and new balance tweaks and was further built upon by the following year's Culdcept Expansion Plus rerelease. A port for the Nintendo DS in 2008 was released by Sega as Culdcept DS. The game was re-released with new features under the name Culdcept The First in July 2026, the first time it was published in the West.

== Gameplay ==
In Culdcept, the player takes on the role of a "Cepter". Cepters are beings that have the ability to use magical cards to summon creatures, cast spells, and perform various other feats of wizardry. As players advance through the game, they earn additional cards that they can use to create customized "books" (decks of 50 cards) with which to better defeat their foes.

Although the game is relatively intricate, it slowly nurtures the player through basic game concepts. By acting as an arbiter and automatically enforcing the rules, game complexity is kept to manageable levels. After enough sessions, players should be able to figure out various strategies and be able to effectively practice deck optimization techniques.

=== Mechanics ===
Gameplay resembles Monopoly in that players roll a die (or two dice with certain spells) to move around on a game board. However, instead of buying the property and putting houses and hotels on it, players instead summon a creature to defend the property with cards—the Magic: The Gathering aspect of the game. If an opponent lands on a property that one owns, the opponent either pays a toll, or can choose to attack the defending creature with one of their own in order to attempt to take over the property. Unlike Monopoly, this can result in one losing a piece of land after considerable investment.

There are four property colors that represent different terrain types, e.g. green = forest. The more a player invests in the property to "level it up" (ala adding houses or a hotel in Monopoly), the more the terrain flourishes (e.g. forests become more dense with trees). This then provides additional defense to creatures of the matching color type, and exacts a higher toll on opponents landing there. And as a player collects more lands of the same color (creating "chains") the tolls, as well of the land values, increase.

Culdcept also includes item cards that can be played during battle to help attack, defend, or manipulate the battle in a number of other ways. Along with creature and item cards are spell cards that cause other various effects to creatures, territories, and Cepters.

== Release ==
Culdcept has seen a number of different releases over the years with the game initially being available exclusively for the Sega Saturn. Two years after first launching, an enhanced version of the game was released for the PlayStation dubbed Culdcept Expansion. This version of the game came with four additional maps and ten reworked cards for a more balanced experience. Just one year later, another version of the game, Culdcept Expansion Plus, was released on the PlayStation with 20 new tournament maps. Using a memory card, players were able to make saves with these new maps and load them onto the previous version of the game.

=== Culdcept DS ===
On October 16, 2008, a port for the Nintendo DS was released simply titled Culdcept DS. This port was based on the Culdcept Expansion version of the game, with the card set being rebalanced yet again, as well as the addition of brand new cards. The game also supported Nintendo Wi-Fi Connection, allowing players to battle against one another and communicate via emotes.

=== Culdcept The First ===
Culdcept The First (also called Culdcept The First Saturn Tribute) was released in 2026 for Windows via the game distribution plaform Steam, PlayStation 5, Nintendo Switch, and Xbox Series X/S. This time, new features added included the ability to rewind to previous checkpoints, quick save and quick load, optional bonus packs (increased rewards after winning a match), and the option to keep a constant eye on the hands of both oneself and one's opponent. This was also the first time the game was released in English. The game was available for download or on disc at launch, with a special edition option including special packaging, digital and CD versions of the soundtrack, and a pixel art book. The special edition of Culdcept Begins, which launched that same year, also included a copy of Culdcept The First.

== Reception ==
Culdcept was received warmly by critics and fans alike with Saturn Fan awarding the game an 8.6/10 and Sega Saturn Magazine giving it a 7.33/10. Fan rankings from these magazines gave the game a 24.17/30 and 9.4545/10 respectively, with the latter giving it the honor of ninth best Sega Saturn game of all time.

On release, Famitsu magazine scored the 1999 PS1 expansion of the game a 35 out of 40.

Culdcept The First scored a 70 on Metacritic, which assigns a normalized rating out of 100 to reviews from mainstream publications. RPGFan's Ben Love said that "experiencing the first iteration of [the] series... was a joy", however also that "it leaves a lot to be desired compared to more recent entries".
