= Chron X =

- Designers: George Moromisato, Andrea Shubert, Dan Collins, Ian Schreiber, Colin Davis, Matt Holden, Heather Wilde
- Platform: Microsoft Windows
- Release: May 28, 1997
- Genres: Online collectible card game, turn-based strategy
- Modes: Single player, multiplayer

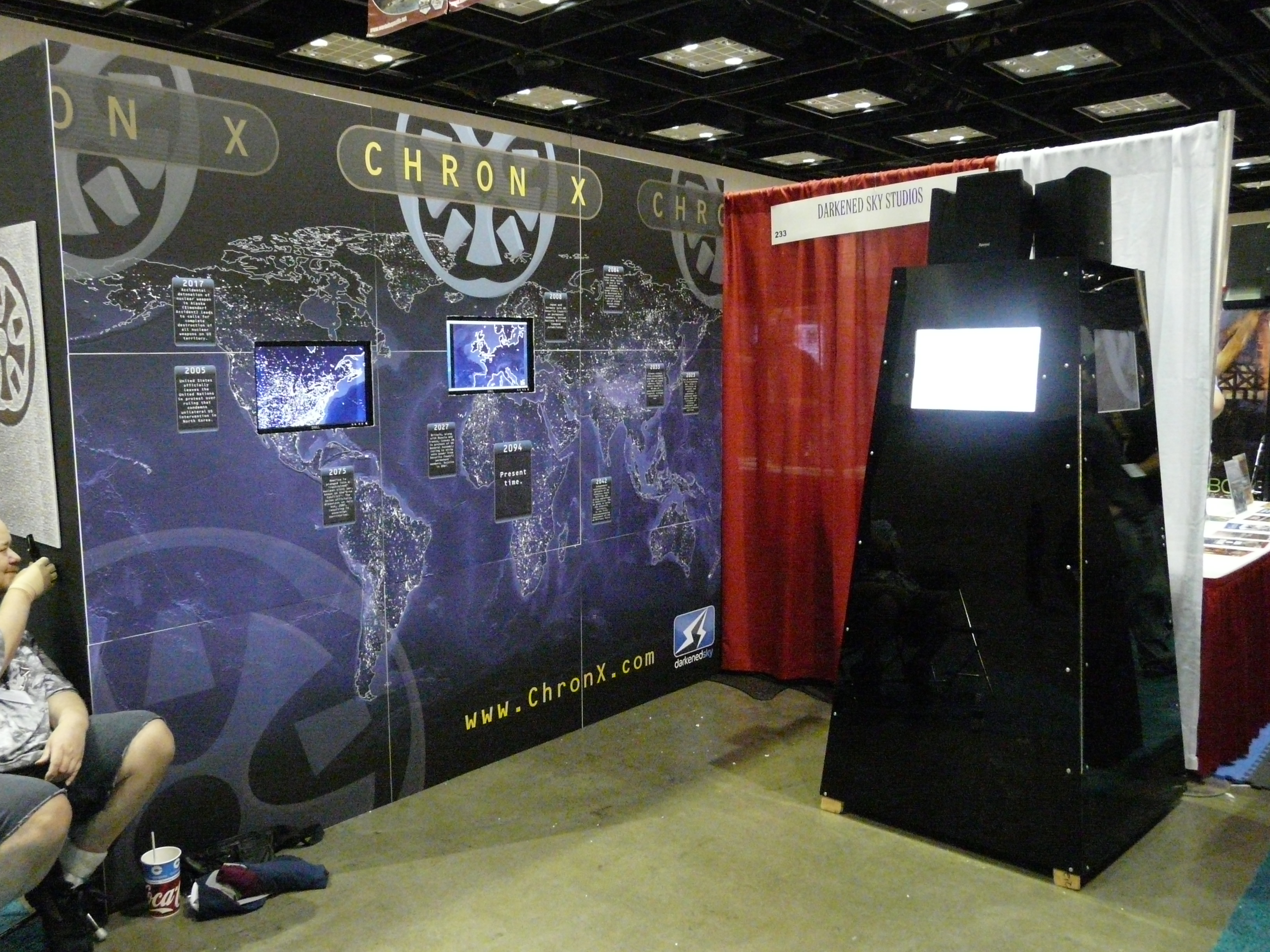
Chron X booth at Gen Con Indy 2008

Chron X is an online collectible card game and a turn-based strategy game in which an individual battles an opponent over the internet in a cyberpunk setting. Players choose between an arsenal of agents, weapons, programs, and resources chosen from your deck of virtual cards.

Chron X was the first online trading card game, first released by Genetic Anomalies in May 1997. The original game designer was George Moromisato, with later sets designed by Andrea Shubert, Dan Collins, and Ian Schreiber. Pete Bodenheimer and Slava Zatchuny also contributed to set development.

The game has had several publishers since its release: Genetic Anomalies, Sony Online Entertainment, THQ, and later Blue Sky Red Design from 2003 to 2007. On May 28, 2007, the tenth anniversary of Chron X, Darkened Sky Studios acquired Chron X for an undisclosed sum. Darkened Sky had begun work on a new, web-based client in 2008, which was never released.

On October 7, 2018, Andrea Davis announced that she had acquired Chron X from Darkened Sky. Although not ruling out the possibility of a new software release, she stated that her first priority would be a Chron X board game.

== Expansion sets ==
Expansion sets are divided into "acts", which fit into the Chron X storyline. Acts are further divided into sets. The game has had 7 expansions released to date.

Act One:

- First Edition (May 1996)
- Overture (December 1997)
- Ascension (July 1998)

Act Two:

- Defiance (February 1999)
- Whiteout (February 2000)
- Breakpoint (August 23, 2003)

Act Three:

- Reboot (March 20, 2004)
- Corruption (June 24, 2005)
- Verify (After an 18-card preview set was released by BSRD, expansion was canceled by Darkened Sky in 2007)

== Reception ==
The reviewer from the online second volume of Pyramid stated that "ChronX, the world's premiere Internet collectible card game. Here you will find that all is not as it seems. The goal is a familiar one -- "go forth and destroy thy enemy" -- however, in ChronX there is one slight problem. Before you can even think about calling an Air Cavalry strike you have to find your opponent."
