= Digital collectible card game =

Video game genre

A digital collectible card game (DCCG) or online collectible card game (OCCG) is a computer or video game that emulates collectible card games (CCG) and is typically played online or occasionally as a standalone video game. Many DCCGs are types of digital tabletop games and follow traditional card game-style rules, while some DCCGs use alternatives for cards and gameboards, such as icons, dice and avatars. Originally, DCCGs started out as replications of a CCG's physical counterpart, but many DCCGs have foregone a physical version and exclusively release as a video game, such as with Hearthstone.

== Gameplay ==
These games manage all the rules of a CCG, such as tracking the avatar's health, removing damaged creatures from the board, and shuffling decks when necessary. The games are managed on servers to maintain the player's library and any purchases of booster packs and additional cards through either in-game or real-world money. Some games, like Chaotic, Bella Sara, and MapleStory allow online players to enter a unique alpha-numeric code found on each physical card as to redeem the card in the online version or access other features. In other cases, primarily single player games based on the existing physical property have also been made, such as the Game Boy Color version of the Pokémon Trading Card Game and Magic: The Gathering – Duels of the Planeswalkers.

Most DCCGs follow rules that exist for real-world implementations of CCGs, simply played out in the virtual space. However, some games like Hearthstone have gameplay elements that would be impractical or impossible to perform in a real-world game but is easily done within the digital game. For example, Hearthstone has a "Discover" keyword that lets players temporarily obtain cards from across the entire Hearthstone library for the duration of a match, even if they do not own that card yet.

== History ==
=== 1980s–1990s: Origins ===
Prior to DCCGs, video games had used both card-based mechanics (such as Dragon Ball: Daimaō Fukkatsu in 1988) and collection-based mechanics (such as Megami Tensei (1987), Dragon Quest V (1992) and Pokémon (1996), all based on collecting monsters). The Super Famicom card-battle/role-playing game Dragon Ball Z: Super Saiya Densetsu (1992), based on the Dragon Ball Carddass series, is considered an early precursor to the DCCG, as it allowed the player to collect, buy and sell cards within the game for use in card battles.

Tabletop-based CCGs came about in 1993 with Magic: The Gathering by Wizards of the Coast which became a phenomenon that year in the traditional game market. The CCG craze grew in 1994 onward as a result. This was also approximately the same time that widespread availability of the Internet was beginning. DCCGs evolved out of the ability for CCG players to challenge each other online rather than in person, as well as to provide computerized opponents so that players could play these CCGs by themselves.

The first DCCG games eventually appeared in the late 1990s. Early examples of DCCG games include Magic: The Gathering (1997), Chron X (1997), Pokémon Trading Card Game (1998), Yu-Gi-Oh! Duel Monsters (1998), and Sanctum (1998). Magic: The Gathering and Pokémon Trading Card Game were based on their physical CCG counterparts, Yu-Gi-Oh! Duel Monsters was based on the fictional CCG from the manga Yu-Gi-Oh! (1996), and Chron X and Sanctum were original DCCG games with no physical CCG counterpart.

There have been CCGs developed solely for computer play and not based on any physical product. The first online CCGs were Sanctum and Chron X, both developed in 1997. Sanctum was taken offline in 2010, but has since returned due to fan intervention; Chron X still exists, producing new expansions over a decade later. Chron X was developed by Genetic Anomalies, Inc, which later developed other DCCG-like games based on licensed content.

=== 2000s: Growth ===
DCCG games first gained mainstream success in Japan, where online card battle games are a common genre of free-to-play browser games and mobile games. Monster-collecting Japanese RPGs such as Dragon Quest V and Pokémon, and the manga Yu-Gi-Oh, were adapted into successful physical CCG games such as Pokémon Trading Card Game and Yu-Gi-Oh! Trading Card Game, which in turn inspired a number of Japanese developers to produce digital CCG games, including adaptations such as Pokémon Trading Card Game and Yu-Gi-Oh! video games, as well as original DCCG games such as the minigame Triple Triad in Final Fantasy VIII (1999), Tetra Master (2002) which debuted as a minigame in Final Fantasy IX (2000) before becoming an online multiplayer game for the PlayOnline service, and Mega Man Battle Chip Challenge (2003). Within the United States, Wizards of the Coast had seen the success of games like Chron X and Sanctum, and initially with the help of a small development firm Leaping Lizard, built out Magic: The Gathering Online (MTGO), an online multiplayer client for Magic first released in 2002 which players could spend money and win games to build out card collections. MTGO had a number of growing pains over the years, but remains an active service that is used as one point for entry for several of the main live Magic: The Gathering tournaments.

In Japan, CCGs that are played on arcade game machines with physical card sets came into vogue in the early 2000s, which provided a boost to arcade profits and have been a mainstay in many game centers since. Arcade games of this type have been developed by companies such as Sega, Square Enix and Taito, and are most commonly of the real-time strategy or sports management genres, with some diversion into action RPGs. Players can purchase starter decks for most games separately, and after each play session, the machines will commonly dispense more cards for players to expand their decks. Examples include World Club Champion Football (2002), Mushiking: The King of Beetles (2003), Oshare Majo: Love and Berry (2004), Dinosaur King (2005), Sangokushi Taisen (2005), Dragon Quest: Monster Battle Road (2007), and Lord of Vermilion (2008).

Related, many video games have adopted CCG-type mechanics as part of a larger gameplay mechanism. In such games, the player earns cards as rewards in the game, often following similar rarity systems for distribution, and can customize some type of deck which influences other areas of the game's mechanics. Early example of this hybrid game include Phantasy Star Online Episode III: C.A.R.D. Revolution (2003), Baten Kaitos (2003), and Metal Gear Acid (2004). Kingdom Hearts: Chain of Memories (2004) was a role-playing game where the combat mechanic was based on attacks pulled from a deck of cards constructed outside of the combat rounds. Similarly, Phantom Dust (2004) was a third-person shooter, but where the player's attack and defense abilities were randomly selected from a customized "arsenal" of powers that they collected through the course of the game. Other examples of CCG-hybrid games include Forced: Showdown, Hand of Fate, and Card Hunter.

The success of Cygames' Rage of Bahamut established DCCG games as a popular genre in mobile gaming, leading to a number of DCCG games being developed for mobile devices. It was also the first DCCG game to become a major success in the Western world, becoming one of the top-grossing mobile games of 2012. DCCG games with significant populations of players include The Idolmaster Cinderella Girls, Kantai Collection and Million Arthur. In late 2012, Cinderella Girls was earning over one billion yen in revenue monthly, whilst Kantai Collection has grown to more than one million players throughout Japan.

Unofficial ways to play some digital versions of CCGs also exist, such as brand specific programs like Magic Workstation. The bulk of DCCG programs however are not specific to any brand, such as LackeyCCG and Gccg or general game simulators like Tabletop Simulator, though the legality of these systems relative to the CCG's copyright is dubious. Such systems are often used to play copyrighted games whose manufacturers are no longer publishing the game, most notably Decipher's Star Wars Customizable Card Game and Precedence’s Babylon 5 Collectible Card Game. Most of these systems do not have the CCG's ruleset programmed into the game, and instead require players to perform the necessary actions as required by the physical game's rules.

=== 2014–present: Hearthstone vs. MTG Arena ===
Blizzard Entertainment released Hearthstone in 2014. Loosely based on the World of Warcraft CCG, Hearthstone features one-on-one match between players with custom made decks, built from a player's collection of digital cards. The game was designed to eliminate reactions by the opposing player during your turn to speed up the game and allow it to be played across a variety of devices. By 2015, Hearthstone had an estimated $20 million in revenues per month, and by April 2016, had more than 50 million unique players. Hearthstone's success led to a number of similar digital-only CCGs in the following years. Wizards of the Coast announced in early 2017 that they plan to create a new studio to adapt the Magic: The Gathering game into a digital format similar to Hearthstone. Titled Magic: The Gathering Arena, it entered closed beta testing in early 2018, and over time is expected to replace MTGO as the main online game for Magic tournament play.

The digital card game market was expected to be as large as $1.4 billion in 2017, according to market analysis firm SuperData. Hearthstone encouraged the release of the digital CCGs Gwent: The Witcher Card Game and The Elder Scrolls: Legends. Shadowverse has also been compared favorably with Hearthstone.

In some cases, new elements are added to the digital CCG to improve the experience that cannot be recreated physically. The online card games Sanctum and Star Chamber include, e.g.: game boards, animations and sound effects for some of their cards. The NOKs, on the other hand, offer talking figures and action-arcade game play. In a different case, The Eye of Judgment, a CCG that has been combined with a PlayStation 3 game, bringing innovation with the CyberCode matrix technology. It allows real cards bought in stores to be scanned with the PlayStation Eye and brought into the game with 3D creatures, animations, spell animations, etc. as representations. Hearthstone uses mechanics that would be difficult or impossible to recreate in a physical setting, such as cards that allow players to draw a random card from the entire card library currently supported by the game.

Developers have also looked for other revenue models for offering digital CCGs to players. Valve's Artifact is heavily based on their multiplayer online battle arena game Dota 2, and thus features three boards (called "lanes") instead of the usual one. Instead of purchasing boosters with random cards, players purchased specific cards for Artifact from the Steam storefront, allowing the card economy to be driven by players. Gods Unchained by Immutable uses digital cards that are individually tied to blockchain elements (NFTs). While these cards cannot be updated, players can use blockchain transactions to buy, sell, and trade the cards with other players while online and enabling their use offline.

In October 2022 Marvel Snap was released. Marvel Snap is a mobile and PC-playable collectible card game that allows players to build a deck with 12 cards each representing a Marvel villain or superhero—and each with their own unique abilities—and compete against other players in short, three-minute face-offs.

== Monetization issues ==
Digital collectible card games are generally free-to-play but monetized through booster pack purchases. Booster packs have been compared to loot boxes, which are considered part of the compulsion loop of game design, and in the 2010s, been compared to gambling and have faced potential governmental actions. Physical CCG's like Magic: The Gathering had yet to see any legal actions over their booster packs, though certain packaging methods such as chase cards had been ruled illegal for sports card trading. The ESRB had originally compared loot boxes and digital booster packs to physical CCGs as to defend their practice in 2017, but later adopted new advisory labels for video games to notify consumers of the use of booster packs in games by 2020.

A 2022 report by the Norwegian Consumer Council called loot boxes (including booster packs) as "predatory" and can "foster addiction" in players. The report was backed by government consumer groups in 16 other European countries, urging regulations in upcoming European Union regulations to address the matter.

== Impact ==
With the growth of mobile gaming and streaming viewerships, digital card games are a significant part of the video game market. SuperData estimated that digital card games will bring over US$1.5 billion in 2018, with a quarter of that from Hearthstone, and the potential to grow to US$2 billion by 2020.

Forbes reported that the global Trading Card Game market size in 2022 was valued at $2.99 billion and it is expected to reach $4.2 billion by 2028.

== See also ==
- List of digital collectible card games
- List of collectible card games
