= List of Fancy Nancy episodes =

This article lists all episodes of the Disney Junior TV series Fancy Nancy. The series is based on the eponymous 2005-launched children's picture book series by Jane O'Connor; illustrated by Robin Preiss Glasser.

Disney Junior renewed the series for a second season prior to the series premiere in the United States on July 13, 2018 and in Canada the following day. Disney Junior renewed the series for a second time ahead of the second season premiere on October 4, 2019 in the United States. That began simulcast on Disney Junior in the U.S. and Canada and Disney+ around the globe on November 12, 2021. The third season would turn out to be the last/final according to series developer Krista Tucker on her LinkedIn profile, which was picked up by dedicated country-wide news outlets as a "series cancellation" and not a series finale.

== Series overview ==
Season	Segments	Episodes	Originally released	
Season	Segments	Episodes	First released	Last released
1	49	25	July 13, 2018	August 9, 2019
2	50	25	October 4, 2019	May 9, 2021
3	24	13	November 12, 2021	February 18, 2022
Shorts	—N/a	20 (shorts)	April 8, 2019	August 9, 2020

== Episodes ==
All episodes in the series were directed by Jamie Mitchell and co-directed by Mircea Kyle Mantta.

=== Season 1 (2018–19) ===
No. overall	No. in season	Title	Written by	Storyboard by	Original release date	Prod. code	U.S. viewers (millions)
1	1	"Chez Nancy" "School de Fancy"	Krista Tucker Laurie Israel	Holly Forsyth, Jill Colbert Aldina Dias, Holly Forsyth	July 13, 2018	101	0.92
Nancy tries to fancy up her newly-built playhouse after she gets upset that it is just plain and boring. JoJo and Freddy are excluded from her housewarming party, but Nancy apologizes and eventually lets them back into the playground Song: "Add a Little Fancy" Nancy and Bree start a school to teach their friends how to be fancy, but the students are unable to follow Nancy's lessons. Song: "Plain and Fancy" DVD release: Fancy Nancy: Volume 1
2	2	"Tea Party Trouble" "Bonjour Butterfly"	Krista Tucker	Eugene Salandra, Viki Anderson Eugene Salandra, John Pomeroy	July 13, 2018	102	0.82
When Nancy gets her hand stuck in a teapot, she tries to keep it a secret from her family. Nancy tries to keep a butterfly in her house as a pet. Song: "When You Can Fly Again" DVD release: Fancy Nancy: Volume 1
3	3	"Nancy's Ooh La La Spa" "Nancy Goes to Work"	Denise Downer Andy Guerdat	Chris Otsuki, Lonnie Lloyd Chris Otsuki, Hank Tucker	July 20, 2018	103	0.67
Nancy tries to give her mom a relaxing spa day, but it turns into a disaster. Song: "Ooh La La Spa" Nancy helps as her dad's assistant when he has to work from home. DVD release: Fancy Nancy: Volume 1
4	4	"Nancy Versus Dudley" "Nancy Makes Her Mark"	Andy Guerdat Matt Hoverman	Aldina Dias, Eugene Salandra, John Pomeroy Viki Anderson, Eugene Salandra	July 27, 2018	104	0.64
Nancy encourages JoJo to create an imaginary friend but regrets it soon after. Song: "J'Adore Paris" Nancy tries to make the perfect handprints in wet cement before it dries. DVD release: Fancy Nancy: Volume 1
5	5	"Nancy's Devine Sleepover" "Nancy's Sacre Bleu Fondue"	Denise Downer Matt Hoverman	Chris Otsuki, Eugene Salandra, Lonnie Lloyd Hank Tucker, Lonnie Lloyd	August 3, 2018	105	0.71
6	6	"Nancy's Dog Show Disaster" "The Case of the Disappearing Doll"	Matt Hoverman Laurie Israel	Aldina Dias, Viki Anderson Aldina Dias, Eugene Salandra	August 10, 2018	106	0.63
Nancy creates a dog show for Frenchy, but is upset that Frenchy can't do the tricks Nancy wants him to do, so she replaces him with a well-trained dog, Mrs. Devine's dog, Jewel. Nancy and Bree play detectives to find out what happened to Nancy's doll, Marabelle, only to find out she is in the washing machine. DVD release: Fancy Nancy: Volume 1
7	7	"La Danse of Friendship" "Shoe La La!"	Krista Tucker Laurie Israel	Hank Tucker, Lonnie Lloyd Eugene Salandra, Holly Forsyth	August 17, 2018	107	0.67
Nancy and Bree disagree over how they should perform their pax de deus for ballet class. Song: "Friendship Pas de Deux" Nancy tries to make money to get an expensive pair of shoes by doing good deeds.
8	8	"Camp Fancy" "Nancy's Vanity D'Art"	Andy Guerdat	Aldina Dias, Eugene Salandra Viki Anderson, Eugene Salandra	September 14, 2018	108	N/A
The Clancy family's plans for a campout in the backyard don't go as planned. It rains and there is a power outage, so Nancy decides to do the campout indoors in the living room. Song: "Pink Ploop Ting" Nancy takes interest in her grandpa's vanity and wants one herself. Song: "This Marvelous Vanity"
9	9	"Toodle-oo, Miss Moo" "Nancy Clancy, Starmaker"	Andy Guerdat Matt Hoverman	Holly Forsyth, Jill Colbert John Pomeroy, Holly Forsyth	September 21, 2018	109	N/A
10	10	"Le Café Parfait" "Mademoiselle Mom"	Laurie Israel Sarah Katin, Nakia Trower Shuman	Larry Leker, Hank Tucker Chris Otsuki, Hank Tucker	September 28, 2018	110	N/A
Nancy and Bree start their own café. Song: "Café Parfait" Nancy acts as a substitute mom when her mother gets sick and needs to rest. She takes care of JoJo while doing houseworks simultaniously, which results in the dishwasher flooding with bubbles.
11	11	"Nancy's Costume Clash" "Nancy's Ghostly Halloween"	Andy Guerdat Laurie Israel	John Pomeroy, Jill Colbert Holly Forsyth, Jill Colbert	October 5, 2018	111	0.55
Song for Nancy's Costume Clash: "An Exceptional Halloween"
12	12	"Grow Up, Jo Jo!" "Nancy's Supréme Night Out"	Matt Hoverman Andy Guerdat	Aldina Dias, Eugene Salandra Viki Anderson, Eugene Salandra	October 19, 2018	112	N/A
Nancy tries to prove that she's mature enough to join the grownups when her dad's boss comes to dinner. Song: "Grown Up Like Me" Nancy gets mad at the King's Crown Restaurant when her favorite waitress, Brigitte gives JoJo more attention than her.
13	13	"Ice Skater Extraordinaire" "Nancy L'Artiste"	Krista Tucker Andy Guerdat	Holly Forsyth, Jill Colbert John Pomeroy, Jill Colbert	November 2, 2018	113	N/A
Nancy is upset about not being good at skating the first time, but learns to practice more. Song: "Ice Skater Extraordinaire" While painting a picture of Frenchy in the house, Frenchy knocks over the paint, and Nancy blames it on JoJo because she doesn't want to be in trouble. Nancy secretly tries to give Frenchy a bath until he makes a mess everywhere.
14	14	"Vive La Révolution!" "Million Dollar Minnow"	Matt Hoverman Marisa Evans-Sanden, Krista Tucker	John Pomeroy, Holly Forsyth Jill Colbert, Holly Forsyth	November 16, 2018	114/V201	N/A
Nancy's favorite tree is declared off limits due to an accident, and her parents won't negotiate, so she and her friends go on strike. Song: "Stand Up" Nancy and Mrs. Devine overcome their fear of going underwater.
15	15	"Au Revoir, Jean-Claude" "Je Spy with My Little Eye"	Andy Guerdat Laurie Israel	John Pomeroy, Jill Colbert Holly Forsyth, Jill Colbert	November 30, 2018	115/V202	N/A
Nancy and JoJo's goldfish dies, and Nancy tries to hide it from JoJo and buy her a new goldfish at the carnival. Song: "The Blub Blub Lullaby" Nancy and JoJo overhear their parents talking and believe that they are going to give their dog, Frenchy away. Song: "No Dog Like Frenchy"
16	16	"Nancy and the Nice List"	Andy Guerdat	John Pomeroy, Eugene Salandra, Viki Anderson	December 14, 2018	116/V203	N/A
Nancy wants to be on the nice list to earn a bike, but learns the true meaning of Christmas
17	17	"What's Bugging Nancy?" "Nancy Clancy, Pet Psychic!"	Laurie Israel Matt Hoverman	Chris Otsuki, Aldina Dias Larry Leker, Hank Tucker	January 11, 2019	117/V204	0.43
Nancy and Bree's friendship is nearly ruined when Nancy discovers Bree's deepest secret, collecting bugs, which grosses her out. Song: "Best Friends, You and Me" Nancy assumes she can read the minds of pets. Song: "It's a Gift"
18	18	"Nancy, La Poéte" "Mon Amie... Grace?"	Laurie Israel Matt Hoverman	Hank Tucker, Chris Otsuki Larry Leker, Chris Otsuki	February 1, 2019	118/V205	N/A
Nancy gets writers' block while making a poem for a contest Nancy accidentally gives a Valentine to Grace. Song: for Mon Amie... Grace?: "Valentine's Day Card"
19	19	"The Amazing Adventures of Grammy and Poppy" "Un, Deux, Cha Cha Cha!"	Andy Guerdat Matt Hoverman	Holly Forsyth, Jill Colbert Chris Otsuki, Jill Colbert	February 22, 2019	119/V206	N/A
Nancy is disappointed when it appears that her grandparents aren't exciting enough. Nancy enters a dance competition with her grandpa. Song: "Stick to the Steps"
20	20	"The Imaginary Invalide" "Nancy Hops to It!"	Laurie Israel Matt Hoverman	Hank Tucker, Jill Colbert Chris Otsuki, Viki Anderson, Aldina Dias	March 8, 2019	120/V207	N/A
To avoid cleaning the garage, Nancy pretends to be sick but gets frustrated when her family has a party without her. Nancy, Rhonda and Wanda compete to be the hopscotch champ. Song: "Who Needs to Win?"
21	21	"Nancy's Friendship Faux Pas" "Nancy's Parcel Purrrsuit"	Sarah Katin, Trower Shuman	John Pomeroy, Eugene Salandra Larry Leker, Eugene Salandra	April 5, 2019	121/V208	0.38
Nancy is jealous of Bree's friend from summer camp, Megan. Nancy wants to find a lost kitten so she will be declared a hero.
22	22	"Easter Bonnet Bug-A-Boo" "The Great Easter Bunny Stakeout"	Andy Guerdat Laurie Israel	Viki Anderson, Jill Colbert Jill Colbert, Holly Forsyth	April 12, 2019	122/V209	N/A
23	23	"In the Know With Nancy" "Nancy's Parfait Pony"	Matt Hoverman Krista Tucker	Eugene Salandra, Aldina Dias John Pomeroy, Holly Forsyth	June 7, 2019	123/V210	N/A
Nancy starts a gossip column and exaggerates the facts a bit too much when she writes how Rhonda and Wanda don't get along. Nancy falls in love with Grace's pony, Pepper, but Grace won't allow her to ride it. When Pepper's fence is let loose and gallops to Nancy's house, Nancy and Bree think that Grace set Pepper free, and make a barn for Pepper to live in, which is Nancy's playhouse.
24	24	"Nancy's BFF Babysitter" "Let's Break a Deal!"	Andy Guerdat Laurie Israel	John Pomeroy, Holly Forsyth Larry Leker, Eugene Salandra	July 19, 2019	124/V211	N/A
Brigitte is babysitting Nancy and Jojo but Nancy is offended when Brigitte treats her like a child and she rebels. Nancy makes a deal to trade a piece of jewelry to JoJo, but she regrets this and tries many times to get her to give it back. Song: "Have I Got A Deal For You"
25	25	"Arts and Crafty" "Super Nancy"	Laurie Israel Matt Hoverman	Viki Anderson, Holly Forsyth Hank Tucker, Chris Otsuki, Aldina Dias	August 9, 2019	125/V212	N/A
Nancy opens her own art museum but Lionel's art for the museum isn't what Nancy had in mind. Nancy assumes the role of Dazzle Girl, a cool superhero, but needs courage to save the day and rescue JoJo. Song: "Dazzle Girl"

=== Season 2 (2019–21) ===
No. overall	No. in season	Title	Written by	Storyboard by	Original release date	Prod. code	U.S. viewers (millions)
26	1	"The Return of Dudley" "Nancy Quits the Clancy's"	Andy Guerdat Laurie Israel	John Pomeroy and Aldina Dias Eugene Salandra and Aldina Dias	October 4, 2019	203/V301	0.42
Nancy is forced to spend time with Freddy when JoJo wants to play with her imaginary friend, Dudley, instead. Wanting freedom, Nancy decides to live on her own in the playhouse but realizes living by yourself is not all it's cracked up to be. Song: "The Nancy Way"
27	2	"Nancy's Parfait Birthday!" "Nancy Finds a Rainbow"	Laurie Israel Andy Guerdat	John Pomeroy and Eugene Salandra John Pomeroy and Chris Otsuki	January 10, 2020	206	0.35
Nancy's plans for a perfect birthday party don't go as planned. She accidentally took a bath in food coloring, and it made her face green. Nancy wants to see her first rainbow.
28	3	"Paris, Adieu!" "Nancy's Fancy Heirloom"	Andy Guerdat Marisa Evans-Sanden	Jil Colbert, Chris Otsuki, and Aldina Dias Hank Tucker and Chris Otsuki	January 24, 2020	201	0.37
Nancy starts her goal to save enough money to visit Paris. Song: "My Paris" While planting a vegetable garden, Nancy and JoJo discover their mom's time capsule.
29	4	"Roses are Red, JoJo is Blue" "Love, Lionel"	Laurie Israel Matt Hoverman	Eugene Salandra and Viki Anderson Hank Tucker and Aldina Dias	February 14, 2020	V305	0.27
Song: for Love, Lionel: "I've Got Two Sides"
30	5	"Nancy and the Mermaid Ballet" "Operation: Fix Marabelle!"	Matt Hoverman Laurie Israel	Larry Leker and Holly Forsyth Holly Forsyth and Viki Anderson	February 28, 2020	202/V306	0.32
Nancy is jealous when Bree gets the lead in the mermaid ballet. Song: "We've Got Rapport" Nancy must learn to stay calm when she accidentally breaks Marabelle.
31	6	"Bon Voyage, Nancy!" "Nancy's New Friend"	Andy Guerdat Matt Hoverman	Aldina Dias and Hank Tucker Holly Forsyth and Viki Anderson	April 2, 2020	214	0.44
The Clancys encounter a series of problems and trials while on their way to Grammy and Poppy's. Song: "The Wonderful World That Awaits Me" Nancy tries to befriend Lionel's autistic cousin, Sean.
32	7	"Frenchy, Mon Amour" "Nancy's Favorite Grandpa"	Andy Guerdat	Holly Forsyth and Larry Leker Aldina Dias and John Pomeroy	April 26, 2020	212	0.49
Nancy is jealous when Frenchy appears to prefer JoJo over her. Song: "Frenchy Mon Amour" Nancy can't decide which grandfather gets her Father's Day card.
33	8	"Nancy Takes The Case" "The Dynamic Deux"	Matt Hoverman	Jill Colbert and Chris Otsuki Viki Anderson and Hank Tucker	June 7, 2020	204	0.38
Nancy and Bree try to find out who took Lionel's comic book. Dazzle Girl returns with her new super partner, Dragonfly! Song: "Dazzle Girl and Dragonfly"
34	9	"The Whisper Heard Round The World" "Nancy Braves the Storm"	Marisa Evans-Sanden Matt Hoverman	John Pomeroy and Chris Otsuki Holly Forsyth and Larry Leker	June 14, 2020	215	N/A
Nancy reveals an embarrassing secret about Lionel to all her friends and tries to apologize to him. A horrified Nancy tries to recover when a tree branch crashes through the roof of her playhouse. Song: "Stronger Than Before"
35	10	"Nancy Rocks the Boat" "Spring Dress Mess"	S : Marisa Evans-Sanden; T : Krista Tucker Laurie Israel	Kurt Dumas and Chris Otsuki Aldina Dias, Jill Colbert, and Kirk Hanson	July 5, 2020	221	0.33
Nancy goes fishing with her grandpa. Eager to get new dresses at the mall, Nancy and Bree cut corners while cleaning up their rooms. Song: "Good Enough"
36	11	"The Astonishing Jonathan" "Nancy Starts A Business"	Matt Hoverman Andy Guerdat	Holly Forsyth and Larry Leker Viki Anderson and Holly Forsyth	August 16, 2020	205	N/A
Jonathan, Nancy's cousin, stars in her magic show. Nancy tries to sell ice cream to get more money for her trip to Paris. Song: "Ice Cream Smile"
37	12	"Trois Cheers for Mrs. Devine" "Escar-No!"	Laurie Israel Marisa Evans-Sanden	Larry Leker, Chris Otsuki, and John Pomeroy John Pomeroy and Holly Forsyth	September 6, 2020	208	0.24
Nancy becomes worried when Mrs. Devine is depressed. Song: "The Love You Left Behind" Nancy is shocked when she discovers real French food for the first time.
38	13	"Tea for Three" "Nancy and Bree Take a Vacation"	Matt Hoverman	Holly Forsyth and Jill Colbert Aldina Dias and Chris Otsuki	September 20, 2020	210	0.33
Nancy hosts a tea party to get ballroom dance rivals Grandpa Frank and Mrs. Devine to become friends. Song: "A Cup of Tea" Nancy's ideas for a break aren't what Bree had in mind.
39	14	"Bree's House Rules" "A Thousand Times Non!"	Laurie Israel	Larry Leker and Chris Otsuki Eugene Salandra and Jill Colbert	October 4, 2020	TBA	N/A
While having a sleepover at Bree's house, Nancy encourages Bree to bring food into her room, which is against the rules. Nancy discovers that the house rules at Bree's are different than that at Nancy's house. Nancy tries to convince her parents to let her get pierced ears. Song: "Fancier"
40	15	"Le Boy Next Door" "Nancy's Looth Tooth"	Andy Guerdat	Chris Otsuki and Jill Colbert Viki Anderson and Eugene Salandra	November 8, 2020	TBA	N/A
Nancy is jealous of Roberto, a boy who recently moved from Paris, Texas. Nancy is embarrassed when she loses a tooth, at the same time she gets her picture taken at dance class. Song: "A Girl With the Hole In Her Smile"
41	16	"Attention, S'il Vous Plaît!" "Copy Cat JoJo"	S : Laurie Israel; T : Matt Hoverman Marisa Evans-Sanden	Kurt Dumas, Aldina Dias, and Chris Otsuki John Pomeroy, Larry Leker, and Jill Colbert	November 15, 2020	TBA	0.31
Nancy thinks her parents give JoJo more attention. Nancy is irritated when JoJo keeps repeating what she says, and says something hurtful to JoJo which makes her cry.
42	17	"Who's the Boss" "Little Miss Lettuce"	Laurie Israel Andy Guerdat	Kirk Hanson and Eugene Salandra Viki Anderson, Aldina Dias, and Larry Leker	November 22, 2020	TBA	N/A
During a scavenger hunt, JoJo and Freddy are tired of being bossed around by Nancy and Bree and give them a taste of their own medicine. Nancy and her friends start a parade. Song: "Let Us Be Proud"
43	18	"Battle for the Cul-de-Sac" "Sally Merry Clancy"	Laurie Israel Krista Tucker and Jamie Mitchell	Jill Colbert, Aldina Dias, and John Pomeroy Viki Anderson, Larry Leker, and Angelina Ricardo	December 6, 2020	TBA	0.39
Dazzle Girl and Dragonfly fight a team of new villains. Song: "Won't Stop Until We Win" Nancy questions if her own doll, Marabelle, is rael after JoJo gets a new talking doll named Sally Merry.
44	19	"New Year's Nancy" "Nancy's Gift to Grandpa""	Krista Tucker Andy Guerdat	Jill Colbert, Larry Leker, and Chris Otsuki Eugene Salandra and Jill Colbert	December 27, 2020	207	0.40
Nancy is determined to stay up light to watch the ball drop on New Year's Eve, but she sleeps through it. Nancy makes a gift for Grandpa: a chalk drawing of a beach after Grandpa's planned beach trip gets cancelled. Song: for New Year's Nancy: "The Fanciest Midnight"
45	20	"Goodbye, Dolly!" "Nancy's Soccer Encore"	Laurie Israel	Viki Anderson and Jill Colbert Eugene Salandra and Hank Tucker	January 3, 2021	TBA	0.37
After their dolls disagree on what to do, Nancy and Bree decide to end their friendship. Song: "If I Were My Doll" Nancy must get over an embarrassing soccer moment when she plays in a tournament.
46	21	"Leaders of Le Pack" "JoJo and the Unicorn"	Andy Guerdat Matt Hoverman	Chris Otsuki and Holly Forsyth Hank Tucker, Kurt Dumas, and Larry Leker	January 17, 2021	TBA	0.31
Nancy and Bree start a dog-walking business, but find out walking dogs is tough. When JoJo gets sick in bed, Nancy tells her the story about Eunice the Magic Unicorn. The next day, an all-recovered JoJo tries looking for a unicorn that doesn't exist. Nancy and Bree try a cardboard unicorn costume, and then Grace's pony pepper to show JoJo that Eunice is real. Song: "Eunice the Magic Unicorn"
47	22	"Pajama Drama" "Chirp Trouble"	Matt Hoverman Marisa Evans-Sanden	Jill Colbert and Holly Forsyth John Pomeroy and Hank Tucker	February 14, 2021	TBA	N/A
Nancy and Bree have a falling out when Grace joins their sleepover, Nancy and Bree say the truth about their friendship. While returning Bree's pendant, curiosity gets the better of Nancy when she discovers a fancy box in which she opens and releases a cricket in Bree's room, making Bree mad and kicking her out of her house.
48	23	"Classical Nancy" "Nancy's Twin Advice"	Andy Guerdat Matt Hoverman	Holly Forsyth and Eugene Salandra Viki Anderson, Scotland Barnes, and Kris Wimberly	March 14, 2021	TBA	N/A
Nancy is given a CD of classical music and wants to get Roberto to appreciate it. Nancy gives advice to Wanda, who wants to learn to play the violin, but does not want to disappoint her sister, Rhonda, who wants her to join an upcoming soccer game. Song: "Follow Your Dream"
49	24	"Nancy Runs Her Own Race" "JoJo Does the Dirty Work"	S : Laurie Israel; T : Andy Guerdat Andy Guerdat	Jill Colbert, John Pomeroy, and Hank Tucker Julius Aguimatang, Holly Forsyth, and James Little	March 28, 2021	TBA	N/A
Nancy is afraid of coming in last in an upcoming race. Rhonda, Bree and Lionel all want to be Nancy's partner in an upcoming dance and Nancy must give each of them the news of who will be her partner, so she asks JoJo to give them the bad news, but inadvertently hurts their feelings. Song: "Play It Square"
50	25	"The Momover" "Nancy's To-Do List"	Marja Adriance and Valerie Breiman David Chambers and Julie Chambers	Viki Anderson, Aldina Dias, and Angelina "Spikie" Ricardo Holly Forsyth, Larry Leker, and Chris Otsuki	May 9, 2021	TBA	N/A
Nancy makes her mom fancy like Grace's mom but realizes that the old mom is better. Song: "Now You're Fancy" Nancy has to do a list of chores, but she does not want to do them and tricks JoJo into believing she has to do them.

=== Season 3 (2021–22) ===
No. overall	No. in season	Title	Written by	Storyboard by	Original release date	Disney+ release date	Prod. code	U.S. viewers (millions)
51	1	"Nancy the Auteur"	S : Matt Hoverman; S/T : Andy Guerdat	Aldina Dias, Chris Otsuki, John Pomeroy, and Hank Tucker	November 12, 2021	November 12, 2021	304	N/A
Nancy and her friends try to make a movie, but they discover all the difficulties with production. When Nancy gets discouraged with all the hardships, her friends encourage her to keep trying and they manage to finish the movie. Song: "If You Have A Dream"
52	2	"Frenchy Takes the Stand" "Tears of a Superhero"	Matt Hoverman Andy Guerdat	Larry Leker, Chris Otsuki, Eugene Salandra, Scotland Barnes Holly Forsyth, John Pomeroy, Hank Tucker	November 19, 2021	November 12, 2021	TBA	N/A
Nancy and her friends play "Judge and Jury" to find out whether Nancy's dog, Frenchy stole Lionel's pie. While playing superheroes, Nancy teaches Roberto that it is okay to cry after he hurts his shin but must learn a lesson of her own when she tries to get her other friends to cry. Song: "Power of A Tear"
53	3	"Crochet it Isn't So!" "Nancy Plays House"	Matt Hoverman S : Krista Tucker; T : David Chambers and Julie Chambers	Jil Colbert, Angelina "Spikie" Ricardo, Eugene Salandra Aldina Dias, Kurt Dumas, Larry Leker	November 26, 2021	November 12, 2021	TBA	N/A
Nancy is frustrated with crocheting a difficult pattern for Mrs. Devine, so she takes inspiration from Lionel's cousin, Sean, who is determined to run through a sprinkler despite his sensitivity due to his autism. Song: "Sean Tries" Nancy and Bree disapprove of JoJo and Freddy's unusual ideas of how to play "House" and try to teach them the "right" way to play.
54	4	"Nancy's Fancy Library!" "Smitten by a Kitten"	S : Jess Pineda; T : Andy Guerdat Julie Chambers and David Chambers	Viki Anderson, John Pomeroy, Eugene Salandra, Scotland Barnes Aldina Dias, Jil Colbert, Hank Tucker, Kurt Dumas	December 3, 2021	November 12, 2021	TBA	N/A
Nancy starts her own library in her playhouse but gives away a lot more than she expected. Song: "Giving" Nancy gets a new adorable kitten but is forced to give it away when it turns out that JoJo is allergic to cats. Bree later adopts the kitten, named "Chausettes."
55	5	"The Best Baby Sitter Du Monde!" "Big Top Nancy"	Matt Hoverman	Holly Forsyth, Larry Leker, Chris Otsuki Viki Anderson, Eugene Salandra	December 10, 2021	November 12, 2021	TBA	N/A
Nancy's favorite babysitter, Brigitte, is leaving Plainfield to go to college in Chicago and Nancy tries to keep her from going. Nancy produces a circus show for JoJo on her birthday. Song: "Circus Time"
56	6	"Nancy's Sweet Dreams!" "Joie De Jonathan"	S : Krista Tucker; T : David Chambers and Julie Chambers Matt Hoverman	Holly Forsyth, Chris Otsuki, Eugene Salandra Jil Colbert, Chris Otsuki, Angelina "Spikie" Ricardo	December 17, 2021	November 12, 2021	TBA	N/A
Nancy is frightened by a horrible dream she had, and is now afraid of everything bunnies. Jonathan tries to fit in with the other boys after he is scheduled to be in Nancy's fashion show. Song: "Joie De Vivre"
57	7	"Vegetables for Paris" "Nancy's Mermaid Tale"	Andy Guerdat S : Jamie Mitchell; S/T : Matt Hoverman	Holly Forsyth, Eugene Salandra, Hank Tucker Viki Anderson, John Pomeroy, Angelina "Spikie" Ricardo	January 7, 2022	November 12, 2021	TBA	N/A
The Clancys sell vegetables to get more money for their trip to Paris. When Nancy and JoJo can't swim in the local pool, Nancy helps JoJo pass the time by telling her a mermaid tale. Song: "I Own The Sea"
58	8	"Dazzle Girl's Double" "Dancy Nancy"	Matt Hoverman Krista Tucker	Aldina Dias, Angelina "Spikie" Ricardo, Hank Tucker Jil Colbert, Larry Leker, Eugene Salandra	January 14, 2022	November 12, 2021	TBA	N/A
Nancy encourages Grace to join her and Bree's superhero team, but Dazzle Girl gets threatened by the new superhero, Sparkle Gal, who is a copy of her. Song: "There's No Wrong" Nancy is excited to reach Level 1 of ballet class but is frustrated that she has to learn only the basics of ballet first.
59	9	"The Price of Being Nice" "Nancy's Good Old New Times"	Andy Guerdat	Aldina Dias, Holly Forsyth, Hank Tucker Jil Colbert, Holly Forsyth, Larry Leker	January 21, 2022	November 12, 2021	TBA	N/A
Daisy, Nancy's old friend, wishes to join the soccer team but can't afford it, so Nancy must choose whether to give her latest Paris trip savings to Daisy, or keep it. Nancy and JoJo's plans for an evening to watch "Nannette the Nice Witch" are complicated when they are being babysat by Grammy and Poppy, and the television doesn't even work at all. Song: "The New Old Way"
60	10	"Lionel Speaks Up" "What's Bree's Story?"	Andy Guerdat Matt Hoverman	Viki Anderson, Larry Leker, Angelina "Spikie" Ricardo, Hank Tucker Jil Colbert, Holly Forsyth, Eugene Salandra	January 28, 2022	November 12, 2021	TBA	N/A
Nancy hosts a fromage party, but Lionel had plans to read his comic books and must learn to speak up for what he wants. Song: " Everybody Does But Me" Bree wants to join Nancy's fruit-themed party but struggles to keep up with all the activities her parents have scheduled for her.
61	11	"The Buzz on Oak Street" "Grace Gets Real"	S : Jamie Mitchell; S/T : Krista Tucker Matt Hoverman	Viki Anderson, Chris Otsuki, John Pomeroy Jil Colbert, Holly Forsyth, Eugene Salandra	February 4, 2022	November 12, 2021	TBA	N/A
Nancy, Bree and JoJo try to convince Grandpa Frank to let a beehive be in the Clancys' yard, even though Nancy got stung by a bee. Song: "Buzz Buzz Buzz" Nancy tries to teach Grace how to be nicer to others and not brag.
62	12	"Nancy's Dream Comes True" "Nancy's Flight to Paris"	Andy Guerdat Krista Tucker	Viki Anderson, Chris Otsuki, Angelina "Spikie" Ricardo, Eugene Salandra Jil Colbert, Holly Forsyth, Hank Tucker	February 11, 2022	November 12, 2021	TBA	N/A
Nancy is delighted to find out that her family can finally afford to fly to Paris, but her friends don't seem excited for her, only to find out they hid a surprise party. Song: "Because You Had A Dream" Nancy has to be patient when her flight to Paris is delayed due to bad weather, and she can't sleep on the 8-hour flight.
63	13	"Paris At Last!"	Andy Guerdat and Matt Hoverman	Viki Anderson, Aldina Dias, Larry Leker, John Pomeroy, Angelina "Spikie" Ricardo, and Hank Tucker	February 18, 2022	November 12, 2021	TBA	N/A
In the series finale, Nancy is excited to find that Bree was able to join her family when they visit Paris. During the tour of Paris, however, the Clancy family gets separated. When they finally make it to the Eiffel Tower, it is closed due to a commercial being filmed there. Nancy sings a song about how her family worked to afford visiting Paris and they end up starring in the commercial and see Paris at the top of the Eiffel Tower. Songs: "Regardez Paris" and "Paris Open Your Doors"

== Shorts ==
=== Fancy It Yourself ===
==== Season 1 ====
No.	Title	Original release date
1	"How to Have a Fancy Tea Party"	April 8, 2019
Nancy teaches viewers how to have a fancy tea party
2	"How to Make Your Dog Fancy"	April 9, 2019
Nancy and JoJo teaches viewers how to make their dog fancy
3	"How to Wear a Boa"	April 10, 2019
Nancy teaches viewers the correct way to wear a boa
5	"How to Make a Flower You Eat"	April 12, 2019
Nancy teaches viewers how to make a flower made from vegetables.
6	"How to Make Your Hair Fancy"	April 15, 2019
Nancy teaches viewers how to make their hair fancy by styling it.
7	"How to Make a Plain Outfit Fancy"	April 16, 2019
Nancy teaches viewers how to make a plain outfit fancy.
8	"How to Make a Fancy Tiara"	April 17, 2019
Nancy teaches viewers how to make a fancy tiara.
9	"How to Speak Francais"	April 18, 2019
Nancy and JoJo teaches viewers how to speak French.
10	"How to Make a Fancy Signature"	April 19, 2019
Nancy and her friends teaches viewers how to write their own fancy signatures.

==== Season 2 ====
No.	Title	Original release date
1	"Nancy's Butterfly Pavilion"	July 19, 2020
2	"Nancy's Dance Party"	July 19, 2020
3	"Nancy Plays Dress Up"	July 26, 2020
4	"Frenchy's Spa Day"	July 26, 2020
5	"Nancy Plays Beauty Salon"	August 9, 2020
6	"Nancy Decorates With Dad"	August 9, 2020
7	"Nancy's Pique-Nique"	August 9, 2020
8	"Nancy's Dinner Party"	August 9, 2020
9	"Nancy Arranges Flowers"	August 9, 2020
10	"Nancy's Slumber Party"	August 9, 2020
