= Chaotic: Shadow Warriors =

- Developer: Fun Labs
- Publisher: Activision
- Platforms: Xbox 360, PlayStation 3, Wii, Nintendo DS
- Release: November 10, 2009

Chaotic: Shadow Warriors is a 2009 video game developed by Fun Labs and published by Activision. It is based on the Chaotic trading card game and inspired by the animated television series of the same name.

== Gameplay ==
Chaotic: Shadow Warriors takes place on the world of Perim, where various factions battle for dominance, and the player engages in strategic, turn‑based combat that follows the rules of the Chaotic Trading Card Game. Players choose from 40 playable characters and assemble tactical combinations of mugic spells and battlegear, then compete in eight different arenas where creatures act out each attack and counterattack through 3D animations. Progress in the single‑player Story mode unlocks additional cards that expand available abilities and equipment, while Versus mode allows two players to compete directly using their customized card‑based strategies.

== Development ==
Chaotic: Shadow Warriors was announced in February 2009. It was released on November 10, 2009 for Xbox 360, PlayStation 3, Wii, and Nintendo DS.

== Reception ==
Reception

Aggregate score
Aggregator	Score
Metacritic	60/100 (Note: Based on 4 reviews)

Review scores
Publication	Score
GameVortex	68%
IGN	5.5/10
Official Xbox Magazine	5/10
Strana Igr	6/10

=== Critical response ===
Official Xbox Magazine called the combat in Chaotic: Shadow Warriors "boring". IGN recommended it "only for the hardcore fan(s) of the cartoon".

=== Sales ===
Over a million copies of Chaotic: Shadow Warriors were sold, generating $32 million in sales.
