= Chaotic (TV series) =

Animated science fantasy television series

- Genre: Adventure; Science fantasy; Action
- Created by: Merlin P. Mann; Martin Rauff
- Developed by: Norman J. Grossfeld; Michael Haigney
- Written by: Michael Haigney; John Touhey; Jake Black; Mark Lickona; Alan Kingsberg
- Voices of: Jason Griffith; Darren Dunstan; Gary Mack; Rebecca Soler; Marc Thompson; Meredith Zeitlin
- Theme music composer: Matt McGuire; John Siegler; Ralph Schuckett; John Angier
- Composers: Matt McGuire; Julian Harris; John Angier; Paul Rucker; Wayne Sharpe; Elik Alvarez; Ralph Schuckett; Freddy Sheinfeld; Louis Cortelezzi; Joel Douek; John Siegler
- Country of origin: United States
- Original language: English
- No. of series: 3
- No. of episodes: 79 (list of episodes)

Production
- Executive producers: Norman J. Grossfeld; Alfred R. Kahn; Bryan C. Gannon; John T. Milito
- Producer: Michael Haigney
- Animators: Stone Perales (art director); Jason Narvaez (art director)
- Running time: 20–23 minutes
- Production companies: Chaotic USA Entertainment Group; 4Kids Entertainment

Original release
- Network: Fox/4Kids TV (episodes 1–53); The CW/CW4Kids (episodes 54–79); Teletoon
- Release: October 7, 2006 – March 13, 2010

Chaotic is an American animated science fantasy television series produced by 4Kids Entertainment and Chaotic USA Entertainment Group, with animation provided by Bardel Entertainment for season 1 and South Korean studio Dong Woo Animation for seasons 2 and 3. It is based on the Danish trading card game of the same name, with most of the plot based on the game's original storyline.

== Premise ==
Tom and his friend Kaz are teenagers who both play the trading and online card game Chaotic. Kaz always tries to tell Tom about a secret code to play for real which Tom refuses to believe. While playing online, Tom receives the special password. When he enters the password into his game scanner, he is transported to a place called Chaotic that is able to take him to another world where the characters, locations and items in the card game came to life.

There are two parts to the Chaotic world: Chaotic and Perim. In Chaotic, players play an advanced version of the card/online game where they transform into the game's creatures. In Perim, the creatures, locations, and items from the game are real. Players from the Chaotic game can teleport into Perim and scan locations, creatures, and items with their scanners, gaining the ability to use them in their games. There are four tribes in Perim. Two tribes, the Overworlders and the Underworlders, have been at war over a great power called the Cothica. Both have different interpretations of how the war began, with each tribe seeing the other as being evil and the ones who started the conflict. The insect-like Danians and reptile-like Mipedians later joined the war, turning it into a four-way conflict over the Cothica.

When the players are in Chaotic/Perim, they exist simultaneously on Earth so their daily lives can continue without drawing concern or attention from others. When a Chaotic player leaves Chaotic they become one person again and the Earth version of the player gains the memories of anything they experienced in the Chaotic/Perim world.

== Episodes ==
Season	Title	Episodes	Originally released	
Season	Title	Episodes	First released	Last released
1	N/A	40	October 7, 2006	March 22, 2008
2	M'arrillian Invasion	27	September 13, 2008	October 3, 2009
3	Secrets of the Lost City	12	October 31, 2009	March 13, 2010

== Characters ==
- Tom Majors (voiced by Jason Griffith) – Mainly an OverWorld player, Tom Majors is the main protagonist of the series. He is subsequently shocked and overwhelmed by his first transportation to Chaotic, transforming into the Card Game Creatures and experiencing the battle "for real." However, Tom eventually overcomes his fear and is presented as a bold risk taker and thrill seeker, meeting the Creatures and exploring the locations in the dimensional world of Perim. His name is a reference to Major Tom, the fictional astronaut from the song "Space Oddity".
- Kazdan "Kaz" Kalinkas (voiced by Darren Dunstan) – Mainly an UnderWorld player, Kaz focuses on the game, becoming a better player and improving his battle skills and his collection. He tends to be more cautious and less adventurous; preferring to calculate the odds before taking a risk, unless rare Creatures, BattleGear, or Mugics are at stake. Kaz's favorite and trademark card is Chaor, the leader of the Underworld.
- Peyton (voiced by Marc Thompson) – Peyton is a charismatic and eccentric Chaotic player who uses a lot of slang and has an encyclopedic knowledge of the game. He often tests unusual theories and strategies in battle, which unexpectedly lead to victory more often than not. Though he loves to win—especially with his Mipedian Creatures—Peyton will also battle using some of Perim's freakiest creatures just to have the experience of transforming into them.
- Sarah (voiced by Rebecca Soler) – Sarah is a Danian player and is smart and feisty, often speaking her mind. She tends to get into fights with the boys or the other Players.
- Krystella and Klay (voiced by Meredith Zeitlin and Gary Mack respectively) – Krystella and Klay are a pair of pranksters who function as the main antagonists of the series. The duo's favorite activity, besides battling in Chaotic, is sabotaging the lead characters.

== Cast ==
=== Principal voice actors ===
- Darren Dunstan – Kaz Kalinkas, Wamma, Ghatup
- Jason Griffith – Tom Majors, Frafdo, Zhade
- Gary Mack – Klay, Iparu
- Rebecca Soler – Sarah
- Marc Thompson – Peyton, Chaor, Najarin, H'earring
- Meredith Zeitlin – Krystella

==== Other voice actors ====
- Mike Pollock – Tianne, Heptadd
- Dan Green – Codemaster Imthor, Tangath Toborn, Tartarek
- Marc Diraison – Codemaster Crellan
- Sean Schemmel – Maxxor, Ulmar, Blazier, Marquis Darini
- David Brimmer – Vidav
- David Zen Mansley – Lord Van Bloot, Rhaden
- Kevin Kolack – Khybon, additional voices
- Eva Christensen – Takinom
- Christopher C. Adams
- Maddie Blaustein
- Joshua Briggs
- Greg Abbey – Sobtjek
- Shawn Curran
- Wayne Grayson
- Britton Herring
- Rebecca Honig
- Jesse Hooker
- Matt Hoverman
- Allyson Johnson
- David Lapkin
- Rachael Lillis – Intress, Deehna
- Corey Manuel
- Cassandra Lee Morris
- Suzy Myers
- Lisa Ortiz
- Ted Lewis
- Andrew Rannells
- Tony Salerno
- Michael Sinterniklaas
- Eric Stuart
- McNeil Taylor
- Veronica Taylor – Quadore, Ajara, Skithia
- Tom Wayland
- David Wills – Raznus
- Brian Wilson
- Max Wortendyke
- Stuart Zagnit
- Oliver Wyman – Agitos, Odu-Bathax, Tartawrecker

The voice director for the series was Darren Dunstan.

== Broadcast ==
A short preview was shown on 4Kids TV on September 30, 2006, at 10:30 a.m. ET. The show officially premiered on October 7 of that same year. 4Kids Entertainment plans to "roll out the storyline over seven years", implying there were seven seasons planned for the television series. A second season, called Chaotic: M'arrillian Invasion, began airing in September 2008 on 4Kids TV. While season 1 used Flash animation, seasons two and three were animated in traditional animation. Jetix (U.S.) bought the cable rights to the show and began airing it daily at 7:00 a.m. on October 1, 2007.

Digital cable providers, such as Comcast, Cox Communications, and Bresnan Communications, began to air four new episodes in February 2008 on 4KidsTV's Video on Demand service.

Teletoon and The CW4Kids aired most of the premiere episodes for their respective countries. The CW4Kids premiere episodes began airing in February 2009 with M'arillian Invasion episode 14, while Teletoon began airing the second season in January 2009. Cartoon Network took over premieres for the final seven M'arrillian Invasion episodes in the U.S. in August 2009, but The CW4Kids regained the premieres when the third series, entitled Secrets of the Lost City, started on October 31, 2009, where the rest of the series would then have its premieres simultaneously on both Cartoon Network and The CW4Kids. Toon Disney aired the show on Jetix. On February 13, 2009, Jetix, along with Toon Disney, merged into a new network called Disney XD. The Jetix brand no longer exists in the United States, but the first season of Chaotic continued to air on the network. Cartoon Network acquired the rights for the second and third seasons and began airing them and Yu-Gi-Oh! 5D's in June 2009. By airing the second season straight through, The CW was able to premiere episodes before The CW4Kids. The series finale aired on March 13, 2010, but the show continued to air on Cartoon Network and Disney XD until 2011. On July 7, 2025, the series aired on Primo TV.

The series is currently available on Tubi, Amazon Prime and Peacock.

== See also ==
- Chaotic Trading Card Game
- Chaotic: Shadow Warriors
