= Fancy Nancy the Musical =

Musical

Fancy Nancy The Musical
- Music: Danny Abosch
- Lyrics: Susan DiLallo and Danny Abosch
- Book: Susan DiLallo
- Basis: Based on the Fancy Nancy books by Jane O'Connor and Robin Preiss Glasser
- Productions: 2012 Off-Broadway

Fancy Nancy The Musical is an American musical with book and lyrics by Susan DiLallo, and music and lyrics by Danny Abosch. It is based on Fancy Nancy and the Mermaid Ballet, part of the popular Fancy Nancy book series by Jane O'Connor, illustrated by Robin Preiss Glasser.

== Productions ==
The original Off-Broadway production, commissioned and produced by Vital Theatre Company, Inc, opened on September 29, 2012 at the McGinn/Cazale Theater. The production featured Aly Bloom as Nancy and Darilyn Castillo as Bree, and was directed by Sam Viverito. The production was reviewed by The New York Times and other sources. The musical closed Off-Broadway in 2015 and has since been produced by various theatres throughout the country with licensing through the Susan Gurman Agency.

== Plot synopsis ==
Fancy Nancy is so excited to audition for the school play. But her fancy world crumbles when she learns she's not cast as a mermaid but she'll be playing a tree! With the help of her friends Nancy rallies and the play is a huge success, with the best tree dance ever.

== Original Cast ==
- Nancy - Aly Bloom
- Bree - Darilyn Castillo
- Wanda - Jes Dugger
- Lionel - Kyle Motsinger
- Mom - Amanda Savan
- Rhonda - Tricia Giordano

== Song list ==
- Overture
- Anyone Can Be Fancy
- What I'll Be
- I'm A Tree
- You'll Always Feel Much Better After Tea
- On My Team
- Something Terrible
- You'll Always Be My Star
- The Deep Sea Dances Ballet
- A Fancier Place

== Recording ==
The Original Off-Broadway Cast Recording was released on Ghostlight Records.

== Awards and nominations ==
- 2013 “CD Of The Year Award” from Creative Child Magazine's 2013 Creative Child Awards Program
- “Gold Award” from Family Review Center
- “Seal of Approval” from Family Review Center
- “Editor's Choice” from Family Review Center
- 2013 “Silver Winner” from National Parenting Publications Awards (NAPPA)
