= Chaotic =

Danish trading card game

- Original work: Trading card game
- Owner: Chaotic Entertainment

Print publications
- Book(s): The M'arrillian Chronicles: The Khilaian Sphere by Aaron S. Rosenberg

Films and television
- Animated series: Chaotic (2006–2010)

Games
- Traditional: Chaotic Trading Card Game (2006)
- Video game(s): Chaotic Online (2007); Chaotic: Shadow Warriors (2009)

Chaotic is an American media franchise consisting of a trading card game, animated series, a video game, book series and toy line. It originated as a card game in Denmark, which was redesigned and relaunched in North America in October 2007 by 4Kids Entertainment. The animated series of the same name proceeded the card game by about eight months and aired on 4Kids TV, Jetix, The CW4Kids, Cartoon Network and Disney XD.

A major selling point of the Chaotic TCG was that each card featured a unique patented 12 digit alphanumeric code that enabled the owner to upload their collection to the Chaotic website and play against others online. The target market for the franchise was boys ages 9 to 14, who were too old for the Pokemon TCG but too young for Magic: The Gathering.

In 2008, the Chaotic TCG was the best selling trading card game in Canada, and the third best selling in the United States. In 2009, the game's website had 1.25 million registered players, compared to 150,000 for Magic: The Gathering. But due to declining sales amid the Great Recession, the game ceased in October 2010. Years later, in May 2026, Chaotic Entertainment announced it had partnered with Panini America to relaunch the game.

== History ==
=== Origins ===
In 1997, Dracco Company Ltd. was founded in Denmark by twin brothers Jacob and Henrik Andersen. In 1999, they released Dracco Heads, a series of small plastic figures similar to Gogo's Crazy Bones. It was followed in 2000 by another set called Dracco Heads 2, which was spun off into a trading card game called "Grolls & Gorks," which in 2001 relaunched as "Chaotic: Now Or Never!" Chaotic soon caught the attention of Bryan C. Gannon, an executive at Upper Deck Company. After failing to convince Upper Deck to buy the rights, Gannon acquired the rights himself through his own company, Apex Marketing, and then sought a partner to bring the game to North America.

=== Pre-launch (2005-2007) ===
In May 2005, 4Kids Entertainment,Inc. announced it had acquired the worldwide licensing rights to the Chaotic TCG from Apex Marketing and Dracco Company Ltd. The company announced plans to work with Apex to release a Chaotic television series on 4Kids TV expected to debut in Fall 2006. At that time Chaotic had sold $53 million in cards in Denmark. Under the agreement, "Chaotic: Now Or Never!" was rebranded as Chaotic and the property was reworked to make it more appealing to North American audiences. The cards were redesigned by Sam Murakami, who previously worked to localize the Yu-Gi-Oh! TCG in the U.S., and Martin Rauff, the designer of the original game from Denmark. The new card art was created by artists including Khary Randolph. On October 7, 2006, the Chaotic tv series premiered on 4Kids TV, a weekly Saturday morning block on the Fox network. The storyline was key to boosting interesting in the upcoming card game, with it planned to roll out over the next seven years. The card game was set to launch at hobby shops in January.

On December 11, 2006, 4Kids announced it had secured several patents and used them in the creation of two new stand-alone ventures, a trading card company called TC Digital Games LLC, and an online multi-platform gaming company called TC Websites LLC. Both would focus on the Chaotic brand. In an interview, 4Kids CEO Alfred R. Kahn clarified the new ventures were co-owned by 4Kids and Chaotic USA Entertainment, which was owned by Bryan Gannon and John Milito. Chaotic USA owned the Chaotic brand and 4kids acquired the rights through it. Gannon was made CEO of TC Digital, and the joint venture was 53% owned by 4Kids, and 47% owned by Chaotic USA.

4Kids moved the card game launch back to Spring, which would be followed by toys and other merchandise, possibly even a "Wi-Fi enabled scanner" to capture card images. At that time, fan interest in Yu-Gi-Oh! and Teenage Mutant Ninja Turtles wanned, and 4Kids hoped for Chaotic to be a hit and make up for loss revenue. However, Jefferies and Company analyst Robert Routh said "The odds are against them. Very few properties like Chaotic take off. Even Yu-Gi-Oh!, which did incredibly well, died out pretty fast. And this is no Pokémon."

On May 16, 2007, 4Kids planned for the UnderWorld and OverWorld themed starter decks to became available for purchase at comic and hobby stores nationwide. The game's website, where players could upload cards and play matches, would launch on the same day. Both launch dates got purchased back to June 27, 2007, with the cards release at specialty retail or mass channels to come 90 days later. This release window would be shortened to 60 days for following sets. The release date was moved for a third time, to the Summer to allow for more time to fix the website.

=== Launch (2007) ===
On October 24, 2007, the Chaotic TCG officially became available for sale at comic and hobby shops after numerous delays due problems with the website. Products included two starter decks and the Dawn of Perim: Secrets booster packs. That same day, the public beta version of the game's website also officially launched. In five weeks of beta testing, over 600,000 online cards had been registered and over 110,000 matches played. Merchandise licensees deals were soon reached with Giant Merchandising for t-shirts, sweatshirts, track jackets, BioWorld for head gear, Prima Games for strategy guides, and American Greetings for greeting cards and sundries. On December 15, 2007, the TCG released at 750 FYE and Suncoast Video locations, which had in-store signage and displays. On December 18, 2007, 4Kids purchased an additional 2% stake in TC Digital from Chaotic USA, making it officially a subsidiary.

=== Growth (2008) ===
On January 8, 2008, Toys "R" Us began stocking Chaotic cards at 500 locations, making it the first mass market chain to sell the game. A Chaotic TCG boutique was set up at the flagship store in Times Square through March where kids could learn and play the game. Distribution soon expanded to Target Stores, Walmart and Kmart. A multi-million dollar TV ad campaign was launched along with an organized play program at hobby stores. By February 2008, the card game was sold in 10,000 stores across North America. On April 9, 2007, the second booster set, Zenith of the Hive, was released. Retailers that had previously underordered the launch set increased their orders in anticipation of growing demand. The "Passport to Perim Demo Days," a series of sponsored organized play and demo events held at 50 comic and hobby stores, was organized to promote the new expansion, and help establish organized play in retail stores.

By May 2008, 4Kids had invested $3.6 million on the Chaotic TCG and its website, while selling $2.4 million worth of cards. According to the company, Chaotic was the second best selling card game in Canada. More than 15 million cards had been registered online which had over a million unique visitors. 4Kids CEO Alfred R. Kahn expressed optimism about the franchise's future. On July 4, 2008, Best Buy began stocking the game. Around that time Ultra Pro agreed to produce branded trading card accessories.

By November 2008, $14.7 million worth of cards had been sold that year, and 4Kids was on track to reach $20 million for the year. At that time, 4Kids claimed Chaotic was number three in the marketplace after the Pokemon TCG and Yu Gi Oh!, with the Naruto TCG close behind. Still, 4Kids was loosing money due to declining revenue from licensing deals from Yu-Gi-Oh!, the Teenage Mutant Ninja Turtles, and the Cabbage Patch Kids. At that time the M’arrillian Invasion starter decks and the Rise of the Oligarch booster packs were announced along with the Chaotic Collectible Tin and Scanner Deck.

=== Decline (2009) ===
During the first half of 2009, Chaotic had rolled out in the United Kingdom, France and Germany. In February 2009, Spin Master obtained the exclusive toy licensee for Chaotic and the rights to market and distribute Chaotic toys, excluding plushies. In March 2009, Chaotic became available at 1,000 7-Eleven locations. Also in March, Kahn said Chaotic card sales had declined due to retailers and distributors reducing, canceling or returning orders amid the Great Recession, causing 4Kids to take a $3 million write-down on its trading card inventory. In Q1, 4Kids reported card sales at $437,000, down from $2.4 million for that same period a year ago.

The Turn of the Tide booster set released in April, followed by the Forged Unity set in July. On September 9, 2009, the Secrets of the Lost City starter decks were released alongside the Alliances Unraveled booster packs. The next set, Fire and Stone, was to come out before the end of the year. Also in September 2009, Penguin Books agreed to publish several Chaotic novels, graphic novels and a sticker book. On November 10, 2009, the Chaotic: Shadow Warriors video game was released. Soon after, the Chaotic TV show was cancelled and the Fire & Stone was indefinitely delayed.

=== Hiatus (2010) ===
In May 2010, 4Kids reported “substantially no revenue” from the Chaotic TCG in Q1, and acknowledged a “over-all lack of demand for the Chaotic property." On October 1, 2010, 4Kids shutter TC Digital Games and TC Websites, thus ending support for the Chaotic TCG and its website. The change would save the company an estimated $1 million per quarter. 4Kids continued to own the rights to the Chaotic brand as they filed for Chapter 11 Bankruptcy in 2011 and reorganized as 4Licensing Corporation.

=== Revival (2026) ===
In May 2026, Chaotic Entertainment, run by Gannon, announced it had partnered with Panini America to relaunch the Chaotic TCG and an "online experience" supported by AWS Games. New cards would be manufactured and sold at hobby stores starting in October 2026, followed by major retailers in January 2027. In addition, all 79 Chaotic animated episodes will be published online and upscaled to High-definition video.

== See also ==
- Chaotic Trading Card Game
- Chaotic: Shadow Warriors
- Chaotic (TV series)
