= List of Chaotic episodes =

The following is a list of episodes and seasons of the animated television series Chaotic.

== Series overview ==
Season	Title	Episodes	Originally released	
Season	Title	Episodes	First released	Last released
1	N/A	40	October 7, 2006	March 22, 2008
2	M'arrillian Invasion	27	September 13, 2008	October 3, 2009
3	Secrets of the Lost City	12	October 31, 2009	March 13, 2010

== Episodes ==
=== Season 1 (2006–08) ===
No. overall	No. in season	Title	Original release date
1	1	"Welcome to Chaotic"	October 7, 2006
2	2	"Welcome to Chaotic"	October 21, 2006
When Tom receives a password from his Chaotic Code Scanner, he is transported to the world of Chaotic. He fights in his first Chaotic match against Sam Murakami. After a shaky first battle in the Chaotic BattleDromes, Tom gets tricked by Klay to teleport to Perim. Back on Earth, Kaz tries to help him recover his lost Scanner in the junkyard. Tom meets Sarah in Perim.
3	3	"Unexpected"	January 20, 2007
In Chaotic Tom meets Peyton, a strange player who is also his next opponent in the BattleDromes. Tom is thrown off and angered by Peyton's odd behavior, like him choosing his deck with his eyes closed. Meanwhile Kaz meets H'earring in Underworld City and goes on a ScanQuest after he sees Chaor's new VileDriver. Peyton takes the upper hand in his battle with Tom when he uses his creature's ability to turn invisible. Tom's own strategy backfires when he takes the battle to "Cyrstal Cave" which causes all of their attacks to reflect back and hit both of them.
4	4	"Over Under Rent Asunder"	January 27, 2007
Kaz does battle with an undefeated Chaotic player while Sarah and Peyton tell Tom of the history of Perim and the war for the Cothica.
5	5	"Crash Course"	February 3, 2007
Kaz fights Klay in the dromes, where it revealed both players have the new BattleGear the Viledriver. Meanwhile Tom heads to Perim to scan the prankster Overworlder Yokkis.
6	6	"The Thing About Bodal"	February 17, 2007
After being saved by him in Kiru City, Tom agrees to use the very weak Bodal in his next match in exchange for a new Battlegear. This end putting him in serious jeopardy when his opponent uses the mighty Tangath Toborn. In doing so, Tom learns that brains can beat brawns too.
7	7	"Buggin' Out"	February 24, 2007
After Sarah is captured by the Danians, Tom, Kaz, and Peyton embark on a rescue mission to save her only to be captured themselves.
8	8	"Everything is in Flux"	March 10, 2007
Tom and Kaz free Xerv, an Overworlder who was captured by the deceptive Krystella, who planned to sell him out to the Underworld for scans. In retaliation, Krystella spies on Tom and Kaz strategizing for an upcoming match against Klay. Now knowing of Tom's strategy, Klay arms himself with Magmon, a lava golem like Underworlder and a Flux Bobble, which would take them to the Lava Pond, where Magmon reigns supreme.
9	9	"Castle Bodhran or Bust"	March 24, 2007
10	10	"Castle Bodhran or Bust"	March 31, 2007
While Tom, Kaz, Peyton, and Sarah try to get some of Dractyl's scales to pay H'earring, they discover another player's Scanner. Messaging the owner, it revealed to belong to a boy named Reggie, who's Chaotic self hasn't returned. Knowing he was heading to Castle Bodhran, Tom and Kaz try to find a scan. The only Chaotic Player willing, wants Tom's prized card Maxxor in a Challenge Match. However, they still get the Castle Bodhran scan, but Tom and Kaz are captured by Maxxor in their search for Reggie. This forces Tom and Maxxor to overcome their distrust for each other for their own survival against the Mipedians over a map that could lead them to The Cothica.
11	11	"Lord of Treachery"	April 7, 2007
Kaz is summoned to a secret meeting by Chaor, lord of the Underworld, for help dealing with Lord Van Bloot, an Underworld Muge who serves as Chaor's second-in-command. Van Bloot apparently wants to talk diplomatically with Chaor at Gothos Tower, Van Bloot's homebase that gives him invisibility. Now Kaz has to find a player with both scans to help Chaor with the inevitable confrontation with Van Bloot using the Chaotic game.
12	12	"BattleDrome of the Sexes"	April 14, 2007
Peyton and Krystella clash in battle while Sarah tells Tom of the Overworld heroine Intress.
13	13	"Battle Lessons"	April 21, 2007
Feeling down from losing his Maxxor scan, Tom learns about the CodeMasters, the seven best players in Chaotic who will challenge players if they win 7 matches in their respective dromes. While trying to get some new scans, Tom rescues a player in the wilds of Perim and battles him to gain some tips, finding the player is actually CodeMaster Crellen.
14	14	"The Birth of Borth-Majar"	April 28, 2007
Kaz gains a new scan that is actually two creatures in one - Borth-Majar, the duo of the brainy pint-sized Borth, and the dimwitted golem Majar. Soon after, Kaz finds himself using Borth-Majar in a match and must master controlling two creatures at once.
15	15	"Shifting Sands"	September 8, 2007
Peyton wants to trade Mipedian creatures for Tom's scan but Tom declines as he distrusts them after what happened with Reggie and Mudeenu. He says Overworlders are better so Peyton takes him to the Mipedian desert. Tom's opinion changes when he and Peyton are attacked by an evil scorpioid Overworlder named Slruhk. Slurhk traps them in a crack in the desert floor where a noble Midpedian named Tianne saves them. Hearing what Tom says about the Mipedians, Tianne tells Tom to scan him and use him in his next Chaotic match. After he does they are attacked again by Slurhk, and Tianne saves them again by sacrificing himself. Tom's newfound respect is put to the test when he confronts a fierce opponent in the BattleDrome.
16	16	"Fallen Hero"	September 15, 2007
Tom refuses to return to Chaotic, being he no longer has his account's Maxxor scan. So Kaz aggrees to help find the Overworld leader. However much to their surprise, Maxxor and Intress have gone missing forcing the duo to go across Perim and Chaotic to find out why.
17	17	"Scavenger Scan"	September 22, 2007
When Kaz and Peyton's 'friendly' squabble spins out of control, Tom decides the only solution is a 'Scavenger Scan' match. Kaz and Peyton have one hour to scrape up all the scans they need for a match. The clock is ticking as the desperate duo speed through Perim, scavenging scans and dodging danger – then it's off to the BattleDrome for the most chaotic Chaotic battles ever.
18	18	"Allmageddon"	September 29, 2007
A player known as Drew has been on a massive winning streak using the owl Overworlder Hoton, winning every match he's challenged to. The gang discovers that Hoton has learned an incredibly powerful attack called Allmageddon. Now with Peyton being his next opponent, he's got to come up with a plan to outdo the unbeatable player.
19	19	"A Fearsome Fate"	October 6, 2007
Tom finally has a new scan of Maxxor, but when he transforms into the awesome OverWorld leader during a Drome match, he makes a startling discovery – the once-brave warrior is now a quivering coward. Seeking to unravel the mystery of Maxxor's illness, Tom accesses the new scan's memories. In doing so, Tom discovers that in his latest bid to oust Chaor as leader of the Underworld, Lord Van Bloot has used the Decomposition Mugic to transfer Maxxor's skills to himself. Now Tom must 'port to Lake Ken-i-po to consult with Najarin – if he can survive the Mugic trap inside the old wizard's castle.
20	20	"Maze of Menace"	October 13, 2007
With info from Najarin, Tom searches for the mystical Callstone that may reverse Lord Von Bloot's Decomposition Mugic on Maxxor. Can he find the stone, evade Lord Von Bloot, and get to Maxxor before Chaor destroys him?
21	21	"Out in the Cold"	October 20, 2007
Kaz's ScanQuest in the Crystal Range goes south when Pyrithion traps Blugon in an energy field before heading up the mountain to attack Raimusa. With Blugon unable to deliver to his friend the Battlegear and Mugic he needs to beat Pyrithion, Kaz must brave a treacherous shortcut to get the delivery to the summit in time. Tom battles in the Drome with a kid who has scans of the shortcut to guide Kaz.
22	22	"ChaotiKings"	October 27, 2007
A hot-shot group of Chaotic players, dubbing themselves the ChaotiKings, offer Kaz a chance to join their prestigious clique. Torn between friendship and popularity, Kaz sets out to become the ChaotiKings' newest member – if he can survive the initiation.
23	23	"Stelgar Strikes"	November 3, 2007
When Tom, Peyton, and Kaz sneak into Castle Mommark to scan some of the geneticist's latest experiments, Peyton accidentally releases the cute little starfish like creature Stelgar into the wilds of Perim. Out in the sunlight, Stelgar turns into a giant, rampaging monster.
24	24	"The CodeMaster Chronicles"	November 10, 2007
25	25	"The CodeMaster Chronicles"	November 17, 2007
After seven victories in the Crellan Drome, Tom is challenged to another match by CodeMaster Crellan. In preparation, when he scans Mugic he is tricked by Klay and Krystella into believing it will double his power, but it really switches their stats. Now not only does Tom have to deal with this set back, but he must also deal with Crellan's true ace creature: Crommax, Maxxor's caveman-like distant relative.
26	26	"The Ultimate Scan"	November 24, 2007
Peyton leads the others to a hidden location on a map he received that will lead him to a creature called Iparu, a creature nobody is certain exists. However, Rothar has secretly followed them, and Kaz has started acting oddly.
27	27	"An Easy Win"	December 1, 2007
Peyton begins a losing streak upon needing one more win to challenge Imthor. Desperate, he challenges "Lulu the Loser," a nervous and inexperienced player on a losing streak worse than his own. The only problem is Peyton starts feeling bad for her and decides to let her win a round, or two.
28	28	"A Flux Too Far"	February 9, 2008
Tom and Sarah square off in Battledrome Hortekk while Peyton and Kaz attempt to obtain a scan of the Flux Bauble.
29	29	"Chaotic Crisis"	February 16, 2008
Ulmar has created a machine that will port the UnderWorlders to Chaotic. However, his machine causes wormholes to appear through Perim. The UnderWorlders, OverWorlders, Mipedians, and Danians all appear in Chaotic. Kaz is forced to choose sides as he learns that the creatures of Perim are planning an invasion of Earth.
30	30	"The Curse of Kor-bek"	February 16, 2008
Tom and his friends go on an adventure in an underwater sub with Antideon to face Nauthilax.
31	31	"Fire Fighters"	February 23, 2008
Kaz faces HotShot, a battler who specializes in fire attacks, known for his hatred of Underworld Players.
32	32	"Chasm Quest"	February 23, 2008
Tom finally ports to Prexxor Chasm, the Location scan he won after defeating Codemaster Crellan, having practiced in the Betadrome for so long. Upon arriving, Tom meets Smildon who inexplicably wants to leave, frightened of something. Upon using a new scan of Prexxor Chasm, Tom discovers what it is, a green goo like anomaly called The Blight, one that appears in the Location Scan.
33	33	"Train Wreck"	March 1, 2008
When Kaz winds up on a losing streak, Peyton enlists a coach to help his friend out. The thing is, the coach is the Underworld prison guard Grook, and what Peyton didn't tell Kaz was the agreement to take over a shift guarding the prisons.
34	34	"Trading Cards"	March 1, 2008
Sarah needs a Song of Mandibloor, and has Tom, Kaz, and Peyton Trading and trekking in both the real world and Chaotic to get her the cards she needed for a long trade sequence to get the mugic.
35	35	"Dual, Duel"	March 8, 2008
36	36	"Dual, Duel"	March 8, 2008
Tom and Kaz try to get Khybon's newest battlegear, the Phobia Mask. Unfortunantly for the duo, Krystella and Klay destroy it after securing it for themselves. Tom and Kaz face Klay and Krystella in a four-way match after trying to scan the Phobia Mask. After Tom and Kaz defeat Klay and Krystella, the two back out of the deal. Unfortunately for the duo, Tom and Kaz have to come to their rescue when the hypnotizing Underworlder Opto uses them for labor in the Mugic Mines and almost cause a cave-in.
37	37	"Going Under"	March 15, 2008
Tom finds himself losing to an increased number of UnderWorld deck players so he decides to use an UnderWorld deck of his own. Kaz is thrilled and decides to help him until his friend ends up on a hot winning streak without his help. Thinking his friend will end up as a better UnderWorld player, Kaz tries to convince Tom to turn back to his Overworlders.
38	38	"Big Time"	March 15, 2008
During a fight, Kaz discovers his opponent has a creature he has never faced before: a flying Danian named Vollash. Sarah vows to get a scan of him and her search leads to a fateful showdown between a Mipedian spy and the Danian Queen.
39	39	"Eye of the Maelstrom"	March 22, 2008
Tom camps out at Lake Ken-I-Po to obtain a scan of Najarin and decides to track the creature, leading him to a pack of UnderWorld raiders.
40	40	"Fighting Friendly"	March 22, 2008
Both Tom and Kaz have six wins in the Imthor Drome so Tom surprises Kaz with a Drome challenge with the winner going on to face CodeMaster Imthor. However, when Kaz accuses Tom of cheating and Tom admits to it, CodeMaster Imthor bans Tom from Chaotic Battles while it is investigated. Not wanting to be around when the CodeMasters are done with their meeting, he goes to Kiru City in Perim. Before he leaves, he vows to Sarah and Peyton that he and Kaz are enemies.: This is the last episode to use Flash Style Animation before switching to Standard Animation for the next season.

=== Season 2: M'arrillian Invasion (2008–09) ===
No. overall	No. in season	Title	Original release date
41	1	"A Rare Hazard"	September 13, 2008
Tom flees to Perim after Kaz accuses him of cheating. His exile takes a treacherous turn when Tom runs into a gang of rogue Chaotic Players who are destroying rare Locations in the OverWorld. Tom is pressured into joining their scheme and soon has nowhere left to run. After thwarting their plan, it was revealed Tom never cheated, it was all a plan he and Kaz made to stop the rogue players.
42	2	"Dangers of Diplomacy"	September 20, 2008
When Tom and Kaz aid an OverWorld diplomat named Raznus who was returning from peace negotiations with the Danians, they earn Maxxor's thanks. All seems well until Tom makes a disturbing discovery back in Chaotic, Raznus has been infected with a Danian Parasite, turning the Overworlder into a Danian.
43	3	"The Floundering Father"	September 27, 2008
There's a new kid in Chaotic! Buzz Jr. is a talented Danian Player. Unfortunately, the boy's demanding dad is taking the sting out of his game. It's up to Kaz to show the blustering Buzz Sr. that Drome battling is tougher than he thinks.
44	4	"Colosseum Showdown"	October 4, 2008
During a scan quest, Peyton and Sarah encounter the biggest fighter they've ever seen, one seemingly immune to being scanned. Kaz, Tom, Sarah and Peyton decide to track down the giant. But trouble comes for Kaz when he bumps into a creature called Hammerdoom Chantcaller who challenges him to the coliseum. He has to battle or be banished from the Underworld.
45	5	"Rockwave and Roll"	October 11, 2008
Peyton is shocked to learn he is battling the lead singer of his favorite band, and is offered free tickets to the next concert if he can win.
46	6	"Chaor's Commandos"	October 18, 2008
47	7	"Chaor's Commandos"	October 25, 2008
The Overworld is a buzz when rumors of a new Battlegear is hidden in the Overworld Armory. While exploring Fear Valley, Kaz runs into Chaor training four UnderWorlders consisting of Ultadur, Dindyon, Narfall, and Swassa in an attempt to get said Battlegear. Now Kaz has to pick a side, help Chaor, or help his friends.
48	8	"Mega Match"	November 1, 2008
Peyton is beaten by Kaz and wishes to make the ultimate Drome match, but Sarah drags Kaz to Mount Pillar instead to locate a Danian BattleGear called the Mandiblor Crown (which she threw down a garbage chute after being found out by the guards) as a way to repay her for obtaining a scan of Geltod. Meanwhile, Peyton and Tom face off in a match with 105 creatures on each side, but end up falling asleep from too many battles.
49	9	"Time's Up"	November 8, 2008
Tom and Kaz go on a topsy-turvy adventure when they look for Sarah and Peyton in Kirvak Mound (a series of caverns within Skeleton Springs). They soon discover that the effects of Kirvak Mound has de-aged Sarah to a little girl and aged Peyton to an old man. They now have to evade prehistoric creatures to find their way back. When they look for Sarah, they find other portals leading to various points in history. It is later revealed the portals in Kirvak Mound also show possible futures of Perim, including one where it is totally submerged.
50	10	"Gigantemtopolis"	November 15, 2008
Tom and company explore a giant temple for treasures to scan and discover much more than they bargained for. When one of the defense mechanisms mesmerizes Tom into a deadly trap, the rest of the gang (along with Larina) try to save him and Blazier.
51	11	"War Beasts"	November 22, 2008
A player named Connor, with help from Klay and Krystella, tricks Peyton into trading 20 of his cards for a scan of the Mipedian Warbeast Blazvatan. But after Connor, feeling bad, gives him a bit of advice, Peyton searches for the one type of creature that can tame the WarBeasts: Conjurers. Peyton and Klay battle: Warbeast VS. Warbeast.
52	12	"From the Deep"	November 29, 2008
53	13	"From the Deep"	December 6, 2008
An unusual UnderWorld Creature named Phelphor is found frozen inside Ice Pillar by UnderWorlders. Sarah and Kaz scan him. With him being taken to Chaor's castle, Peyton and Kaz head there while Sarah tries Phelphor in the Drome. During the match, Tom nearly codes Sarah, until she discovers Phelphor has an aquatic form and abilities that hypnotize Tom and cause him to code himself. In his castle, Chaor, Agitos, and Takinom are amazed by Phelphor's tale of a lost tribe called M'arrillians (which are all aquatic creatures) and their discovery of the Cothica, Perim's greatest treasure, which they hold behind the Doors of the Deep Mines. Chaor states they will discuss opening the Doors to retrieve the Cothica and dismisses Phelphor. Kaz and Peyton must port out before they can scan to evade Spyder. Phelphor uses his mind control to have Khybon contact Lord Van Bloot so he can unlock the Doors. He also tries to control Chaor, but it fails, though he controls Chaor's guards, which forces him to flee. Chaor recovers and learns Lord Van Bloot is leading his army to the Doors. Chaor and Lord Van Bloot's armies fight, with Chaor going after Phelphor. Phelphor mind controls the guards into opening the Doors of the Deep Mines first, letting out a flood of murky brown water that washes away everything in its path. Tom, Kaz, Peyton and Sarah scan the door as it opens but are forced to port to keep from being washed away. Thus the lost tribe and Perim's forgotten enemies, the M'arrillians, are freed.
54	14	"Tale of Two Toms"	February 28, 2009
During a high-risk scan quest, Tom Majors meets another Player named Tom and is dismayed to discover his namesake is taller, faster, and cooler. When CoolTom starts stealing his friends, he gets jealous and challenges him to a Chaotic match. When he finds himself down to just Maxxor against six creatures Tom is further angered by his opponents obnoxiousness and defeats him by wagering Maxxor and his friends to fight with anger. After being scolded by his friends and apologizing, Tom's friends reconcile with him.
55	15	"Blight Fight"	March 7, 2009
Tom promises to save the creatures of Prexxor Chasm from The Blight ravaging them. Tom, Kaz, Peyton, and Sarah stop by Lake Morn to see its caretaker Garv, who may be able to help if he gets a sample of the disease. Tom manages to do so with Smildon's help and Garv creates a serum he places in a crystal-encased spearhead. Tom plans to attract the disease while Smildon kills it with the spear, but Smildon is ambushed by a creature infected by the disease and loses the spear.
56	16	"Newbie"	March 14, 2009
When Kaz and Peyton are at the Lava Pond to obtain a scan of Zapetur, they are attacked by the M'arrillian Milla'iin, who is doing mysterious work with a hypnotized Khybon. Tom, Kaz and Peyton battle for the attention of a beautiful newbie named Shinwan who exhibits her skill in the Battledome by defeating Klay in her first ever drome match. They accompany her to the Lava Pond to try to scan Milla'iin, as no one has gotten a scan of a M'arrillian yet.
57	17	"Putting the Muge in Mugic"	March 21, 2009
Tom, Kaz, and Peyton reach Broken Edge (the border between the OverWorlders and the Mipedians) in hopes to find new Mugic and BattleGear for Tom's Drome Match. They evade a Mipedian patrol but are captured by Overworlders. Luckily, Najarin prevents them from being harmed. Tangath Toborn returns and reveals Prince Mudeenu is plotting to take Broken Edge. Hune Marquard creates an enhancement mugic without any downsides, which even Najarin hasn't created. Tangath has the mugic used on the Overworld soldiers when the Mipedians attack. The mugic works and Najarin leaves. In his Drome match Tom uses his scan of Hune Marquard's mugic to enhance him, but its power runs out against his opponent's final creature, leaving Tom's creatures helplessly exhausted. Tom forfeits the match and heads to Najarin for help as the Overworlds are now too exhausted to fight and are losing. Luckily, Tom tricks one of the Mipedians into casting Najarin's new mugic and saves Tangath's forces, forcing the Mipedians to retreat.
58	18	"Mister E"	March 28, 2009
H'earring leads Kaz to where Milla'iin was last sighted but ends up taken over by his mind control. Meanwhile, Tom is constantly bugged by Evan (codenamed Mister E) to battle Tom's Maxxor. Tom is informed by Sarah and Peyton he is an UnderWorld Player and Tom finds Milla'iin on his team. Kaz stalks H'earring, seeing Milla'iin is using local creatures to dam a river to flood the Underworld. Kaz learns Tom is losing his match and that the monsters on Mister E's team are the same group of Underworlders working for Milla'iin in Perim. Milla'iin spots Kaz and sicks the Underworlders on him, forcing him to abandon H'earring. In the match, it comes down to Maxxor against Milla'iin, which Maxxor loses. Afterwards, Mister E tells Tom he made a deal with the real Milla'iin to record how Maxxor fights, which Tom knows the M'arrillians will use to fight Maxxor.
59	19	"When a CodeMaster Calls"	April 4, 2009
Sarah and Kaz head to Ulmar's lab to get a scan for the Reality Field Generator. Peyton gets a call from CodeMaster Hotekk who would like Peyton to become his apprentice if he can prove himself worthy getting scans from Psikoom City (a M'arrillian city behind the Doors to the Deep Mines). Tom finds the deal suspicious and discovers Klay was trying to scam Peyton out of his scans and stops him. In the end, Peyton thanks not Tom, but Klay as He rubs in his face that his scheme Lead to Peyton getting 4 Rare scans.
60	20	"Earth to Kaz"	April 11, 2009
After writing a school essay about how Chaotic is a real place, Kaz is sent to a psychologist by his worried mother. If Kaz can't prove he's telling the truth about Chaotic, his mother will take his scanner away.
61	21	"Raznus Returns"	April 11, 2009
Raznus, having been assimilated into the Danian Tribe, returns to Kiru City with Danian warriors. They are accidentally discovered underneath Bodal's arsenal and capture Tom, Bodal, and Olkiex. Odu-Bathax decides to raid Kiru City so Kaz runs off to get Maxxor, only for Intress to tell Kaz Maxxor is in the Riverlands (which the M'arrillians had polluted). Maxxor is attacked by a squad of M'arrillians so Intress takes OverWorld warriors to free Tom, Bodal, and Olkiex. Raznus tries to reason with Intress, but they end up fighting each other. Maxxor manages to evade his M'arrillian pursuers and use the Song of Translocation to get to where Intress is, defeating the Danians. Raznus tells Maxxor the M'arrillians have polluted the Danians' water supply. They came here to establish a new Hive. Maxxor lets the Danians go to deliver a message to Queen Illexia - a truce to defeat the M'arrillians.
62	22	"Warriors of Eternity"	September 12, 2009
Sarah is kidnapped by a ghostly Mipedian creature when she and Peyton are on a scan quest. Sobtjek and the other Mipedians learn the M'arrillians have flooded Ropa'Sahhk Desert where the Conjurers live from one of them, Scara. Scara advises they need to join forces with the Warriors of Owayki and Sobtjek takes a squad there. Meanwhile, Peyton, Tom, and Kaz are looking for Sarah when they run into Sobtjek's men. Upon learning what happened to Sarah, Sobtjek decides to bring them along in the direction where the Mipedian ghost went. The next morning, the group encounters the Mipedian ghost, who Sobtjek identifies as Owayki. The spirit of Owayki then attacks the approaching Ihun'kalin (the M'arrillian responsible for flooding Ropa'Sahhk). When Ihun'kalin is unable to control Owayki, he ends up controlling some of the Mipedian soldiers. Sobtjek uses the Melody of Mirage to fool the brainwashed Mipedians and flee to a mist-covered area. Sarah and the petrified Warriors of Owayki are there. When the brainwashed Mipedians close in, Peyton has Sobtjek place a mugic within one of the petrified warriors, which brings him them to life, evening the odds.
63	23	"UnderWorld Overthrown"	September 19, 2009
During Kaz's second attempt to rescue H'earring, Chaor and the UnderWorlders plan to ambush the M'arrillians in a fiery trap involving Ulmar's Annihilizer near the oil-filled Marsh of Murk. Kaz ends up mind-controlled and Tom tries to rescue him while Sarah and Peyton look for a new battlegear called a Mindbander that can negate the hypnosis. Though both Tom and Chaor succeed, Milla'iin and the others took shelter in the oil field and thus survived. Aa'une speaks through a hypnotized Rarran and tells Chaor that while he was busy here, Lord Van Bloot (who Phelphor still controls) and his army took control of Underworld City.
64	24	"Triple Threat"	September 26, 2009
Tangath Toborn must form an army from the Overworlders, Danians, and Mipedians, but they spend most of their time infighting. Meanwhile, Tom, Sarah, and Kaz fight Peyton in a training drome match, who is using his M'arrillian Erak'tabb.
65	25	"Last Stand"	October 3, 2009
66	26	"Last Stand"	October 10, 2009
The CodeMasters initiate an emergency order to recall all Chaotic Players and shut down the Transport Systems as Perim is too dangerous with the M'arrillians about to conquer it. While Tangath Toborn leads a group to Glacier Plains to attack the M'arrillian base there trying to melt the glacier and flood the Overworld, Phelphor's army surrounds Kiru City. Maxxor plans to go to the M'arrillian city of M'arr to capture Aa'une and bring him to Lake Blakeer (a location that disrupts mind control abilities) to stop this. While rescuing Peyton, Tom, Sarah, and Peyton are trapped in Perim when the transport system shuts down. The three go to Kiru City, where Najarin tells them he suspects Tartarek is a traitor to the alliance. Kaz, still in Chaotic, battles Tartawrecker to try to find proof. In M'arr, Chaor rescues Maxxor, they set aside their differences to capture Aa'une and succeed in taking him to Lake Blakeer. The heat cannon on Glacier Plains fires but Tangath Toborn manages to use the Symphony of Stasis to freeze the floor, though it takes effect after he is engulfed in water. Kaz finds evidence Tartarek has been taken over by the M'arrillians and Tartarek confirms it, but states Aa'une, unlike other M'arrilians, gets stronger at Lake Blakeer. At the lake, Aa'une morphs into a more powerful form to fight Chaor and Maxxor.
67	27	"Legions of Aa'une"	October 17, 2009
With his powers enhanced from Lake Blakeer, Aa'une unleashes a devastating mindwave that races across the Overworld and reaches Kiru City, where the Tribal Allies watch in horror. Kaz fails to contact Tom and Codemaster Crellan allows Kaz to use the transport system to go to Perim to find them. Takinom appears at Kiru City, leading an army from all the surviving creatures not under mind control to fight Phelphor's army. Aa'une knocks Maxxor into Lake Blakeer but it turns out that Maxxor was really Iparu posing as him so Maxxor could find Xerium Armor, which he appears wearing. Kaz arrives in Kiru City as Takinom's army fights Phelphor's. Kaz uses a Psych-Sphere from Ulmar's lab to free Tom, Peyton, and Sarah from the mind control. Tom and the others head to the Kiru City Library to recover their scanners only to be attacked by a brainwashed Intress. At Lake Blakeer, Aa'une turns into a massive sea creature but Iparu becomes a clone of him to fight. Maxxor and Chaor discover Lake Blakeer is negatively charged and upon finding which one is Iparu, knock Aa'une into the lake with a positively charged attack. With Aa'une's death, the mind control on the creatures is broken and the M'arrillians retreat.

=== Season 3: Secrets of the Lost City (2009–10) ===
No. overall	No. in season	Title	Original release date
68	1	"Perithon!"	October 31, 2009
The allied Tribes stage a race through Perim called the Perithon following the aftermath of the M'arrillian Invasion. Kaz and Peyton have entered the race riding Yterio's Komogo when Yterio falls ill. Although it's supposed to be a race for honor, it soon becomes clear each tribe wants one of their creatures to win, no matter what the cost.
69	2	"Worlds Apart"	November 7, 2009
When Krystella's twin sister Jycella comes to Chaotic, sibling rivalries erupt. Jycella and Krystella fight as Aivenna and Nivenna respectively, but Klay has it fixed so the odds are in Krystella's favor.
70	3	"Kickin' Bot"	November 14, 2009
Kaz reveals the story behind his latest Iron Pillar scan, which started where Ulmar was working on some intelligent robots, but they become smart enough that they plan to make an army and conquer the UnderWorld.
71	4	"Hotekk's Challenge"	November 28, 2009
72	5	"Hotekk's Challenge"	December 5, 2009
CodeMaster Hotekk challenges Tom to a CodeMaster match. Kaz, Peyton, and Sarah are shocked to discover Tom is using weak creatures in his deck alongside Maxxor, though it turns out Tom had scanned them when they were getting their abilities enhanced. Tom manages to defeat Hotekk but gets only a very common scan of Dranakis Threshold. The scan however, holds a shocking secret. It functions as a portal and teleports Tom, Sarah, Peyton, and Kaz to Ancient Perim hundreds of years ago and meet Kiru, the founder of Kiru City.
73	6	"Yesterday's Heroes"	December 12, 2009
Disappointed Kiru was actually Chaor's ancestor, Tom goes to Najarin to learn more about the history of Perim and who Maxxor's ancestors are. With Najarin occupied searching for UnderWorld spy devices, Tom heads to Dranikus Threshold and travels back in time to learn for himself, meeting an ancient Najarin in the past. The exploration turns dangerous when his scanner is stolen by an Overworld thief named Vlar, who actually is Maxxor's ancestor, and he is forced to become involved in stealing crystals from Kaal, a dangerous, short-tempered creature.
74	7	"Loser's Circle"	February 6, 2010
Kaz tries to settle old scores by playing grudge matches with his Ancient Creature scans. Meanwhile, Sarah and Peyton meet up with Ancient Mipedians led by General Masaba and end up witnessing one of the first battles between the Danians and the Mipedians with the Mipedian Ajara discovering the Danians are stealing their water, the cause for the Mipedian jungle becoming the Mipedian desert. Back in Chaotic, Kaz's latest match is against SamShady who also has an Ancient Creature scan and defeats him. SamShady promises it will only be a matter of time until everyone knows about Dranakis Threshold being a portal to the past.
75	8	"A Gigantic Mission"	February 13, 2010
Kiru and his fellow OverWorlders capture Vlar so they can force him into finding the Oraklon at Gigantemtopolis, which is currently inhabited by giants. They need Vlar's skills to find it so they can trade it with Kaal for the OverWorlders working in his mine. Tom and Kaz come along in order to detect any creatures lurking in the Jungle of Life.
76	9	"Threshold of Destruction"	February 20, 2010
Tom, Sarah, Kaz, and Peyton discover many Chaotic players have made their way into the past. After repelling an attack from the UnderWorlders, Najarin angrily tells Tom and his friends to leave. In the present, Tom visits Najarin, stating he never should've learned the secrets of Dranakis Threshold. Najarin apologizes for snapping at him, saying his assistant Afjak (his son) in Ancient Perim used Dranakis Threshold after he heard Tom and Najarin talking and was never seen again. Klay and Krystells find Lord Van Bloot in M'arrillian territory shoveling coal into the ovens after fleeing from the Underworld and tell him of Dranakis Threshold. They will give him control of it and let him conquer Ancient Perim if no other players are allowed to go into the past and they go accompanied by bodyguards. The creatures of various tribes band together to stop him and Najarin uses a mugic to destroy it to put an end to this. Following its destruction, a mysterious flying island, Kaizeph, City of the Elements, appears over Perim.
77	10	"A Peytonic Adventure"	February 27, 2010
After Tom, Kaz, and Sarah watch a Chaotic Match, Peyton tells a story about mysterious agents of a peace organization who took Peyton to their headquarters and told him Roderick Rothington who is an expert counterfeiter and duels under the name of Counterfighter. The organization wants Roderick to join their organization. The counterfeiter agrees to it if Peyton wins a Chaotic match on his private island. During the card match, Peyton discovers Roderick is using counterfeit Chaotic Cards.
78	11	"Elementary"	March 6, 2010
Tom and friends encounter the Servants of the Elements, Fire, Earth, Water, and Air, from Kaizeph. They each scan one to battle to see who is the better elementalist in their group.
79	12	"Son of the Spiritlands"	March 13, 2010
Maxxor and Heptadd battle a creature named Batog who is immune to all their attacks and claims he will destroy all of Perim unless he battles Tangath Toborn. Heptadd reveals he, Batog, and Tangath Toborn come from a ghostly place called the Spiritlands and they can only stay in other places as long as they have something called a "Talazar," such as Heptadd's Crown or Tangath's Sword of Khy'at. Heptaad tells Maxxor how Tangath Toborn fought Batog before and destroyed Batog's Talazar. Tangath Toborn, however, is still frozen in the glacial wave formed from the battle with the M'arrillians. Destroying his Talazar is the only way to free him. If Maxxor does that though, Tangath will have to leave Perim forever and return to the Spiritlands, leaving Maxxor with an agonizing choice.
