= Darilyn Castillo =

American singer and actress

Darilyn Castillo is a Dominican American actress, singer, songwriter, recording artist, poet, and podcast host. Darilyn is best known for her performances in Hamilton (Puerto Rico Cast) and the off-Broadway productions of Dreamgirls and It Ain't Nothin But the Blues for which she received outstanding reviews from The New York Times, Backstage, and Playbill.

After debuting in the And Peggy Company of Hamilton, she moved to the Philip Company as Peggy Schuyler and Maria Reynolds.

In 2022, she starred in the world premiere of the play Dream Hou$e by Eliana Pipes, originating the role of Julia.

Darilyn is a recording artist and has released an EP called “Constellation." Her first music video is “Still Calling." She released her first Spanish single called “Ella Y No Conmigo” in 2021 and produced the music video for "Ella Y No Conmigo."

She is the host of the Morenita podcast, which discusses the Latinx experience.

== Biography ==
Castillo is of Dominican descent and graduated from Suffern High School in Suffern, New York. Growing up she sang in school performances, community theater, and anywhere a stage was a provided. She won the award of Rising Star Award at Suffern High School. She later attended The City College of New York where she earned a Bachelor of Arts in Theater.

At The City College of New York, Castillo made her professional debut in the Off-Broadway run of It Ain't Nothin but the Blues at New Haarlem Arts playing the roles of Carter/Eloise., Soon after, She made her second appearance in the Off-Broadway production of Fancy Nancy at Vital Theatre playing the loveable role of Bree.

Castillo played the role of Cinderella at The Nicu's Spoon Theatre Company and also starred in the production of A Sunday Morning in the South, where she received rave reviews from The New York Times, New York Post, and Backstage. Castillo went on to play the following: Mayme in the production of Intimate Apparel, Celeste in the first revival of Marie Christine (Off-Broadway), Lorraine in a regional production of All Shook Up (Millbrook Playhouse), Sarah Understudy/Ensemble in Ragtime (Westchester Broadway Theatre), Deena/Michelle (Off-Broadway), Angel in Cirque Dreams Holidaze National Tour, and Dynamite in Hairspray (Summer Theatre of New Canaan).

Currently she is the host of "Morenita" Podcast available on all podcast streaming platforms.
