= Fancy Nancy =

2005 children's picture book series

- Author: Jane O'Connor
- Illustrator: Robin Preiss Glasser
- Language: English
- Genre: children's books
- Publisher: HarperCollins Children's Books (HarperCollins)
- Publication date: 2005
- Publication place: United States
- Media type: Print (hardcover)
- Pages: 32 pp
- ISBN: 0-06-054209-8
- OCLC: 57243365
- Dewey Decimal: [E] 22
- LC Class: PZ7.O222 Fa 2006

Fancy Nancy is a 2005 children's picture book series written by Jane O'Connor and illustrated by Robin Preiss Glasser. Its first book entry spent nearly 100 weeks on the New York Times Best Seller list, resulting in the launch of a series that now spawns over 100 titles, with sales of more than 50 million volumes. Fancy Nancy has been on Publishers Weekly's bestseller list for picture books, was a Children's Book-of-the-Month Club selection, and a Junior Library Guild Selection. It also won a "Borders 2006 Original Voices" award and has been translated into 20 languages, including Hungarian and Hebrew. In April 2012, Nancy was featured in her first chapter book, Nancy Clancy: Super Sleuth. The Fancy Nancy book series have now spent 330 weeks on the New York Times Best Seller list, and in the autumn/fall of 2012, Fancy Nancy the Musical was produced by Vital Theatre Company in New York City. On March 27, 2015, Disney Junior signed for the rights to create an animated television series starring Fancy Nancy, which premiered on July 13, 2018.

== Plot introduction ==
Fancy Nancy is a young girl with a larger-than-life personality, who enjoys being what she considers fancy. She dresses in boas, tutus, ruby slippers, fairy wings, and fuzzy slippers. Nancy loves using words such as "iridescent", "ecstatic", and "extraordinary" and anything in French. She has redecorated her bedroom with feather boas, Christmas lights, paper flowers, and hats. Her favorite doll is named Marabelle Lavinia Chandelier.

Nancy captures hearts by nearly getting caught up in the glitter, but, in the end, always discovering what's truly important.

— Teri Sforza

In Nancy's opinion, her family is ordinary and dresses rather plainly, so Nancy decides to hold a class in the art of fanciness for her family. They oblige, and Nancy helps to dress them in bows, ornaments, top hats, and gaudy scarves. "Ooo-la-la!" Nancy cries in delight. "My family is posh! That's a fancy word for fancy."

== Jane O'Connor ==
Jane O'Connor is vice-president and editor-at-large for Penguin Books for Young Readers! Her sister is Jill Abramson, former editor of The New York Times. She has written more than thirty children's books. Her first adult novel, Dangerous Admissions: Secrets of a Closet Sleuth came out in July 2007.

O'Connor came up with Fancy Nancy on a summer evening. As she describes it, "It was after dinner one evening that the title just came to me," she recalls. "I sat down and wrote the first and last paragraphs. The rest of the story took me awhile, but the beginning and the end just flew into my head." O'Connor is quick to point out that much of the book's success is Glasser's artwork. She wrote the book in 2002, but it did not come out until 2005, because her editor, Margaret Anastas, insisted on Glasser as the illustrator who was busy with other projects.

== Robin Preiss Glasser ==
In 2013, Glasser was named the 2013 Illustrator of the Year by the Children's Book Council for Fancy Nancy and the Mermaid Ballet after more than 1 million young people cast their votes at the 6th annual Children's Choice Book Awards.

== Marketing ==
Fancy Nancy has spawned a line of toys and games focusing on dress-up and role play targeted towards preschoolers and children aged 5 to 7. In addition, the Fancy Nancy brand includes licenses for clothing, paper party goods, crafts, and more. Numerous bookstores and libraries around the United States have hosted events including readings by both Jane O'Connor and Robin Preiss Glasser, costume contests, "Fancy Nancy" days and tea parties.

A Fancy Nancy game called Fancy Nancy: Tea Party Time! for the Nintendo DS systems was released on September 14, 2010.

There are three Fancy Nancy apps for the iPad and iPhone: Fancy Nancy Dress Up, Fancy Nancy Explorer Extraordinaire, and Fancy Nancy Ballet School.

== Adaptations ==
In 2012, 20th Century Fox, 20th Century Fox Animation Studios and 21 Laps Entertainment announced a live-action film adaptation the book series with Tina Fey and Shawn Levy heading its production team, but nothing came to fruition in the following years since then.

On March 27, 2015, Disney Junior announced that an animated adaptation, be it television film/movie and/or TV series, of the book series were both in the works. The TV series was greenlit and renewed for a second season ahead of its premiere on July 13, 2018, in the United States and on the following day in Canada. The network ordered a second renewal of the series ahead of its second-season premiere on October 4, 2019. That renewal would be its last according to the series developer, Krista Tucker, announced its end on her LinkedIn profile after the third season which premiered simultaneously alongside Disney+ and DisneyNOW on November 12, 2021.

== Musicals ==
In 2012, Fancy Nancy the Musical was produced Off-Broadway by Vital Theatre Company. The musical is mainly based on Fancy Nancy and the Mermaid Ballet, with book and lyrics by Susan DiLallo and music and lyrics by Danny Abosch. The Original Off-Broadway Cast Recording of Fancy Nancy the Musical was released in 2013.

In 2014, Fancy Nancy: Splendiferous Christmas was produced Off-Broadway. The musical, based on the book of the same title, has a book by Matthew Hardy and Cara Lustik, music by Randy Klein and lyrics by Matthew Hardy. The Original Off-Broadway cast album was released in 2015. The production was performed in New York City and on tour during 2015 and 2016.

== Series ==
Initially, O'Connor and Glasser signed a contract for two books with HarperCollins, but after the success of the first book, they later signed to do 13 additional Fancy Nancy titles across a variety of formats. Since then, they've collaborated on 80 titles.
