= Matt Hoverman =

American actor

- Occupation: Actor, playwright
- Education: Brown University (BA); University of California, San Diego (MFA)

Website
- www.matthoverman.com

Matt Hoverman is an American actor and playwright based in Los Angeles.

Hoverman writes comedies for television (Daytime Emmy Award for Outstanding Writing in an Animated Program), theatre (FringeNYC Award for Outstanding Playwriting) and film. He is also a professional actor, voice-over artist and educator.

== Plays ==
Plays include In Transit (FringeNYC Overall Excellence Award for Outstanding Playwriting), The Audience (co-author, Drama Desk nomination for Best New Musical), The Student (winner, Samuel French OOB Short Play Festival), The Glint (Broadway reading starring Beau Bridges, Jean Smart, Michael McKean and Cecily Strong), Thrillsville (George Street Playhouse reading starring Edie Falco, Richard Kind, Grant Shaud and Adriane Lenox), Who You See Here (La Jolla Playhouse workshop, directed by Christopher Ashley), Christmas Shorts (published by Samuel French), and Searching for God in Suburbia (Huntington Theatre Breaking Ground Festival).

== Achievements ==
Five of his short plays have been finalists for the Actors Theatre of Louisville's Heideman Award. He has been in residence at the Ojai Playwrights Conference, the Edward Albee Foundation, and the Berkshire Playwrights Lab.

As a TV writer, Hoverman won the 2014 Daytime Emmy for Outstanding Writing in an Animated Program and the 2015 Humanitas Prize for Children's Animation for his work on the PBS Kids TV show Arthur. He has also written for Curious George, Sofia the First, Goldie & Bear, Fancy Nancy and Firebuds. He co-wrote the screenplay for Any Day Now by Garage Films/Albert Uria, a short film that has won 4 awards and is an official selection of over 30 film festivals.

== Others ==
His plays have been produced or developed by (among others) the La Jolla Playhouse, Naked Angels, the Pasadena Playhouse, the Barrow Group, the Huntington Theatre, The Acting Company, the Lark, Penguin Rep, the SoHo Playhouse, the Transport Group, Iama Theatre Co. (California), City Theatre (Florida), Maples Rep (Missouri), Axial Theatre Company, Bricks Theatre (Wisconsin), Phoenix Theatre (Indiana), Las Vegas Little Theatre (Nevada), Modjeska Playhouse (California), Guild Hall, Blessed Unrest, Miranda Theatre Company, Algonquin Productions and Vital Theatre Company.

Hoverman has worked with directors like Joseph Chaikin, John Rando, and Anne Bogart, on national tours and in many commercials. He is also a voice actor for animated series such as Yu-Gi-Oh! and Teenage Mutant Ninja Turtles.

Hoverman has assisted in the creation of over 200 solo shows in his Go-Solo workshops, including winners of the 2005, 2009, 2010, 2012 & 2013 FringeNYC Best Solo Show Awards.

Raised in West Redding, Connecticut by two transplanted Iowans, he studied playwriting at Brown University in Paula Vogel's graduate workshop as an undergrad (BA in theatre) and acting at the University of California, San Diego (MFA in acting).

He is a member of SAG-AFTRA, AEA, ASCAP and the Dramatists Guild.

== Partial filmography ==
- Harlock Saga—Harlock
- Shaman King — King of Sprites, Chris Venstar
- Winx Club (4Kids edit)—Codatorta
- Sonic X — Dark Oak
- Teenage Mutant Ninja Turtles—Agent Bishop (Season 3)
- One Piece—Higuma, Wapol, Pell
- Yu-Gi-Oh! GX—Mohad, Jagger
- Yu-Gi-Oh! 5D's—Jakob
- Shadow Hearts: From the New World—Natan, Killer
