= Fancy Nancy (TV series) =

- Also known as: Fancy Nancy Clancy
- Genre: Musical; Animated; Adventure; Dramedy
- Based on: Fancy Nancy by Jane O'Connor and Robin Preiss Glasser
- Developed by: Krista Tucker
- Showrunner: Krista Tucker
- Directed by: Jamie Mitchell
- Voices of: Mia Sinclair Jenness; Spencer Moss; Alyson Hannigan; Rob Riggle
- Theme music composer: Matthew Tishler; Krista Tucker
- Opening theme: "Add a Little Fancy" performed by Mia Sinclair Jenness
- Ending theme: "Add a Little Fancy" (instrumental)
- Composers: TJ Hill; Matthew Tishler
- Country of origin: United States
- Original language: English
- No. of seasons: 3
- No. of episodes: 63 (list of episodes)

Production
- Executive producers: Jamie Mitchell; Krista Tucker
- Editor: Pieter Kaufman
- Running time: 22 minutes
- Production company: Disney Television Animation (Note: Animation outsourced to Toiion Animation Studios (for season 1), Snowball Studios (for seasons 2–3) and Stellar Creative Lab (for season 2).)

Original release
- Network: Disney Junior; Disney Channel; Disney+ (season 3)
- Release: July 13, 2018 – February 18, 2022

Fancy Nancy (titled Fancy Nancy Clancy internationally) is an American animated comedy children's television series developed by Jamie Mitchell and Krista Tucker and produced by Disney Television Animation for Disney Junior based on the eponymous children's picture book series by Jane O'Connor with illustrations by Robin Preiss Glasser. The show follows the adventures of Nancy Clancy, a 6 (and then later 7) year-old girl who loves everything fancy and French, while living with her family and friends in a fictional version of Plainfield, Ohio.

The series premiered on July 13, 2018, in the United States and Canada the following day. Disney Junior renewed the series for a second season, which premiered on October 4, 2019, in the United States. On September 18, 2019, a third season was commissioned, and Krista Tucker confirmed that it would be the last for the entire series. The third season began simulcasting on Disney Junior, DisneyNOW and Disney+ on November 12, 2021. The series finale aired on February 18, 2022. Fancy Nancy received generally positive reviews from critics.

== Premise ==
6-year-old Nancy Clancy enjoys everything French and fancy, which ranges from her outfits to her creative elaborate attire. She plans to teach her ordinary family about all things fancy.

== Characters ==
- Nancy Margaret Clancy (voiced by Mia Sinclair Jenness) is a little girl who enjoys fancy things and is a bit of Francophile; she loves France and can speak French. She was 6 years old until the episode "Nancy's Parfait Birthday!", where she turned 7. Her favorite color is fuchsia, and she adores butterflies; she has a Golden Doodle named Frenchy, her own secret delivery mailbox to share all her party invitations with her best friend Bree, and own playhouse. She also has a doll named Marabelle and sometimes carries her everywhere. Her mother sometimes uses her full name when she is in trouble. Her middle name is Margaret after her late maternal grandmother. In "Paris, Adieu!", Nancy starts saving money in hopes of eventually affording to visit Paris; she finally completes her goal in the series finale.
- Josephine Jane "JoJo" Clancy (voiced by Spencer Moss) is Nancy's younger sister. She has an imaginary friend named Dudley, is a PIT (Pirate in Training), loves to help, is 3 years old but she turned 4 in "Big Top Nancy", laughs a lot, and loves her stuffed animal "Mr. Monkey".
- Douglas "Doug" Clancy (voiced by Rob Riggle) and Claire Clancy (voiced by Alyson Hannigan) are Nancy and Jojo's parents.
- Mrs. Dolores Devine (voiced by Christine Baranski) is Nancy's elderly widowed neighbor. Her name is a play on the word "divine". Her late husband's name was Ronnie.
- Franklin "Frank" Anderson (voiced by George Wendt) is Nancy's widowed maternal grandfather. His late wife was named "Margaret."
- Frenchy (talking voice in "Frenchy, Mon Amour" by Fabio Tassone) is Nancy's Golden Doodle.
- Poppy (Sid Clancy) (voiced by John Ratzenberger) is Nancy's paternal grandfather. He is a professor of geology. Grammy and Poppy live in Chicago.
- Grammy (Fay Clancy) (voiced by Miriam Flynn) is Nancy's paternal grandmother. Nancy often thinks she's a spy when she's actually a librarian who works for the government.
- Briana Rose "Bree" James (voiced by Dana Heath) is Nancy's best friend. She's also Nancy's next-door neighbor, loves nature, is a fantastique ice skater; she has a dog named Waffles and has a doll named Chiffon.
- Frederick "Freddy" James (voiced by Blake Moore) is Bree's younger brother and JoJo's best friend. He is 3 years old.
- Calvin and Gloria James (voiced by Geno Henderson and Tatyana Ali respectively) are Bree's parents.
- Mrs. Priya Singh (voiced by Aparna Nancherla) is Doug's accountant agency boss.
- Mr. Ravi Singh (voiced by Kal Penn) is Priya's husband.
- Jonathan (voiced by Ian Chen) is Nancy's cousin who also enjoys fancy stuff. Prior to the series, he went by "Johnny", but now he goes by "Jonathan". He's a magician and loves clothes.
- Gus (voiced by Chi McBride) is a local courier who makes deliveries. He can be quite goofy at times and a bit clumsy. He also hates lying and being dishonest. In the episode "Parcel Pursuit" he loses his kitten Parcel while on his mail route.
- Lionel (voiced by Malachi Barton) is a boy who is a bit of a comedian. Lionel has curly blond hair and has blue eyes. He also has a dog named Flash and a rubber chicken named Bok-Bok, which he carries with everywhere he goes, that he got to get over the chicken incident that happened when he was younger. He has an autistic cousin named Sean that he cares about in the episode "Nancy's New Friend", which he teaches Nancy to be calm around him. In the episode "Love, Lionel", he has a huge crush on Wanda and had trouble revealing his feelings to her, as she and her other friends already know him for his cracking of jokes and where Nancy tries to help him get over his fear and come clean.
- Sean (voiced by George Yionoulis) is Lionel's cousin who's autistic. He loves trains and is really educated about them.
- Brigitte (voiced by Madison Pettis) is Nancy's favorite waitress who always serves her and her friends and family their favorite pizza at the pizza parlor. She was also her and JoJo's babysitter. In the third season, Brigitte moves to Chicago to go to college.
- Grace White (voiced by Hannah Nordberg) is Nancy's frenemy. She is from a wealthy family. Grace often brags about what she has, which can sometimes annoy the other kids. In the Season 3 episode, "Grace Gets Real", however, Grace finally learns how to be humbler and not brag.
- Rhonda and Wanda (both voiced by Ruby Jay) are identical twin sisters who are Nancy's friends and Lionel has trouble telling them apart. They love to play sports. They both wear bows on their heads, each with their own pattern with Rhonda's bow having stripes and Wanda's having polka dots. They also have the first letter of their names on the side at the top of their shirts to tell them apart. They are both tomboys and they love to play sports in their backyard, and when they go to practice.
- Roberto (voiced by Nathan Arenas) is Nancy's friend and Lionel's new buddy who just moved to their neighborhood from Paris, Texas in the episode "Le Boy Next Door."
- Daisy (voiced by Darci Lynne Farmer) is Nancy's friend that she met at a Food Drive. In Season 3, she moves closer to Nancy's neighborhood.
- Lucille (voiced by Rachael MacFarlane) is Nancy's dance teacher.
- Mr. Chen (voiced by James Sie) is the shoe store owner and judge for the Plainfield ballroom dance competition.
- Flash is Lionel's dog.
- Waffles is Bree's dog.
- Serena and Venus are Rhonda and Wanda's pet hamsters. They are named after the famous tennis-playing sisters, Serena and Venus Williams.
- Fritters is Grace's pet bunny.
- Pepper is Grace's pet pony.
- Dumpling is Grace's pet Silkie chicken.
- Jean Claude is JoJo's fish that died and had a funeral in the episode "Au Revior Jean Claude".
- Jean Claude Jr. is Nancy and JoJo's fish that they got in the episode "Au Revior Jean Claude" after Jean Claude died.
- Marabelle is Nancy's favorite doll.
- Chiffon is Bree's favorite doll.
- Bok Bok is Lionel's favorite toy chicken that he likes to be funny with and makes jokes with. He carries him everywhere and got him when he was younger to get over the chicken incident.
- Penelope is Grace's favorite doll who looks identical to her.
- Flower Shop Owner is a kindly middle-aged woman who owns the Flower Shop and invites Nancy and Bree to participate in the poetry contest.

== Episodes ==
Season	Segments	Episodes	Originally released	
Season	Segments	Episodes	First released	Last released
1	49	25	July 13, 2018	August 9, 2019
2	50	25	October 4, 2019	May 9, 2021
3	24	13	November 12, 2021	February 18, 2022
Shorts	—N/a	20 (shorts)	April 8, 2019	August 9, 2020

== Release ==
Fancy Nancy premiered in the United States and in Canada on July 13, 2018. The series was later made available to stream on Disney+.

=== Home media ===
DVD release
Region	Set title	Seasons	Aspect ratio	Episode count	Time length	Release date
1	Fancy Nancy: Volume 1	1	1.78:1	6 (half-hours)	139 minutes	Nov 20, 2018

== Reception ==
=== Critical response ===
Alex Reif of LaughingPlace.com called Fancy Nancy "full of bright colors, fun characters, and musical numbers," writing, "Like the beloved book series, kids are going to think Disney's Fancy Nancy is très magnifique. Nancy will inspire viewers to be themselves and to make every day extra special. Her interests gravitate towards things that are pink and sparkly, but her personality is optimistic and friendly. Not only will kids expand their vocabulary, but they will also see a great role model for overcoming personal struggles and being a better friend." Emily Ashby of Common Sense Media gave Fancy Nancy a grade of four out of five stars, complimented the educational value, citing self-expression and individuality, and praised the depiction of positive messages and role models, stating that the show promotes respect and positivity across its characters.

Dave Trumbore of Collider included Fancy Nancy in their "2018's Best New Animated Series for Kids" list, saying that the series celebrates "uniqueness, diversity, and individuality." Azure Hall and Casey Suglia of Romper included Fancy Nancy in their "Great Shows Your Kids Will Love To Stream On Disney+" list, stating, "Although Nancy likes everything fancy, the TV series promotes individuality and self expression, rather than materialism. Throughout the show, Nancy learns about the beauty of people's differences and learns to appreciate all that makes her friends unique. This mirrors itself in the show's positive messages about family members, as Nancy loves on her younger sister and her supportive parents. While Nancy might not necessarily be your cup of tea, you have to give credit to a show that teaches kids to embrace their truest selves."

Nuray Bulbul of WalesOnline included Fancy Nancy in their "6 Best Disney Plus animated films and TV shows in 2021" list, asserting, "From her vast vocabulary to her creative attire, six-year-old Nancy is one to look out for. A high-spirited young girl whose imagination and enthusiasm transforms the ordinary into the extraordinary - showcases it's important to make the most of each day and encourage others to do the same." Charles Curtis of USA Today ranked Fancy Nancy 6th in their "20 Best Shows For Kids Right Now (March 2020)" list.

=== Accolades ===
Year	Award	Category	Nominee(s)	Result	Ref.
2019	Daytime Emmy Awards	Outstanding Directing for a Preschool Animated Program	Mircea Mantta, Jamie Mitchell	Nominated	
2019	Daytime Emmy Awards	Outstanding Writing for a Preschool Animated Program	Krista Tucker, Matt Hoverman, Laurie Israel, Andrew Guerdat	Nominated	
2020	NAMIC Vision Awards	Animation	Fancy Nancy	Nominated	
2021	GLAAD Media Awards	Outstanding Children's Programming	Fancy Nancy	Nominated	
2021	Annie Awards	Outstanding Achievement for Writing in an Animated Television/Media Production	Krista Tucker, Andrew Guerdat, Matt Hoverman, Laurie Israel, Marisa Evans	Nominated	
2022	GLAAD Media Awards	Outstanding Children's Programming	Fancy Nancy	Nominated	
2022	Children's and Family Emmy Awards	Outstanding Original Song	Philip Bentley, Matthew Tishler, Andy Guerdat (for "If You Have a Dream")	Nominated	
