= Chaotic Trading Card Game =

Collectible card game

Enter The Code
- The card back to Chaotic TCG
- Designers: Martin Rauff, Sam Murakami, To Be Continued LLC (originally by Dracco Company Ltd.)
- Illustrators: Stone Perales; Khary Randolph (original illustrator unknown)
- Publishers: Chaotic USA and TC Digital Games
- Players: Two Players
- Setup time: Varies depending on size of game (Automatic for the Online Game)
- Playing time: Varies depending on size of game
- Chance: Low
- Skills: Card playing Arithmetic; Basic Reading Ability

Chaotic is a collectible card game that was developed by 4Kids Entertainment. It was released on October 24, 2007, in North America along with the open beta version of the online game, and later discontinued on October 1, 2010.

In May 2026, Chaotic Entertainment announced it had partnered with Panini America to relaunch the game later that year.

== Development ==
In 2000, the trading card game "Grolls & Gorks" was released in Denmark, and in 2001 was relaunched as "Chaotic: Now Or Never!" In 2005, 4Kids Entertainment acquired the rights to the game. The name was shortened to "Chaotic" and the property reworked to make it more appealing to North American audiences. The cards were redesigned by Sam Murakami, who previously worked to localize the Yu-Gi-Oh! TCG in the U.S., and Martin Rauff, the designer of the original Danish game. The new card art was created by artists including Khary Randolph. On October 24, 2007, the Chaotic TCG officially became available for sale at comic and hobby shops in the United States.

== Gameplay ==
Both players begin with an equal number of creatures on the board - the most common configurations are 1, 3, 6, or 10 creatures for each player. The objective of the game is to eliminate all the creatures of the opposing player. There are five types of cards in the game, each with unique abilities. These types are Creature, Attack, Location, Battlegear, and Mugic.

=== Building a Deck ===
Each player constructs the deck they want to use before starting the game. A deck may contain a number of Creatures (as above), with 1 Mugic and 1 Battlegear per Creature. Additionally, each player constructs a Location deck of 10 cards and an Attack deck of 20 cards. Each card is limited to 2 copies of it (by name) in a player's deck.

Some cards have other deckbuilding restrictions:

- If a card is "Unique," only one copy of it can be in a player's deck.
- If a card is "Loyal" or states "(This card) cannot enter mixed armies," then it may not be used unless all of the player's Creatures are from the same Tribe.
- Only one "Legendary" card may be in a player's entire deck.
- Each attack card has a build point value from 0-5, with more powerful attacks having higher build point values. The sum of all build point values of cards in a player's attack deck may not exceed 20.

=== Creature Cards ===
Creature Cards are cards that players choose to make up their armies. These cards have up to six possible background colors based on the "tribe" with which creature is associated. The tribes are listed as "OverWorld" (Blue), "UnderWorld" (Red), Danian (Brown), Mipedian (Yellow), M'arrillian (black), and creatures unaffiliated with any tribe, called "Tribeless" (White). Certain creatures have abilities that are either active at all times ("Innate"), activated at will, triggered by certain circumstances or events, or activate when specific creatures are on the field ("Brainwashed"). Unlike the actual game, the animated series depicted creatures having to manually carry all of their Battlegear and their Mugic with them.

=== Battlegear Cards ===
Each creature in an Army is permitted to be equipped with one Battlegear Card, as opposed to the animated series, where players may equip their creatures with spectral viewers and one additional Battlegear. Battlegear are often depicted as weapons, equipment, or vehicles that the equipped creature can utilize. Each creature can only use their own Battlegear in a battle. When a creature is defeated, both it and the Battlegear card are sent to the discard pile. At the beginning of the game, Battlegear is set underneath a player's Creature Card, face-down. When the creature engages in battle, the Battlegear Card is flipped face-up and revealed, where its effects will activate.

=== Location cards ===
Each player builds a 10-card location deck. At the beginning of the game, each player's location Deck is shuffled and placed face down on the table. At the beginning of a player's turn, that player flips over the top card of their location deck. Location cards are used to determine Initiative (who attacks first in battle), either by Tribe, Element, or Discipline. If both creatures in battle are from the same Tribe or have the same score for the Discipline in question, then the attacking player has the initiative. Location cards also have a second ability which will modify the game (usually during combat) in some other way.

=== Attack cards ===
Damage is dealt through the use of attack cards. Each player must have a 20-card attack deck, which is shuffled and placed face down. Players draw 2 attack cards at the beginning of the game, and always have at least 2 attack cards in their hand at all times. When it is a player's turn to "strike", they draw a third attack card and select one of the 3 attack cards to play. A player must play an attack card during each of their turns. Damage to creatures is calculated by the following equation.

Total Damage dealt with 1 attack card = Base Damage + Elemental Damage + Attack card Text Box Damage + Creature Card Text Box Damage + Battlegear Damage (If applicable) + Location Damage (If applicable)

The players then alternate striking each other creatures in a battle, starting with the creature that has the initiative. A Creature is defeated when it sustains damage greater than or equal to its current energy.

=== Mugic cards ===
Each player selects the same number of Mugic cards as creatures that they are using. Mugic cards are held in the player's hand with the three attack cards. Mugic cards will either be tribe associated (meaning only one tribe can use them), and have the tribe color in the caption boxes, or they can be generic (meaning any tribe can use them). Creatures must have Mugic counters greater than or equal to the required cost on the Mugic card in order to use it. Generic, Overworld, Underworld, Danian, and Mipedian mugic cards cost 3 or less mugic counters. M'arrillian mugic cards can cost up to 10 mugic counters. Sometimes mugic cards are affected by the location, for example, in Wood Pillar, Overworld mugic costs 1 extra mugician.

=== Armies ===
Each player lays out their creature cards in a triangular formation at the start of the game. This is called their Army. Officially, Armies can have 1, 3, 6 or 10 creatures in them, though sizes of 15, 21, or even 28 or larger are possible if players have enough cards. The different sizes correspond to different degrees of difficulty: battling with 1 or 3 creatures is considered an "easy to play" match, suitable for new Chaotic players, with 6 and 10 being the "standard" sizes and larger sizes being for more advanced matches. (The animated series once featured a 105-versus-105 size, with each side using 105 creatures; however, this battle was never finished, as both players were undeniably exhausted.) Players place their creatures face-up in the formation of an inverted triangle, with the bases of the two triangles placed against each other. Players also select one Battlegear per creature to equip to them.

On a player's turn, they may move each of their creatures once per turn, but only one space on the playing mat each unless otherwise specified. A battle is initiated when a player moves their creature onto a space containing an opponent's creature on the playing mat. Each player may initiate one battle per turn.

=== Other rules ===
A "burst" occurs when a player plays an attack card, mugic card, or a Creature or Battlegear's trigger abilities are activated. This is similar to the "stack" from Magic: The Gathering. Once a burst has started, players alternate adding to the burst with their own abilities or effects. Once both players agree to stop adding to the burst, the effects are resolved starting from the last card effect or ability down to the card that started the burst.

There are very little differences between the official rules and the rules of the OCG. The OCG had a deck composed only of cards with the discipline symbols on them called the "Discipline Deck". The attacking player turns over the top card of the "Discipline Deck" to determine the type of contest between the opposing creatures. The creatures' discipline stats are enhanced or reduced by the Battlegear attached, or the location. The players then draw "Power Cards" that have multiples of five printed on the cards. The players take turns to draw power cards which reduce the stat of the selected discipline of the opposing creature. The first player to reduce the selected stat of the opponent's creature to zero is the winner of the battle. These battles continue until one player has defeated all of his or her opponent's creatures. At the end of each battle, if an engaged creature has gained elementals during battle it loses that/those elements.

== Card Rarities ==
The introduction of the ChaoticCoins allows members to get points for the cards that they upload, depending on their rarity.

- Common: This is shown with a black Chaotic symbol. Worth 10 ChaoticCoins.
- Uncommon: This is shown with a green Chaotic symbol. Worth 20 ChaoticCoins. As of the Alliances Unraveled expansion, uncommon is no longer a rarity.
- Rare: This is shown with a gold Chaotic symbol. Worth 40 ChaoticCoins.
- Super Rare: This is shown with a silver Chaotic symbol with the word "Super" written under its lower half. Worth 80 ChaoticCoins.
- Ultra Rare: This is shown with a silver Chaotic symbol with the word "Ultra" written under its lower half. Worth 160+ ChaoticCoins.

== Card Sets ==
There have been a total of three expansions to the card game including the original, each featuring different sub-sets or series.

Set	Type	Release Date	Description	Additions	Size	Notes
Dawn of Perim: Secrets	Base		The initial expansion of the card game had cards that were directly tied in with the first season of the show.	N/A		
Zenith of the Hive	Expansion		Introduced the new infection statuses which could be utilized by Danians.	Danian parasites and Controllers		
Silent Sands	Expansion		Introduced the new Warbeast and Conjuror titles for Mipedians	Mipedian Warbeasts and Conjurors		
M'arrillian Invasion: Beyond the Doors	Base		This expansion fell in line with the release of the second season of the show and introduced a fifth tribe, the M'arrillians.	Fifth tribe M'arrillians and brainwashed Minons.		
Rise of the Oligarch	Expansion		Introduced Fluidmorpher and Kha'rall titles for M'arrillians. Unlike the Chieftain M'arrillians, these types of M'arrillians cannot make minions use brainwashed text.	M'arrillian Fluidmorphers and Kha'ralls		
Turn of the Tide	Expansion		Showcased newer iterations of previous creatures and new creatures without brainwashed text			
Forged Unity	Expansion		Showcased new and redesigned creatures with a focus on abilities for armies consisting of multiple tribes.			
Secrets of the Lost City: Alliances Unraveled	Base		Last set released	Tribless and Past creatures		
Fire and Stone	Expansion		Canceled			
Storm and Sea	Expansion		Canceled			
Elemental Emperors	Expansion		Canceled			

== Online Game ==
Chaotic Online
- Developers: 4Kids Entertainment, TC Digital Games, Chaotic USA
- Publisher: Chaotic USA
- Designers: Martin Rauff, Sam Murakami, To Be Continued LLC (originally Dracco)
- Platform: Microsoft Windows (and Intel Macs)
- Release: NA: October 2007; EU: 2008; AU: 2008
- Genres: Fantasy, science fiction, trading card game, MMOTCG, TV tie-in, campaign/battle card driven, hand management

There was an online version of the game, which is in sync with the material card game. Each physical card has a 12-digit alphanumeric code to upload it to a player's online deck. It allows said player to trade, battle, build creature armies, read the lore of the game and more. However, some promotional cards are not allowed to be uploaded.

== Organized play ==
There are three ways to participate in Chaotic TCG tournaments. The first one is somewhat traditional, as it involves going to the retailer and playing using the physical cards. The second method is going online and participate in the online tournaments. The third is a combination of both, where the certain retailers offer their own online tournaments that can only be played at the retailer's store. When players win in tournaments they receive "tournament points" that allow access to special features in the online game.

When going to a retailer's store to participate in a tournament, there are two types of tournaments that will be organized for the event: Organized Play and Sealed Deck tournaments. Most tournaments follow the traditional Swiss format.

Organized Play Tournaments are when players must bring their own cards to the event, and build their deck with nothing but their own cards. They must build their decks accordingly to the chosen format the event has decided to run (e.g. 6v6 Masters) and then play other players in order to earn a spot into the top players. After a set number of rounds, matches become single elimination, until the top four. After the top 4, a winner will be declared and wins said prizes(*).

Sealed Deck Tournaments are when players must pay an entrance fee in order to get into the tournament, always. After the sign-up, each player is normally given 1 starter deck and 5 booster packs, which then they must build a deck (using only those cards) accordingly to the chosen format the event has decided to run and then play other players in order to earn a spot into the top players. After a set number of rounds, matches become single elimination, until the top four. After the top four are decided, a winner will be declared and wins said prizes. Prizes are given to all players; however, the top players are awarded more prizes.

== Product information ==
=== Booster packs ===
Like most trading card games, booster packs are sold to distribute cards. The booster packs of this game contain nine cards per pack, which includes two foil cards. The current MSRP for the booster packs is $2.40. Two covers were originally made, one with Blugon and Khugar on it, and the other with Ibiaan and Siado. The covers for the Zenith of the Hive set are Kelvedran and Illexia, while the covers for Silent Sands feature Melke and Gnarlus. All the Dawn of Perim and M'arrilian Invasion booster packs contained two rare cards in every pack, but as of Alliances Unraveled there are three rare cards in each pack.

=== Starter decks ===
Two starter decks were released alongside the initial set, "Dawn of Perim: Overworld" and "Dawn of Perim: Underworld". As their names suggest, the decks contain only one type of creature card. Each starter deck contains: 52 cards (although only 48 cards would actually be used to play the game), with two non-game cards within the 52 cards; a rulebook, and a game mat. Three new decks (one for each tribe) were released with the M'arrilian Invasion set in September 2008. Unlike Dawn of Perim and M'arrillian Invasion, Secrets of the Lost City does not show the tribe of the starter deck on the box. Each starter deck contains three rare cards and one super rare card, chances being a one out of five that the super will be replaced with an ultra rare card.

=== Demo Decks ===
Chaoticgame.com announced that two demo decks, playmats, and a rulebook can be provided free at the Chaotic Website in PDF format to give players a chance to learn and play the game before purchase. The demo cards have no chaotic code- thus cannot be submitted online- and have a "DEMO" watermark over each card's image.

== History ==
Before its current form, the Chaotic Trading Card Game had several names and versions. Starting in Denmark, Dracco Heads was a children's collectors product featuring plastic figurines of strange creatures. In 2000, a trading card game called Grolls & Gorks was published featuring characters and creatures from Dracco Heads. The next year, the game was redesigned by Bryan C. Gannon, and renamed Chaotic: Now or Never! This version of the card game had many characters and cards on which the current version of the Chaotic game and the television series are based.

=== Dracco Heads ===
Dracco Heads was a kids' collectors' product sold by Dracco Company Ltd. Dracco Heads featured small plastic figures shaped like heads of strange creatures. A few of these Dracco Heads were given both names and purposes for game play. Dracco Heads were very similar to Crazy Bones.

Over time, Dracco Company Ltd. started making new sets for the Dracco Heads Collection, such as Jumbo Dracco Heads, Baby Dracco Heads, and the Dracco Heads 2nd Edition. The Jumbo Dracco Heads were identical to the originals except for being three times as large, while the Baby Dracco Heads were smaller versions that aimed to be more charming than the originals.

The third Dracco Heads expansion set was called Dracco Heads 2. This set featured 41 entirely new Dracco Heads divided into two factions, the Gorkovi and the Grollovi; in the current Chaotic mythology, these groups would correspond to the Underworlders and the Overworlders. The expansion also introduced the Dracco Stone, which corresponds to the Cothica.

Beyond the lack of Danians and Mipedians, the most significant difference between the current Chaotic mythology and the Dracco Heads 2 mythology is their origin stories. In Dracco Heads 2, the Grollovi's spaceship had crash landed on a planet inhabited by the Gorkovi, and in the process, the ship's cargo, the Dracco Stone, was lost. The Gorkovi, upon finding out about the stone, wanted to find it so that they could use it to rule the universe; the Grollovi, on the other hand, simply needed it to give their spaceship enough power to return to their home planet.

=== Grolls & Gorks ===
In 2000 a TCG known as Grolls & Gorks was born. In this trading card game (TCG) the creatures on the cards were mostly from the Dracco Heads 2nd edition, though Location cards were a new addition. Grolls & Gorks was not only a TCG but it was also a Coin Game. It featured plastic coins that had the faces of the Grolls & Gorks creatures on them.

In the Grolls & Gorks TCG, the words GROLLOVI and GORKOVI refer to the creature types. GROLLOVI are the OverWorlder creatures and GORKOVI are the UnderWorlder creatures.

=== Chaotic: Now or Never! ===
Chaotic: Now or Never!
- Designers: originally Dracco Company Ltd.
- Publishers: Apex Marketing, Inc.
- Players: 2
- Chance: Medium
- Skills: Card playing Arithmetic; Basic Reading Ability

In the year 2001 the Grolls & Gorks TCG was turned into Chaotic: Now Or Never! It still featured some of the original creatures from Grolls & Gorks, such as Screamer, TwinHead, Gork, Pingo, Wakko (now known as Yokkis), Clapper (now known as Klasp), and many others. There were also some creatures in the Chaotic: Now Or Never! TCG that came directly from the first edition of Dracco Heads, such as Diablo (now known as Chaor) and Mr. Muscles. Mr. Muscles's name was soon turned into Muxsle, which in 2007 was again changed to Stelgar.

=== Now or Never! storyline ===
The story of Chaotic: Now Or Never! is the epic tale of two boys, Tom and Kazdan, and their adventures in Perim, a volatile land where fierce battles are fought trying to capture The Chaos Rock and the control of Perim.

One day, Tom, a smart and curious 12-year-old, finds a pair of rings in his back yard. The rings, Athala and Na'arin (the Ring Of Na'arin is a Battlegear card in the new Chaotic game), are really magical portals to a clandestine realm known as Perim. However, before Tom has the chance to uncover the secret of the rings, the school bully, Kazdan, shows up. Kazdan is a strong 14-year-old boy who is Tom's never-failing rival. Kazdan spots Tom examining one of the rings and manages to steal it from him. Kazdan is unaware of the other ring that is in Tom's backpack. Shortly thereafter, both boys discover that putting on the rings enables them to enter Perim.

Perim is a place of great adventures and epic tales. It is inhabited by five tribes of creatures: the Danians, The Deep Ones, the Mipedians, the OverWorlders, and the UnderWorlders. The OverWorlders and UnderWorlders are constantly warring, while the other tribes keep to themselves and have an air of mystery about them. The OverWorlders are good, kind, innovative and curious. The UnderWorlders are evil, malicious, destructive, and dominating. Tom finds his friends among the OverWorlders while Kazdan finds his with the UnderWorlders.

The two tribes are both interested in peace in Perim, but where the UnderWorlders want peace through supremacy, the OverWorlders want peace through diplomacy. The OverWorlders and the UnderWorlders are of similar strength and size, however individuals in the two tribe vary greatly. To get the upper hand in the struggle between the OverWorld and the UnderWorld, both groups search for the legendary artifact known as the "Chaos Rock". With control of the Chaos Rock, either group could rule Perim. Hence the two groups constantly search and battle for the stone.

The Chaos Rock and the struggle to secure it are the catalysts for endless adventures in the world of Perim. Perim has been built with great level of detail permitting all creatures and locations to have their own integrated story; the land has its legends and the places have their pasts.

=== Current Chaotic game ===
Soon, 4kids Entertainment signed a contract with Apex Marketing, the creators of Chaotic: Now Or Never! and Grolls & Gorks, and brought Chaotic to the US. In order to keep the popularity up, they changed the names of some of the creature, location, weapon, and spell cards, as well as the card design, appearance, and card types. Weapon cards are now known as battle gear, and spell cards are now known as mugic.

The story line was also changed for both the game and the TV series. For example, in the original story, Tom and Kazdan were enemies, not friends, and the Cothica was originally known as the Dracco Kamen (meaning "Dracco Stone") and later as the Chaos Rock.

At some point, ChaoticUSA.com was turned into a redirect page for chaoticgame.com and all of the content on the old website was deleted.

=== Hiatus ===
After a website update in August 2010, the website stopped updating and the card next set in production was indefinitely delayed. The website still remains however. In spite of this Hiatus, Chaotic still celebrated its fifth anniversary on October 23, 2012, with a staff battle event, and a slight visual change was made to the main website. However, for whatever reason, the announcement on the forums did not effect the "Mega Roar" announcement section of the front page (this has since been fixed).

=== Closure ===
4Kids filed bankruptcy in 2014 and reorganized under the name 4Licensing. 4Licensing filed Chapter 11 bankruptcy in 2017, dissolving the company as a result. A reboot of the Chaotic franchise is in progress according to the president of TC Digital Games, Bryan C Gannon.

=== Revival ===
In May 2026, Chaotic Entertainment announced it had partnered with Panini America to relaunch the game and an "online experience" supported by AWS Games. New cards would be manufactured and released sold at hobby stores starting in October 2026, followed by major retailers in January 2027. In addition, all 79 Chaotic animated episodes will be published online and upscaled to High-definition video.
