= Robin Preiss Glasser =

American illustrator

- Glasser in 2024
- Born: 1956 (age 69–70); Poughkeepsie, New York
- Education: Parsons The New School for Design
- Occupation: Illustrator

Robin Preiss Glasser (born 1956) is an American illustrator, best known for her work on the Fancy Nancy series of children's picture books (from 2005), written by Jane O'Connor.

== Early life and education ==
Glasser was raised in a Jewish family in Poughkeepsie, New York, one of four sisters including the children's writer Jacqueline Preiss Weitzman. She earned her high school diploma from the Professional Children's School in Manhattan while attending the apprentice program at the American Ballet Theatre school.

== Career ==
Glasser was a professional ballet dancer before becoming an illustrator for children’s books. She was a soloist with the Pennsylvania Ballet until injuring her back. She returned to school at age 30 and earned her Bachelor of Fine Arts from Parsons School of Design/The New School.

It was five years of odd-job illustration work after graduating from Parsons before Glasser was asked to illustrate Alexander, Who's Not (Do You Hear Me? I Mean It!) Going to Move by Judith Viorst, published by Atheneum Books in 1995. It was a sequel to the successful Alexander and the Terrible, Horrible, No Good, Very Bad Day (Atheneum, 1972). She and her sister, Jacqueline Weitzman, collaborated on You Can't Take a Balloon Into the Metropolitan Museum, which featured an adventure through the streets of New York City and was named an ALA Notable Book for 1998. Twenty years later, the Children's Literature Association (ChLA) gave the book a Phoenix Picture Book Award. Glasser went on to illustrate picture books with writers including radio star Garrison Keillor, poet Elizabeth Garton Scanlon, and Sarah Ferguson, Duchess of York.

She also collaborated on three books with Lynne Cheney, the wife of the then Vice President, whom she first met in 2001.

In 2005 Glasser was paired with the writer Jane O’Connor to illustrate the Fancy Nancy books. Books in the series, which now number more than 80 titles, have spent over 330 weeks on the New York Times Best Sellers list, and have sold more than 48 million volumes.

Disney Junior turned Glasser's most popular character into an animated television heroine, with the Disney Fancy Nancy (TV series) debuting on July 13, 2018, and the animation company greenlit a second season even before the show premiered. Disney Junior ordered a third season of the Emmy Award-nominated series ahead of its October 4, 2019, Season Two premiere. Disney's supporting licensing program included a life-size face character at the Disney theme parks and on cruise ships world-wide.

In the fall of 2025, the 20th anniversary of the launch of the Fancy Nancy book series will bring a new adventure from the original creators, O'Connor and Glasser. Fancy Nancy: Besties for Eternity is a story about new friends, old friends, and the magic of lasting friendship.

Glasser continues to collaborate with the international best-selling author Ann Patchett. They met while Glasser was on a book tour for Fancy Nancy at Patchett's Nashville book store Parnassus Books. Lambslide, Patchett's first book for children, was published on May 7, 2019. The second book by the duo, Escape Goat, was released in the fall of 2020, and The Verts: A Story of Introverts and Extroverts was published in 2024. Button at the Book Store is coming out in 2026.

Glasser returned to her ballet roots to illustrate Grand Jeté and Me, with New York City Ballet legend Allegra Kent. In 2020, American Ballet Theatre and Penguin Random House began a collaborative publishing program and asked Glasser to write and illustrate a story based on what she felt like as a child, so crazy about dancing that it was all she wanted to do. Gloria's Promise: A Ballet Dancer's First Step was written with her sister Jacqueline Preiss Weitzman and published in March 2023. In Spring 2025, the duo teamed up again for Flower Girls: A Story of Sisters.

== Awards and recognition ==
The Children's Book Council named Glasser 2013 Illustrator of the Year for Fancy Nancy and the Mermaid Ballet after more than 1 million young people voted in the 6th annual Children's Choice Book Awards.

In 2015 she was named one of the 100 Most Influential People in Orange County, California.

== Personal life ==
She lives in San Juan Capistrano with her husband, attorney Robert Berman. Glasser has an adult son and daughter. Glasser is a two-time breast cancer survivor.
