= Index of DOS games (G) =

This is an index of DOS games.

This list has been split into multiple pages. Please use the Table of Contents to browse it.

| Title | Released | Developer(s) | Publisher(s) |
|---|---|---|---|
| Gabriel Knight: Sins of the Fathers | 1993 | Sierra On-Line | Sierra On-Line |
| Gadget: Invention, Travel, & Adventure | 1993 | Synergy, Inc. | Synergy, Inc. |
| Galactic Empire | 1990 | Tomahawk | Coktel Vision |
| Galactic Gladiators | 1983 | Strategic Simulations | Strategic Simulations |
| Galactic Warrior Rats | 1993 | Mikev Design | Summit Software |
| Galactix | 1992 | Cygnus Software | Cygnus Software |
| Galaxian | 1983 | Atari | Atarisoft |
| Game Over | 1988 | Dinamic Software | Imagine Software |
| Game Over II | 1987 | Dinamic Software | Dinamic Software |
| The Games '92: España | 1992 | Creative Materials | Ocean Software |
| Games - Winter Challenge | 1991 | Ballistic | Accolade |
| Gary Grigsby's Pacific War | 1992 | Strategic Simulations | Strategic Simulations |
| Gary Grigsby's Pacific War | 2000 | Matrix Games | Matrix Games |
| Gary Grigsby's War in Russia | 1993 | Strategic Simulations | Strategic Simulations |
| Gateway II: Homeworld | 1993 | Legend Entertainment | Legend Entertainment |
| Gateway to the Savage Frontier | 1991 | Stormfront Studios | Strategic Simulations |
| Gateworld | 1993 | Homebrew Software | Homebrew Software |
| GATO | 1983 | Spectrum Holobyte | Spectrum Holobyte |
| Gauntlet | 1988 | | Mindscape |
| Gauntlet II | 1989 | | Mindscape |
| Gazza II | 1991 | Empire Software | Empire Software |
| GBA Championship Basketball: Two-on-Two | 1986 | Dynamix | Activision |
| Geisha | 1990 | Coktel Vision | Tomahawk |
| Gemfire | 1992 | Koei | Koei |
| Gender Wars | 1996 | The 8th Day | SCi |
| Gene Machine, The | 1996 | Bullfrog Productions | Electronic Arts |
| Genewars | 1996 | Bullfrog Productions | Electronic Arts |
| Genghis Khan | 1989 | Koei | Koei |
| Genghis Khan II: Clan of the Gray Wolf | 1993 | Koei | Koei |
| Gettysburg: The Turning Point | 1986 | Strategic Simulations | Strategic Simulations |
| Ghostbusters | 1986 | Activision | Activision |
| Ghostbusters II | 1989 | Dynamix | Activision |
| Ghosts 'N Goblins | 1987 | Pacific Dataworks International | Capcom |
| Global Conquest | 1992 | Microplay Software | Microplay Software |
| Global Domination | 1993 | Impressions Games | Impressions Games |
| Gnome Ranger | 1987 | Level 9 | Level 9 |
| Goal II | 1992 | Wizard Games | New Generation Software |
| Gobliiins | 1992 | Coktel Vision | Coktel Vision |
| Gobliins 2: The Prince Buffoon | 1992 | Coktel Vision | Sierra On-Line |
| Goblins Quest 3 | 1993 | Coktel Vision | Sierra On-Line |
| Godfather, The | 1991 | U.S. Gold | U.S. Gold |
| God of Thunder | 1993 | Adept Software | Software Creations |
| Gods | 1991 | Bitmap Brothers | Renegade software |
| Golden Axe | 1989 | Virgin Games | Virgin Games |
| Golden Basket | 1990 | Opera Sports | Opera Soft |
| Gold Rush! | 1988 | Doug MacNeill, Ken MacNeill | Sierra On-Line |
| Goldrunner | 1993 | James Dingle | |
| Gone Fishin' | 1994 | SimGraph | Amtex |
| Goody | 1987 | Opera Soft | Opera Soft |
| Gorillas | 1991 | Microsoft Game Studios | Microsoft Game Studios |
| Grandest Fleet, The | 1993 | Fogstone Enterprises | Quantum Quality Productions |
| Grandmaster Chess | 1993 | IntraCorp | Capstone Software |
| Grand Monster Slam | 1989 | Golden Goblins | Rainbow Arts |
| Grand Prix 2 | 1995 | MicroProse | MicroProse |
| Grand Prix Circuit | 1988 | Random Access, Distinctive Software | Accolade |
| Grand Theft Auto | 1997 | DMA Design | ASC Games |
| Grand Theft Auto: London 1969 | 1999 | Rockstar Canada | Rockstar Games |
| Gravity Force | 1989 | Kingsoft GmbH | Kingsoft GmbH |
| Gravity Wars | 1989 | Sohrab Ismail‑Beigi | |
| Great Escape, The | 1986 | Denton Designs | Ocean Software |
| Great Naval Battles: Guadalcanal 1942-1943 | 1994 | Strategic Simulations | Strategic Simulations |
| Great Naval Battles: North Atlantic 1939-1943 | 1992 | Strategic Simulations | Strategic Simulations |
| Great Naval Battles - Fury in the Pacific 1941-1944 | 1995 | Strategic Simulations | Strategic Simulations |
| Gremlins | 1984 | Atari | Atarisoft |
| Gremlins 2 - The New Batch | 1991 | Hi-Tech Expressions | Hi-Tech Expressions |
| Gremlins 2 - The New Batch | 1990 | Topo Soft | Elite Systems, Erbe Software |
| Guerrilla War | 1987 | Quicksilver Software | Data East |
| Guild of Thieves, The | 1987 | Magnetic Scrolls | Rainbird Software |
| Guilty | 1995 | Divide By Zero | Psygnosis |
| Gulf Strike | 1985 | Microcomputer Games | Avalon Hill |
| Gunboat | 1990 | Accolade | Accolade |
| Gunmetal | 1998 | Mad Genius Software | Mad Genius Software |
| Gunship | 1991 | MicroProse | MicroProse |
| Gunship 2000 | 1991 | MicroProse | MicroProse |
| Gunship 2000 Scenario Disk and Mission Builder | 1992 | MicroProse | MicroProse |
| Guy Spy and the Crystals of Armageddon | 1992 | ReadySoft | ReadySoft |
| GX Games | 1991 | Genus Microprogramming | Genus Microprogramming |
