= List of CD-i games =

This is a list of games made on the CD-i format, organised alphabetically by name. It includes cancelled games as well as actual releases. There are currently 209 games on this list; the vast majority were published by Philips Interactive Media. See Lists of video games for related lists.

== Games ==
Title	Developer	Publisher	Release date	U.S. release	EU release	Multi-player support	Digital Video Card status
3rd Degree	PF.Magic	Philips Interactive Media	1993	Yes	No		
The 7th Guest	Trilobyte	Philips Interactive Media	1993	Yes	Yes		Required
A la Découverte des Contes	Edusoft	Philips Interactive Media	1994				
Accelerator	SPC Vision	Philips Interactive Media	1997			1-2 players	
ADI 3ème – Français et Maths	Coktel Vision	Philips Interactive Media	1993				
ADI 4ème – Français et Maths	Coktel Vision	Philips Interactive Media	1993				
ADI 5ème – Français et Maths	Coktel Vision	Philips Interactive Media	1993				
ADI 6ème – Français et Maths	Coktel Vision	Philips Interactive Media	1993				
ADI CE1 – Français et Maths	Coktel Vision	Philips Interactive Media	1993				
ADI CE2 – Français et Maths	Coktel Vision	Philips Interactive Media	1993				
ADI CM1 – Français et Maths	Coktel Vision	Philips Interactive Media	1993				
ADI CM2 – Français et Maths	Coktel Vision	Philips Interactive Media	1993				
The Adventure of the Space Ship Beagle	Denshi Media Services	Denshi Media Services	1990				
L'affaire Morlov	CPIO Multimedia	Philips Interactive Media	1996				
Alfapet	Adatek	Philips Interactive Media	1993			1-4 players	
Alice in Wonderland	Spinnaker Software	Philips Interactive Media	1992				
Alien Gate	SPC Vision	Philips Interactive Media	1993				
All the Fun of the Fair	CODIM Interactive Media C.V.	Philips Interactive Media	1993				
L'Ange et le Demon	Philips Interactive Media	Philips Interactive Media	1992				
The Apprentice	The Vision Factory	Philips Interactive Media	1994	Yes	Yes		Optional
Arcade Classics	Namco	Philips Interactive Media	1996	No	Yes	2 simultaneous players	
Archeon CD-i Quiz	Dutch Electronic Publishers	Wigant Interactive Media	1994	No	Yes	1-2 players	
Asterix: Caesar's Challenge	Infogrames Multimedia	Philips Interactive Média France; Pathé Interactive	1995				
Atlantis - The Last Resort	Philips Interactive Media	Philips Interactive Media	1997				Required
Axis & Allies	Capitol Disc Interactive	Philips Interactive Media	1994			1-5 players	
Backgammon	Capitol Disc Interactive	Philips Interactive Media	1992			1-2 players	
Battleship	Capitol Disc Interactive	Philips Interactive Media	1991			1-2 players	
The Berenstain Bears On Their Own, And You On Your Own	Philips Interactive Media	Philips Interactive Media	1993				
Big Bang Show	Infogrames Multimedia	Philips Interactive Média France	1992				
BMP Puzzle	DOKU	ZYX Music	1994	No	Yes		
Brain Dead 13	ICDI	Philips Interactive Media	1997	No	Yes		Required
Burn Cycle	Trip Media	Philips Interactive Media	1994				
Caesar's World of Boxing	CD-i Systems	Philips Interactive Media	1993			2 simultaneous players	Required
Caesar's World of Gambling	CD-i Systems	Philips Interactive Media	1991			1-4 players	
Cartoon Carnival	Funhouse	Philips Interactive Media	1993				Required
CD Shoot	Eagle Vision	Philips Interactive Media	1992			1-5 players	
Chaos Control	Infogrames	Philips Interactive Média France	1995				Required
Christmas Country	DIMA	Philips Interactive Media	1996				Required
Christmas Crisis	Creative Multimedia Corporation	Philips Interactive Media	1995				Required
Cluedo	3T Productions Ltd	Philips Interactive Media	1994			1-6 players	Required
Cluedo: The Mysteries Continue	3T Productions Ltd	Philips Interactive Media	1995				Required
Connect Four	Capitol Disc Interactive	Philips Interactive Media	1991			1-2 players	
The Crayon Factory	Philips Sidewalk Studio	Philips Interactive Media	1995				
Creature Shock	Argonaut Games	Data East	1994	No	Yes		Required
Crime Patrol	Capitol Disc Interactive	Philips Interactive Media	1996	No	Yes		Required
Crime Patrol 2: Drug Wars	Capitol Disc Interactive	Philips Interactive Media	1996	No	Yes		Required
Cyber Soldier Sharaku	Japan Interactive Media	Japan Interactive Media	1993				Required
Dark Castle	PIMA	Philips Interactive Media	1991				
The Dark Fables of Aesop	Philips Sidewalk Studio	Philips Interactive Media	1992				
De Zaak Van Sam	NOB Interactive	Haarlems Uitgeef Bedrijf	1997				Required
Defender of the Crown	Philips Interactive Media	Philips Interactive Media	1991				
Die CD-i mit der Maus – Auf dem Bauernhof	Club d’Investissement Média	T1 New Media	1995				
Dimo's Quest	SPC Vision	Philips Interactive Media	1994	Yes	No		
Do you remember the ’60s?	3T Productions	Philips Media	1996	No	Yes		
Domino	Wigant	Haarlems	1997				
Dragon's Lair	Superclub/ICDI	Philips Interactive Media	1994				Required
Dragon's Lair II: Time Warp	Superclub/INTL	Philips Interactive Media	1994				Required
Earth Command	Visionary Media	Philips Interactive Media	1994				
Effacer: Hangman from the 25th Century	Capitol Disc Interactive	Philips Interactive Media	1994				Required
Escape from Cyber City (Freedom Fighter)	Fathom Pictures	Philips Interactive Media	1992				
European Party	Giunti Multimedia	Philips Interactive Media	1994				
Family Games	DIMA	Philips Interactive Media	1995			2 simultaneous players	
Family Games II Junk Food Jive	DIMA	Philips Interactive Media	1995			1-4 players (2 simultaneous players with “2-player Edition”)	
Flashback: The Quest for Identity	Tiertex Ltd	Philips Interactive Media	1995	Yes	Yes		
Flintstones & Jetsons: Timewarp	R/GA Interactive	Philips Interactive Media	1994				
Foqus	Bildgarden	Philips Interactive Media	1994				
Girl's Club	Philips POV	Philips Interactive Media	1992				
Go	Capitol Disc Interactive	Philips Interactive Media	1992			1-2 players	
Goal!	IContact	Philips Interactive Media	1993			1-2 players	
Golden Oldies 1: Guardian and Invaders	The Vision Factory	SPC Vision	1997				
Golden Oldies 2: Blockbuster and Bughunt	The Vision Factory	SPC Vision	1997				
Golf Tips	Xdra	Philips Interactive Media	1994				
Golgo 13	Japan Interactive Media	Japan Interactive Media	1992				
Great British Golf		Philips Interactive Media	1992				
A Great Day at the Races	CD-I Racing, Dove Films, Total Vision	Philips Interactive Media	1993	Yes	No	1-6 players	
Hieperdepiep, Ik Lees!	SPC Vision	Philips Interactive Media	1996				
Hieroglyph	Circle Multimedia Development GMBH	ZYX Music Multi	1994				
Hotel Mario	Philips Fantasy Factory	Philips Interactive Media	1994			1-2 players	
Ik, mik, Letterland	Lost Boys Interactive	Philips Interactive Media	1996				
Il Tesoro dell’Isola dei Giochi	Clementoni	Philips Interactive Media	1994				
Inca	Coktel Vision	Philips Interactive Media	1993				
International Tennis Open	Infogrames Multimedia	Philips Interactive Média France; Pathé Interactive	1993		Yes	2 simultaneous players with “2-player Edition”	
Jan Pieńkowski Haunted House	Media Station	Philips Interactive Media	1997				
Jeopardy!	Philips Interactive Media	Philips Interactive Media	1994	Yes	No	1-2 players	
Jezus Messias	Zoutewelle Multimedia	Zoutewelle Multimedia	1997				
Jigsaw: The Ultimate Electronic Puzzle	NovaLogic	Philips Interactive Media	1991				
The Joker's Wild!	Accent Media Productions	Philips Interactive Media	1993	Yes	No	1-4 players	
The Joker's Wild Jr.	Accent Media Productions	Philips Interactive Media	1994	Yes	No	1-4 players	
Kether	Infogrames	Philips Interactive Media	1993				
Kingdom II: Shadoan	Capitol Disc Interactive	Philips Interactive Media	1996				Required
Kingdom: The Far Reaches	Capitol Disc Interactive	Philips Interactive Media	1994				Required
L’Albero Azzuro	RAI Televisione Italiana	Philips Interactive Media	1994				
La Famille Papyrus	Hachette Multimedia	Hachette Livre	1995				
La Machine à Remonter le temps	Bayard Presse	Philips Interactive Media	1994				
Labyrinth Of Crete	Funhouse	Philips Interactive Media	1994				Required
Laser Lords	Spinnaker Software	Philips Interactive Media	1992				
The Last Bounty Hunter	American Laser Games	Philips Interactive Media	1996	No	Yes		Required
Le Journal Interactif 94 TF1	TF1 Entreprises	Philips Interactive Média France	1994		Yes		
Le Journal Interactif 95 TF1	TF1 Entreprises	Philips Interactive Média France	1995		Yes		
Learn With Sooty - Start to Read	Thames International	Philips Interactive Media	1994				
Lemmings	DMA	Philips Interactive Media	1994				
Les Guignols de l’Info	ICDI	Philips Interactive Média France	1996		Yes		Required
Lettergreep	Wigant Interactive	Philips Interactive Media	1996				
Lingo	SPC Vision	Philips Interactive Media	1994	No	Netherlands only	1-2 players	
Link: The Faces of Evil	Animation Magic	Philips Interactive Media	1993				
Litil Divil	Gremlin Ireland	Philips Interactive Media	1994				Required
Little Monster at School	Broderbund	Philips Interactive Media	1993				
Lords of the Rising Sun	Philips POV	Philips Interactive Media	1992				
Lost Eden	Virgin Interactive	Philips Interactive Media	1995				Required
The Lost Ride	Formula	Philips Interactive Media	1998		Yes		Required
Lucky Luke: The Video Game	The Vision Factory	Philips Interactive Media	1996				Required
Mad Dog II: The Lost Gold	Capitol Disc Interactive	Philips Interactive Media	1995				Required
Mad Dog McCree	Capitol Disc Interactive	Philips Interactive Media	1994	Yes			Required
Magic Eraser	Circle Multimedia Development	ZYX Music	1995		Yes		
Mah-Jong	Japan Interactive Media	Japan Interactive Media	1994				
Making the Grade	3T Productions	3T Productions	1995				
Marco Polo	Infogrames Multimedia	Philips Interactive Média France	1994			1-4 players	
Master Labyrinth	AVM	Philips Interactive Media	1994				Optional
Max Magic	PF.Magic	Philips Interactive Media	1994				
Mega-Maze	PolyMedia Communications	Philips Interactive Media	1993				
Merlin's Apprentice	FunHouse	Philips Interactive Media	1995				
Micro Machines (video game)	Codemasters	Philips Interactive Media	1995			2 simultaneous players	
Monty Python's Invasion From The Planet Skyron	Daedalus	Philips Interactive Media	1995				Required
More Dark Fables from Aesop	Philips Interactive Media	Philips Interactive Media	1992				
Mother Goose – Hidden Pictures	Philips Interactive Media	Philips Interactive Media	1991				
Mother Goose – Rhymes to Colour	Philips Interactive Media	Philips Interactive Media	1991				
Mutant Rampage: BodySlam	Animation Magic	Philips Interactive Media	1994				Required
Muzzy	Vektor	Philips Interactive Media	1994				
Myst	Ledge Multimedia	Philips Interactive Media	1996				
Mystic Midway: Phantom Express	Philips POV	Philips Interactive Media	1993				
Mystic Midway: Rest in Pieces	Philips POV	Philips Interactive Media	1992				
Naftaline Chez Elle	CSM Productions	Philips Interactive Media	1996				
Naftaline et ses Amis	CSM Productions	Philips Interactive Media	1996				
Name That Tune	Philips Fantasy Factory	Philips Interactive Media	1993			1-4 players	
Nationale Spellingwedstrijd	Bortiboll Communications, DIMA	Philips Media Benelux	1995			1-2 players	
NFL – Football Trivia Challenge	Capdisc	Philips Interactive Media	1993				
NFL Football Trivia Challenge ('94 - '95 Edition)	Capitol Disc Interactive	Philips Interactive Media	1993				
NFL Hall of Fame Football	Philips Interactive Media	Philips Interactive Media	1994			1-2 players	Required
NFL Instant Replay	Philips Interactive Media	Philips Interactive Media	1995			2 simultaneous players	Required
Othello	Codim Interactive	Philips Interactive Media	1993			1-2 players	
P.A.W.S.	Domestic Funk Productions	Philips Interactive Media	1998				
The Palm Springs Open	Fathom Pictures	Philips Interactive Media	1991			1-4 players	
Pac-Panic	Namco	Philips Interactive Media	1995	No	Yes	2 simultaneous players	
Pecos Bill	Rabbit Ears Productions	Philips Interactive Media	1991				
Pinball	Capitol Disc Interactive	Philips Interactive Media	1991			1-6 players	
Power Hitter	Fathom Pictures	Philips Interactive Media	1992			1-2 players	
Pyramid Adventures	Compact Disk Incorporated	Philips Interactive Media	1993				
QuizMania	Giunti Multimedia	Philips Interactive Media	1993				
Richard Scarry’s Best Neighborhood Disc Ever	Philips Sidewalk Studio	Philips Interactive Media	1991				
Richard Scarry’s Busiest Neighborhood Disc Ever	Philips Sidewalk Studio	Philips Interactive Media	1991				
Rise of the Robots	MIRAGE Technologies	Philips Interactive Media	1995			2 simultaneous players	Optional
Rollerball	Topilot	Philips Interactive Media	1998				
Sandy's Circus Adventure	Philips Sidewalk Studio	Philips Interactive Media	1991				
Santa Claus’ Mice	Rabbit Ears Productions	Philips Interactive Media	1992				
Sargon Chess	Spinnaker Software	American Interactive Media	1991			1-2 players	
Les Schtroumpfs: Le Téléportaschtroumpf	Infogrames Multimedia	Infogrames Multimedia	1995			1-4 players	
Scotland Yard Interactive	Audio Visuellen	Philips Interactive Media	1993			1-6 players	
Secret Mission	Microïds	Philips Interactive Media	1996				
Shaolin's Road	Infogrames	Philips Interactive Média France	1995				
Shipwreck	The Epic Interactive Media Company & Two-Can Publishing	Philips Interactive Media	1993				
Solar Crusade	Infogrames Multimedia	Infogrames Multimedia	1999			2 simultaneous players	Required
Space Ace	Super Club/ICDI	Philips Interactive Media	1993				Required
Space Safari & The Number Factory	BEPL	Philips Interactive Media	1992				
Sport Freaks	SPC Vision	Philips Interactive Media	1996				
Steel Machine	SPC Vision	Philips Interactive Media	1993				
Stickybear – Family Fun	Optimum Resource, Inc.	Philips Interactive Media	1995				
Stickybear – Math	Optimum Resource, Inc.	Philips Interactive Media	1994				
Stickybear – Preschool	Optimum Resource, Inc.	Philips Interactive Media	1994				
Stickybear – Reading	Optimum Resource, Inc.	Philips Interactive Media	1992				
Striker Pro	Rage Software	American Interactive Media	1994	Yes	Yes	2 simultaneous players	
Strip Poker Live	GreenPig Production	Philips Interactive Media	1994				Optional
Strip Poker Pro	Hot Stage	Interactive Pictures Software	1994				
Super Test	Giunti Multimedia	Philips Interactive Media	1994				
Surf City	Philips Interactive Media	Philips Interactive Media	1994				
Tangram	Eagle Vision	Philips Interactive Media	1992				
Tell Me Why I	Interactive Production Associates	Philips Interactive Media	1991				
Tell Me Why II	Interactive Production Associates	Philips Interactive Media	1991				
Tetris	Philips POV	Philips Interactive Media	1992			1-2 players	
Tetsuo Gaiden	Philips POV	Philips Interactive Media	1997			1-2 players	Required
Text Tiles	Capitol Disc Interactive	Philips Interactive Media	1992			1-4 players	
The Ultimate Noah's Ark	Philips Interactive Media	Philips Interactive Media	1994				
A Visit to Sesame Street: Letters	Children's Television Workshop	Philips Interactive Media	1991				
A Visit to Sesame Street: Numbers	Children's Television Workshop	Philips Interactive Media	1991				
Thunder in Paradise	Schwartz Bonnan Productions	Philips Interactive Media	1995				Required
Tim & Bear at the Airport	Valkieser Multi Media	Philips Interactive Media	1994				
Tim & Bear at the Harbour	Valkieser Multi Media	Philips Interactive Media	1995				
Tim & Bear at the Hospital	Valkieser Multi Media	Philips Interactive Media	1995				
Tim & Bear at the Movies	Valkieser Multi Media	Philips Interactive Media	1995				
Ultra CDi Soccer	Krisalis Productions	Philips Interactive Media	1997			2 simultaneous players	Required
Uncover: Featuring Tatjana	SPC Vision	Philips Interactive Media	1996				Required
Urban Murderfiles - Episode 1: New York City	Omnibell	Philips Interactive Media	1995				
USGA Presents Great American Golf 1	XDRA	XDRA	1993				
USGA Presents Great American Golf 2	XDRA	XDRA	1994				
Vegas Girls	Status	Philips Interactive Media	1995				
Video Speedway	ISG Productions	Philips Interactive Media	1992			1-4 players	
Voetbal	Hypervision	Philips Media	1994	No	Netherlands Only		
Voyeur	Philips POV	Philips Interactive Media	1993				
Whack A Bubble	Creative Multi	New Frontier	1997			2 simultaneous players	
Who Shot Johnny Rock?	Capitol Disc Interactive	Philips Interactive Media	1995	Yes			Required
Wimbledon Challenge	XDRA	XDRA	1995				
Wordplay	Backs	Philips Interactive Media	1994			1-4 players	
World Cup Golf	US Gold	Philips Interactive Media	1996				Required
Xplora1: Peter Gabriel's Secret World	Real World Media	Philips Interactive Media	1995				Required
Yearn 2 Learn – Peanuts	Image Smith	Philips Interactive Media	1995				
Zelda: The Wand of Gamelon	Animation Magic	Philips Interactive Media	1993				
Zelda's Adventure	Viridis Corporation	Philips Interactive Media	1994	No	Netherlands only		
Zeneca – Quaeritur III	Binary Vision Production	Zeneca	1995				
Zenith	Radarsoft	Philips Interactive Media	1997			1-4 players	
Zombie Dinos From Planet Zeltoid	Philips POV	Philips Interactive Media	1992				

== Multimedia ==
Title	Developer	Publisher	Release date	U.S. release	EU release	Multi-player support	Digital Video Card status
1995: All the News and Views	Lost Boys	Philips Interactive Media	1993	No	Yes		
A Child Is Born	Electronic Sound and Pictures Limited	Philips Interactive Media	1993	No	Yes		
A Visit to Sesame Street – Letters	Children’s Television Workshop	Philips Interactive Media	1991				
A Visit to Sesame Street – Numbers	Children’s Television Workshop	Philips Interactive Media	1991				
Beauty and the Beast	Lightyear Entertainment	Philips Interactive Media	1992				
Brer Rabbit and the Wonderful Tar Baby	Philips Interactive Media	Philips Interactive Media	1992				
Cartoon Jukebox	AIM Kidscape Group	Philips Interactive Media	1991				
Children’s Musical Theatre	Sonic Images Productions Inc.	Philips Interactive Media	1990				
Classical Jukebox	American Interactive Media	Philips Interactive Media	1991				
Compton's Interactive Encyclopedia	Compton's NewMedia	Philips Interactive Media	1992				
Cool Oldies Jukebox	American Interactive Media	Philips Interactive Media	1991				
Dutch Masters of the Seventeenth Century	Philips ArtSpace	Philips Interactive Media	1992				
The Emperor’s New Clothes	Philips Interactive Media	Philips Interactive Media	1992				
Face Kitchen	Freeland Studios	Philips Interactive Media	1992				
The Flowers of Robert Mapplethorpe	Philips Infovision	Philips Interactive Media	1992				
Gewetensvragen	Harlon Corporate Communicatie	Nationaal Oorlogs en Verzetsmuseum	1995				
Girls	ITAC	Philips Media	1993				
Golden Oldies Jukebox	American Interactive Media	Philips Interactive Media	1991				
Het Land van Ooit	Valkieser	Philips Interactive Media	1995				
How do You do?	Philips Media Benelux B.V.	Philips Interactive Media	1994				
How The Camel Got His Hump	Rabbit Ears Productions	Philips Interactive Media	1991				
How the Rhinoceros Got His Skin	Rabbit Ears Productions	Philips Interactive Media	1991				
Interlight’s Children’s Bible Stories – David and Goliath	Interlight Productions	Philips Interactive Media	1992				
Interlight’s Children’s Bible Stories – Moses: Bound for the Promised Land	Interlight Productions	Philips Interactive Media	1992				
Interlight’s Children’s Bible Stories – Moses: The Exodus	Interlight Productions	Philips Interactive Media	1992				
Interlight’s Children’s Bible Stories – Noah’s Ark	Interlight Productions	Philips Interactive Media	1992				
Interlight’s Children’s Bible Stories – The Story of Jonah	Interlight Productions	Philips Interactive Media	1992				
Interlight’s Children’s Bible Stories – The Story of Samson	Interlight Productions	Philips Interactive Media	1992				
The Joy of Sex		Philips Interactive Media	1993				
Karaoke Klassics Family Favourites	Xdra	Philips Interactive Media	1993				
Les Souris du Père Noël	La Fabrique/EVA	Philips Interactive Media	1992				
Little Monster at School	Broderbund	Philips Interactive Media	1993				
No World Order	Alchemedia Productions	Philips Interactive Media	1993				
O Sole Mio Pavarotti	American Interactive Media	Philips Interactive Media	1991				
Paint School I	Spinnaker Software	Philips Interactive Media	1991				
Paint School II	Spinnaker Software	Philips Interactive Media	1997				
Pegasus	Lightyear Entertainment	Philips Interactive Media	1992				
Playboy's Complete Massage	Interlance Publishing	Philips Interactive Media	1993	Yes	Yes		
Private Lesson Series: Classical Guitar	Sonic Images Productions	Philips Interactive Media	1992				
Private Lesson Series: Jazz Guitar	Sonic Images Productions	Philips Interactive Media	1992				
The Renaissance of Florence	Philips ArtSpace	Philips Interactive Media	1991				
Retourtje Mali	NIAM	Museon	1996				
Routes to Reading	New Media	Philips Interactive Media	1995				
The Rules of Golf	Telecity CD-i N.V. Belgium	Telecity CD-i N.V. Belgium	1991				
Shark Alert	CapDisc	Philips Interactive Media	1993				
Soundtrap	Epic Interactive Media	Philips Interactive Media	1993				
Story Machine – Magic Tales	Spinnaker Software	Philips Interactive Media	1991				
Story Machine – Star Dreams	Spinnaker Software	Philips Interactive Media	1991				
Thumbelina	Spice Multimedia	Philips Interactive Media	1995				
Time-Life Presents 35mm Photography	American Interactive Media	Philips Interactive Media	1991				
Tom – Magic Picture Show	Hatier	Philips Interactive Media	1991				
Treasures of the Smithsonian	Smithsonian Institution	Philips Interactive Media	1991				
Weather Kitchen	McGill Multimedia Inc	Rainbow Raster Graphics, Inc.	1995				

== Unreleased ==
Title	Developer	Publisher	Release date	U.S. release	EU release	Multi-player support	Digital Video Card status
Connaone	RasterSoft	Maelstrom Publishing	Cancelled				
Inca II	Vision Games	Philips Interactive Media	Cancelled				
Joe Guard	DIMA	RetroGameLab	Cancelled				
Microcosm	Psygnosis		Cancelled				
Mind Quest		Philips Interactive Media	Cancelled				
Super Fighter	Super Fighter Team		Cancelled				
Super Mario's Wacky Worlds	NovaLogic	Philips Interactive Media	Cancelled				
Urban Murderfiles - Episode 2: New Jersey	Omnibell		Cancelled				
Voyeur II	Philips POV	RetroGameLab	Cancelled				
Wacky World of Miniature Golf	Philips Sidewalk Studio	Philips Interactive Media	Cancelled				

== Later Releases ==
Title	Developer	Publisher	Release date	U.S. release	EU release	Multi-player support	Digital Video Card status
The New Grolier Electronic Encyclopedia	Digimail	World Of Games	2024	Yes	No	No	Required
Origami: Doll's House	Eaglevision Interactive productions b.v.	World Of Games	2024	Yes	No	No	No
Klik	Editions Renyi Inc and Sidac s.p.a	World Of Games	2023	Yes	No	No	No
Treasures Of Oz	Family Entertainment	World Of Games	2023	Yes	No	No	No
Felix The Cat's Giant Electronic Comic Book	EMG Learning	World Of Games	2022	Yes	No	No	No
Nobelia	TwBurn	TwBurn	2022				
Frog Feast	RasterSoft	OlderGames	2007				
Go - Special Edition	Capitol Disc Interactive	OlderGames	2002			1-2 players	
Jack Sprite Vs The Crimson Ghost (2002)	PF.Magic	OlderGames	2002				
Plunderball	ISG Productions	OlderGames	2002				
Space Ranger	Studio Interactive	OlderGames	2002				
