= Emmanuelle (video game) =

1989 video game

- The cover of the PC version
- Developers: Coktel Vision; Tomahawk
- Publisher: Coktel Vision
- Director: Muriel Tramis
- Designer: Muriel Tramis
- Composer: François Peirano
- Platforms: Amiga, Atari ST, MS-DOS
- Release: 1989
- Genre: Adventure
- Mode: Single-player

Emmanuelle is an erotic graphical adventure game from Coktel Vision, originally released in 1989 for Amiga, Atari ST, and MS-DOS. The game was developed by Muriel Tramis (better known from her games in the Gobliiins series, Fascination & Lost in Time), and is loosely inspired by Emmanuelle Arsan's Emmanuelle series of novels.

== Story ==
The character Emmanuelle in the game is the wife of a French businessman whose job requires constant travelling, thus leaving Emmanuelle unfulfilled. Emmanuelle has taken a lover, Marc, but later suffers pangs of conscience, because she still loves her husband. Emmanuelle travels to Rio de Janeiro in Brazil to escape him, but is followed by Marc. The aim of the game is to augment Marc's erotic potential so he can seduce Emmanuelle again.

The player's "erotic potential" is increased by following the three laws of eroticism: law of numbers (seduce as many ladies as you can), law of asymmetry (try to seduce an odd number of ladies) and a law of surprise (seduce preferably concealed/masked ladies). Furthermore, the player should find three erotic statuettes. The game involves no hardcore scenes, though the Marc persona might catch Emmanuelle disrobing by looking through a certain keyhole. More often, however, Marc sees only an old gentleman who is engaged in washing his feet.

== Gameplay ==
The DOS version supports EGA, CGA and monochrome graphics, while the Amiga and Atari ST versions uses 16 colours. Emmanuelle is a point-and-click adventure, but the DOS version has no mouse support. The game uses multiple-choice dialogues for conversations. The game includes sub-games such as gambling at a casino where the player has to raise money for flight tickets. The player might also end up fighting with angry husbands and smugglers due to their exploits.

== Reception ==
The reviewer of ST-Computer praised the game's graphics, but criticized the lack of sounds and the ease of the puzzles. The PC Power Play review said that the game was boring and only titillating in the casino sequences; it also criticized the poor graphics and the lack of sound. A later issue PC Power Play gave Emmanuelle an "award", as the game with the most idiotic dialogue.
