= Apprentice (disambiguation) =

An apprentice is someone who is in training for a trade, profession.

The Apprentice or Apprentice may also refer to:

== Television ==
- The Apprentice (American TV series), the original reality television series
- The Apprentice (franchise), a global reality TV series franchise including a list of local, regional and global titles in the franchise
- "The Apprentice", an episode of the series The Paper Chase
- "The Apprentice" (Xiaolin Showdown), an episode of the animated series Xiaolin Showdown
- "The Apprentice" (The Mighty B! episode), an episode of the animated children's series The Mighty B!
- "The Apprentice" (The Amazing World of Gumball), an episode of the animated series The Amazing World of Gumball
- "The Apprentice" (Once Upon a Time), an episode of the series Once Upon a Time

== Films ==
- Apprentice (film), a 2016 Singaporean drama
- The Apprentice (1971 film) or Fleur bleue, a Quebec-made film starring Susan Sarandon
- The Apprentice (1991 film) (French: L'Apprenti), an animated short by Richard Condie
- The Apprentice (2008 film), a docudrama film by Samuel Collardey
- The Apprentice (2024 film), a biographical film about Donald Trump
- The Apprentices, a 1995 French comedy film directed by Pierre Salvadori
- "The Apprentice", a deleted segment of the anthology film Movie 43

== Literature ==
- The Apprentice (play), a 1756 play by the Irish dramatist Arthur Murphy
- The Apprentice (Libby novel), a 1996 novel by Scooter Libby
- The Apprentice (Gerritsen novel), a 2002 novel by Tess Gerritsen
- The Apprentice: My Life in the Kitchen, a book by Jacques Pépin
- Apprentice Adept, a heptalogy (1980 to 1990) of fantasy and science fiction novels by Piers Anthony

== Music ==
- Apprentice (In a Musical Workshop), a 1974 album by Dave Loggins
- The Apprentice (album), a 1990 album by John Martyn
- "The Apprentice", a song by Australian comedian Kevin Bloody Wilson
- "The Apprentice", a song on the 2017 album Humanz by Gorillaz

== Video games ==
- Apprentice (video game), a series of amateur adventure games
- Apprentice (Magic: The Gathering software), a program that facilitates the play of Magic: The Gathering online, with database capabilities
- Starkiller, a character in Star Wars: The Force Unleashed known in-universe as "The Apprentice"
- The Apprentice (video game), a 1994 game for the Philips CD-i

== Education ==
- Apprenticeship degree, in the United States
- Degree apprenticeship, in the United Kingdom

== See also ==
- Young Apprentice, a British reality television programme, a spin off of The Apprentice
