= Lost in Time =

Lost in Time may refer to:

== Film, television, and video games ==
- Lost in Time (video game), a 1993 video game
- Bugs Bunny: Lost in Time, a 1999 video game
- Lost in Time (2003 film), a Hong Kong film
- Lost in Time (2019 film), a Kenyan film
- Lost in Time (Doctor Who), a 2004 Doctor Who DVD set
- "Lost in Time" (The Sarah Jane Adventures), a 2010 The Sarah Jane Adventures episode
- "Lost in Time" (Lego Ninjago: Masters of Spinjitzu), a 2017 Lego Ninjago: Masters of Spinjitzu episode
- "Dunces and Dragons", alternate title "Lost in Time", episode of SpongeBob SquarePants

== Music ==
- Lost in Time (Akino album), 2007
- Lost in Time (Eric Benét album), 2010
- Lost in Time, a 2012 album by Khuli Chana
- Lost in Time – The Early Years of Nocturnal Rites, a 2005 compilation double album by Nocturnal Rites
