= Gone Fishing =

Gone Fishing or Gone Fishin' may refer to:

== Film and TV ==
- Gone Fishin' (film), a 1997 American comedy
- Gone Fishing (2008 film), a short film by Chris Jones
- Gone Fishing (2012 film), an Argentine film
- "Gone Fishing!", an episode of Barney & Friends
- "Gone Fishin'", an episode of Alvin and the Chipmunks
- Mortimer & Whitehouse: Gone Fishing, a BBC television series starring Bob Mortimer and Paul Whitehouse

== Other ==
- Gone Fishin' (video game), a 1994 computer game
- Gone Fishin', a 1997 Easy Rawlins mystery novel by Walter Mosley
- Gone Fishin', a music duo consisting of Tim Lee and Matt Piucci, who recorded the 1986 album Can't Get Lost When You're Goin' Nowhere

== Albums ==
- Gone Fishin' (Flipper album), 1984
- Gone Fishing (album), a 2009 mixtape by The Cool Kids

== Songs ==
- "Gone Fishin'" (song), a 1951 song written by Nick and Charles Kenny, popularized by Louis Armstrong and Bing Crosby
- "Gone Fishing" (Second Person song), a 2007 song by Second Person
- "Gone Fishing", a 1991 song by Chris Rea from Auberge
- "Gone Fishing", a 2015 song by Róisín Murphy from Hairless Toys
- "Gone Fishing", a Thomas & Friends song
