= Chaos Control =

Chaos Control may refer to:

- Chaos Control (video game), a 1995 video game
- The ability possessed by certain characters in Sonic the Hedgehog
- Control of chaos, a technique used in chaos theory

== See also ==
- KAOS and CONTROL, spy agencies from Get Smart
