= Muriel Tramis =

French video game designer

- Born: 1958 (age 67–68)
- Occupations: Video game designer, writer
- Known for: Adventure games

Muriel Tramis (born in 1958) is a French video game designer from Martinique. She is known as the first Black woman video game designer. She has written and directed the adventure games Méwilo, Freedom: Rebels in the Darkness, Geisha, Fascination, Lost in Time, and Urban Runner at Coktel Vision. She also co-created the Gobliiins series with Pierre Gilhodes. Tramis was involved in the creation of the ADI range for schoolchildren and college students, and since 2003 has managed Avantilles, a specialist in real-time 3D applications for the web.

== Early life and education ==
Tramis was born in 1958 in Fort-de-France, Martinique where she attended school at the convent of the Sisters of St. Joseph of Cluny and then at the Seminary College. She moved to Paris to pursue a generalist and polyvalent engineering training at ISEP (Institut supérieur d'électronique de Paris).

== Career ==
Before becoming a French video game creator, she was a computer engineer. Tramis soon began five years at Aérospatiale, where she was responsible for optimizing maintenance procedures for unmanned aerial vehicles (UAVs) in addition to handling remotely piloted aircraft used in missile fire tests and anti-ship missiles. After leaving Aérospatiale, she began to explore marketing and communication, alongside interactive programs.

In 1986, Tramis joined Coktel Vision, a French video game design and publishing company, leaving in 2003. She describes her time with this company as very satisfying both intellectually and creatively. She helped Coktel Vision develop some of their most well-known and best-selling games.

In 1991 Gobliiins sold almost 1.5 million copies in collaboration with Coktel vision. Another one of her most popular games was Lost in Time, an adventure game developed and published by Coktel Vision in 1993. It was promoted as being "The first Interactive Adventure Film using Full Motion Video Technology" and contained four graphical elements, namely full motion video, hand painted and digitized backgrounds and 3D decor. The plot was based upon a woman exploring a shipwreck which has mysteriously been transported back in time to 1840. The ship was still intact so she had no choice but to explore it. This leads to revelations about her past. Tramis quickly became interested in creating stories and images with computers and collaborated with Coktel to create her first adventure game. The result was Méwilo, in collaboration with Patrick Chamoiseau and Philippe Truca. The plot takes place in Saint-Pierre on May 7, 1902, around the time of the 1902 eruption of Mount Pelée.

Building on the success of Méwilo, Tramis directed Freedom, about a slave who has one night to escape from a plantation. The game combines adventure and strategy: persuasion and alliances are combined with tactical phases of confrontation involving bare hands or cutlasses. Tramis was soon promoted by Coktel Vision to manage several projects. After that, she returned to directing games with titles such as Geisha, Fascination and Lost in Time. With Pierre Gilhodes, she also created the three episodes of the series Gobliiins, and The Bizarre Adventures of Woodruff and the Schnibble. She later directed Urban Runner, collaborating with a film crew and overseeing digital editing and the creation of special effects. Tramis was involved in the creation of the ADI range for schoolchildren and college students, and since 2003 has created and managed Avantilles, a specialist in real-time 3D applications for the web.

She helped create The Bizarre Adventures of Woodruff and the Schnibble in 1994 which is set after the near-annihilation of human life on Earth during a final atomic war. The surviving human population sheltered at the centre of the planet where the last traces of life-sustaining warmth remained. Awaiting a reduction in surface radiation, centuries passed before the humans finally ventured back into the world above. They then discovered the planet has sprouted a beautiful, overgrown jungle in their absence along with new races of living creatures. These included a peaceful, rabbit-like race known as the Bouzouk, differing from humans by their tails, pointed ears, and extraordinarily long noses. Bouzouk society is ruled by a King, a Council of Wisemen, and seven mystics who have maintained universal harmony by guarding the Chprotznog, a sacred containment unit used to channel and trap evil spirits. Having failed to learn their lesson, the humans waged war on the Bouzouk tribe. In one day, the humans destroyed the Bouzouk civilization, hurting many innocent civilians and looting their holy artefacts. The surviving Bouzouks were enslaved and forced to construct a new society for the humans.

Tramis has also designed multiple childhood educational and adventure games including, Adibou 1 and Adibou 2 (1996). These are learning games designed to introduce young children to number, shapes, and colors.

Tramis has also been a major voice in the French gaming community as she has maintained that women in the industry were not respected enough. She has also pointed out the lack of women employees and that increasing recruitment and training among women would be an obvious way to overcome the European shortage of designers, engineers and technicians.

== Distinctions ==
Muriel Tramis was appointed a Knight of the Legion of Honour on July 14, 2018. The distinction was awarded to her at the opening of Paris Games Week by Mounir Mahjoubi, then French Secretary of State for Digital Affairs, on October 25, 2018. She is the first woman and second game designer to receive this distinction.

== Games ==
- Méwilo (1987)
- Freedom: Rebels in the Darkness (1988)
- Emmanuelle (1989)
- Geisha (1990)
- Fascination (1991)
- Lost in Time (1993)
- Urban Runner (1996)

Co-created with Pierre Gilhodes:

- Gobliiins (1991)
- Gobliins 2 (1992)
- Goblins Quest (1993)
- The Bizarre Adventures of Woodruff and the Schnibble (1994)

== See also ==
- List of women in the video game industry
