= Phantom Express =

Phantom Express may refer to:

- Boeing XS-1 Phantom Express (2017), cancelled experimental highly reusable spaceplane
- The Phantom Express (1932 film), U.S. mystery crime drama
- The Phantom Express (1925 film), U.S. silent crime film
- The Phantom Express (1942 radio episode), season 2 number 6 episode 58 of Inner Sanctum, see List of Inner Sanctum episodes
- The Phantom Express (2013 TV episode), season 17 number 13 episode 401 of Thomas & Friends, see List of Thomas & Friends episodes
- Mystic Midway: Phantom Express (1993 videogame), sequel to the 1992 video game Mystic Midway: Rest in Pieces, see List of CD-i games
- "Phantom Express" (amusement park ride) a 2015 amusement park attraction in Margate, Kent, England, UK; at Dreamland Margate

== See also ==
- Phantom (disambiguation)
- Express (disambiguation)
