= Project Space Station =

1985 video game

- Developer: HESware
- Publisher: HESware
- Designer: Lawrence Holland
- Platforms: Commodore 64, Apple II, MS-DOS
- Release: 1985
- Genre: Simulation
- Mode: Single-player

Project Space Station is a simulation video game developed for the Commodore 64 by Lawrence Holland and published in 1985 by HESware. Conversions for the Apple II and MS-DOS were released in 1987.

== Gameplay ==
The game puts the player in control of the National Aeronautics and Space Administration (NASA) and tasks them with building and maintaining a space station while also generating enough money with commercial contracts to make up for an anemic yearly budget. This can be seen as a discrete set of phases, except that they all proceed simultaneously. The exception is at the beginning of the game where the player has unlimited time in the planning phase before the game clock starts.

In the planning phase, the player first allocates the funds they have to various budget items, like crew selection, station modules, and research and development. Then they choose their crew, who have intrinsic task sets (like piloting and physics), and varying levels of competence and compatibility with other potential employees. From there the player purchases equipment like space suits and satellites, and station modules like laboratories and solar arrays. Then they schedule their launches using the two Space Shuttles available (Atlantis and Discovery, though the initial release used the Space Shuttle Challenger), and have their budget approved. In the final stage of the planning phase the player can create a simulated station with an unlimited number of parts, and without dealing with the later constrictions of the EVA.

The launch phase has the player decide whether launch conditions are stable enough to merit launch. If they give the implicit go-ahead, they engage in a light arcade sequence where the player attempts to keep the shuttle on course throughout its orbital burn. The more successful the player is, the closer the shuttle will be to the station.

Once the shuttle is in orbit, the player is tasked with assembling the components they brought up (or firing off any satellites they have contracts for) in the Extra-Vehicular Activity or EVA phase. Here the player directly controls an Orbital Construction Pod, a small ship with mechanical arms that an astronaut can use to move large equipment. Being careless here could have consequences as the pod or equipment may become damaged, and it may run out of fuel and become stranded until another pod can rescue it. Consequences are not limited to equipment damage: stranded astronauts in pods can die if oxygen runs out. Other crew hazards include solar flares, which can kill astronauts on the station or shuttle if precautions (using an emergency module in station design) were not taken. Crew died in reverse alphabetical order from solar flares.

The player then transfers crew to and from the space station and assigns them to research tasks. Completing these tasks awards the player with government contracts that supplement NASA's budget. A math bug (or intentional cheat) in the game allows an infinite supply of money, if the player allocated more than $10,000K to any budget. For example, if $800k is spent, the budget is recalculated to $19,200K instead of $9,200, as expected.

Finally the player lands the shuttle. After determining that landing conditions are adequate, the player again keeps the shuttle on course as it turns from the station and enters its descent. Skill here determines how close the shuttle will be to the optimal point from the runway. After this the player controls the shuttle with a simple landing simulator viewed from the side. The more abrupt or overshot the landing, the more damage will be done to the shuttle and the longer it will need to be repaired before it can venture out on another mission.

The game is played using a menu system. Every option can be queried for in-game help, and every major task has a tutorial that simulates that task without the consequences of failure, and sometimes with additional assistance (like being able to pause a landing attempt). Another major feature is the message system that alerts the player when there are changes to mission status, wherever the player might be within the menu system.

== Reception ==
Info rated Project Space Station five stars out of five, describing it as "probably one of the most ambitious programs ever developed for the Commodore 64 ... a fun, complex simulation".

Computer Entertainer rated the Apple II and IBM PC versions with two and a half / three stars.

== See also ==
- Buzz Aldrin's Race Into Space — a US-Soviet Space Race simulator
- E.S.S. Mega
- Shuttle (video game)
- Earth Orbit Stations
