= Fighting Steel =

1999 video game

- Developer: Divide By Zero
- Publisher: Strategic Simulations
- Platform: Microsoft Windows
- Release: NA: June 23, 1999; UK: June 30, 1999
- Genre: Naval simulation
- Modes: Single-player, multiplayer

Fighting Steel is a 1999 video game by Strategic Simulations, Inc. (SSI). It depicts naval surface combat in World War II and is similar to another game by SSI, Great Naval Battles. Subsequently, SSI/DBZ granted permission to Naval Warfare Simulations to create expansions and upgrades to Fighting Steel, which were produced for free download between 2005 and 2008. The game features an in-game camera, and ability to command several ships at once. The game features an in-game camera and the ability to command several ships at once.

Main game screen; bottom displays helm functions.

Main game screen; bottom displays ship schematic.

== See also ==
Category:Naval battles and operations of World War II
