= Shuttle (video game) =

1992 video game

- Developer(s): Vektor Grafix
- Publisher(s): Virgin Games
- Platform(s): IBM PC, Amiga, Atari ST
- Release: 1992
- Genre(s): Flight simulator
- Mode(s): Single-player

Shuttle is a space flight simulator game developed by Vektor Grafix and published by Virgin Games. It was released in 1992 on the IBM PC, Amiga and Atari ST.

== Gameplay ==
In the game, the players control a Space Shuttle that departs from the Vehicle Assembly Building and returns to Earth at the Shuttle Landing Facility.

The game is organized into missions that emulate the experience of Space Shuttle missions, including launching the Hubble Space Telescope and using the Manned Maneuvering Unit to repair satellites. Players are able to receive optional guidance for completing missions if they are struggling. During the course of the game, instructions are passed to the player through a teleprinter, and when those instructions require the player to use the shuttle controls, a flashing box indicates the appropriate switch or knob to use.

The camera zooms in on the Space Shuttle launch stack (MS-DOS)

While playing, you can change your camera to point in multiple different camera angles, rather than the standard control panel and external view found in most simulators of the time, including a view that can allow the player can also look out of any of the cockpit windows, including back into the payload bay when retrieving or releasing satellites, and some of the CCTV cameras on the Remote Manipulator System. The developers also provide in-game information and diagrams on each of the major Space Shuttle systems, and the publishers also supplied a game manual and a large poster showing the control panels.

The game was released with numerous bugs and issues, particularly with the autopilot often not working as intended, leading to peculiar re-entry trajectories.

In earlier versions, the final mission was impossible to complete, due to some of these issues.

== Reception ==
Stanley Trevena from Computer Gaming World applauded the level of detail accomplished in Shuttle, and stated that "Players with an interest in space and hard-core simulation fans alike will blast off into orbit with this new simulation from Virgin." The magazine ran it in their 1992 "Simulation of the year", which ultimately went to Falcon 3.0 by Spectrum Holobyte.

In 1996, Computer Gaming World declared Shuttle the 50th-worst computer game ever released.

== See also ==
- Space Shuttle: A Journey into Space (1983)
- Project Space Station (1985)
- E.S.S. Mega (1991)
- Buzz Aldrin's Race Into Space (1993), a US-Soviet Space Race simulator
