= Méwilo =

1987 video game

Mewilo
- Developer: Coktel Vision
- Publisher: Coktel Vision
- Designer: Muriel Tramis
- Platforms: Amiga, Amstrad CPC, Atari ST, MS-DOS, Thomson TO7
- Release: November 28, 1987
- Genre: Adventure

Méwilo is a French adventure video game developed and published by Coktel Vision. It was released in 1987 for the Amstrad CPC, Thomson TO7, and MS-DOS, then in 1988 for Amiga and Atari ST.

== Development ==
It was the first game by Muriel Tramis who was designer and producer at Coktel Vision. It saw a new direction for the developer, which had previously released strategy games. Tramis "proposed to program a game that [she] thought totally original", which became Mewilo. The head of the Coktel Vision, Roland Oskian, allowed her to develop her own story, and she began work in 1986. Collaborating with Martiniquan créolité writer Patrick Chamoiseau the game was inspired by the Caribbean legend of jars of gold. It was graphic designed by Philippe Truca. The software was accompanied by a short story by Chamoiseau.

== Plot and gameplay ==
Set in the town of Saint-Pierre, Martinique on May 7, 1902, the game takes place a day before Mount Pelée is set to erupt, causing catastrophic damage. The player is a parapsychologist called into town to investigate zombie sightings.

== Release and aftermath ==
Tramis suggests that while the game was a failure in France, Mewilo performed better in Germany due to the country being "tinged with colonialism".

For the 30th anniversary, Tramis created a crowdfunding campaign to create a remake.

== Reception ==
Atari Magazine praised the "excellent graphics, which can hardly be surpassed in terms of color and richness of detail"; it also highlighted the German localisation. Joystick deemed it an "exciting and instructive adventure", highlighting themes of slavery and the social ills of the tropical plantations. Aktueller Software Markt felt it was "very complex and extensive", and praised the "thought-out story' which "included the cultural and social background of [Tramis'] home country". Additionally, the magazine wrote "Tramis understood how to create a captivating atmosphere through the interesting and realistic background of the story". Amstar Magazine thought the game was original in its subject and execution, far from the traditional adventures games containing monsters and dungeons.

Am Magazine praised its "cultural dimension" which it felt was "rarely found among its colleagues in adventure games". Generation 4 described it an "educational adventure game" and wished more games in this sub-genre would be released. Amiga News felt the software "leaves something to be desired", commenting that the "animation (for the rare times when there is some...) is sloppy and jerky". Tilt wrote it offered a "real dive into the Caribbean soul, all at the same time complex, passionate, violent and irremediably marked by the claws of its history (slavery)".

=== Awards ===
Tramis asserts that the city of Paris gave her a silver medal for the work.

== See also ==
- Freedom: Les Guerriers de l'Ombre / Freedom: Rebels in the Darkness (fr), the follow-up 1988 game by Coktel Vision.
