= The Prophecy (video game) =

1992 video game

- European cover art
- Developer(s): Coktel Vision
- Publisher(s): EU: Coktel Vision; NA: Sierra On-Line
- Designer(s): Joseph Kluytmans; Corinne Perrot
- Programmer(s): Eric Audren; Eric Thommerot; Philippe Lamarque
- Artist(s): Joseph Kluytmans; Pascal Pautrot; Rachid Chebli
- Composer(s): Charles Callet
- Platform(s): Amiga, Atari ST, MS-DOS
- Release: EU: 1992; NA: 1993 (DOS only)
- Genre(s): Adventure
- Mode(s): Single-player

The Prophecy (known in Europe as Ween: The Prophecy) is a point-and-click adventure game in a fantasy setting, developed by Coktel Vision and MDO and released in Europe in 1992 for MS-DOS, Amiga, and Atari ST. It was published by Sierra On-Line in North America in 1993. A German retail version was also released.

== Gameplay and plot ==
The game takes place in the Kingdom of Blue Rocks, where the player assumes the role of a good wizard named Ween, who is tasked to face the evil wizard Kraal. In three days' time, on the day of the Great Eclipse, Kraal plans to take over the kingdom. However, a prophecy states that, if three grains of sand are placed in the Revuss hourglass on the day of the eclipse by a brave hero, Kraal's doom would be sealed. To fulfill the prophecy in the limited time of three days, the player must go on three quests and solve various puzzles along the way to be rewarded the three grains of sand that needs to be placed in the Revuss hourglass.

Objects around the levels are detected by the cursor. Generally, the player has to solve each puzzle in sequence. Like in the company's Gobliiins series, the player character cannot die, although it is possible to fail on the last screen resulting in a game over. The game experiments with the toning of the graphics, using a faux-sepia style outside and some bright colours inside, that changes the atmosphere somewhat.

== Critical reception ==
Quandrey gave it 80%, writing that they game might turn off some players due to its restrictive movement which only frees up once players have completed a particular puzzle. Metzomagic gave it 80%, praising its "complete lack of combat" as one of the appealing aspects of the "absorbing and challenging" adventure game". CU Amiga Magazine felt the puzzles were completely illogical.

Adventure Gamers gave it 40%, commenting that for players who don't particularly enjoy inventory puzzles, the game becomes "obscure, tedious, and, well… plain unenjoyable". Tap-Repeatedly/Four Fat Chicks gave a negative review, writing "considering the fact that I play games for fun and not only was The Prophecy not very fun, it was slightly disturbing on some subconscious, almost limbic, level, I'm going to have to recommend against it in the strongest possible terms: The cornpoop".

James Trunzo reviewed The Prophecy in White Wolf #37 (July/Aug., 1993) and stated that "The Prophecy is an excellent game. While the style isn't like Sierra, the outstanding graphics, music and challenge are certainly what you would expect. The Prophecy boasts some beautifully digitized screens, fascinating humorous creatures and intricate solvable puzzles."
