= Adibou =

- Genre: Educational adventure
- Developers: Coktel Vision; Coktel SAS; Neko Entertainment
- Publishers: Coktel Vision; Knowledge Adventure; Sony Computer Entertainment Europe; Havas Interactive International; Vivendi Universal Interactive Publishing International; Vivendi Universal Games International; Mindscape; Ubisoft; Wiloki
- Platforms: PlayStation; PlayStation 2 Macintosh; Windows; Amiga; Atari ST; DOS; Wii
- First release: Adibou (English: AJ's World of Discovery); 1991
- Latest release: Adibou: La Chanson d'Adibou (English: Adiboo: The Song of Adiboo); 2022

Adibou (English: Adiboo) is an educational video gaming series first developed by Coktel Vision in the 1990s. The franchise expanded into comic books, music and television series (such as Adiboo Adventure (2009)). Titles in the series follow Adiboo, a young alien who teaches children about a variety of topics including nature, maths, and language. Most stories are set in the world of Celesta.

The series is divided into different categories based on target market: Adi for 10-14 year-olds, Adibou for 4-7 year-olds, and Adiboud'chou for 18 months-3 year-olds, and characters have different names in different regions. The name Adibou is derived from the French acronym ADI meaning Accompagnement Didacticiel Intelligent (English: Intelligent Accompaniment Tutorial). Adibou games are now supported by ScummVM's "Gob" engine.

In October 2005, Coktel Studio was sold by Vivendi Universal Games International to French publisher Mindscape which itself closed in 2011. More than a dozen titles were published until 2009 when the series went dormant.

Following the closure of Mindscape, the IP rights to Adibou were sold to Ubisoft, and in 2020, French company Wiloki, an educational start-up founded by the children of Adibou creator Roland Oskian, partnered with Ubisoft to revive the character. In May 2022, Wiloki released a brand new title titled Adibou: La Chanson d'Adibou for browser, iOS and Android under their partnership with Ubisoft.

The new version of the game is now available in French, English and German.

== Titles ==
This list is far from complete; there were dozens of titles in the series, some more documented than others.

Title	Year	Platform/s	Developer/s	Publisher/s	Details	Ref
Adibou (English: AJ's World of Discovery)	1991	Atari ST, DOS	Coktel Vision	Coktel Vision	Minigames for children including jigsaw puzzles, maths lessons, English lessons, racing, and drawing.	
Adiboo: Magical Playland	1996	Windows	Coktel Vision	Coktel Vision	Teaching lessons in reading and singing, Adiboo fights an evil "monster-blob".	
Adibou: Discover Music, Melody & Rhyme	2000	Macintosh, Windows	Coktel Studio	Knowledge Adventure	Minigames about music.	
Adiboo: Discover Nature, Animals & Planets	2000	Macintosh, Windows	Coktel Studio	Knowledge Adventure	Minigames about nature, animals, and planets.	
Adiboo: Discover Mazes, Numbers & Puzzles	2000	Macintosh, Windows	Coktel Studio	Knowledge Adventure	Minigames about maths and puzzle-solving.	
Adibou Présente la Magie	2000	Macintosh, Windows	Coktel Studio	Coktel Studio	Minigames for children including rock paper scissors and lessons in magic tricks.	
Adibou et l'ombre Verte	2002	Macintosh, Windows	Coktel Studio	Coktel Studio (PC), Sony Computer Entertainment (PlayStation)	Action-adventure game similar to Adiboo: Magical Playland.	
Adibou & Le Secret de Paziral (English: Adiboo & Paziral's Secret)	2003	PlayStation, Windows	Neko Entertainment	Vivendi Universal Games Int.	3D action adventure in which Adiboo must save the people of Tonies Island from the evil Paziral. Varied gameplay includes racing and platforming.	
Adibou & Les Voleurs d'Energie (English: Adiboo and the Energy Thieves/The Energy Thieves)	2004	PlayStation 2, Windows	Coktel Studio	Vivendi Universal Games Int.	Adiboo discovers that robots are stealing resources from Celesta to power a massive drill and he sets out to stop them. The game alternates between the 3D third-person hub world of Adiboo's home, platforming, vehicle chase sequences, and boss battles. There are also several minigames in the hub world. Gameplay is simple and Adiboo frequently breaks the fourth wall to inform and assist the player.	
Dis-moi ADI: Français - Maths CE2	2005	Macintosh, Windows	Coktel SAS		Lessons for children in maths and French.	
Adibou et les Saisons Magiques (English: Adiboo and the Magical Seasons)	2009	Wii	Mindscape SA		Garden-themed minigames that teach children about plants, insects, and the seasons.	
Adibou: L'app Pour Apprendre et S'amuser de 4 à 7 ans (English: Adibou: The App To Learn and Have Fun For 4 to 7 Years Old)	2022	iOS, Android, Browsers (Chrome, Microsoft Edge, Safari)	Wiloki		First new entry in the series since 2009.	

== TV series ==
An animated series, Adibou: Aventure dans le corps humain (Adiboo Adventure: Inside the Human Body), aired on French channels France 5 and TiJi, each of the 40 episodes usually lasting around 5 minutes.

== Critical reception ==
Referring to AJ's World of Discovery, Feibel felt there were better run and jump games available whereas Jeuxvideo argued that Adibou games were a good option for children but were too short. The Argus praised the series for its music but criticised its "daft" title. PC Mag praised Adiboo: Discover Nature, Animals & Planets for offering educational content and "hours of entertainment".

By 1997, the series had sold over 1.5 million copies. Today, the series is inactive and little in-depth information exists online apart from a few Let's Play series and articles.
