= Asterix and the Magic Carpet (video game) =

1987 video game

- Publisher: Coktel Vision
- Platforms: Amstrad CPC, Thomson TO8, Commodore 64, Amiga, Atari ST, MS-DOS
- Release: 1987
- Genre: Arcade/adventure
- Mode: Single-player

Asterix and the Magic Carpet (French: Astérix chez Rahàzade) is a computer game for the Amstrad CPC, Thomson TO8, Commodore 64, Amiga, and Atari ST home computers and for PCs running MS-DOS. The game is based on the eponymous volume 28 of the popular French Asterix comic books and was released in 1987.

== Gameplay ==
Asterix and the Magic Carpet starts as a graphical adventure game where the player chooses a character on the screen with a cursor and selects what he should say, which then influences how the rest of the game plays out. Occasionally, there are Pac-Man-like mini arcade games where Asterix has to defeat legionnaires, wild boars, or other enemies in a maze with the help of Obelix who oscillates back and forth in a fixed section of the maze. The general approach is to catch an enemy's attention, then run away and hide behind Obelix, who will hopefully defeat the enemy.

== Reception ==
Reception

Review scores
| Publication | Score | |
| Publication | Atari ST | DOS |
|---|---|---|
| Tilt | B | C |
| Power Play | 2.5/5 | |
