= E.S.S. Mega =

1991 video game

- Developer(s): Coktel Vision
- Publisher(s): Tomahawk
- Platform(s): MS-DOS, Atari ST, CDTV
- Release: 1991
- Genre(s): Simulation

E.S.S Mega (European Space Simulator Mega) is a space simulation game published by Tomahawk and developed by Coktel Vision. E.S.S. Mega recreates ESA's space vehicle concepts of the early 1990, specially the Hermes Shuttle. The game was released for MS-DOS and Atari ST in 1991, and Commodore CDTV in 1992.

== Gameplay ==
According to game's manual, the simulated timeline runs from January 2010 to December 2013. During that time the players need to make money by placing satellites into orbit, building a space station to run experiments and performing a successful shuttle landings.

The game balances realism and playability, offering real-time 3D graphics and management of many mission details. For example, the player needs to set up space shuttle cargo, crew and fuel. Mission steps include launch, orbital piloting (deploying or maintaining satellites, building and visiting a space station) and landing on a carrier.

== Reception ==
Joystick magazine gave the PC floppy version an 89% score and the CD-Rom version 91%. Amiga Joker gave the CDTV version a 3/5 score. Génération 4 reviewed the PC and Atari ST versions and gave them 77%.

== See also ==
- Buzz Aldrin's Race Into Space — a US-Soviet Space Race simulator
- Project Space Station
- Shuttle (video game)
