= The Last Dynasty =

1995 video game

- Developer: Coktel Vision
- Publisher: Sierra On-Line
- Platform: Microsoft Windows
- Release: 1995
- Genres: Adventure game, space combat simulator

The Last Dynasty is a 1995 video game developed by Coktel Vision and published by Sierra On-Line for Microsoft Windows.

In October 1996, German magazine MAN!AC previewed planned Sega Saturn and PlayStation conversions of The Last Dynasty. The magazine also reported that the game's production involved nearly a year of planning, followed by 30 days of filming professional actors against a blue screen. Computer-generated backgrounds and dubbed dialogue were subsequently added to the footage.

== Critical reception ==
Coming Soon Magazine rated the game 91/100: "I deliberately did not talk about the scenario because it would remove all the interest of the story when you buy the game. However, the fact that it features several hours of dialogue, SVGA graphics all throughout the game, lots of video sequences, action and adventure, should convince you that The Last Dynasty is a great game. Besides, I forgot to mention many other details such as the over 20 different types of vessels including allies and enemies, the permanent help in the cockpit from your on-board computer, the exterior views, the adventure in real time, and lots more. So what do you want me to say to make you buy this game? It is a great work!"

Computer Gaming World gave the game a score of 40%: "If this game was a big hit in Europe, then I guess it all comes back to the mystery of different sensibilities and expectations of a game. For all the glitter, The Last Dynasty doesn't offer anything more than you could have found on an Atari ST ten years ago, and the endless video clips leave the player feeling like flotsam carried away on the raging current of unchecked multimedia. If a game is going to force you into a dorky, clichéd character, the least it can do is give you some control over that character's destiny, instead of forcing you to watch him say and do dumb things".
