= Inca II: Wiracocha =

1993 video game

- Developer: Coktel Vision
- Publisher: Sierra Online
- Platform: MS-DOS
- Release: 1993
- Genres: Adventure game, Space combat simulator

Inca II: Wiracocha, also released as Inca II: Nations of Immortality, is a 1993 video game developed by Coktel Vision for MS-DOS. It is the sequel of Inca, which places a war between the Incas and the Spaniards in space, 500 years into the future.

== Gameplay ==
Like its predecessor, Inca II combines different genres including space combat simulator and adventure game. Some levels are purely shooting, some have maze exploration, or include inventory-based puzzles or riddles.

Game progress is marked with an autosave feature allowing the player to resume the game from any "chapter", or review any of the previously-seen cutscenes. In a few points of the game, the player is faced with a dilemma, which will affect the difficulty in the final battle of the game.

== Plot ==
After the events of the first game, El Dorado has become Sapa Inca of the new Inca Empire and his Aclla has given him a son, Atahualpa. The beginning of the game is set in Machu Picchu where the player controls Prince Atahualpa in his Huarachico; the player can choose between an inventory-based puzzle, or a space simulator sequence where they are tasked to destroy moai-shaped statues.

Finally, Atahualpa is accepted to the Council where a mysterious merchant pilot Kelt Carrier reveals that Spaniard Lord Aguirre controls an asteroid which disrupts communications throughout the Empire. Atahualpa talks to the stranger abruptly, resulting to him being expelled from the council by his father. Then he is subverted by Dona Angelina to steal his father's Tumi-shaped spaceship and fight the Spaniards alone. This mindless act gives Aguirre the opportunity to declare a new war.

El Dorado and Carrier come to arrest Atahualpa and participate in the ensuing space battle, during which Atahualpa attempts to take control of Kelt Carrier's "Three-Master" and is killed when the ship is destroyed. The control shifts to El Dorado for the rest of the game.

Carrier leads El Dorado to Yuna, a hermit-astronomer in the Australian desert, who devises a plan for destroying Aguirre's asteroid. While there, they discover the plans of the "Boomerang", a legendary spacecraft. Carrier is assigned in building a fleet of Boomerangs as El Dorado travels to three planets in order to place the three Inca powers of the previous game, and visits a volcanic island named Ibis, and a planet that resembles Tibet where he seeks the help of a lama.

In the end, Carrier's fleet of Boomerangs diverts Aguirre's ships surrounding the asteroid, where El Dorado attempts to rescue Aclla, before destroying it.

== Reception ==
Computer Gaming World liked Inca II's graphics, action, and music but criticized the schizophrenic gameplay and a voice acting. It is included in the magazine's list of Worst Games of All Time, described as "incoherent" and criticized for its "uneven graphics and ridiculous premise". It was also included as #18 in the game list with Worst Back Story of All Time. Conversely, PC Gamer US offered Inca II a score of 81%.

James V. Trunzo reviewed Inca II in White Wolf #49 (Nov., 1994), rating it a 3 out of 5 and stated that "Inca II was designed in France; a European sense of humor certainly comes through. While this arcade adventure has several unique features and a few rally enjoyable segments [...] much of the game may strike you as bizarre. Inca II may, like its predecessor, garner a cult following. Everyone else is going to wonder what the heck the game is about."
