= Legend of Djel =

1989 video game

- Developers: Coktel Vision; Inférence
- Publisher: Tomahwak
- Platforms: Amiga, Atari ST, MS-DOS
- Release: 1989
- Genre: Adventure

Legend of Djel is an adventure game developed by Coktel Vision and Inférence and published in 1989 by Tomahawk for Amiga, Atari ST, and MS-DOS.

== Plot ==
The player takes the role of a gnome named Djel. On their deathbed, his parents ask him to clear their name, proving they were of good moral character and not the magic-using troublemakers they were known for. He also needs to defeat a sorcerer.

== Gameplay ==
The game is a point-and-click adventure with 30 screens. The objectives in the game are:

1. Find the daughter of Azeulisses.
2. Brew a magic potion for Theros.
3. Obtain a certain amount of gold for the starving members of Kal's tribe.

== Development ==
Tomahawk was launched as a sister company to Coktel Vision in early 1989. Its first release, Emmanuelle, was negatively reviewed by critics. Legend of Djel previewed in Amiga Computing in August 1989. The sorcerer's daughter is visually based on the girlfriend of the game's graphic artist.

== Reception ==
Amiga Computing criticised both the gameplay and story for being unoriginal. Amiga Format felt the game had neither appeal nor depth. The Retro Spirit thought it was "a bizarre creation only the French knows how to do". The Games Machine felt the title was graphically and sonically impressive.
