= Earth Orbit Stations =

1987 video game

E.O.S.: Earth Orbit Stations
- Publisher: Electronic Arts
- Producer: Joe Ybarra
- Designer: Karl Buiter
- Platforms: Apple II, Commodore 64
- Release: 1987
- Genre: Simulation
- Modes: Single-player, multiplayer

E.O.S.: Earth Orbit Stations is a space station construction and management simulation video game developed by Karl Buiter for Electronic Arts. It was released for the Commodore 64 and Apple II in 1987.

== Gameplay ==
The game focuses on both the material and economic challenges of building a permanent, fully functioning space station in geocentric orbit.

The player(s) chooses to play one of the various scenarios, each with differing objectives to fulfill, all of which start in the spring of a fictional 1996. These scenarios consist of mundane tasks such as setting up a simple space station, to developing and supplying a specified amount of high-grade, zero G pharmaceuticals, and to being the first to contact alien life. The game is also a cutthroat strategy game in multiplayer, as players compete over finite resources to achieve the scenario goal first.

== Reception ==
Computer Gaming World in 1987 gave the game a mixed review. While the single-player portion was praised, the review felt the game had too high a learning curve to be suitable for multiplayer. The user interface was particularly bothersome, described as "a textbook case of how not to design a window/menu/graphics interface." The documentation was similarly described as poorly organized and cryptic. In 1992 and 1994 surveys of science fiction games the magazine gave the title two-plus stars of five, calling it "An interesting failure ... the logistics just are not that much fun". Compute! reviewed the game more favorably, stating that "EOS offers a level of challenge unusual in space-related software. To succeed at this game requires careful thought".

== See also ==
- Project: Space Station
