= Bargon Attack =

1992 video game

- Developer(s): Coktel Vision
- Publisher(s): Coktel Vision
- Director(s): Claude Marc; Serge Marc
- Producer(s): Claude Marc; Serge Marc
- Programmer(s): M.D.O.
- Artist(s): Rachid Chebli
- Composer(s): Charles Callet
- Platform(s): Amiga, Atari ST, MS-DOS
- Release: 1992
- Genre(s): Adventure

Bargon Attack is an adventure game, originally released in Spain and France in 1992. The cyberpunk game uses stylized art presented in a 2.5D format.

== Plot ==
Adventuregames.com describes the plot:

By means of the software the BARGON ATTACK, the Bargonians have managed to infiltrate the solar system. If you have good observation skills, nerves of steel and quick wits, you will save the Earth from total destruction.

== Gameplay ==
Mr Bill's Adventure Land describes the gameplay:

This is a science fiction type game with Bargons / aliens that you need to avoid or shoot while finding out how to keep the Earth from being destroyed. It relies mostly on puzzle situations, with some elementary shooting as well as a tough underwater crab mini game (shoot the small crabs without hitting the big crab). It also relies on finding items and clues and figuring out how to use those items in the correct way and in the correct places.

== Development ==
Bargon Attack is an adaption of a French cartoon of the same name by Racheed & Marc Brothers, published in 1989 and 1991 in Micro News. It is one of the lesser known Coktel Vision games, and was one of the first to use a new interface that was copied for many later titles from the company. It was one of the first to use FMV technology in cut-scenes. Two versions of the game have been published on PC: 16 & 256 colors. In the latter, the intro is voiced without subtitles.

== Reception ==
Joystick (French) rated the game 94 out of 100, Génération 4 rated it 80%, Joker Verlag präsentiert: Sonderheft rated it 78%, Gamezone (Germany) rated it 60%, and Power Play rated it 59%.

=== Retrospective reviews ===
Home of the Underdogs said: "Bargon Attack is a fun, campy adventure that would probably appeal to Coktel fans more than anyone else. The game's longer-than-average length and some hunt-the-pixel puzzles also makes for many hair-pulling sessions where you desperately try every inventory object with everything on the screen". Obligement wrote: "In short, no more haggling, Bargon Attack is an average game with a gameplay view and review, graphics somewhat limits and a soundtrack that has probably been forgotten on a bench by a November evening, but it is partially saved with its down-home style, and its totally abstract concept "game adapted from a comic magazine". Try it, you do not risk anything, it's French". The book Science Fiction Video Games by Neal Roger Tringham deemed the game "largely incomprehensible".

Abandondonia wrote: "In the end, this game deserved to be forgotten by history. This is Coktel's Pandora's Box, with nearly every sin an adventure game can make all rolled into this one game. You should get stuck because of tough puzzles, not because of demented design decisions, which you'll drown in when playing this game. Bottom line: avoid this game unless you want to see exactly what adventure games shouldn't do". Mr. Bill's Adventureland said: "I personally recommend this game fairly well. It is good fun, the graphics are well done, the story is the usual save-the-earth basic scenario, the puzzles and connections are very logical (except where the unavailable manual is required or the walkthrough), and it is very satisfying to play when you solve a tricky puzzle or situation. Try to play it without the walkthrough, but you will definitely need to resort to the walkthrough at a few points. Bargon Attack is an interesting and attention holding game that I am sure many people will enjoy and some people will hate".
