= Alien Gate =

1993 video game

- European cover art
- Developer: SPC Vision
- Publisher: Philips
- Producers: Franc Beernink; Rob Hormann
- Programmers: Stefan Posthuma; Tim Moss
- Artist: Niklas Malmqvist
- Platform: CD-i
- Release: 1993
- Genre: Fixed shooter
- Mode: Single-player

Alien Gate is a fixed shooter developed by SPC Vision and published by Philips for the CD-i.

== Gameplay ==
Alien Gate is a fixed shooter. Each stage consists of the player's ship facing off against a giant head that spawns several smaller enemies. Once all the required enemies are defeated, the player must defeat the head as a boss. The background gives the impression of a vertically scrolling shooter, but the attackers stay in position relative to the player's ship. There are 25 stages and 14 different enemy types.

== Development ==
Alien Gate was developed by Dutch studio SPC Vision. It was co-designed and programmed by Stefan Posthuma and Tim Moss while Niklas Malmqvist provided the graphics. The code and graphics were all written using the Atari ST. The project began as a demo provided to publisher Philips who were so impressed that they commissioned a full release as well as a five-game contract with the developer. Moss had come to SPT from a British university as an intern. Alien Gate was put together during that six week period and Moss was asked to return for a permanent position. The group disbanded upon the failure of the CD-i. Posthuma subsequently took a job at the Canadian developer Gray Matter while Moss returned to England to work for Argonaut Games.

== Reception ==
Reception

Review scores
Publication	Score
Joystick	53%
Next Generation	1/5
Power Unlimited	82%

Next Generation reviewed the CD-i version of the game, rating it one star out of five, and stated that "Those who actually want shooting action from their CD-i will do better to stick with games like Mystic Midway than to delve into this painfully deficient travesty." Power Unlimited gave the game a score of 82% commenting: "Alien Gate is very difficult. You will have to practice for a long time, because if you don't know the levels by heart, you won't get very far. If you're a stickler this game will have a long shelf life." Alfred Debels of another Dutch magazine, Software Gids, concurred about the game's difficulty. stating that despite the game cover's advertisement for children ages six and up that it would be challenging even for adults. He recommended using the mouse or joystick, finding the game unplayable with the standard CD-i controller.
