= The Bizarre Adventures of Woodruff and the Schnibble =

1994 French video game

- North American cover art
- Developer: Coktel Vision
- Publisher: Sierra On-Line
- Director: Muriel Tramis
- Writer: Muriel Tramis
- Composer: Charles Callet
- Engine: Gob
- Platform: Microsoft Windows
- Release: December 1994
- Genre: Adventure
- Mode: Single-player

Woodruff and the Schnibble of Azimuth (marketed in North America as The Bizarre Adventures of Woodruff and the Schnibble) is a 1994 adventure game developed by Coktel Vision. The creator of the Gobliiins series, Pierre Gilhodes, worked on the game, and Woodruff shares that series' visual style, gameplay and offbeat humor, though is not an official part of the Gobliiins series or canon.

The game was released in December 1994 on Windows 3.1, and was later released for newer Windows versions. Woodruff was distributed in North America in 1995 by Sierra On-Line. The game exists in French, English, Spanish, German and Polish.

== Plot ==
=== Setting ===
Following the near-annihilation of Earth during the last atomic war, the surviving human population retreated to the center of the planet where the last traces of life-sustaining warmth remained. Waiting out the surface radiation, centuries passed before the humans finally ventured back into the world above, discovering that their planet had sprouted a lush, overgrown jungle in their absence along with various races of mutants, including a peaceful race known as the Bouzouk (spelled "Boozook" in the US release), who differ from humans by their tails, pointed ears, and extraordinarily long noses. In the societal structure of the Bouzouk there was a King and a Council of Wisemen, seven mystics who had successfully maintained universal harmony by guarding the Chprotznog, a sacred containment unit used to channel and subsequently trap evil spirits.

Having failed to learn their lesson from last time, the humans immediately waged war on the tranquil Bouzouk tribe in what became known as "The Great Battle". In a mere day, the humans destroyed the Bouzouk civilization, massacring many innocent civilians and looting their holy artifacts, including the Chprotznog. The surviving Bouzouks were enslaved and forced to construct a new society for the humans, the great vertical city of Vlurxtrznbnaxl, an economically self-sufficient city run on wind power and surrounded by rich farmland. Its citizens live in different parts of the city according to their socio-economic status: the poor live on the lower levels while the rich and powerful live on the higher levels. The remaining Bouzouk peoples became exploited and oppressed; their once great society in shambles, they're left to work menial jobs and manual labor, living uneasily alongside the humans while their deposed King now spends his days in his dilapidated castle, drinking beer and watching TV.

=== The present ===
The game begins about a century later, where the great city has since devolved into a nightmarish dystopia under the rule of a bureaucratic and totalitarian government. Heading the government is the reclusive President, who's represented by his corrupt advisor, a hideous man known only as the BigWig. In the lower levels of the city, relations between humans and Bouzouks have grown to their tensest, giving rise to a group known as the Bouzouk Freedom Party, a terrorist organization who, being natural pacifists, have yet to commit any actual acts of terrorism.

Woodruff (right) chats with a local.

Professor Azimuth, an eminent political and scientific human personality known for his work on manipulating the aging process of cells, sympathizes with the plight of the Bouzouks and becomes determined to help end their oppression. In his research, he discovers the legend of the Schnibble, a mystical entity that is believed to have the ability to cause peace and prosperity to flourish in times of need, and begins work on finding a way to unleash it. Word spreads about his goal, and Azimuth is hailed as a hero by the Bouzouk community. The word of the Schnibble also reaches the ears of the BigWig. To stave off any chance of a revolution, the BigWig and his thugs storm the home of Professor Azimuth and his young adopted half-human, half-Bouzouk son, Woodruff.

Azimuth barely has time to hide Woodruff before the BigWig breaks into their home, kidnapping the Professor and ruthlessly gunning down Woodruff's beloved teddy bear in the process, but not before befitting him with a Viblefrotzer, an invention of his own design that helps rapidly speed the aging process. Within seconds, Woodruff ages about fifteen years, finding himself now prepared (albeit without shoes or literacy) for an epic quest: Rescue his adopted father, avenge the death of his teddy bear by exacting revenge on the BigWig, and unravel the mystery of the Schnibble to help bring harmony back to the city.

== Gameplay ==
Woodruff's relatively simple point-and-click interface is nearly identical to the one featured in Sierra's King's Quest VII: by moving the cursor over certain objects, they'll become highlighted, indicating that it's an item or person Woodruff can interact with. Woodruff's inventory is accessed by clicking the right mouse button; clicking and dragging an inventory item onto a highlighted object will combine the two. However, if the items do not connect, Woodruff may openly mock the player.

== Reception ==
Reception

Review scores
Publication	Score
PC Gamer (US)	90%
Computer Game Review	88/87/85
Electronic Entertainment	4/5

Despite a less-than-heralded release in America, Woodruff was released to primarily positive reviews, with most praise being given to its visual style and sense of humor. Strategy Plus (now Computer Games Magazine) gave it its most notable review, claiming it was "so addictive, you may lose your job", which ended up being printed on the box's front cover and used in most of its advertisements. The review further elaborated with "…features splendid high-resolution graphics that provide further evidence that Sierra is on a roll". PC Gamer also praised the game for its "exceptional graphics and sound", comparing it to other offbeat adventure games such as Day of the Tentacle and Sam & Max Hit the Road. French magazine Joystick called it "truly wonderful" and "a real cartoon". MobyGames currently gives it a ranking of 85 out of 100.

Of the negative aspects of the game, Gamer's Zone, although having given it a positive review, complained about the often ludicrously hard puzzles, the lack of original music, and the repetitive background sound effects, complaints that were often echoed in other reviews.

Despite critical acclaim, however, Woodruff failed to find a mass audience and turned out to be a financial disappointment for Sierra, eventually slipping into obscurity behind most of the company's better-known titles. Although Woodruff has been more or less largely forgotten within the adventure game genre (so little information is there that the game's English voice actors have never been identified; the French version, however, features the voices of Edgar Givry as Woodruff and Claude Piéplu as the narrator), there still remains a small, yet devoted cult fanbase.

== See also ==
- Gobliiins
