= Cluedo (CD-i video game) =

1994 video game

- Developer: 3T Productions
- Publisher: Philips Interactive Media
- Series: Cluedo (franchise)
- Platform: CD-i
- Release: 1994
- Genres: Murder mystery, adventure

Cluedo (also known as Cluedo on CD-i) is a 1994 murder mystery video game based on the board game of the same name. It was developed by 3T Productions and published by Philips Interactive Media.

== Plot and gameplay ==
The rules are the same as those of the board game, and up to six people can play. In three cases "The Hooded Madonna", "Happy Ever After" and "Deadly Patent", players are tasked with deducing who killed Mr. Boddy. Each time the player chooses enter a room on the board they are transported into a virtual room as photographed at Arley Hall, the same location as the 1990 Cluedo British game show. A red magnifying glass will reveal a clue, while a ticking clock is a hint that a video sequence can be accessed. Each story has four different outcomes, and as a result there are 12 scenarios on the disc.

== Development ==
The game was developed by the Manchester-based 3T Productions. By May 1994, 3T Productions had just completed filming the drama portions of Cluedo. Joan Sims reprised her role as Mrs. White after playing her in the 1990 Christmas Special of the British game show Cluedo. International versions of the game only featured text in English. Subsequently, 3T teamed up with Granada - producer of the British Cluedo game show - to adapt its anthropological TV series Disappearing World for the CDi.

== Sequel ==
A sequel entitled Cluedo: The Mysteries Continue was released in 1995, also filmed at Arley Hall. Its three adventure were "Road to Damascus" "Blackmail" and "Not In My Backyard". In the United States it was called Clue 2: The Mysteries Continue.

== Critical reception ==
CD-i Magazine wrote it is a "superb adaptation", and "slick and polished", writing it "keep[s] the feel of the original game by using a first rate cast". The magazine added that the ''live” sequences are what "really give Cluedo on CDi the edge", and gave it a rating of 90%. CD Interactief thought the game proved that the transition from board game to screen could be made successfully, and deemed it a "successful conversion". The Video Game Critic wrote that like many CD-i titles, the game had great production values but poor gameplay. CDi Reviews wrote it had a lot of replay value.

Cluedo: The Mysteries Continue won gold in two categories at the Cannes International ICDIA Awards.
