= Fish Fillets NG =

Video game

Fish Fillets - Next Generation
- Developers: Ivo Danihelka, and others
- Initial release: April 24, 2004; 22 years ago
- Stable release: 1.0.1 / September 9, 2011; 14 years ago
- Written in: C++, SDL, Lua
- Operating system: Cross-platform
- Size: ~152 MB (varies by platform)
- Available in: Czech, English, German, French, Polish, Italian, Dutch, Spanish, Russian, Brazilian Portuguese, Slovenian, Swedish, Bulgarian, Esperanto
- Type: Puzzle video game
- License: GPL-2.0-or-later
- Website: fillets.sourceforge.net
- Repository: git.code.sf.net/p/fillets/code-fillets-ng

Fish Fillets NG, originally known as Fish Fillets, is a puzzle video game developed and released by Altar Games in 1998. The objective of the game is to find a safe exit for both fish in each level. Similar to other sliding puzzle games like Sokoban and Klotski, Fish Fillets includes several unique elements and rules.

== Gameplay ==
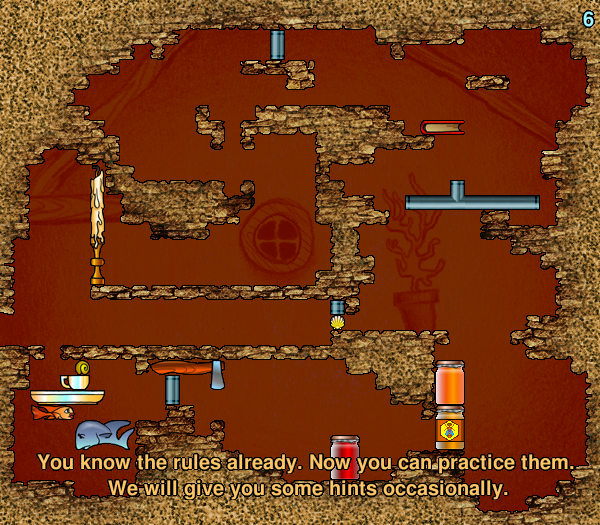
Starting position of level 3, "Rehearsal in Cellar"

The game features two fish, both controlled by the player, who must navigate through levels by moving objects and overcoming obstacles to reach a safe exit together. Unlike traditional sliding puzzle games, Fish Fillets NG incorporates gravity, causing unsupported objects to fall until they land on another surface. If an object falls on either fish, it results in the fish's death, and the level must be restarted to continue. One fish is larger and capable of lifting or pushing specific objects (such as steel items), adding an extra layer of complexity to the puzzles. Additionally, players cannot slide objects over the fish's back, as this is equivalent to an object landing on the fish. However, if a fish is supporting an object, it can move back and forth underneath, and objects can be carefully slid off the fish's back if they are moving onto solid ground. The game features background music and includes animated effects on many levels, although these elements typically do not influence gameplay.

== History ==
The game was originally created by Czech video game developer Altar Games and released commercially in 1998. In 2002, it was relicensed and released under the GNU GPL-2.0-or-later on SourceForge. In 2004 fans created a new version ("Next Generation") based on the open-source release. The fan community ported the game to many other operating systems, created an extra branch of levels, and translated it to many languages.

== Reception ==
Fish Fillets was selected in March 2008 as "HotPick" by Linux Format.

Fish Fillets NG was downloaded between 2004 and May 2017 alone via SourceForge.net over 180,000 times.
