= Playtoons =

- Genre(s): Point-and-click adventure, interactive storybook
- Developer(s): Coktel Vision
- Publisher(s): Sierra On-Line
- Artist(s): Paco Salamander
- Platform(s): Windows, Mac OS
- First release: Playtoons 1: Uncle Archibald; 1994
- Latest release: Playtoons 5: The Stone of Wakan; 1995

Playtoons is a series of linked games, released in 1994 by Sierra On-Line, which allow players to make their own animations using a variety of characters, backgrounds, scenery and props from either a single game or a mixture from the full series. The games are focused on teaching children school topics in a digital format meant to be more enthralling for kids.

Included with each game is a cartoon introducing the characters and situations. In addition to playing the story straight through, players can jump to any page in the story, with some of the pages leading to unlisted pages.

== Series storylines ==
=== Uncle Archibald ===
The narrator introduces his friend, Ben, who lives with his Uncle Archibald, who owns a shop. In Archibald's past, he wrote stories about witches, wizards, and monsters. He kept a description of each monster on his computer, which Ben and the narrator, peep at. One monster particularly catches their eye: Ogre Kringle, who eats kids with chocolate sauce.

Later Ben and the narrator are looking for an unnamed secret formula, when they add the contents of "a little green bottle" and there is an explosion. A dense fog moves through the house, and the lights go out. Going to the kitchen, looking for candles, the pair discover a monster looking through the refrigerator, complaining that he was unable to find any chocolate sauce. The pair manage to neutralise Ogre Kringle before he can find the sauce and eat them.

Fearing more of the monsters from the stories, they call Uncle Archibald and tell him everything. There is a loud footstep, and the pair take refuge in the living room. When the lights come on, all the monsters are there laughing at them. Fatso, a large brown monster, grabs them as Uncle Archibald storms in. The monsters, fearing the wrath of their creator, let the two friends go.

Archibald threatens the monsters; if they did not go back to the stories then he would send them to a soppy love story. The ashamed monsters vanish.

Archibald explains that the little green bottle contained a spell that materialized things that we imagine.

== See also ==
- Disney's Animated Storybook
- Living Books
- Magic Tales

== Notes ==
- Series names from: NewMedia: Titles, Volume 21, Waterlow New Media Information, (1999) ISBN 1-85783-869-6. (Snippet view) Retrieved November 2011.
