= GX Games =

1991 video game

- Publisher: Genius Microprograming
- Release: 1991
- Genre: Various

GX Games is a 1991 video game compilation published by Genus Microprogramming.

== Gameplay ==
GX Games is a game package which contains the games Apples & Oranges, Mind Plus, Space Miner, Puzzler and Black Jack. These games were all written with the toolkits that came as part of the GX Development series from the company. The package also contains the source code for each of these games.

== Reception ==
Mike Weksler reviewed the game for Computer Gaming World, and stated that "GX Games is a product for both the programmer who has invested in one or more libraries of the GX Development series and wishes to learn some gaming techniques, and the gamer who has some programming experience and wants to know how games tick, as well as how to modify them. As such, it is a showcase for 2-D gaming possibilities and what can be accomplished with one’s programming language compiler and Genus libraries."

Programmers Paradise noted that "Not only are the games fun to play, they are an excellent learning tool for the GX Development Series. The games make the learning interesting and they cover most of the major concepts when writing any kind of graphics oriented program."
