= Solar Crusade =

1996 video game

- Developer: Infogrames Multimedia
- Publisher: Infogrames Multimedia
- Platforms: Windows; CD-i
- Release: Windows: WW: 1996; Phillips CD-i: WW: 1999
- Genre: FMV game
- Mode: Single player

Solar Crusade, the follow-up to Chaos Control, is a rail shooter video game designed and published by Infogrames Multimedia, created using Softimage 3D, and modeled on Silicon Graphics workstations hardware for the Windows 95 operating system and Phillips CD-i video game console. This was the last official released game on the CD-i in its lifetime and the only one to be released in 1999.

== Reception ==
Reception

Review score
Publication	Score
CD-i	82%
