= CD Shoot =

1992 sporting video game

- Developer: Eaglevision Interactive Productions
- Publisher: Eaglevision Interactive Productions
- Platform: Philips CD-i
- Release: 1992
- Genres: action game, sport game

CD Shoot is a video game developed and published by Eaglevision Interactive Productions for the Philips CD-i in 1992. The aim of the game is clay pigeon shooting. The game has four modes: sporting, olympic trap, balltrap and English skeet.

== Reception ==
Rated by	Date	Score
Power Unlimited	September 1993	75%
The CD-i Collective	2004	40%
