= Urban Runner =

1996 video game

- Developer: Coktel Vision
- Publisher: Sierra On-Line
- Designers: Philippe Lamarque; Silvan Boris Schmid
- Engine: Gob
- Platforms: MS-DOS, Windows 3.1
- Release: UK: July 1996; NA: July 25, 1996
- Genre: Interactive movie
- Mode: Single-player

Urban Runner is a French produced computer game developed by Coktel Vision and published by Sierra On-line.

The game is an interactive movie spanning four CD-ROMs. The plot follows an American journalist in Paris who has been framed for murder during the course of an investigation. The lead is played by Brandon Massey, who was previously the lead in the Police Quest IV: Open Season (1993).

The game uses a resolution 640 × 480 with 8-bit or 32-bit color, which was a high requirement at the time of release.

== Plot ==
Max Gardner (Brandon Massey) is an American journalist in Paris, where he investigates a story about a drug trafficker who is protected by an influential politician. To get the dealer talking, Max offers him incriminating photographs in exchange for some information. When Max arrives at the meeting point, the drug lord is dead and Max is mistaken for the killer.

While evading the authorities, Max continues his investigation and finds an ally in Adda—the murdered drug dealer's lover—and the two of them work to uncover the conspiracy behind the murders.

== Gameplay ==
The game itself is an interactive movie controlled with a mouse. As with many games of this type the player progresses by collecting items, talking to characters and solving puzzles. The player will also accumulate Clues - pieces of information which are essential to solving the mystery - which are separate from the inventory and cannot be given away or lost.

Should the player be having difficulty in progressing, they begin the game with three Jokers to use, which act as a hint system.

The player's viewpoint switches from Max to Adda at certain points in the game and sometimes gives the player a choice of which character to control. However, both characters must have the puzzles in their respective areas solved to progress.

Gameplay can be divided into Clue and Action sections. Clue sections are puzzle-based with no time limit; players may have to explore an environment, talk to characters or interact with objects to progress. Action sections give the player a short amount of time to make a decision - making the wrong choice usually results in character's death.

== Development ==
According to the French newspaper Les Échos, Urban Runner was created by a team of 50 people. By December 1995, it had been in development for one-and-a-half years and its budget had risen to 15 F million (equivalent to nearly 3.6 million € by 2023). Three months were spent on the game's live-action film shoots. Les Échos reported that Urban Runner's budget had climbed high enough that it would need to sell 500,000 units to break even.
