= Geisha (video game) =

1990 video game

- Developers: Coktel Vision; MDO
- Publisher: Tomahawk
- Designer: Muriel Tramis
- Artist: Pierre Gilhodes
- Writer: Muriel Tramis
- Composer: Frédéric Motte
- Engine: Gob
- Platforms: Amiga, Atari ST, MS-DOS
- Release: 1990
- Genre: Adventure

Geisha is an erotic adventure video game developed by Coktel Vision and MDO and published by Tomahawk in 1990 for Amiga, Atari ST, and MS-DOS. The game uses a point-and-click interface, and includes several minigames including a card game and an action sequence.

== Plot ==
A mad scientist kidnaps the player's girlfriend Eva, and wants to transform her into a futuristic geisha. The player travels to Japan to prevent this from happening.

== Reception ==
Joystick praised the game's original design, while Generation 4 felt the game's graphical quality was unexceptional. Tilt described Geisha as a children's game for adults due to its simple gameplay and mature themes. Amiga Power questioned whether it was the worst full-price game the magazine had ever reviewed, while also commenting the title was as "user-friendly and sexy as a rotten anchovy".
