= Great Naval Battles: Guadalcanal 1942–43 =

1994 strategy video game

Great Naval Battles: Guadalcanal 1942-43
- Publisher: Strategic Simulations
- Platforms: MS-DOS, PC-98
- Release: 1994
- Genre: Computer wargame

Great Naval Battles: Guadalcanal 1942–43 is a computer wargame and the second game in the Great Naval Battles series. It was published in 1994 by Strategic Simulations for MS-DOS and PC-98.

== Gameplay ==
Great Naval Battles Vol. II: Guadalcanal 1942–43 depicts naval combat in the Pacific Ocean during World War II.

== Reception ==
Computer Gaming World in July 1994 rated Great Naval Battles Vol. 2, Guadalcanal 2.5 stars out of five. The reviewer praised the "simply superb" graphics and ability to automate or manually control systems. He criticized the inadequate documentation, reporting that he needed more than ten hours to learn how to play, and lack of replay value in the historical scenarios and "boring, ahistorical, and monotonous" campaign. The reviewer concluded that SSI should combine its graphics and detail with Gary Grigsby's Pacific War's game design.
