= Fascination (video game) =

1991 video game

- Developer: Tomahawk
- Publishers: Coktel Vision; Digital Integration
- Designer: Muriel Tramis
- Programmer: Philippe Lamarque
- Artists: Yannick Chosse; Joseph Kluytmans; Rachid Chebli
- Composer: Frédéric Motte
- Engine: Gob
- Platforms: Amiga, Atari ST, MS-DOS
- Release: 1991
- Genre: Graphic adventure
- Mode: Single-player

Fascination is an erotic thriller graphic adventure game developed by Tomahawk and published by Coktel Vision for the Amiga, Atari ST, and MS-DOS in 1991.

== Gameplay ==
Fascination is a first person point and click game. By moving the cursor over certain objects, they'll become highlighted, indicating that it's an item or person that the player can interact with. Items can also be placed in the player's inventory for later use. The plot is advanced by talking to other characters and solving puzzles.

== Plot ==
After having landed in Miami, Doralice takes the briefcase to her hotel room.

After the plane from Paris landed in Miami, Fayard Nichols, one of the passengers, suffered a heart attack and died in the arms of pilot Doralice. Fayard entrusted Doralice with his briefcase and asked her to bring the vial inside of it to his boss, the head of Q.U.L., Jeffery Miller. In her hotel room, Doralice is able to find the vial hidden inside an electric toothbrush and then calls Jeffrey. Miller tells Doralice to meet him at his office, so he can explain to her what has been going on.

Doralice then gets a call from fellow pilot Robaire de la Cafetiere, also known as Rob, who asks her to meet up at the pool. At the pool, she also encounters Prisca, her chief hostess, who has been questioned about Fayard's death by an inspector in a wheelchair with a cat. After having spent some time with Rob and Prisca, Doralice leaves so she can head off to Q.U.L., but not before arranging to meet up with Rob in the evening.

Upon arrival, she finds Miller's corpse together with a cassette. On the tape, Miller explains that the vial, that Doralice got from Fayard, is a sample of his most important invention. Miller decided to give it to the government, due to constant threats. There are only three prototype vials: one is with Doralice, one is with Miller's son Kenneth and one was stolen by Peter Hillgate, better known as Doc. Jeffery suspected that Doc stole the vial so that he can obtain the formula by analysis and thus asks Doralice to seek out the stolen vial at Doc's underground laboratory, so she can then give it to Kenneth.

After having gained access to Doc's hidden laboratory, Doralice finds not only one but two vials, which means that Doc had also already stolen Kenneth's prototype. Furthermore, she also finds a bunch of photos taken by a certain Lou Dale, as well as evidence that Doc knows that Doralice has the third vial.

Back in her hotel room, Doralice finds Rob, who was waiting for her. Rob is lying on her bed, still breathing but unconscious, surrounded by a completely trashed room. After a bit of investigation, she comes to the conclusion that Doc's henchman probably searched her room for the vial, which at that point had already been consumed by Rob. During her absence she also received a package, which turned out to be a box of chocolates. She then calls the reception to let them know what happened and is informed that an inspector is waiting for her in the lobby. The police inspector turns out to be the same inspector that interrogated Prisca and he introduces himself as Pedro di Helgos. While Dolarice was talking to the officer, Rob came running down the stairs and left the hotel.

Having found out Lou's phone number, Dolarice calls her and pretends that she has a job for her, whereupon Lou gives Dolarice her address. At the photo studio, Lou is tied up and guarded by one of Doc's minions. Doralice quickly mixes up some poisonous gas to incapacitate the guard and saves Lou. Lou then explains that she was contacted six months ago for an undercover job. She was ordered to seduce Kenneth Miller and to take his photos. Those were the photos that Dolarice found in Doc's laboratory. Lou also reveals that Doc is an ex-surgeon and that the pictures might have been needed for plastic surgery. At last, Lou tells Dolarice that she can find Kenneth during the evening at a certain club in the red light district.

At the nightclub, Doralice finds Kenneth and is able to seduce him into taking her home. At Kenneth's place, they start making out. At some point, Doralice takes out the box of chocolates that were sent to her hotel room and gives one of them to Kenneth, who subsequently passes out. Just as Doralice had suspected, the chocolates were laced with drugs. Upon further inspection, she finds a tattoo on Kenneth's body that shows a heart and the names Archie and Lucy. Furthermore, she also finds proof that he is in contact with Doc, implying that he is not the real Kenneth Miller. Heading downstairs, she finds a hidden passage that leads to Doc's secret laboratory. This time, Doc is there too and he knocks her out immediately.

The next day, Doralice wakes up in front of the Pedro. He tells her that a saved her from Doc and asks her to hand over the vials. Doralice demands to be able to freshen up in the bathroom first, which she is allowed to do. In the bathroom, she fills up a perfume bottle with formaldehyde and then uses it take out Pedro, who turned out to actually be Doc. Doralice is able to find a secret passage, that leads her to a jail cell in which the real Kenneth is locked up. Upon releasing Kenneth from the cell, Doralice is greeted by Rob and the rest of the people that she has interacted with during this adventure. Rob explains that he has set up a role-playing game business and that he wanted to try out the story line before offering it to the public.

== Reception ==
Fascination received mixed reviews reception upon its release, including some very positive review scores of upwards of 90% for the PC version in French magazines; the Amiga reviews ranging from a high 80% in CU Amiga, through moderate 67% and 65% in Amiga Power and Amiga Format, to only 51% and 47% in Amiga Action and Amiga Computing. Retrospectively, Richard Cobbett of PC Gamer opined the game has had "perhaps the stupidest ending of any game in history".

Polish scholar Filip Jankowski criticized Cobbett's opinion, remarking that Fascination's ending predicted the finale of David Fincher's film The Game (1997). Compared to Fincher's film, Fascination more evidently criticizes capitalism. Jankowski stated that in the game's ending, all game characters turn out to participate in a murder party, the majority of them belonging to the white male establishment responsible for the pornographic content of the game world. Thus, leaving the area of the murder party, Doralice questions the patriarchal norms. Jankowski also stressed that Fascination was among the first video games featuring the female protagonist and adopting her viewpoint.
