= Great Naval Battles =

- Cover art for Great Naval Battles: North Atlantic 1939–1943.
- Genres: Ship simulation, strategy
- Developers: IO Design Group (1–3); Divide By Zero (4–5)
- Publisher: Strategic Simulations
- First release: Great Naval Battles: North Atlantic 1939–1943; 1992
- Latest release: Great Naval Battles V: Demise of the Dreadnoughts; 1914–18

Great Naval Battles is a series of computer wargames by Strategic Simulations which simulate combat between naval vessels. It consist of five separate games, four of which depict various phases of World War II. Each game combines a wider view of the action on a fleet scale, as well as controls for individual ships. SSI covered similar themes in another naval game, Fighting Steel, which was released afterwards, in 1999.

== Games in series ==
The game series contains the following games:

- Great Naval Battles: North Atlantic 1939-1943 was released in 1992 and depicts naval warfare in the North Atlantic during World War 2.

- Great Naval Battles: Guadalcanal 1942-1943 depicts naval combat in the Pacific Ocean during World War 2.

- Great Naval Battles Vol. III: Fury in the Pacific, 1941–1944 is a direct sequel to #2 and depicts the remainder of the Pacific Ocean war. It was not considered to be as strong a product as the previous two games, as it had some problems with bugs. the game structure was problematic due to some attempts to include air combat.

- Great Naval Battles 4: Burning Steel 1939–1942 was released in 1995 and constituted a major overhaul of the game. It utilized entirely new procedures and interfaces. Several new features were provided, including the ability to full customize each combat scenario.

- Great Naval Battles V: Demise of the Dreadnoughts; 1914–18 is set in World War I, and does not include aircraft. It was only sold in the boxed set Great Naval Battles – the Final Fury, which contained all games of the series plus GNBNA.

== Gameplay and dynamics ==
Every game provides a choice between individual ship views and fleet command views. Players can choose individual stations to operate during the game.

== Background music ==
=== Great Naval Battles: North Atlantic 1939–1943 ===
When "British" is being selected for the gameplay, Rule Britannia is being played. Whereas if "German" is being selected, Unter dem Doppeladler is being played.

== See also ==
- Naval warfare
- Harpoon (series)
