= Apprentice (video game) =

2003 video game

- Developer(s): Herculean Effort Productions
- Publisher(s): Herculean Effort Productions
- Series: Apprentice
- Engine: Adventure Game Studio
- Platform(s): Windows
- Release: July 10, 2003
- Genre(s): Point-and-click adventure

Apprentice is a point-and-click adventure game released on Windows by American studio Herculean Effort Productions as freeware in 2003. It was created using the open source development tool, Adventure Game Studio.

== Gameplay ==
The player controls Mortimer "Pib" Pibsworth, a young apprentice dreaming of becoming a wizard. The game opens with a dream sequence where he is confronted by Lord Ironcrow, the region’s ruler. Lord Ironcrow tries to persuade Pib to become a soldier, but Pib’s refusal leads him to wake up, screaming. His teacher then checks on Pib and informs him that before he can learn his first spell, he must find the necessary ingredients.

== Development and release ==
The game began as a side project while the developers worked on The Find, introducing the player to the game world and some of its characters. Therefore, the game was criticised for its short length and a lack of any real storyline. Furthermore, the dream sequence at the beginning of the game bears no relevance to the rest of the game. Nevertheless, Apprentice was praised for its high production values and is even mentioned as a good example of a game created with Adventure Game Studio in the book Gaming Hacks published by O'Reilly Media. The game won four AGS Awards in 2003 for Best Room Art, Best Character Art, Best Animation and Best Music.

The first version of Apprentice was released on July 10, 2003. The first bug fix version, which also added a bonus puzzle to the game, was released on the 28th. Two years later, on May 29, 2005, HEP released a Deluxe version of the game, which improved animations and music and added voice overs to the game.

The Apprentice series is planned as a trilogy. The sequel Apprentice II: The Knight's Move was released on July 29, 2004. The release date of the last game in the series, Apprentice III: Checkmate! is unknown.

Herculean Effort Productions also released a commercial superhero point-and-click adventure game called Super Jazz Man on December 21, 2006.
