= Lost in Time (video game) =

1993 video game

- European cover art
- Developer: Coktel Vision
- Publishers: EU: Coktel Vision; NA: Sierra On-Line
- Designer: Muriel Tramis
- Composer: Charles Callet
- Platform: MS-DOS
- Release: 1993; 1994 (CD-ROM)
- Genre: Adventure
- Mode: Single-player

Lost in Time is a computer adventure game developed and published by Coktel Vision in 1993. It was promoted as being "The first Interactive Adventure Film using Full Motion Video Technology" and contained four graphical elements: full motion video, hand painted and digitized backgrounds and 3D decor.

== Plot ==
While exploring a shipwreck in 1992, a woman is mysteriously transported back in time to 1840 when the ship was still intact. As she explores and gathers clues to return to her own time, her sleuthing leads to revelations about her past.

== Release ==
The original release in Europe was divided into two parts – that is, two sets of 3.5" Floppy disks sold separately. A CD-ROM version, Lost in Time: Parts 1 & 2, was released at the same time as the floppy version and contained enough storage space for both parts as well as additional and longer video sequences with a higher frame rate and digitized speech. In North America, the game was released on floppy disk and CD-ROM sets as well, but the floppy disk set was not split into separate parts and was released in a single, complete package.

== Reception ==
Reception

Review scores
Publication	Score
Electronic Entertainment	8 out of 10
PC Zone	69 %

In April 1994 Computer Gaming World said of Lost in Time on CD that "though game play is interesting and movement through the 3D world is fluid", the video and music was not as good as in Inca. The magazine concluded that despite some "obtuse" puzzles, "there's still enough going on to entice those gamers who missed catching reruns of Time Tunnel".
