= Great Naval Battles: North Atlantic 1939–43 =

1992 video game

Great Naval Battles: North Atlantic 1939-1943
- Series: Great Naval Battles
- Platform: MS-DOS
- Release: 1992
- Genre: Computer wargame

Great Naval Battles: North Atlantic 1939–43 is a computer wargame which is the first in the Great Naval Battles series. It was published for MS-DOS by Strategic Simulations in 1992.

== Gameplay ==
Great Naval Battles: North Atlantic 1939–43 depicts naval warfare in the North Atlantic during World War 2.

== Reception ==
Computer Gaming World's reviewer in January 1993 stated that North Atlantic 1939–43 was the first computer game to replicate "that 'joy of miniatures'". He cited several flaws in the gameplay but concluded that "for all the problems ... there are a half-dozen very nice features. For every minor disappointment there seem to be several glitzy positives. Frankly, I'm spending a lot of time playing it". A September 1993 review in the magazine of America in the Atlantic, Super Ships of the Atlantic, and Scenario Builder praised the latter's "infinite" replayability from the latter's random engagements, and stated that "SSI's efforts in refining and expanding this series are to be commended ... it has the potential of becoming the recognized placebo for practitioners of historical naval combat in this theater". A survey that month in the magazine of wargames gave North Atlantic, Super Ships of the Atlantic, America in the Atlantic, and Scenario Builder three-plus stars out of five. In April 1994 the magazine said that the CD version of North Atlantic 1939–1943's inclusion of all expansion disks and editors "made it a good buy for aspiring captains of the Bismarck", concluding that "It would be hard indeed to find a more comprehensive simulation of ship-to-ship naval warfare in WWII".
