= Galactic Empire (1990 video game) =

- Developer: Tomahawk
- Publisher: Coktel Vision
- Platforms: Amiga, MS-DOS)
- Release: 1990
- Genre: Space flight simulator
- Mode: Single-player

Galactic Empire is a space flight simulator video game developed by Tomahawk and published in 1990 by Coktel Vision. The player is conquering the universe, roaming from planet to planet. A sequel was released: A.G.E.
