= Lost in Time (2019 film) =

2019 Kenyan thriller film

- Directed by: Peter Kawa
- Written by: Edijoe Mwaniki
- Produced by: Peter Kawa & Jimmy Gorge
- Cinematography: Andrew Evens Odera
- Edited by: Andrew Evens Odera
- Music by: Noel Grass
- Release date: 24 October 2019
- Running time: 1 hour 49 minutes 23 seconds
- Country: Kenya
- Languages: English; Swahili

Lost in Time is a 2019 Kenyan film written by Edijoe Mwaniki. It is a psychological thriller which focuses on the issue of mental health.

So far, the film has won five Kalasha awards in total. The awards categories includes "The best feature film", "best director" (Peter Kawa), "best actor in the film" (George Mo), "best screenplay" (Edijoe Mwaniki) and "best sound design" (Karanja Kiarie).

== Synopsis ==
=== Lost in Time (2019 film) ===
Lost in Time is a 2019 Kenyan psychological thriller film directed by Peter Kawa and written by Edijoe Mwaniki. The film stars George Mo, Sheila Murugi, and Natasha Sakawa. It explores themes of grief, trauma, and mental health within a family setting.

==== Plot ====
The story follows Sam (George Mo), a man plagued by recurring nightmares involving his daughter, Sifa (Natasha Sakawa). His wife (Sheila Murugi) attempts to console him, though Sam remains unsettled and dismissive of her reassurances. Following the death of a close family member, tensions resurface during the funeral, leaving Sam increasingly agitated. His nightmares persist, coupled with bouts of anger and paranoia, which raise concern among his wife and neighbours.

==== Themes ====
The film examines the psychological effects of unresolved grief and familial conflict, portraying how trauma can manifest in mental instability. Set in a rural Kenyan landscape, the film incorporates elements of local culture while addressing broader issues of mental health awareness.

==== Production and release ====
Lost in Time took two years to complete. It premiered on October 24, 2019, at Anga Cinemas in Nairobi, where it screened for nine days. Subsequent screenings were held at Mega Cinemas in Kisumu and later at Nairobi Cinema in December 2019.

Reception

The film received positive critical reception and was noted for its handling of mental health issues within a Kenyan context. At the Kalasha Awards 2019, it received ten nominations. It won in five categories: Best Feature Film, Best Director (Peter Kawa), Best Actor (George Mo), Best Screenplay (Edijoe Mwaniki), and Best Sound Design (Karanja Kiare).

== Cast ==
- George Mo as Sam Weto
- Lucy Njoroge as Dr. Lilian Kareithi
- Alan Oyugi as Michael Kareithi
- Sheila Murugi as Judy Weto
- Natasha Sakawa as Sifa Weto
