= Galactic Warrior Rats =

1992 video game

- Developer: Mikev Design
- Publisher: Summit Software
- Programmers: Kevin Franklin (Amiga); Nick Thompson (MS-DOS)
- Artist: Michael Owens
- Composer: Don Whitaker
- Platforms: Amiga, MS-DOS
- Release: 1992: Amiga; 1993: MS-DOS
- Genre: Platformer
- Mode: Single-player

Galactic Warrior Rats is a 1992 platformer developed by Mikev Design and published by Summit Software for the Amiga. A port to MS-DOS was released the following year. The game was included in the 1994 Famous Collection compilation.

== Gameplay ==
The player chooses of one of the three Galactic Warrior Rats who pilot a biosphere vehicle. The biosphere can have its speed, weapons, ammunition and handling upgraded. Upgrades require credits. During the gameplay, the player will maneuver the rat in his biosphere. The object is to guide the biosphere through maze-like levels to the exit. The biosphere can fire in one of eight directions. Destroying enemies earns credits. Touching enemies drains the biosphere's vitality. If one rat dies in the biosphere explosion, the player must choose a different rat to play. If all three rats are destroyed, then the game is over.

== Plot ==
Three laboratory rats named Einstein, Newton, and Darwin enter a spaceship, soon crashing on a planet called Smeaton Five. The explosion of the spaceship kills them, but they mutate into humanoid-like creatures termed the Galactic Warrior Rats.

Meanwhile, Smeaton Five is highly polluted. The three rats navigate through the planet's dangerous complex and destroy defense robots. They ultimately shut down the core computer to save Smeaton Five and themselves.

== Reception ==
Reception

Review scores
Publication	Score
PC Zone	75%
CU Amiga	75%
Amiga Power	64%
The One	80%
