= Kether (video game) =

1993 video game

- Developer: Infogrames
- Publisher: Philips
- Platform: CD-i
- Release: EU: October 1993; NA: January 1994
- Genres: Space flight simulation, adventure
- Mode: Single-player

Kether is a video game developed by Infogrames and published by Philips for the CD-i.

== Gameplay ==
Kether is a game that mixes elements of both action and graphic adventure.

== Development and release ==
Kether was developed by French studio Infogrames through its subsidiary International World Productions (IWP). Infogrames sought to provide early support to publisher Philips and its CD-i during the fourth generation of video game consoles due to advances brought on by the system's optical disc technology. Kether was one of seven projects from IWP, which was specifically established to contribute to a second wave of CD-i software for Philips.

Guy Selva, the game's artistic director and one of its writers, desired to create a space opera that would offer the player the opportunity to take advantage of the CD-i's audio and graphical capabilities. Production mirrored that of a feature film with a script written first and foremost and live actors included via full-motion video cutscenes. The 3D computer-generated imagery work was outsourced to Brussels-based Little Big One (LBO), which utilized Silicon Graphics workstations running TDI Explore and Paintbox software. Production was overseen by Infogrames chairman, CEO, and general director Bruno Bonnell. He mentioned that CD-i games during this period would require an estimated three million franc budget with a minimum of seven people working for 15 months. At this cost, at least 50,000 units would have to be sold to make a profit.

First announced in mid-1992 as The Mystery of Kether (Le Mystère de Kether), it was initially scheduled to launch that September. However, it was delayed. By mid-1993, the game had been in development for over two years. Philips finally released it in Europe that October. A television special titled La Nuit des Jeux Vidéo (Video Game Night) aired on channel France 3 on November 26, 1993 and was a collaboration between Philips Media France, Tilt, and Consoles +. As part of the special, individuals competed against one another playing Kether in order to win a copy of the game and a Philips CD-i model 210. Kether was released in North America in January 1994. The game eventually came bundled with the Maganvox CD-i model 200 in the region.

== Reception ==
Reception

Review scores
| Publication | Score |
|---|---|
| Computer and Video Games | 84% |
| Edge | 6/10 |
| Electronic Gaming Monthly | 23/40 |
| GamePro | 3.3/5 |
| Joystick | 95% |
| Next Generation | 3/5 |
| Tilt | 79% |
| CD Magazine (IT) | 4/5 |
| CD-i Magazine (UK) | 95% |
| Génération 4 | 90% |
| Power Unlimited | 92% |
| VideoGames | 8/10 |

Kether received mostly positive reviews. Next Generation reviewed the game, rating it three stars out of five, and stated that "Challenging puzzles and a mystical atmosphere round out the title into a CD-i adventure that's a cut above many of its peers. Power Unlimited have a score of 92% summarizing: "If Philips had made more games of Kether's caliber, their CD-I might have become a serious gaming system. The game offers many (easy) puzzles, bundled with the most beautiful 16-bit graphics and sounds."
