= The Games '92: España =

1992 video game

- Developer(s): Creative Materials
- Publisher(s): Ocean Software
- Platform(s): Amiga, Atari ST, MS-DOS
- Release: EU: July 1992
- Genre(s): Sports
- Mode(s): Single-player

The Games '92: España is a 1992 sports video game developed by Creative Materials and published by Ocean Software for the Amiga, Atari ST, and MS-DOS.

== Gameplay ==
The game is based on the 1992 Summer Olympics that were held in Barcelona, Spain. There are over 30 events like relay swimming, 100 metres, judo, and wrestling. 36 countries are available for representation.

== Reception ==
Reception

Review scores
Publication	Score
Amiga Action	90%
ST Format	40%
CU Amiga	59%
The One	59% (Amiga)
Pelit	15% (Amiga, DOS)

The Games '92: España received generally negative reviews. CU Amiga called the game an "appalling sports sim". ST Format said the events are badly designed, the graphics average, and controls sluggish. Pelit called The Games '92 one of the worst full-priced games ever released. Amiga Action said the game is "the most complete athletics simulation of all time". The One wrote that all events are "fundamentally simplistic rhytmic joystick wagglers with little subtlety or lasting interest."
