= The Apprentice (video game) =

1994 video game

- North American cover art by Dennis Zopfi
- Developer: The Vision Factory
- Publisher: Philips Interactive Media
- Producer: Luke S. Verhulst
- Designers: Arjen Wagenaar; Stefan Posthuma
- Programmer: Tim Moss
- Artist: Niklas Malmquist
- Composer: Joost Egmond
- Platform: Philips CD-i
- Release: NA: 1994; EU: November 1994
- Genre: Platform
- Mode: Single-player

The Apprentice is a 1994 vertically scrolling platform game developed by The Vision Factory and published by Philips Interactive Media in North America and Europe exclusively for the Philips CD-i. The first title to be created by The Vision Factory for the CD-i platform, the game is set on a fantasy setting inside the castle of wizard Gandorf S. Wandburner III, as players assume the role of young apprentice magician Marvin in order to complete a series of tasks given by his master while facing multiple mischiefs and creatures along the way.

Headed by Steel Machine artist Luke S. Verhulst alongside longtime God of War programmer Tim Moss, The Apprentice was created by most of the same team that previously worked on several projects at SPC Vision and who would later go on to work at one of its offshoots before the company declared bankruptcy in 2002.

The Apprentice was met with positive critical reception from reviewers since its release, with praise towards the presentation, graphics, sound design and gameplay, though some reviewers drawing comparison with Dimo's Quest. In recent years, it has been referred by publications such as Retro Gamer to be one of the best titles for the system. A sequel was in development but it never released after multiple attempts.

== Gameplay ==
Gameplay screenshot.

The Apprentice is a vertically scrolling platform game where players assume the role of young apprentice magician Marvin in order to complete a series of tasks given by his master wizard Gandorf S. Wandburner III, while facing multiple mischiefs and creatures along the way. At the end of each stage, a boss must be fought in order to progress further, while bonus stages are also introduced as well.

== Development and release ==
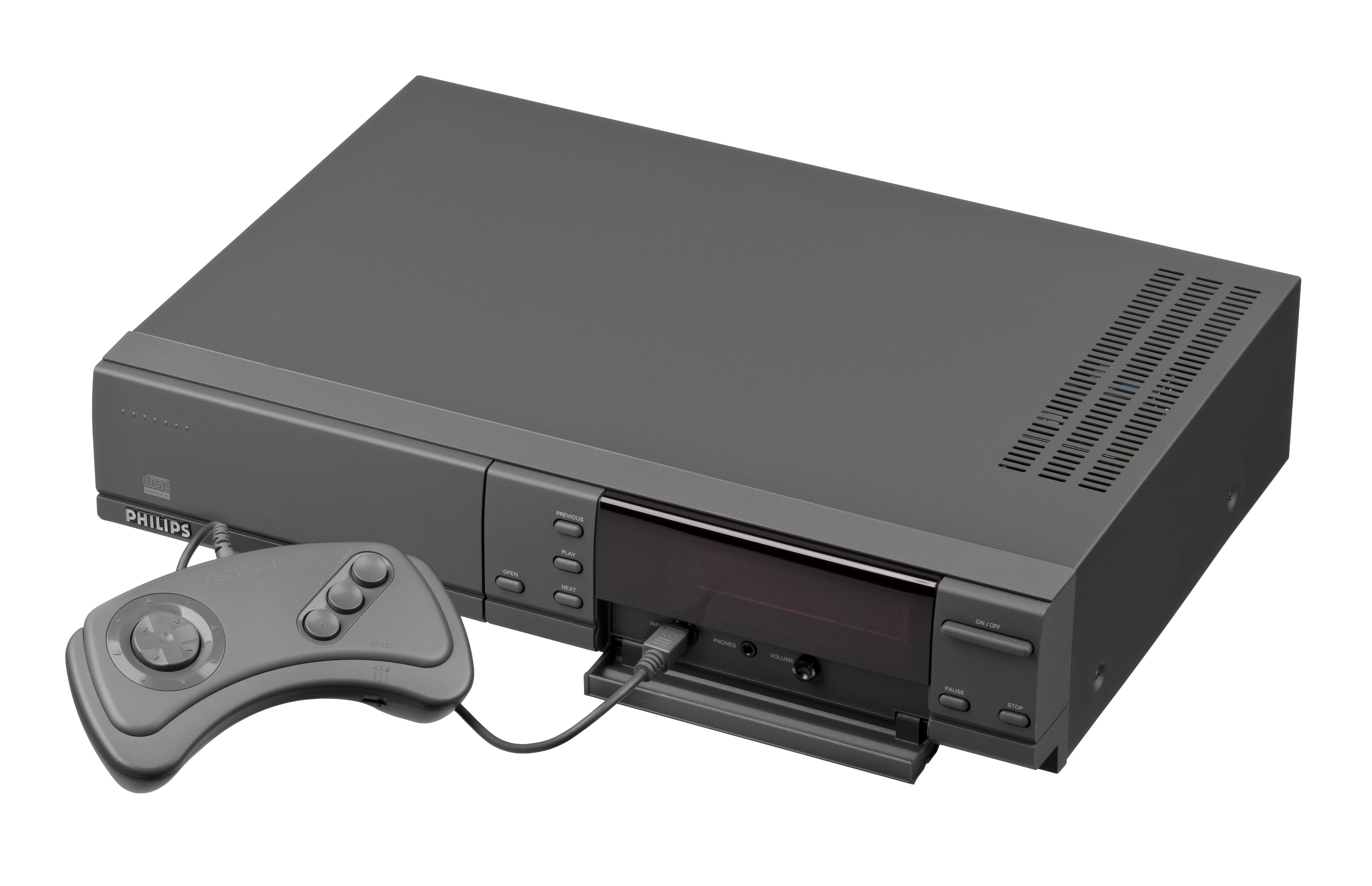
The Apprentice was developed for the Philips CD-I.

The Apprentice was created by most of the same team that previously worked on several projects at SPC Vision and who would later go on to work at one of its offshoots before the company declared bankruptcy in 2002. Its creation was helmed by producers Luke S. Verhulst and Tim Moss, with both sharing multiple roles during development respectively. The soundtrack was composed by Joost Egmond, while the sound effects were created by Joris de Man. Several other people also collaborated in its production.

A former member of the team recounted on his personal web page about most of the techniques used during the game's development cycle. The title was released in North American and European markets in 1994, featuring artwork by Dennis Zopfi on the cover arts of each region.

== Reception ==
Reception

Review scores
Publication	Score
Joystick	81%
MAN!AC	71%
Micromanía	81%
Superjuegos	91 / 100
VideoGames	6 / 10

The Apprentice was met with positive reception from critics since its release and has been regarded in recent years to be a standout title for the CD-i. Betty Hallock of VideoGames: The Ultimate Gaming Magazine gave positive remarks in regards to the graphics, sound and gameplay. French magazine Joystick gave the title an overall rating of 81%.

== Legacy ==
A sequel to The Apprentice was in development but it never released after multiple failed attempts.
