= The Vision Factory =

Dutch video game developer

- Industry: Video games
- Founded: 1993
- Defunct: 2002
- Fate: Bankruptcy
- Headquarters: Den Bosch / Eindhoven, Netherlands
- Products: CD-i games

The Vision Factory (also known under the names SPC Vision, SPC Codim and SPC Group) was a Dutch developer of video games for the Philips CD-i.

The Vision Factory was originally a developer of business software named SPCC (allegedly an acronym for Sergeant Pepper's Computer Company). They impressed Philips with CD-i games with colorful sprites, like the shooter Alien Gate. The Vision Factory was the label under which the SPC games were released. Their most famous game is probably the puzzle game Dimo's Quest, that was originally developed by Boeder Games / Infernal Byte Systems for the Amiga and was ported by SPC to CD-i.

In 1996, Philips stopped supporting the CD-i, which meant the demise of the company. In 2002, SPC / The Vision Factory went bankrupt.

== Games ==
- Alien Gate (CD-i, 1993)
- Steel Machine (CD-i, 1993)
- Dimo's Quest (CD-i, 1994) (port of Amiga game originally developed by Boeder Games/Infernal Byte Systems)
- The Apprentice (CD-i, 1994)
- Philips Media Encyclopedia (CD-i, 1995) (exclusive for the Netherlands)
- Die CD-i mit der Maus: Auf dem Bauernhof (CD-i, 1995) (exclusive for Germany)
- Het Staat in de Sterren (CD-i, 1996) (exclusive for the Netherlands)
- Lingo (CD-i, 1994 / Windows, 1997) (exclusive for the Netherlands)
- Sport Freaks (CD-i, 1996)
- Uncover featuring Tatjana (CD-i, Windows, 1996)
- Lucky Luke: The Video Game (CD-i, 1996)
- Accelerator, (CD-i, 1997)
- Golden Oldies I: Guardian & Invaders (CD-i, 1997)
- Golden Oldies II: Blockbuster & Bughunt (CD-i, 1997)
- Scramble (CD-i, prototype)
- Breaker (CD-i, prototype)
- The Apprentice 2: Marvin's Revenge (CD-i, cancelled)
