= Mystic Midway: Rest in Pieces =

1992 video game

- Genre: Shoot 'em up
- Developer: Philips
- Publisher: Philips
- Platforms: CD-i, MS-DOS
- Original release: 1992: CD-i; 1994: MS-DOS

Mystic Midway is a horror-themed shoot 'em up video game released by Philips for the CD-i in 1992. An MS-DOS version followed in 1994. The player must shoot targets to advance to the next level.

== Plot ==
A sarcastic, ghostly theme park owner named Dr. Dearth (Randy Polk) explains all the info about the game, and mysteriously vanishes.

== Gameplay ==
The objective of the game is to accumulate the needed number of points to advance to the next level. Points are scored by shooting down targets. Tombstones appear to block the player's attacks. After either beating or losing a level, Dr. Dearth will either comment or criticize your progress.

== Legacy ==
This game was followed by a sequel, Mystic Midway: Phantom Express, in 1993.
