= Inca (video game) =

1992 video game

- Developer: Coktel Vision
- Publisher: Sierra On-Line
- Platforms: CD-i, MS-DOS, Classic Mac OS
- Release: 1992: MS-DOS; 1993: CD-i; 1994: Mac
- Genres: Adventure, Space combat simulator

Inca is an adventure video game developed by Coktel Vision and published by Sierra On-Line in 1992 for MS-DOS. Versions for CD-i and Classic Mac OS followed. The game describes the conflict between Inca Empire and Spaniards in a science fiction setting. A sequel, Inca II: Wiracocha, was released in 1993.

== Gameplay ==
Inca has elements of both space combat simulators and adventure games. Some levels are purely shooting, some have maze exploration, or include inventory-based puzzles or riddles. Game progress is marked with numerical passcodes that are given after specific points of the game (12 in the disk version, 16 in the CD), allowing the player to resume playing from that chapter.

== Plot ==
500 years after his death, Huayna Capac, the last grand Inca, prepares a warrior called El Dorado to gather three gems of Time, Energy and Matter, and fight Aguirre, the Spanish leader. The action begins in an asteroid space station called Paititi (its surface is marked with lines similar to the Nazca lines) from which El Dorado hurls to space flying a Tumi-shaped spaceship.

The quest brings him dodging asteroids, dogfighting with Spanish spaceships, fighting his way through mazes and performing puzzles (rituals) to summon the mummy of Pachacutec the Renovator for hints. The directions lead him to the statues of the "Founders of Huaca", Mama Ocllo and Manco Cápac, who give him the Jewel of Time. On his way back, he is captured on board the Spanish mothership (actually a galleon flying in space) trying to escape.

Afterwards he rids Paracas (a moon marked by a shape similar to the Paracas Candelabra) from Spanish ships and he meets the Aclla who acknowledges him as the new Sapa Inca and gives him the Jewel of Matter.

The Jewel of Energy is guarded by Mayans on a planet. After wandering in a maze and passing through puzzles, El Dorado reaches the "Intihuatana of Machu Picchu", where he claims the final jewel. Afterwards he uses them in combination to solve the final puzzle and is awarded the sacred tumi, sign of his anointment as son of the sun.

In the final stage El Dorado finds himself again in Aguirre's galleon, where the two duel against each other.

== Release ==
Originally released on diskettes, the game was also released as Inca Multimedia CD. The remake provides some longer or additional cutscenes and an updated soundtrack (as well as full voiceover soundtrack) in Audio CD format, read directly from the disc; the introduction features the song "Inca People" by J.M. Marrier composed for the game. The game in the CD version is divided in 16 chapters instead of 12, allowing the player to resume to more specific checkpoints, and the Mayan level has an additional area with more puzzles.

== Reception ==
Reception

Review scores
Publication	Score
Power Unlimited	90/100
CD-i magazine	85%

Computer Gaming World stated in September 1993 that despite excellent audio and good graphics "the game failed to achieve its full potential", with abrupt arcade sequences interrupting the story; "As a result, Inca comes across as a loosely strung together series of action sequences, mazes and puzzles", which would "not strongly appeal to either action gamers or adventurers". The magazine advised purchasing another Sierra game and the Inca soundtrack on CD. In April 1994 the magazine said that the game had "puzzles of modest difficulty and joystick bustin' action sequences", "but the plot and, to a lesser degree, the interface left much to be desired". Reviewing the CD-i version, GamePro praised the "outstanding, imaginative story line that spans time and space" and the "cool, magical music punctuated by South American flute tunes", but commented that the poor controls and frequent load times slow the game to a crawl. Power Unlimited gave the cd-i version as score of 90% summarizing: "Inca is an example of how the CD-I player can produce a good game. A game that combines action, adventure and riddles with beautiful images and sounds."

Next Generation gave the CD-i version of the game one star out of five, criticizing the CD-ROM's loading times and voice acting.

== Legacy ==
A sequel was released in 1993, Inca II: Wiracocha, in which the player controls El Dorado and Aclla's son, Atahualpa.
