= Chaos Control (video game) =

1995 video game

- Developer: Infogrames Multimedia
- Publishers: Europe; Philips (MS-DOS, CD-I); Infogrames (Saturn); North America; I•Motion; Japan; Virgin Interactive Entertainment
- Designers: Bruno Bonnell; Jean-Claude Larue
- Composer: Thierry Caron
- Platforms: CD-i, Mac , PlayStation, Saturn, MS-DOS
- Release: July 2, 1995; October 4, 1996 (PlayStation, Japan)
- Genre: Rail shooter
- Mode: Single-player

Chaos Control is a rail shooter developed by Infogrames Multimedia and published by Philips Interactive Media for the CD-i, MS-DOS, Mac, Saturn, and PlayStation in 1995. The game's cutscenes are rendered in a style reminiscent of anime. In Japan, the Sega Saturn had two versions released. The second, published by Virgin Interactive Entertainment, was retitled Chaos Control Remix to avoid confusion with the previous year's release that had no lightgun support. The Sega Saturn's European Chaos Control and the Japanese Chaos Control Remix included lightgun support and a two-player option. The sequel Solar Crusade was released in 1996.

== Gameplay ==
Chaos Control is a sci-fi themed rail shooter which puts the player inside the cockpit of a fighter ship. Although the spaceship flight is automated, the player may target freely using an on-screen reticule, timing their shots so that the fighter's guns do not overheat. Targets across the game's four levels include mech suits, other spaceships and virtual reality constructs, most of which will return fire in an effort to drain the player's shields. There are no bonuses or re-charge power-ups for these shields, and play must restart from the beginning of the level if the player's ship is destroyed.

Enemy positions are predetermined and unchanging. This - in combination with fixed flight paths - means that the player can seek to learn the game's deployment pattern for each level, defeating them through memorization.

Chaos Control Remix supports the Saturn's Virtua Gun. The CD-i version requires the CD-i's Digital Video Cartridge to play.

== Plot ==
Manhattan level: three Kesh Rhan ships surround the Statue of Liberty

In the year 2050, the alien Kesh Rhan species discovers the Pioneer 10 space probe. When they decipher the coordinates of Earth from the Pioneer Plaque, Lord Commander Arakh'Kreen orders the fleet to invade and destroy the planet.

The player controls Lieutenant Jessica Darkhill, a human pilot in the Orbital Defence Forces. She seeks revenge for the death of her fiancé, Morgan Kain, who was killed during an earlier battle with the Kesh Rhan on Mars. With the Kesh Rhan flagship having appeared above Earth for a final attack, Darkhill is promoted to Major and ordered to Manhattan to lead an attack against the Kesh Rhan forces and prevent the destruction of the planet.

== Reception ==
Reviewing the CD-i version, GamePro commented that "Chaos Control is a looker, a fun way to waste some time. As far as depth and challenge, though, it doesn't deliver the chaos that it should." They criticized the lack of multiple weapons and rail shooter gameplay as too limited, but praised the heavily detailed backgrounds and the high level of onscreen action. Next Generation admired the "spectacular visual results" of the full motion video and stylish animations, but advised that the game would bore anyone who does not enjoy the "straightforward and mindless" gameplay of full motion video-based rail shooters. They scored the game two out of five stars. GamePro later awarded it Best CD-i Game of 1995. Power Unlimited gave the CD-i version a score of 85% summarizing: "Chaos Control is a beautiful shoot 'em up for the CD-i, finally with a woman in the leading role. It looks fantastic, it sounds good and the story is compelling. Too bad that, like most games for CD-i, it is very slow."

Rob Allsetter gave Chaos Control Remix 56% in Sega Saturn Magazine. Like reviews for the CD-i version, he was pleased with the graphics, citing the polished rendering and sense of depth, but found the gameplay monotonous, since the unrelenting pace prompts the player to simply fire indiscriminately at the screen. He also judged the longevity to be exceptionally low, since the game can be finished in roughly half an hour and the absence of scoring features such as an accuracy ratio leaves it with no replay value.

Computer Game Review was sharply critical of Chaos Control's computer version, dubbing it a substandard copy of Star Wars: Rebel Assault. In 1996, Computer Gaming World declared Chaos Control the 38th-worst computer game ever released.
