= Coktel Vision =

French video game developer and publisher

- Company type: Subsidiary
- Industry: Video games
- Founded: 1984; 42 years ago
- Founder: Roland Oskian
- Defunct: October 2005; 20 years ago
- Fate: Merged into Mindscape
- Headquarters: Paris, France
- Parent: Sierra On-Line (1994–1996); Vivendi Universal Games (1996–2005); Mindscape (2005–2011)

Coktel Vision (also known as Coktel and Coktel Studio) was a French video game developer and publisher based in Paris. It was best known for its educational and adventure games.

== History ==
Coktel Vision was founded in 1984 by Roland Oskian, an engineer and a former executive at Matra Espace. The French gaming market was still developing at the time, the company consisted of only several people who worked from Oskian's house, with Roland acting as a director and composer and his wife Catherine creating graphics and cover art.

Coktel made its name by publishing simulation, action and narrative-driven adventure titles for the Thomson and Amstrad CPC computers. Their catalogue included both original and licensed games often based on Franco-Belgian comics such as Asterix, Lucky Luke and Blueberry. They saw a quick growth and in several years entered the edutainment market, while also starting to port its games to PC and Macintosh.

In 1986, Muriel Tramis joined Coktel Vision. Known as the first female French video game designer, she quickly turned into the studios' leading talent, developing some of its best-selling games and gaining the informal title of "Roberta Williams of France". Tramis often explored political and social themes novel for its time such as imperialism, slavery and eroticism, collaborating with the créolité writer Patrick Chamoiseau. Yet her name is usually associated with more family-friendly series like Gobliiins co-created with Pierre Gilhodes and Adibou, the long-running commercially successful educational games that had sold over 1.5 million copies by 1997.

Tramis described Coktel Vision as a diverse company with a "start-up atmosphere" that allowed plenty of freedom to its designers. During the early 1990s Coktel experimented with various formats such as 3D and FMV and enjoyed continued strong growth: in 1993 it made 75 million francs against 30 million in 1992, with the Adibou series covering 65% of the French edutainment market and 35% of the European market. By 1996 those numbers increased up to 75% in France.

In 1992, the company was acquired by the American publisher Sierra On-Line (the deal was finalised on 29 October 1993). Ken Williams later said that Sierra was more interested in expanding its European educational sales than in Coktel's games. As part of the deal, Sierra published popular French titles worldwide while Coktel localised and published Sierra's games through its Tomahawk publishing label. In 1996 after Urban Runner became a commercial failure the company decided to focus on educational titles rather than adventure games.

In February 1996, Sierra along with its subsidiaries was acquired by CUC International, with Coktel becoming part of CUC's new CUC Software branch. CUC was then merged with HFS Incorporated into Cendant and in 1998 sold its software branch to the French publisher Havas, which was acquired by Vivendi. Coktel continued producing edutainment titles, focusing on the European market only; in 1999 Roland Oskian left the company, and in 2003 he was followed by Muriel Tramis after the new management decided to subcontract some of the major Coktel's titles.

In October 2005, Coktel Vision was sold to French publisher Mindscape, wherein eleven Coktel employees were absorbed into Mindscape. Mindscape retained the Coktel brand until closing in 2011.

== Subsidiaries ==
- MDO – a Bordeaux-based company which did all the programming. Named after its three founders: Mathieu Marciacq, Arnaud Delrue and Roland Oskian.
- Tomahawk – presented as a subsidiary, it was only a label that Coktel Vision used to publish simulation and erotic games to distance themselves from edutainment titles.

== Games published ==
Year	Title
1987	Asterix and the Magic Carpet
1987	Dakar Moto
1987	Méwilo
1987	Robinson Crusoe
1988	20,000 Leagues Under the Sea
1988	Freedom: Rebels in the Darkness
1988	The Jungle Book
1989	Asterix: Operation Getafix
1989	Emmanuelle
1989	Oliver & Company
1989	Legend of Djel
1990	No Exit
1990	Geisha
1990	Galactic Empire
1991	E.S.S. Mega
1991	Fascination
1991	Gobliiins
1991	Little Red Riding Hood
1992	A.J.'s World of Discovery
1992	Bargon Attack
1992	Ween: The Prophecy
1992	Gobliins 2: The Prince Buffoon
1992	Inca
1993	Goblins Quest 3
1993	Lost in Time
1994	The Bizarre Adventures of Woodruff and the Schnibble
1994	Inca II: Wiracocha
1994	Playtoons 1: Uncle Archibald
1994	Playtoons 2: The Case of the Counterfeit Collaborator
1995	The Last Dynasty
1995	Playtoons 3: The Secret of the Castle
1995	Playtoons 4: The Mandarin Prince
1995	Playtoons 5: The Stone of Wakan
1996	Urban Runner
1999	Adiboo's Magical Adventure
2001	Adiboo and the Green Shadow
2002	Zibouille : Neunoeuf en cavale
2003	Adiboo & Paziral's Secret
2003	The Cat in the Hat
2004	Adiboo and the Energy Thieves
2004	Crash Bandicoot Fusion
2004	Spyro Fusion
