= Gone Fishin' (video game) =

1994 video game

- Developer: SimGraph
- Publisher: Amtex
- Platform: MS-DOS
- Release: 1994
- Genre: Fishing
- Mode: Single-player

Gone Fishin' is a fishing video game developed by SimGraph for MS-DOS and published in 1994 by Amtex. The player takes part of a fishing tournament in the Bay of Quinte in Lake Ontario, including buying fishing equipment at a store and getting advice from both the storekeeper and an older man at a nearby fishing lodge.
