= List of Strategic Simulations games =

This is a list of games by Strategic Simulations Inc (SSI), the former video game developer and publisher that existed from 1979 to approximately 2001. In March 2001, SSI was acquired by Ubisoft, who retired the brand name sometime afterwards.

Video game platforms
3DO	3DO	AMI	Amiga	APPGS	Term not found
APPII	Apple II family	ATR	Atari 8-bit computers	ATRST	Atari ST, Atari Falcon
C64	Commodore 64	CPC	Amstrad CPC	DOS	DOS / MS-DOS, Windows 3.X
FM7	FM-7	FMT	FM Towns	GEN	Sega Genesis / Mega Drive
MAC	Classic Mac OS, 2001 and before	MSX	MSX	NES	Nintendo Entertainment System / Famicom
PC88	PC-8800 series	PC98	PC-9800 series	PS1	PlayStation 1
SCD	Sega CD / Mega CD	SMS	Sega Master System	SNES	Super Nintendo / Super; Famicom / Super Comboy
TRS80	TRS-80	WIN	Microsoft Windows, all versions Windows 95 and up	X1	Sharp X1
X68K	X68000	XBOX	(replace with XB)	ZX	ZX Spectrum

Video game genres
4X	4X game	Action	Action game	Action RPG	Action role-playing game
Action-adventure	Action-adventure game	Business sim	Business simulation game	Grand strategy	Grand strategy game
MMORPG	Massively multiplayer online RPG	Roguelike	Roguelike, Roguelite	RPG	Role-playing video game
RTS	Real-time strategy	RTT	Real-time tactics	Shoot 'em up	Shoot 'em up
Simulation	Simulation video game	Sports	Sports video game	Strategy	Strategy video game
TBS	Turn-based strategy	TBT	Turn-based tactics	Turn-based	Turn-based game
Vehicle sim	Vehicle simulation game	Vehicular combat	Vehicular combat game	Wargame	Computer wargame

Title	Year	Platforms	Genre	Description	Ref.
50 Mission Crush	1984	APPII, ATR, C64, DOS	TBS	Simulates the career of the crew of a B-17 bomber during World War II	
Advanced Dungeons & Dragons: Heroes of the Lance	1988	AMI, C64, CPC, DOS, MSX, NES, SMS, ATRST, ZX	RPG	Based on the Dungeons & Dragons Dragonlance campaign	
Advanced Dungeons & Dragons: Hillsfar	1989	AMI, C64, DOS, NES, ATRST	RPG	Fantasy; based on Advanced Dungeons & Dragons	
Al-Qadim: The Genie's Curse	1994	DOS	Action RPG	Al-Qadim campaign setting of Advanced Dungeons & Dragons	
Allied General	1996	DOS, MAC, PS1, WIN	TBS	Set in World War II	
Archon Ultra	1994	DOS	Strategy, Action	An updated remake of Archon: The Light and the Dark	
Arnhem	1985	AMI, CPC, DOS, ZX	Wargame	Simulates the Battle of Arnhem	
B-24	1987	APPII, C64, DOS	Vehicular combat (plane)	Set in World War II	
Baltic 1985: Corridor to Berlin	1984	APPII, C64	Strategy	A hypothetical WW III land combat in Eastern Germany	
Battle for Normandy	1982	APPII, ATR, C64, DOS, TRS80	Simulation	Simulates the famous World War II battle on D-Day	
The Battle of Shiloh	1981	APPII, ATR, TRS80	Simulation	Simulates the first grand battle of the American Civil War	
Battle of Antietam	1985	APPII, ATR, C64, DOS	Strategy	The eponymous brutal American Civil War battle	
The Battle of the Bulge: Tigers in the Snow	1981	APPII, ATR, C64, DOS, TRS80	Wargame	Simulates the Battle of the Bulge	
Battlecruiser	1987	APPII, ATR, C64	Vehicular combat (boat), Strategy	Naval warfare of World War II Atlantic theater; a sequel to Warship	
Battles of Napoleon	1988	APPII, C64, DOS	Wargame	Simulates some of the battles of the historical leader	
Blood Bowl	1995	DOS	TBS	An adaptation of the Games Workshop series Blood Bowl	
Bomb Alley	1981	APPII	Wargame	Covers the Mediterranean Theatre of World War II	
Broadsides	1983	APPII, ATR, C64			
Buccaneer	1997	WIN	Strategy, Action	Focuses on naval pirating	
Buck Rogers: Countdown to Doomsday	1990	AMI, C64, DOS, GEN	RPG	Set in the TSR Buck Rogers XXVC campaign setting	
Buck Rogers: Matrix Cubed	1992	DOS	RPG	Set in the TSR Buck Rogers XXVC campaign setting	
Carrier Strike: South Pacific	1992	DOS	Wargame	Set in the World War II Pacific theater	
Cartels & Cutthroat$	1981	APPII, C64, DOS	Business sim	Features finance, economics and supply and demand	
Champions of Krynn	1990	AMI, APPII, C64, DOS	RPG	The first in a three-part series of a Dragonlance Advanced Dungeons & Dragons "Gold Box" series	
Clash of Steel: Future Edition	1995	DOS	Grand strategy	Fixed many bugs in Clash of Steel: World War II, Europe 1939-45	
Clash of Steel: World War II, Europe 1939-45	1993	DOS	Grand strategy	Set in WWII Europe	
Close Combat IV: Battle of the Bulge	1999	WIN, MAC, XBOX	RTT	A World War II series focusing on platoon and company sized combat.	
Colonial Conquest	1985	APPII, ATR, ATRST, C64, PC98	Strategy	Colonization in the late 1800s and early 1900s	
Combat Leader	1983	ATR, C64	Wargame	Focuses on combat between tanks and mechanized infantry	
Computer Ambush	1981	APPII, ATR, C64	Simulation	A World War II squad level simulator.	
Computer Baseball	1981	AMI, APPII, ATR, C64, DOS, MAC	Sports (baseball)		
Computer Bismarck	1980	APPII, TRS80	Simulation	The Bismarck Chase during World War II	
Computer Conflict	1980	APPII	Wargame	Two imaginary scenarios taking place in Russia during the Cold War.	
Computer Quarterback	1981	APPII, ATR, C64	Sports (football)		
Conflict: Korea the First Year 1950-51	1992	AMI, DOS	Wargame	Focuses on the first year of the Korean War	
Conflict: Middle East	1991	AMI, DOS, ATRST	Wargame	Focuses on the Arab–Israeli conflict.	
The Cosmic Balance	1982	APPII, ATR, C64	Strategy, Simulation		
Cosmic Balance II	1982	APPII, ATR	4X	An early 4X game; strategic framework for The Cosmic Balance	
Curse of the Azure Bonds	1989	AMI, APPII, C64, DOS, MAC, PC98, ATRST	RPG	The second in a four-part series of Forgotten Realms Dungeons & Dragons Gold Box series.	
Cyber Empires	1992	AMI, DOS, ATRST	Strategy	World domination and robotic combat	
CyClones	1994	DOS	Action	Science-fiction	
Cytron Masters	1982	APPII, ATR	Strategy	A predecessor to the real time strategy game genre	
Dark Colony	1997	WIN, MAC	RTS	Science-fiction	
Dark Legions	1994	DOS	Action, Strategy	Similar to Archon and Archon Ultra	
The Dark Queen of Krynn	1992	AMI, DOS, MAC	RPG	Fantasy; the third in a three-part series of a Dragonlance Advanced Dungeons & Dragons "Gold Box" series	
Dark Sun: Shattered Lands	1993	DOS	RPG	Set in the Dungeons & Dragons Dark Sun campaign setting	
Dark Sun: Wake of the Ravager	1994	DOS	RPG		
Death Knights of Krynn	1991	AMI, C64, DOS, PC98	RPG	Part of the Dragonlance Advanced Dungeons & Dragons "Gold Box" series	
DeathKeep	1995	3DO, WIN	RPG	A Dungeons & Dragons game	
Demon's Winter	1988	AMI, APPII, C64, DOS, ATRST	RPG	Fantasy; a sequel to Shard of Spring	
Dragons of Flame	1989	AMI, C64, CPC, DOS, NES, ATRST, ZX	RPG	A Dragonlance sequel to Advanced Dungeons & Dragons: Heroes of the Lance	
DragonStrike	1990	AMI, C64, DOS, NES, X68K	RPG	Part of the Dragonlance Advanced Dungeons & Dragons "Gold Box" series	
Dungeon Hack	1993	DOS, PC98	RPG, Roguelike	Set in the Advanced Dungeons & Dragons world of Forgotten Realms	
Dungeon Master's Assistant Volume I	1988	DOS		An application to assist dungeon masters in constructing adventures for Advanced Dungeons & Dragons	
Dungeon Master's Assistant Volume II	1989	DOS		A follow-up application to Dungeon Master's Assistant Volume I; assists dungeon masters in constructing adventures for Advanced Dungeons & Dragons	
Eagles	1983	APPII, ATR, C64	Vehicular combat (plane)	Simulates WW I air combat	
Entomorph: Plague of the Darkfall	1995	MAC, WIN	Action RPG	Sequel to World of Aden: Thunderscape	
Epidemic!	1983	APPII, ATR	Strategy	A game about a global epidemic	
The Eternal Dagger	1987	APPII, ATR, C64	RPG	Fantasy; the sequel to Wizard's Crown	
Eye of the Beholder	1990	AMI, DOS, SCD, SNES, PC98	RPG	An Advanced Dungeons & Dragons fantasy game	
Eye of the Beholder II: The Legend of Darkmoon	1991	AMI, DOS, FMT, PC98	RPG	Based on Dungeons & Dragons, the second game in a series	
Eye of the Beholder III: Assault on Myth Drannor	1992	DOS, PC98	RPG	Based on Dungeons & Dragons, the third and final game in a series	
Fantasy Empires	1993	DOS	RPG	Set in Advanced Dungeons & Dragons world of Mystara.	
Fantasy General	1996	DOS	TBS, Wargame	Fantasy	
Field of Fire	1984	APPII, ATR, C64	TBS	Recreates the wartime fate of Easy Company, one of the companies of the 1st Infantry Division during World War II.	
Fighter Command: The Battle of Britain	1983	APPII, C64	TBS	Depicts the 1940 Battle of Britain	
Fighting Steel	1999	WIN	Wargame, Vehicular combat (boat)	Simulates Vehicular combat (boat) in the North Atlantic Naval warfare of WWII and World War II Pacific theater. Similar to the earlier Great Naval Battles series but with 3D rendering.	
Final Liberation: Warhammer Epic 40,000	1997	WIN	TBT	Set in the fictional Warhammer 40,000 universe	
First Over Germany	1989	C64, DOS	Wargame	Simulates the bomber offensive against Germany during World War II	
Flanker 2.0	1999	WIN			
Fortress	1983	APPII, ATR, C64, PC88, PC98	TBS		
Galactic Gladiators	1984	APPII, DOS			
Gary Grigsby's Pacific War	1992	DOS	Strategy	Simulates naval warfare of the World War II Pacific theater	
Gary Grigsby's War in Russia	1993	DOS	Strategy	Covers the war on Europe's Eastern Front from 1941-45	
Gateway to the Savage Frontier	1991	AMI, C64, DOS	RPG	A Dungeons & Dragons Gold Box series game	
Gemstone Healer	1986	APPII, C64	Action-adventure		
Gemstone Warrior	1984	APPII, ATR, C64, FM7, MAC, PC88, PC98			
Geopolitique 1990	1983	APPII, C64			
Germany 1985	1982	APPII, C64	Strategy	A hypothetical WW III land combat in Western Germany	
Gettysburg: The Turning Point	1986	AMI, APPII, ATR, C64, DOS	Strategy, Wargame	The Battle of Gettysburg	
Great Naval Battles: North Atlantic 1939-1943	1992	DOS	Vehicular combat (boat), Strategy	Naval warfare; the North Atlantic Naval warfare of WWII	
Great Naval Battles II: Guadalcanal 1942–1943	1993	DOS	Strategy, Vehicular combat (boat)	Naval warfare in the World War II Pacific theater	
Great Naval Battles III: Fury in the Pacific, 1941-1944	1994	DOS	Vehicular combat (boat), Strategy	Naval warfare	
Great Naval Battles Vol. IV: Burning Steel, 1939-1942	1995	DOS	Vehicular combat (boat), Strategy	Naval warfare	
Great Naval Battles 5	1996	DOS	Vehicular combat (boat), Strategy	Naval warfare	
Guadalcanal Campaign	1982	APPII	Turn-based, Wargame	Simulates the 1942 Battle of Guadalcanal during WWII	
History Line: 1914-1918	1993	AMI, DOS	TBT	Various battles of World War I	
Imperialism	1997	MAC, WIN	TBS	A game with the goal of building an empire	
Imperialism II: The Age of Exploration	1999	MAC, WIN	TBS	A game with the goal of building an empire, based during the eponymous age	
Imperium Galactum	1984	APPII, ATR, C64	4X, TBS	A space warfare game. Sequel to Cosmic Balance II	
Kampfgruppe	1985	AMI, APPII, ATR, C64, DOS	Strategy	Tank warfare of WWII	
Knights of The Desert	1983	APPII, ATR, C64, DOS, TRS80	Wargame, Simulation	An operational level simulation of the campaigns in Egypt and Libya from 1941-43. The first computer wargame to feature stacked units and detailed logistics.	
A Line in the Sand	1992	DOS		A translation of the original A Line in the Sand board game by TSR	
Luftwaffe Commander	1999	WIN	Simulation	A single-player and multiplayer simulation, and the player enters a career as a Luftwaffe pilot over Spain, France, Britain, Russian Front and the Western Front.	
Mech Brigade	1985	APPII, ATR, C64, DOS			
Medieval Lords: Soldier Kings of Europe	1991	C64, DOS	Strategy, Simulation	A medieval strategy simulator that covers 500 years of European history, starting in 1028 AD.	
Menzoberranzan	1994	DOS, PC98	RPG	Fantasy; based on Advanced Dungeons & Dragons world of Forgotten Realms	
Nam	1986	DOS, WIN, C64			
Napoleon's Campaigns: 1813 & 1815	1981	APPII		A computer-assisted board game.	
Necrodome	1996	WIN	Action, Vehicular combat		
Neverwinter Nights	1991	DOS	MMORPG	The first graphical MMORPG	
No Greater Glory: The American Civil War	1991	AMI, DOS, MAC	Strategy	The American Civil War	
North Atlantic '86	1983	APPII			
Norway 1985	1985	APPII, C64	Strategy	Hypothetical WW III land combat in Norway	
Operation Apocalypse	1981	APPII	TBS, Wargame	Set during World War II.	
Operation Market Garden	1985	APPII, ATR, C64, DOS	TBS, Wargame	Set during World War II. Scenarios include the Airborne forces.	
Overrun!	1989	AMI, C64			
Pacific General	1997	WIN	Wargame	Depicts famous battles of the World War II Pacific campaigns	
Panzer Commander	1998	WIN	Vehicle sim (tank), Wargame	Set in World War II	
Panzer General	1994	3DO, DOS, MAC, PS1, WIN	Wargame	Set in World War II	
Panzer General II	1997	WIN	TBS, Wargame	Set during World War II	
Panzer General 3D Assault	1999	WIN	TBS, Wargame	A 3D rendered game set during World War II on the Western Front.	
Panzer General III: Scorched Earth	2000	WIN	TBS, Wargame	A 3D rendered game set during World War II on the Eastern Front.	
Panzer Grenadier	1985	APPII, ATR, C64			
Panzer Strike	1987	APPII, C64	Strategy	Tank warfare of WWII	
People's General	1998	WIN	TBS, Wargame	Focuses on early 21st century warfare in Asia. Also known as Dynasty General	
Phantasie	1985	AMI, APPII, ATR, C64, DOS, FM7, MSX, PC88, PC98, ATRST, X1	RPG	Fantasy; the first in a series.	
Phantasie II	1986	APPII, ATR, C64, FM7, PC88, PC98, ATRST, X1	RPG	Fantasy; a sequel to Phantasie, the second installment in the series.	
Phantasie III: Wrath of Nikademus	1987	AMI, APPII, C64, DOS, FM7, PC88, PC98, ATRST, X1, X68K	RPG	Fantasy; the third installment in the Phantasie series	
Pool of Radiance	1988	AMI, APPII, C64, DOS, MAC, NES, PC98	RPG	Fantasy; based on Dungeons & Dragons; the first of the "Gold Box" D&D video games.	
Pools of Darkness	1991	AMI, DOS, MAC, PC98	RPG	The 4th in the four-part Forgotten Realms Dungeons & Dragons Gold Box series	
President Elect	1981	APPII, C64, DOS, ATRST	Simulation	A simulation of a presidential campaign from Labor Day to election night.	
President Elect: 1988 Edition	1987	APPII, C64, DOS, ATRST	Simulation	A sequel to President Elect, a simulation of a presidential campaign from Labor Day to election night.	
Professional Tour Golf	1983	APPII, C64	Sports (golf)		
Prophecy of the Shadow	1992	DOS	RPG	Fantasy	
Queen of Hearts	1983	APPII	Simulation		
Questron	1984	AMI, APPII, ATR, C64,	RPG	Fantasy	
Questron II	1988	AMI, APPII, APPGS, C64, DOS, ATRST	RPG	Fantasy ; sequel to Questron	
Ravenloft: Strahd's Possession	1994	DOS, FMT	RPG	Fantasy; based on Advanced Dungeons & Dragons; set in the domain of Barovia	
Ravenloft: Stone Prophet	1995	DOS	RPG	Fantasy; a Dungeons & Dragons game, sequel to Ravenloft: Strahd's Possession	
RDF 1985	1983	APPII, C64	Strategy	Hypothetical WW III land combat in the Middle East	
Reach for the Stars	2000	WIN			
Realms of Darkness	1986	APPII, C64	RPG	Fantasy	
Rebel Charge at Chickamauga	1985	AMI, APPII, ATR, C64, DOS			
Red Lightning	1989	AMI, DOS, ATRST	Wargame	A hypothetical Cold War era Soviet invasion of western Europe	
Reforger '88	1984	APPII, ATR	Strategy	A hypothetical conflict between NATO forces and The Warsaw Pact in 1988	
Renegade: The Battle for Jacob's Star	1995	DOS	Vehicle sim (spaceship), Vehicular combat		
Renegade Legion: Interceptor	1990	AMI, DOS		A direct translation of the original board game	
Rings of Zilfin	1986	APPII, C64, DOS, ATRST	RPG	Fantasy	
The Road to Gettysburg	1982	APPII	Turn-based, Wargame	Set during American Civil War. A computer-assisted board game.	
Roadwar 2000	1986	AMI, APPII, APPGS, C64, DOS, PC88, PC98, ATRST	TBS	Post-apocalyptic	
Roadwar Europa	1987	AMI, APPII, C64, DOS, ATRST	TBS	Post-apocalyptic sequel to the 1986 Roadwar 2000.	
S. E. U. I. S.	1982	APPII	Shoot 'em up	Space	
Second Front: Germany Turns East	1990	AMI, DOS	Strategy	Set in the Eastern Front of WWII	
Secret of the Silver Blades	1990	AMI, C64, DOS, MAC, PC98	RPG	An Advanced Dungeons & Dragons fantasy game, part of the Forgotten Realms campaign setting	
Shadow Sorcerer	1991	AMI, DOS, ATRST	RPG	An Advanced Dungeons & Dragons fantasy game; sequel to Heroes of the Lance	
Shard of Spring	1986	APPII, C64, DOS	RPG	Fantasy	
The Shattered Alliance	1981	APPII, ATR	Wargame	Fantasy	
Shiloh: Grant's Trial in The West	1985	APPII, ATR, C64, DOS			
Silent Hunter	1996	DOS	Vehicular combat (submarine)	Set in World War II	
Silent Hunter II	2001	WIN	Vehicular combat (submarine)	Set in World War II	
Six-Gun Shootout	1985	APPII, ATR, C64			
Skyrealms of Jorune: Alien Logic	1994	DOS	RPG	Science-fiction	
Soldiers at War	1998	WIN	TBT	Set in World War II	
Sons of Liberty	1988	APPII, ATR, C64, DOS	Strategy	Simulates battles of the American Revolutionary War	
Southern Command	1981	APPII	Simulation	Simulates a specific battle of the 1967 Arab–Israeli war. The player controls the Israeli side, the computer is the Arab side.	
Spelljammer: Pirates of Realmspace	1992	DOS	RPG	A science-fiction/fantasy game using Advanced Dungeons & Dragons Second Edition, Spelljammer rules	
Star Command	1988	AMI, DOS, ATRST	Strategy	A science fiction game based on the board game of the same name	
Star General	1996	DOS, WIN	Strategy, Wargame	Science-fiction	
Steel Panthers	1995	DOS	TBT, Wargame	First in the series	
Steel Panthers II: Modern Battles	1996	DOS	TBT, Wargame	Second in the series	
Steel Panthers III	1997	DOS, WIN	TBT, Wargame	A game with World War II and modern warfare settings	
Stellar Crusade	1988	AMI, DOS, ATRST	Strategy	Science fiction interstellar conquest	
Storm Across Europe	1989	AMI, C64, DOS, ATRST	Wargame	A wargame of World War II in Europe on a grand strategic scale between 1939 and 1945	
Stronghold	1993	DOS, FMT, PC98	RTS		
Su-27 Flanker	1996	DOS, WIN	Vehicle sim (plane), Vehicular combat		
The Summoning	1992	DOS, PC98	RPG	Fantasy; the sequel to DarkSpyre	
Sword of Aragon	1989	AMI, DOS	Wargame	Fantasy; set in a fictional land of Aragon	
Tony La Russa Baseball (1991-1993)	1991	GEN	Sports (baseball)		
Tony La Russa Baseball II	1993	DOS	Sports (baseball)		
Torpedo Fire	1981	APPII			
Treasures of the Savage Frontier	1992	AMI, DOS	RPG	A Gold Box Dungeons & Dragons game	
Typhoon of Steel	1988	AMI, APPII, C64, DOS	Strategy	Tank warfare of WWII; a sequel to Panzer Strike	
Unlimited Adventures	1993	DOS, MAC	RPG		
Veil of Darkness	1993	DOS, FMT, PC98	Horror, Action-adventure		
War of the Lance	1989	APPII, C64, DOS	RPG	Fantasy; based in the Dungeons & Dragons Dragonlance campaign setting	
War Wind	1996	WIN	RTS		
War Wind II: Human Onslaught	1997	WIN	RTS		
Wargame Construction Set	1986	AMI, ATR, C64, DOS, ATRST		A "construction set" application that let the user build wargame scenarios and play them	
Wargame Construction Set II: Tanks!	1994	DOS		A "construction set" application that let the user build wargame scenarios and play them, this one featuring armored combat	
Wargame Construction Set III: Age of Rifles 1846–1905	1996	DOS		A "construction set" application that let the user build wargame scenarios and play them, this one featuring the eponymous years	
Warhammer 40,000: Chaos Gate	1998	WIN	TBS, Wargame	Set in the Warhammer 40,000 universe	
Warhammer 40,000: Rites of War	1999	WIN			
Warlords Battlecry	1999	WIN			
The Warp Factor	1982	APPII, DOS	Simulation	Space combat	
Warship	1986	APPII, ATR, C64, DOS, ATRST	Wargame	Set in the World War II Pacific theater	
Waterloo	1990	AMI, Arc, DOS, ATRST	Strategy	Napoleon's Battle of Waterloo	
Western Front: The Liberation of Europe 1944-1945	1991	DOS	Grand strategy	Set in the Western and Italian fronts of WWII	
Wizard's Crown	1985	APPII, ATR, C64, DOS, ATRST	RPG	Fantasy	
World of Aden: Thunderscape	1995	DOS	RPG	Swords & sorcery	
