= RapidFire =

RapidFire is a game line published by SSI beginning in 1982.

== Development ==
RapidFire was a game line launched by Strategic Simulations Inc. (SSI) in 1982 to appeal to players who preferred faster-paced, more accessible games compared to SSI's traditional strategic wargames. The series emphasized speed and ease of play, incorporating real-time and action-oriented elements, according to company president Joel Billings. It quickly became a success, expanding SSI's reputation beyond strategy games and attracting talented developers, including Dani Bunten Berry, Keith Brors, and Chuck Kroegel, who later became the company's vice president of research and development.

RapidFire was a short-lived game line. Unlike SSI's internally developed titles, RapidFire games were published through third-party developers. The branding lasted only a few titles before being discontinued by 1984. Despite its brief existence, RapidFire marked an important shift in SSI's approach to game publishing.

== Series ==
The first four games in the series in 1982 were:

- Cytron Masters
- The Cosmic Balance
- Galactic Gladiators
- S. E. U. I. S.

Games added later to the series in 1983 included:

- Combat Leader
- Cosmic Balance II
- Epidemic!
- Fortress
- Galactic Adventures

== Reception ==
Chris Smith reviewed the first four games in SSI's RapidFire Line in The Space Gamer No. 59. Smith commented that " RapidFire is a game line that deserves any award it can be nominated for. It is the best line of computer games I've ever seen, and the programs rate high on an individual basis also."
