= Index of DOS games (R) =

This is an index of DOS games.

This list has been split into multiple pages. Please use the Table of Contents to browse it.

Title	Released	Developer(s)	Publisher(s)
Race Drivin'	1992	Walking Circles	Domark
Rack 'Em	1988	Artech Digital Entertainment	Accolade
Radix: Beyond the Void	1995	Union Logic	Epic MegaGames
Rad Warrior	1986	Palace Software	Palace Software
Raiden	1990	Seibu Kaihatsu	Acer
Rama	1996	Sierra Entertainment	Sierra Entertainment
Rambo: First Blood Part II	1985	Angelsoft	Mindscape
Rambo III	1989	Banana Development Corporation	Taito
Rampage	1986	Monarch Development	Activision
Rampart	1990	Bitsmasters	Electronic Arts
Raptor: Call of the Shadows	1994	Cygnus Studios	Apogee Software
Rastan	1987	Novalogic	Taito
Rasterscan	1987	Binary Design	Mastertronic
Ravenloft: Stone Prophet	1995	DreamForge Intertainment	Strategic Simulations
Ravenloft: Strahd's Possession	1994	DreamForge Intertainment	Strategic Simulations
The Raven Project	1995	Cryo Interactive	Mindscape
Rayman	1996	Ubisoft	SoftKey
Reach for the Skies	1993	Rowan Software	Virgin Games
Reach for the Stars	1983	Strategic Studies Group	Strategic Studies Group
Reader Rabbit and the Fabulous Word Factory	1987	The Learning Company	The Learning Company
Reader Rabbit 1	1991	The Learning Company	The Learning Company
Reader Rabbit 2	1991	The Learning Company	The Learning Company
Reader Rabbit 3	1993	The Learning Company	The Learning Company
Reader Rabbit's Ready for Letters	1992	The Learning Company	The Learning Company
Realms	1991	Graftgold	Virgin Interactive
Realms of Arkania: Blade of Destiny	1993-06	Attic Entertainment Software	Sir-Tech/U.S. Gold
Realms of Arkania: Star Trail	1994-10	Attic Entertainment Software	Sir-Tech/U.S. Gold
Realms of Arkania: Shadows over Riva	1997	Attic Entertainment Software	Sir-Tech/U.S. Gold
Realms of Chaos	1995	Apogee Software	Apogee Software
Realms of the Haunting	1997	Gremlin Interactive	Gremlin Interactive
Rebel Charge at Chickamauga	1987	Strategic Simulations	Strategic Simulations
Red Babe	1994	The DaRK CaVErN Productions	The DaRK CaVErN Productions
Red Baron	1990	Dynamix	Sierra Entertainment
Red Lightning	1989	Strategic Simulations	Strategic Simulations
Redneck Rampage	1997	Xatrix Entertainment	Interplay Entertainment
Redneck Rampage Rides Again: Arkansas	1998	Xatrix Entertainment	Interplay Entertainment
Red Storm Rising	1989	MicroProse	MicroProse
Relentless: Twinsen's Adventure	1994	Adeline Software	Activision
Re-Loaded	1996	Gremlin Interactive	Interplay Entertainment
Remote Control	1989	Softie, Inc.	Hi-Tech Expressions
Renegade	1986	Banana Development Corporation	Taito
Renegade Legion: Interceptor	1990	Strategic Simulations	Strategic Simulations
Renegade: The Battle for Jacob's Star	1995	Midnight Software	Strategic Simulations
Rescue at Rigel	1983	Epyx	Epyx
Rescue Rover	1991	id Software	Softdisk
Rescue Rover 2	1991	id Software	Softdisk
Resolution 101	1990	Astral Software	Millennium Interactive
Retribution	1994	Astros Productions	Gremlin Interactive
Retro City Rampage 486	2015	Vblank Entertainment	Vblank entertainment
Return of the Phantom	1993	MicroProse	MicroProse
Return to Kroz	1990	Scott Miller	Apogee Software
Return to Zork	1993	Activision	Infocom
Reunion	1994	Amnesty Design	Merit Studios
Reversi	1985	Microsoft	Microsoft
Revolution X	1996	Midway Games	Acclaim Entertainment
Rex Nebular and the Cosmic Gender Bender	1992	Microprose	Microprose
Richard Scarry's Busytown	1993	Novotrade	Simon & Schuster
Rick Dangerous	1989	Core Design	Rainbird Software
Rick Dangerous II	1990	Core Design	Micro Style
Rings of Medusa	1990	Starbyte Software	Starbyte Software
Ringworld: Revenge of the Patriarch	1992	Tsunami Media	Tsunami Media
Ripley's Believe It or Not!: The Riddle of Master Lu	1995	Sanctuary Woods	Sanctuary Woods
Ripper	1996	Take-Two Interactive	Take-Two Interactive
Rise 2: Resurrection	1996	Mirage Software	Acclaim Entertainment
Rise of the Dragon	1990	Dynamix	Sierra On-line
Rise of the Robots	1994	Mirage Software	Time Warner Interactive
Rise of the Robots: The Director's Cut	1994	Mirage Software	Mirage Software
Rise of the Triad	1995	Apogee Software	Apogee Software
Risk	1986	Panther Programs	
Risky Woods	1992	Dinamic Multimedia	Electronic Arts
Roadwar 2000	1986	Strategic Simulations, Westwood Studios	Strategic Simulations
Roadwar Europa	1987	Strategic Simulations	Strategic Simulations
Robinson's Requiem	1994	Silmarils	Silmarils
RoboCop	1988	Ocean Software	Ocean Software, Data East
Robocop 3	1993	Digital Image Design	Ocean Software
RoboSport	1991	Maxis	Maxis
Robot Odyssey	1984	Mike Wallace, Dr. Leslie Grimm	The Learning Company
Robot Rascals	1986	Ozark Softscape	Electronic Arts
Robot Tank	1988	Donald Laabs	
Robotron: 2084	1983	Vid Kidz	Atarisoft
Rock-A-Doodle Computerized Coloring Book, The	1992	Capstone Software	IntraCorp
Rocketeer, The	1991	NovaLogic	Walt Disney Computer Software
Rocket Ranger	1989	Cinemaware	Cinemaware
Rockford	1988	Arcadia Systems	Mastertronic
Rock 'n Roll	1989	Rainbow Arts	Rainbow Arts
Rogue: The Adventure Game	1984	Artificial Intelligence Design	Epyx
Rollerblade Racer	1993	Tahoe Software Productions	Hi-Tech Expressions
Rollin	1995	Ticsoft	Ticsoft
Rollo And The Brush Bros	1983	Windmill Software	Windmill Software
Romance of the Three Kingdoms	1989	Koei	Koei
Romance of the Three Kingdoms II	1989	Koei	Koei
Romance of the Three Kingdoms III: Dragon of Destiny	1992	Koei	Koei
Romance of the Three Kingdoms IV: Wall of Fire	1994	Koei/Inis	Koei
Romance of the Three Kingdoms V	1995	Koei	Koei
Rome: Pathway to Power	1993	Firstlight	Maxis
Rugby World Cup 95	1995	Creative Assembly	Electronic Arts
Rush'n Attack	1985	Banana Development Corporation	Konami
