= Index of DOS games (O) =

This is an index of DOS games.

This list has been split into multiple pages. Please use the Table of Contents to browse it.

Title	Released	Developer(s)	Publisher(s)
Obitus	1991	Psygnosis	Psygnosis
Objection!	1992	TransMedia Productions, Inc.	TransMedia Productions, Inc.
Obliterator	1988	Psygnosis	Psygnosis
Ocean Ranger	1988	Activision	Activision
Ogre	1986	Origin Systems	Origin Systems
Oh No! More Lemmings	1991	DMA Design	Psygnosis
Oil Barons	1983	Epyx	Epyx
Oil's Well	1984	Sierra On-Line	Sierra On-Line
Olympic Games: Atlanta 1996	1996	Tiertex	U.S. Gold
Omega	1989	Origin Systems	Origin Systems
Once Upon A Forest	1995	Sanctuary Woods	Sanctuary Woods
One Must Fall: 2097	1994	Diversions Entertainment	Epic MegaGames
One on One: Dr. J vs. Larry Bird	1983	Electronic Arts	Electronic Arts
On the Ball	1993	Ascon	Ascon
Oo-topos	1986	Polarware	Polarware
OpenTTD	2004	OpenTTD Team	OpenTTD Team
Operation Body Count	1994	Capstone Software	Capstone Software
Operation: Cleanstreets	1988	Silmarils	Broderbund
Operation Crusader	1994	Atomic Games	Avalon Hill
Operation Europe: Path to Victory	1994	KOEI	KOEI
Operation Market Garden: Drive on Arnhem, September 1944	1985	Strategic Simulations	Strategic Simulations
Operation Neptune	1991	The Learning Company	The Learning Company
Operation Stealth	1990	Delphine Software	Interplay Entertainment, U.S. Gold
Operation Wolf	1989	Banana Development Corporation	Taito
Orbiter	1986	Spectrum Holobyte	Spectrum Holobyte
Oregon Trail: Classic Edition, The	1990	MECC	MECC
Orion Burger	1996	Sanctuary Woods	Eidos Interactive
Orion Conspiracy, The	1995	Divide By Zero	Domark
Oscar	1994	Flair Software	Flair Software
Outland	1992	Rickers Software	
Out of the Park	1999	Out of the Park Developments	Out of the Park Developments
Out Run	1989	Unlimited Software	Sega
Overdrive	1984	Peter Johnson	Superior Software
Overkill	1992	Tech-Noir	Epic MegaGames
Overlord	1994	Rowan Software	Virgin Interactive
Oxyd, Oxyd Extra, Oxyd Magnum	1990	Dongleware Verlags	Dongleware Verlags
