= Renegade 2 =

Renegade 2 may refer to

- Target: Renegade, a 1988 computer game released by Ocean
- Renegade II: Return to Jacob's Star, a computer game planned for 1996 and eventually cancelled
- Command & Conquer: Renegade 2, a computer game by Westwood Studios cancelled in 2003
- Renegade II (plane), one of the family of Canadian Murphy Renegade planes
