= Circus Imperium =

1988 board game

- Publishers: FASA
- Publication: 1988

Circus Imperium is a light-hearted science fiction chariot racing board game published in 1988 by FASA.

== Description ==
Circus Imperium is a game based loosely on Avalon Hill's Circus Maximus in which players are charioteers of the future, controlling anti-grav chariots pulled by carnivorous beasts. The object of the game is to defeat the other racers by either crossing the finish line first, or more typically by knocking them out of the race or getting them eaten by the monsters. Outcomes of player actions are often random and unpredictable, and players can get points for eliciting laughs or the loudest cheers from other gamers.

== Publication history ==
In the 1980s, FASA published a series of Renegade Legion board games set in the 69th century. The fifth in the series was Circus Imperium, designed by L. Ross Babcock, III, Sam Lewis, and Jordan Weisman, and published as a boxed set by FASA in 1988. Unlike previous games in the series, this tongue-in-cheek game was played strictly for laughs. Ral Partha produced a series of lead figures for the game, including chariots, senators and imperial guards.

== Reception ==
Alan R. Moon reviewed Circus Imperium for Games International magazine, and gave it 3 stars out of 5, and stated that "The game is quicker than Circus Maximus because there are fewer rules and special situations, there is generally less to think about, and players are not allowed to interrupt their movement to attack. This is a big plus, as the last few Circus Maximus games I played in took forever."

Neal Roger Tringham called it "a comparatively light-hearted board game", not in keeping with the more serious tone of other releases in the Renegade Legion line of tabletop games.

GM magazine praised the inclusion of some game components that were lacking in Circus Maximus – large track, cardboard buildings, tokens – while noting their flimsiness. Circus Imperium was recommended for its replayability.
