= The Battle of Shiloh (video game) =

1981 video game

- Publisher: Strategic Simulations
- Platforms: Apple II, Atari 8-bit, TRS-80
- Release: 1981
- Genre: Computer wargame

The Battle of Shiloh is a 1981 computer wargame published by Strategic Simulations. It is one of the first Civil War strategy computer games, and was the first Strategic Simulations game available on the TRS-80. Intended as an introductory war game (along with Tigers in the Snow), it was available on the Commodore 64, Apple II, and Atari 8-bit computers, TRS-80, and IBM PC, and was originally developed by David Landry and Chuck Kroegel through their studio "Tactical Design Group".

== Gameplay ==
The Battle of Shiloh is a game in which the player can reenact the Battle of Shiloh. Playing either against the computer or another player, players employ infantry and artillery units to compete for control of the Pittsburg Landing. Although based on the historical battle, players can modify the strengths of the respective Confederate and Union armies, and the game takes into account the impact of terrain. Players can also modify the level of risk and strategy for both the defender and attacker, and as the original battle involved an element of surprise, the first four moves of the game are weighted towards the Confederates. The game can also be set for two computer players, allowing for some "valuable lessons for raw recruits to computer war gaming".

== Reception ==
Bob Proctor reviewed the game for Computer Gaming World, and stated that "This is a very well designed product. Although it will take at least 2 hours to play the first day (and as much as 5 hours for both days), there are no periods of inactivity longer than 5 seconds or so. The game is absorbing; you are constantly making decisions and watching for weaknesses in the enemy." The magazine in 1987 wrote that "Shiloh could have gone either way and the same delicate balance exists in this game".

Robert Fox of Antic raised concerns regarding the lack of sound, the "murky" graphics, and the randomised outcomes of battles, but ROM Magazine found the graphics to be good, and commenting on the Apple II version of the game, reviewers Mike Shadick and Sallie Stephenson described the graphics on that platform as outstanding. In regard to the computer player, Proctor criticised choices made to improve the game balance, as the computer was given extra mobility to make up for shortcomings in the AI, and concluded that it was a game better played against another person – a concern also reflected in Laurance Miller's review for Micro Adventurer. Similarly, ROM magazine felt that the computer moves were too slow, even though they appreciated the game's flexibility and the clear theme. Reviewing the game for The Minneapolis Star, Dale Archibald found it easy to play and described it as a "thoughtful recreation of a battle that could have changed the course of this country's history".
