= Storm Across Europe =

1989 video game

- Developer(s): Strategic Simulations
- Publisher(s): Strategic Simulations
- Designer(s): Dan Cermak
- Platform(s): Commodore 64 (original); Amiga, MS-DOS
- Release: 1989 (C64); 1990 (Amiga, PC)
- Genre(s): Turn-based strategy
- Mode(s): single-player, multiplayer (hot-seat)

Storm Across Europe is a grand strategy video game written by Dan Cermak and released for the Commodore 64 in 1989 by Strategic Simulations. Versions for the Amiga and MS-DOS followed in 1990. The game covers World War II in Europe on a grand strategic scale between 1939 and 1945.

== Gameplay ==
Three major powers are playable: Germany (Axis), the Allies and the Soviet Union. However, Germany cannot be played by the computer. The player is in charge of their chosen major power and its land, air and naval forces, as well as controlling production and research of military equipment.

The map covers Europe, North Africa and Middle East and the Baltic, North Sea, eastern Atlantic, Mediterranean, Black Sea and Persian Gulf. The map covers 224 areas and 37 different countries. Each area has different terrain (affecting combat), and possible manpower, raw materials and industry (needed for production and research).

== Reception ==
Compute! stated that the Commodore 64 version of Storm Across Europe was "one of the best games of the year", approving of the game's strategic emphasis. Computer Gaming World gave the game three stars out of five. The magazine stated that despite the "8-bit" graphics and user interface, Storm Across Europe might appeal to fans of Colonial Conquest and those looking for a strategy game they could complete relatively quickly; Clash of Steel, however, "makes this embarrassingly unplayable".
