= Legionnaire (role-playing game) =

Tabletop role-playing game

Legionnaire is a role-playing game published by FASA in 1990.

== Description ==
Legionnaire is a standalone role-playing game based on the Renegade Legion space opera strategy board games. It expanded the original Renegade Legion setting with three new alien races: the Menelvagoreans, the Vauvusar, and the Zog. While designed primarily as a stand-alone game, it could be integrated into the board games in the series, with stat conversions and guidelines for players who wished to do so.

== Publication history ==
Shannon Appelcline said that "Though some thought the Renegade Legion universe was more sophisticated than Battletech's world of giant robots, it nonetheless did not have the staying power of its older brother. After FASA pushed back into the RPG business with a one-short roleplaying game for the universe, Legionnaire (1990), the line began to fade, finally sputtering out in 1993."
