= Roadwar Europa =

1987 video game

- Developers: Strategic Simulations; Westwood Associates (Amiga, ST, C64)
- Publisher: Strategic Simulations
- Designer: Jeffrey Johnson
- Platforms: Amiga, Apple II, Apple IIGS, Atari ST, Commodore 64, MS-DOS
- Release: 1987
- Genre: Turn-based strategy
- Mode: Single-player

Roadwar Europa is a video game designed by Jeffrey Johnson, developed by George MacDonald, and published in 1987 by Strategic Simulations. The game was released for Amiga, Apple II, Atari ST, Commodore 64, and MS-DOS. It is a sequel to the 1986 video game Roadwar 2000 also published by Strategic Simulations.

== Gameplay ==
Roadwar Europa is a game in which the player leads of a band of road warriors who drive across Europe to find atom bombs armed by terrorists.

== Reception ==
Reception

Review score
Publication	Score
Computer Gaming World	2.5/5

SSI sold 18,765 copies of Roadwar Europa in North America.

Antic in 1988 stated "I loved the original version of this game and I love this sequel," citing its "simple and hypnotic" game play, user interface with both simple and complex options, and lack of copy protection. In the 1992 and 1994 surveys Computer Gaming World gave the title two-plus stars of five, calling it "Quite entertaining when originally released, but its graphics have rendered it obsolescent".

Robbie Robberson reviewed Roadwar Europa in Space Gamer/Fantasy Gamer No. 81. Robberson commented that "In short, the Roadwar series is an example of a good idea that is short circuited by its components. If Strategic Simulations, Inc. can release these games with a better and quicker combat routine, or better yet, reduce the incidence of combat, these games would be a required addition to every serious computer gamer's library. As of now, they are simply entertaining in the short run, and tedious in the long."
