= Galactic Adventures =

1982 video game

- Publisher: Strategic Simulations
- Platforms: Apple II, Atari 8-bit
- Release: NA: 1982
- Genre: Role-playing

Galactic Adventures is a role-playing video game published in 1982 by Strategic Simulations for the Apple II and Atari 8-bit computers.

== Gameplay ==
Galactic Adventures is an adventure game using the graphics and combat system from Galactic Gladiators, and building a team of adventurers.

== Reception ==
David Long reviewed the game for Computer Gaming World, and stated that "SSI has done a superb job on this sequel to GG. Most role playing games have a rather abstract combat resolution sequence. GA has a complete game within a game for combat resolution, along with as complicated a series of adventures as you could want."

Norman J. Banduch reviewed Galactic Adventures in Space Gamer No. 66. Banduch commented that "Galactic Adventures is a very fine game. It has excellent graphics, a wealth of options, and the game works. The price is high, but the cost per hour becomes very low. I found that Galactic Adventures is not a game that gets old fast. It is an excellent addition to almost any adventure gamer's computer library."
