= Conflict: Korea – The First Year 1950–51 =

1992 video game

Conflict: Korea the First Year 1950-51
- Developer: Strategic Simulations, Inc.
- Publisher: Strategic Simulations, Inc.
- Platforms: Amiga; MS-DOS
- Release: 1992
- Genres: Simulation; Strategy

Conflict: Korea – The First Year 1950–51 is a 1992 video game published by Strategic Simulations.

== Gameplay ==
Conflict: Korea is a game in which the first year of the Korean War is simulated. The game map is overlaid with hexagons which allow the player to measure movement. Units are controlled by mouse, and the game simulated three historical battles and one hypothetical modern-day conflict.

== Reception ==
Reception

Review scores
Publication	Score
Amiga Action	56%
Computer Gaming World	2.5/5

Richard Savage reviewed the game for Computer Gaming World, and stated that "I just hope that, unlike the real Korean conflict, this game doesn't become the 'Forgotten game.' Conflict: Korea deserves better fate than it has received so far. Check it out."

Brad Burton for Amiga Action said that this game has "the same wargame format as other SSI games, the same control method and graphics. It really is time for change."

The reviewer from Amiga Format lamented that eventually there would be no more wars to base strategy games on, but "SSI still manage to dig up new battles".
