= Chuck Kroegel =

American video game designer (born 1952)

- Born: 1952 (age 73–74); Oakland, California
- Occupation: Video game developer

Chuck Kroegel (born 1952 in Oakland, California) is an American video game designer. He was an executive for many years with Strategic Simulations (SSI), and played a role in developing their position as an industry leader in computer wargames and role-playing video games. His career in the video game industry now spans over 30 years.

== Career ==
In the 1970s Kroegel was a school teacher and later an HR manager who enjoyed playing computer war games. He had played games on his TRS-80 computer that had been designed by David Landry and the two corresponded. They decided to found a development studio, Tactical Design Group. Their first two games, The Battle of Shiloh and The Battle of the Bulge: Tigers in the Snow, were published by SSI in 1981. TDG created twelve SSI games from 1981 through 1988, the last being Battles of Napoleon.

In 1983 Kroegel left TDG to join SSI, which continued to publish TDG's games. In 1986 he designed Gettysburg: The Turning Point for TDG, although he was an employee of SSI. He ultimately became VP of Product Development for SSI, and later served as President of the company. Kroegel played a role in the creation of the Gold Box Dungeons & Dragons games, and of the first graphical MMORPG, Neverwinter Nights on AOL, and the Panzer General series.

When SSI was acquired by The Software Toolworks (which quickly thereafter became Mindscape) in 1994, Kroegel stayed on and later served as Executive VP and General Manager of the Mindscape Entertainment Division. He also stayed through a series of acquisitions that was to follow: Mindscape by The Learning Company (which also acquired Broderbund), The Learning Company by Mattel, and the spin-off by Mattel to Gores (which occurred after he had left).

Upon leaving SSI in 2000, Kroegel joined EA-owned Westwood Studios, where he was the chief operating officer. In 2002 he joined Strategy First in Montreal, Canada working as their VP of Product Development. In April 2003 he joined Petroglyph to assist in creating that studio.

Chuck Kroegel is currently CEO of Las Vegas game developer Petroglyph Games since April 2003. He has been very involved with all the titles developed at Petroglyph, Star Wars: Empire at War (LUCASARTS), Universe at War (SEGA), Panzer General on Xbox live arcade (UBISOFT), Mytheon (TRUEGAMES), and Guardians of Graxia (Petroglyph), End of Nations (TRIONWORLDS), and Rise of Immortals (Petroglyph). He has also been involved in the design and development of four boardgames published by Petroglyph; Panzer General: Russian Assault, Panzer General: Allied Assault, Guardians of Graxia, and Heroes of Graxia.
