= Medieval Lords: Soldier Kings of Europe =

1991 video game

- Developer: Strategic Simulations
- Publisher: Strategic Simulations
- Designer: Martin C. Campion
- Platforms: Commodore 64, MS-DOS
- Release: 1991
- Genre: Turn-based strategy

Medieval Lords: Soldier Kings of Europe is a political/war strategy and tactics simulator game released in 1991 by Strategic Simulations.

== Gameplay ==
Medieval Lords: Soldier Kings of Europe is a game in which players manage a medieval European kingdom.

The game takes place in medieval times (starting in 1028 AD) and continues for up to 500 years (or 100 turns). Taking on the role of an immortal advisor to such figures as a king, sultan, or other leader, players work to conquer and form alliances with other regions and manage major events like the plague, religious uprisings, and failing economies. The game covers Europe, North Africa, and the Middle East.

== Development ==
Computer Gaming World included some of the formulae used in the game logic, provided by the game's designer Martin Campion.

== Reception ==
Chuck Moss reviewed the game for Computer Gaming World, and stated that "Medieval Lords is an entertaining and challenging computer game, despite — or, perhaps, because of — its limitations."

Janice Greaves for Run said that "Medieval Lords is well suited to solitaire, multi-player and classroom use."

Jim Trunzo reviewed Medieval Lords: Soldier Kings of Europe in White Wolf #29 (Oct./Nov., 1991), rating it a 3 out of 5 and stated that "For those who are deep thinkers and love to play simulations that are grand in scale, Medieval Lords will challenge you game after game. There's great satisfaction in watching the map of Europe turn into your empire's color block by block."
