= Imperium Galactum =

1984 strategy video game

- Publisher(s): Strategic Simulations
- Designer(s): Paul Murray
- Platform(s): Apple II, Atari 8-bit, Commodore 64
- Release: 1984
- Genre(s): Turn-based strategy, 4X

Imperium Galactum is a 1984 video game designed by Paul Murray and published by Strategic Simulations.

== Gameplay ==
Gameplay screenshot (Atari 8-bit)

Imperium Galactum is a game in which the player must expand an empire to achieve the largest population base in the star cluster. This goal can be achieved by overseeing the cultivation of land, the extraction of ore, the industrial production and transportation of all products, monitoring population numbers, mines and factories, exploring other planetary systems, negotiating with other states and independent planets, and waging wars.

The game requires the player to constantly plan for the future. For example, one point of agricultural potential requires the employment of half a point of population and allows for four points of food. Excess food can be transported to planets that have a food shortage, but a sufficiently large fleet of traders (one for each food point) is required to do so. Similar accounts are kept for the extraction of ore in mines and for industrial production. The computer does this automatically, but the player should appropriately balance food, ore, manpower, and transportation resources for maximum production. The production is symbolized in points, which are then consumed for certain products. These can be new mines, factories, defense bases, traders (transporting food or ore), transports (transporting people: population or army) and warships. It is also possible to increase the technological level, food potential and create armies. Warships are a special case here, because the player can design them himself by selecting the hull size (small, medium, large) and allocating design points to seven different categories (Planetary Bombardment, Energy Weapons, Missile Systems, Evasion, Armor, Anti-Missile, Speed). It is allowed to have eight different warship designs at the same time.

All this only gives the potential to achieve the goal of expanding the empire. The means, on the other hand, are military and trade expeditions, negotiations and, of course, wars. Here, too, there is a wealth of variants: the player can lead an open fight or blockade planets (in order to cut off the transport of people and products). Enemy or independent planets can be conquered or pacified. In the former case, however, the player can expect guerrilla warfare to destroy agriculture and industry.

== Reception ==
Stewart MacKames reviewed the game for Computer Gaming World, and stated that "it must be concluded that Imperium Galactum is a game which due to randomization factors, optional alternate cluster make-ups, a long list of features, challenging levels of solitaire play, and Machiavellian multiplayer dynamics, will continue to be enjoyed for a very long time."
