= Fighter Command: The Battle of Britain =

1983 combat flight simulator

- Publisher: Strategic Simulations
- Platforms: Apple II, Commodore 64
- Release: 1983

Fighter Command: The Battle of Britain is a 1983 video game published by Strategic Simulations.

== Gameplay ==
Fighter Command is a game in which aerial combat in the Battle of Britain is simulated.

== Reception ==
Tom Cheche reviewed the game for Computer Gaming World, and stated that "Although FC includes a one day scenario, (Eagle Day), the beauty of the game is most apparent in the campaign scenario, which recreates the crucial period from mid-August to mid-September 1940."
