= Entomorph: Plague of the Darkfall =

1995 video game

- Developer: Cyberlore Studios
- Publisher: Mindscape Inc.
- Producer: Scott Cuthbertson
- Designers: Jim DuBois; Herb Perez
- Programmer: Ken Grey
- Artist: Rob Caswell
- Platforms: Windows, Mac OS
- Release: 10 September 1995
- Genre: Role-playing video game
- Mode: Single-player

Entomorph: Plague of the Darkfall is a 1995 action-adventure role-playing video game by Strategic Simulations, Inc. It was re-released in 2013 on GOG.com.

== Gameplay ==
Entomorph is a Top-Down action RPG. The character is controlled by mouse or keyboard with a full range of movement and basic attacks as well as magic spells. The game features an overworld style similar to older Legend of Zelda games like A Link to the Past; i.e., the player moves to the edge of the screen to change areas.

== Plot ==
After a mishap with a giant time controlling spider, Warwick must restart his journey to find and stop the origin of the giant insects that are attacking his home. After reanimating the corpse of the village shaman to summon the ancient guardian of his tribe, Warwick travels to Povros, Where an insidious plot is in full swing to slowly turn the islands inhabitants into giant insects to replace the original insects which all vanished over night decades ago.

Warwick will join the local resistance alongside his sister and fight his way inside the lairs of 3 types of giant insects. The giant bees, The giant Ants and the giant Spiders. Each nest contains a queen responsible for the production of the Nectar that is changing the islands populous. Tempted at each nest by the Undiluted Royal nectar, Warwick himself will slowly change into a giant praying mantis with each victory.

Fully transformed, Warwick infiltrates the islands castle where he confronts the original source, The queen. Cursed and changed into a fleshy abomination by an ancient artifact. Warwick defeats the queen only for the artifact to latch onto to him instead. In a desperate flight he manages to make his way to the sarcophagus that housed the artifact and seals it again, Undoing the transformations its power has caused.

== Publication history ==
It is the second video game based in the fictional universe World of Aden, the first being World of Aden: Thunderscape. Though both games share the same setting, Entomorph is not a sequel to Thunderscape.

== Reception ==
Reception

Review scores
Publication	Score
Next Generation	3/5
PC Format	79%
PC Gamer (US)	81%
Arcane	7/10
PC Zone	78 out of 100
Fusion	4 out of 5
Computer Game Review	86/83/80
PC Entertainment	4/5

Writing for PC Gamer US, Trent Ward called Entomorph "an attractive, innovative break from the usual RPG fare". The reviewer for Next Generation called the game a "refreshing mixture" of mechanics and praised its graphics and music, but found fault with its control scheme and combat system.

In Computer Gaming World, Scorpia wrote that the game "probably does not have enough of any one element to satisfy fans of a particular genre", but that it "does work fairly well with what it has". The magazine included Entomorph in its holiday 1995 buyer's guide, where a writer noted that "the action and unique story will provide gamers with an interesting, and different, CRPG".

Chris Anderson of PC Zone considered Entomorph to be an attempt to compete with Ultima VIII, and he found it unsuccessful in this regard, but summarized the game as "good and reasonably big, with a fairly engrossing storyline". Fusion's Dave Harris called the game "a good beginner's RPG" and "an excellent adjunct" to Thunderscape. In PC Format, Mark Ramshaw agreed with Anderson that the game fell short of Ultima VIII, particularly in its graphics, but also wrote: "That said, it's expansive, it's slick, the plot contains thrills, adventure and genuine humour, and the insect theme is a winner. Make no mistake, Entomorph really isn't half bad".

Andy Butcher reviewed Entomorph: Plague of the Darkfall for Arcane magazine, rating it a 7 out of 10 overall. Butcher comments that "Entomorph's a fun, engaging game that stresses puzzle-solving over endless combat, and the original (compared to most computer games, at least) story offers a lot more interest than yet another dungeon trek".

In his book Dungeons and Desktops: The History of Computer Role-Playing Games (2008), the video game historian Matt Barton called Entomorph and its companion World of Aden: Thunderscape "well-crafted and highly playable games [that] attracted little interest from CRPG fans then or now".
