= World of Aden: Thunderscape =

1995 video game

- Developer: Strategic Simulations
- Publisher: Mindscape
- Producer: Carl C. Norman
- Designer: Chris Carr
- Programmer: Russell Brown
- Artist: Maurie Manning
- Composers: Danny Pelfrey; Rick Rhodes
- Platforms: MS-DOS, Windows
- Release: October 1995: MS-DOS; 2013: Windows
- Genre: Role-playing
- Mode: Single-player

World of Aden: Thunderscape is a swords & sorcery role-playing video game for MS-DOS compatible operating systems developed by Strategic Simulations and published by Mindscape in 1995. The game is based on the world described in the fantasy trilogy of the same name.

== Plot ==
The world has recently and drastically changed from medieval swords-and-sorcery to a mixed renaissance and Industrial Revolution tech level. Flintlocks and muskets are the best weapons an adventurer can hope for, but there are extremely expensive, very powerful machine guns called "storm cannons". The world has also recently fallen under the effects of the "Darkfall", an event causing thousands of demons or "nocturnals" to enter the world, along with Corrupted, those who have made a deal with the forces of the Darkfall for power-and usually a curse of some sort.

== Gameplay ==
The player controls a party with up to six members with skills, spells, and equipment.

== Release ==
Strategic Simulations developed World of Aden: Thunderscape. Mindscape published it in early 1995. A follow-up, Entomorph, was also released that year. The property was acquired by Kyoudai Games in 2013.

World of Aden: Thunderscape was re-released in 2013 on GOG.com with Microsoft Windows support.

== Reception ==
Reception

Review scores
Publication	Score
PC Gamer (US)	84%
Arcane	6/10
Computer Game Review	71/86/83

T. Liam McDonald of PC Gamer US wrote: "It's fun, it's different, it's well-done, and it promises great things for the future of this World of Aden line". The magazine left its Game of the Year award category for "Best Roleplaying Game" empty in 1995, as the editors believed none of the year's releases were strong enough to deserve it. However, the editors nevertheless highlighted Thunderscape as "a very good game", which "gave us hope for much better games in the future".

In Computer Gaming World, Scorpia wrote that Thunderscape's automap is "among the most horrible I have ever seen", and she found fault with the game's extensive length and lack of polish. While she enjoyed the first quarter of the game, she believed that its later sections devolved into an "interminable bore", which was "likely to appeal most to the devoted hack-and-slasher". The magazine later included Thunderscape in its holiday 1995 buyer's guide, where a writer noted that, despite the game's "minor problems", players "could do worse than visit ... [this] emerging world".

Andy Butcher reviewed Thunderscape for Arcane magazine, rating it a 6 out of 10 overall. Butcher comments that "it isn't a bad game. It's fun, and mildly absorbing. But it doesn't offer anything new and soon becomes boring".

In his book Dungeons and Desktops: The History of Computer Role-Playing Games (2008), the video game historian Matt Barton called Thunderscape and its companion Entomorph "well-crafted and highly playable games [that] attracted little interest from CRPG fans then or now".

== Legacy ==
A pen and paper role-playing game (RPG) was produced by West End Games. In 2013, Kyoudai Games acquired the rights to the game, and is the current publisher of the tabletop RPG based on The World of Aden property (as of February 2022). A year later in March 2014, Kyoudai launched the Core Rulebook of the Campaign Setting for the Pathfinder RPG.
