= S. E. U. I. S. =

1982 video game

S.E.U.I.S.
- Publisher: Strategic Simulations
- Platform: Apple II
- Release: 1982
- Genres: Action, strategy

S. E. U. I. S. is an Apple II video game published by Strategic Simulations in 1982. Both a player vs. player and player-vs-computer, the goal is to take control of the Ozgortian sector through various fights using a fleet of spaceships.

== Reception ==
Chris Smith reviewed SSI's RapidFire Line in The Space Gamer No. 59, and commented that "My resulting disappointment lay in the fact that this game, unlike the others in the line, added nothing new to the computer game field. Combining strategic space games with arcade was a good idea, but there are still better arcade games of both kinds."

Dick Richards reviewed the game for Computer Gaming World, and stated that "I can think of only one real negative to the game. . .its name. Whether you call it SEUIS, or Shoot 'Em Up In Space, it sounds dim. But, if every game I buy plays as well and offers as much flexibility, then I really don't care what it's called."
