= Dungeon Master's Assistant Volume I =

- Developer: Strategic Simulations

Dungeon Master's Assistant Volume I is a computer program published by Strategic Simulations.

== Description ==
Dungeon Master's Assistant Volume I is a computer utility that generates encounters for tabletop Dungeons & Dragons role-playing games using material from the Monster Manual and Dungeon Master's Guide.

== Reception ==
Jim Trunzo reviewed Dungeon Master's Assistant Volume I in White Wolf #16 (June/July, 1989), rating it a 2 out of 5 and stated that "To give Dungeon Masters Assistant its due, it is quite complete and does exactly what it claims to do as far as producing encounters that list the number of monsters, their weapons and armor and the types of spells used (if any). It simply doesn't do it in a convenient enough fashion to justify its use."

== Reviews ==
- Info
- Chicago Tribune
