= The Road to Gettysburg =

1982 video game

- Developer: Strategic Simulations
- Publisher: Strategic Simulations
- Platform: Apple II
- Release: 1982
- Genre: Turn-based strategy

The Road to Gettysburg is a 1982 video game published by Strategic Simulations for the Apple II.

== Gameplay ==
The Road to Gettysburg is a game in which the player is the commander of an army during the American Civil War.

== Reception ==
Bob Proctor reviewed the game for Computer Gaming World, and stated that "If you're new to wargaming, and are interested in The War Between The States, I'd suggest you start with the much simpler Battle of Shiloh. If you want the best that's available, TRTG is it."
