= Cosmic Balance II =

1983 video game

- Publisher: Strategic Simulations
- Designer: Paul Murray
- Platforms: Apple II, Atari 8-bit
- Release: 1983
- Genre: 4X
- Mode: Single-player

The Cosmic Balance II is a turn-based strategy game written by Paul Murray for the Apple II and published by Strategic Simulations in 1983. It was ported to the Atari 8-bit computers. The game is a sequel to The Cosmic Balance (1982) also designed by Murray.

In 1984, SSI published a sequel, Imperium Galactum.

== Gameplay ==
The Cosmic Balance II is a 4X turn-based strategic level space warfare game. The game consists of several scenarios that grow in complexity, starting with a solitary one that acts as a tutorial in resource management, through set two-player scenarios involving more and more planets and ships. The game also has a scenario creation tool. Games can be played against a computer or human opponent.

The map consists of 16 space sectors which vary in size and shape. Despite this, all sectors have 40 planets in them. There are four types of planets in the game: terran, industrial, mining, and farming. Terran planets on their own can produce industrial output (IO). Industrial output is what constitutes income in the game. The remaining types of planets can only produce IO by collectively forming what is called a commerce net.

There are 15 classes of ships. Ships can travel inside or to an adjacent sector to perform missions. Ships have varying capabilities - cost, attack strength, defensive strength, speed, etc. - but the three main qualities of a ship are: hull size; whether they carry cargo or not and; what type of warp drive range they have. These qualities determine which type of mission or missions they are best suited for.

Combat is resolved either by the game itself randomly calculating a result or allows an interface with The Cosmic Balance I, the tactical level space combat game preceding Cosmic Balance II. The interface between the two games is essentially manual. In this case, Cosmic Balance II lists the ship types involved in the battle, the type of Cosmic Balance I scenario which corresponds to the Cosmic Balance II mission being performed, and the tech levels of the combatants. The player(s) save their game, load Cosmic Balance I, set up the appropriate scenario in it, and complete a game. They then reload Cosmic Balance II and their saved game. Cosmic Balance II then asks for the results: ships destroyed, captured, or that ran away. These are entered and the game continues based on these entered results.

== Reception ==
Computer Gaming World stated that Cosmic Balance II "was too much like working on a balance sheet and watching the numbers change" and "VisiCalc in space". It stated that the game was best played as a companion to its predecessor. In a 1992 survey of science fiction games, the magazine gave the title and its predecessor three of five stars, writing that they "were excellent products in their day", and gave Imperium Galactum two stars, stating that "it simply lacked sufficient 'chrome' to make it enduring". A 1994 survey of strategic space games set in the year 2000 and later gave Imperium Galactum one star.

== See also ==
- List of 4X video games
