= Professional Tour Golf =

1983 video game

- Publisher: Strategic Simulations
- Designer: Henry L. Richbourg
- Platforms: Apple II, Commodore 64
- Release: 1983
- Genre: Sports

Professional Tour Golf is a golf video game published by Strategic Simulations for the Apple II and Commodore 64 in 1983.

== Gameplay ==
Professional Tour Golf is a game in which professional golf is simulated using golfer statistics.

== Reception ==
Roy Wagner reviewed the game for Computer Gaming World, and stated that "PTG is an excellent statistical simulation of golf both in play realism and in what can be learned for playing real golf with all the play options available, you will not get bored of this game very quickly."
