= Resolution 101 =

1990 video game

- Developer: Astral Software
- Publishers: EU: Millennium Interactive; NA: Accolade
- Platforms: Amiga, Atari ST, MS-DOS
- Release: EU: 1990; NA: 1991

Resolution 101 is a video game developed by Astral Software for the Amiga, Atari ST, and MS-DOS and published in 1990 by Millennium Interactive. It was released in North America as Hoverforce in 1991.

== Gameplay ==
Hoverforce is a game in which MetaCity in the future year of 2050 A.D. is locked in ongoing drug wars, presented as a hybrid of an action game and simulation game.

== Reception ==
David M. Wilson reviewed the game for Computer Gaming World, and stated that "Hoverforce has its weaknesses, but the game offers players just what is promised. It is a real whiz-bang shoot-'em-up! There is enough destruction to please even the most violent player. Players who are seeking a fast-paced, challenging arcade action game are invited to join Sheriff Stone's squad of Future Narcs."

Jonathan Bell for Compute! said "Hover-Force deserves a place on the hard drives of action fans everywhere. You need only take the controls of the HoverKill, and you'll be hooked. Hunting down Alterants is a hard habit to break."

Tom Malcom for Info gave the game four stars and said "If you're immune to motion sickness, Hoverforce will give you some of the best mind-bending action you've ever had."

Damon Howarth for Page 6 said "This is a good value budget game that I would be happy to recommend since it combines a strong shoot em up with a fairly effective driving game. one game that does pass the test of time."
