= Renegade: The Battle for Jacob's Star =

1995 video game

- Developer: Midnight Software
- Publisher: Strategic Simulations
- Series: Renegade Legion
- Platform: MS-DOS
- Release: 1995
- Genre: Space flight simulation
- Mode: Single-player

Renegade: The Battle for Jacob's Star is a space flight simulation game developed by Midnight Software for MS-DOS compatible operating systems and published in 1995 Strategic Simulations.

== Background ==
Renegade: the Battle for Jacob's Star is based on Renegade Legion.

== Development and release ==
Renegade: The Battle for Jacob's Star is based on the Renegade Legion science fiction franchise from FASA. Publisher Strategic Simulations, Inc. (SSI) obtained the license for the series and produced the first computer game adaptation, 1990's Renegade Legion: Interceptor, which was a faithful adaptation of the original board game with relatively simply graphics and sound. SSI associate producer David Lucca said that team contemplated using the license to create a state-of-the-art action game or flight simulator. The Battle for Jacob's Star was contracted to Midnight Software, a Canadian company who had previously worked on the 3D flight simulator Heroes of the 357th for Electronic Arts.

Lucca likened the scenario for The Battle for Jacob's Star to Baa Baa Black Sheep. Voice talent was hired through the American Federation of Television and Radio Artists (AFTRA). Lucca also said that there was disagreement among the staff regarding the type of music that should be used in the soundtrack, so a redbook audio option was included to allow players to play their music of choice by swapping in their own CDs during missions.

The Battle for Jacob's Star was released for PCs in early 1995.

The Battle for Jacob's Star was re-released digitally on both Steam and GOG.com by publisher SNEG as part of the SSI Classics compilation on December 19, 2023.

== Gameplay ==
The Battle for Jacob's Star is a space flight simulation game.

== Reception ==
Reception

Review scores
Publication	Score
Computer Game Review	86/100
Computer Gaming World	3/5
Hyper	86%
Joystick	180/200
Next Generation	4/5
PC Games (DE)	67%
PC Zone	75/100
Electronic Games	B+
Electronic Entertainment	4/5
MikroBitti	84/100
PC Games (UK)	83%
Pelit	70/100
Secret Service	80%

Renegade: The Battle for Jacob's Star received generally favorable reviews. A reviewer for Next Generation hailed Renegade: The Battle for Jacob's Star as one of the few Wing Commander III: Heart of the Tiger clones which does not rely on expensive production to emulate that game's success. Particularly praising the 3D fighter models, absorbing storyline, detailed character development, and strategic gameplay, he gave it four out of five stars.

== Sequel ==
A direct sequel titled Renegade II: Return to Jacob's Star was announced at the end of the year and slated for release in early 1996. New features such as online multiplayer and a mission editor were advertised. A game demo became available and some magazine even provided full reviews. However, the sequel was ultimately dropped from SSI's release schedule.
