= First Over Germany =

1988 video game

- Publisher: Strategic Simulations
- Platforms: Commodore 64, MS-DOS
- Release: 1988: C64; 1989: MS-DOS
- Genre: Computer wargame

First Over Germany is a computer wargame published by Strategic Simulations for the Commodore 64 in 1988. An MS-DOS version followed in 1989.

== Gameplay ==
First Over Germany is a game in which a simulation covers the World War II missions of the 306th Bomb Group.

== Reception ==
Hosea Battles reviewed the game for Computer Gaming World, and stated that "Any player that wants to know the human factor of the air war will be interested in this game and those who enjoyed 50 Mission Crush and B-24 will definitely want to play this game."
