= Renegade II: Return to Jacob's Star =

- Developer: Midnight Software
- Publisher: Strategic Simulations
- Series: Renegade Legion
- Platform: MS-DOS
- Release: 1996 (planned)
- Genre: Space flight simulation
- Modes: Single-player and Multi-player

Renegade II: Return to Jacob's Star (sometimes just Renegade II or Renegade: Return to Jacob’s Star) is a cancelled space flight simulation game developed in mid-1990s by Midnight Software for MS-DOS compatible operating systems. It was announced at the end of 1995 and slated for release in early 1996, with demo and beta versions released, and some magazines even provided full reviews before the game was cancelled.

== Development and cancellation ==
Reception

Review scores
Publication	Score
Next Generation	2/5 stars
Computer Game Review	84/100
Świat Gier Komputerowych	8/10

The game is set in the Renegade Legion universe developed by FASA. It was a direct sequel for Renegade: The Battle for Jacob's Star, released in 1995, continuing its plotline, with the adversaries from the previous game, the Terran Overlord Government (TOG), not having been fully vanquished, staging a counter-attack.

New features such as online multiplayer (including PvP and co-op modes) and a mission editor were advertised. The game was to feature ten pilotable spaceships (including two or three new ones) and sixty missions. Previews noted that as the first part was a solid if underrated game, with the sequel reusing predecessor’s graphics engine, which means it was expected be compatible with relatively modest hardware while being visually appealing if not cutting-edge; the new advertised features (multiplayer and mission editor) were seen as appealing as well.

It was announced at the end of that year and slated for release in early 1996. A game demo became available and some magazines even provided full reviews of an advanced version described in some reviews as the beta version. March issue of PC Entertainment noted that the game "should be on sale now"; March issue of Power Play described the game as available early that month. March issue of Joystick described it as planned for release in April. However, the May issue of Computer Game Review only had access to the beta version. The July review for the Next Generation claimed that the game "is out". The version reviewed in September issue of Polish magazine Świat Gier Komputerowych had working campaign and mission editor features, among others. However, the sequel was ultimately dropped from SSI's release schedule. Computer Games Strategy Plus reported in August of 1996 that this was due to licensing issues with FASA. According to Computer Gaming World report from September that year, Mindscape had chosen to cancel it due to poor quality.

== Reception ==
The game development was advanced enough that copies were sent for review worldwide, and a number of gaming magazines published their reviews.

Stefano Silvestri reviewed the demo for the Italian The Games Machine magazine, calling it a "a pleasant and interesting product" with clear influences from TIE Fighter and Wing Commander. The demo reviewer for PC Gamer was even more positive, noting "fast and furious" gameplay and "super-looking high-resolution graphics" with will still run on modest hardware.

Frank Snyder reviewed the beta version of the game for May issue of Computer Game Review, concluding that it is "quality entertainment", with "[pretty solid] combat engine and enemy Al" and "the graphics "on par with the current standards".

The reviewer for the Next Generation was much less generous, calling the first installment in the series "a pretty big mistake". Regarding the sequel, he opined that it is mediocre, although it "vastly improved some of the problems of the first one, it still leaves a lot to be desired". He criticized poor NPC AI and "tedious" execution of wingman selection (due to too many screens), but praised the game for gorgeous high-res graphics with lower hardware spec requirements than the competition.

Piotr Bilski reviewed the game for the Polish magazine Świat Gier Komputerowych. He noted that while the plot, and corresponding to it missions are similar to other similar productions, the game has good graphics despite relatively low system requirements (however, he criticized the animation of debris from destroyed spaceships, which he compared to unrealistic lego bricks). He also noted that despite many elements inspired by other games, Renegade II also has some original aspects, such as the mission editor, original design of cockpits and support for phone communication in multiplayer. He described space combat as a mix of Wing Commander and X-Wing mechanics, which also realistically requires the use of joystick, and noted improvements in enemy's AI. He concluded that while the game is not revolutionary, it is satisfactory, and should be appealing to fans of space combat simulators.
