= Objection! (video game) =

1992 video game

- Developer: Ashley Lipson
- Publisher: TransMedia Productions
- Platform: MS-DOS
- Release: 1992
- Genre: Simulation

Objection! is a legal simulation video game for MS-DOS published by TransMedia Productions in 1992.

== Gameplay ==
Objection! is a game which is aimed at improving the evidentiary law capabilities for a practicing trial lawyer.

== Development ==
Objection! was programmed by Ashley Lipson, Professor of Law.

== Reception ==
Jasper Sylvester reviewed the game for Computer Gaming World, and stated that "we find the program suitable for those who want a challenge that is cerebral, realistic and intense. Case dismissed."

Aurora Dizon for PC World said "Objection! a game you don't play to win, but win by playing."
