= Operation: Cleanstreets =

1988 video game

- Developer(s): Silmarils
- Publisher(s): Broderbund
- Platform(s): Amiga, Atari ST, IBM
- Release: 1988: Amiga; 1989: Atari ST
- Genre(s): Beat 'em up

Operation: Cleanstreets is a beat 'em up video game developed by Silmarils and published for the Amiga by Broderbund in 1988. An Atari ST version followed in 1989.

== Description ==
The hero of the game, Cleanup Harry, is a cop determined to launch a one-man war against a gang, which has infested one of several seedy neighbourhoods. Harry uses punches and kicks to defeat a variety of villains, who come armed with knives, chainsaws and other lethal weapons. Whenever Harry defeated a drug dealer, he must search the body for contraband. The goal of the game was to collect all illegal substances, from every defeated criminal, and burn it all in a fire at the end of the game.

== Reception ==
Amiga User Magazine wrote "The rendition of the neighbourhood is outstanding. The multiscreen playfield has superbly detailed backgrounds. The atmospheric drawings are enlivened with numerous bits of animation." Although the graphics were highly lauded, by the standards of 1988, reviews were mixed. Amiga User Magazine writes "Operation: Cleanstreets looks great, but its content doesn't measure up to the graphics. The story beats by a mile the 'rescue the princess from the castle' plotline found in most martial arts games, but it isn't enough. The design still seems thin."
