= Roadwar 2000 =

1986 video game

- Developers: Strategic Simulations; Westwood Associates (Amiga, IIGS, ST)
- Publisher: Strategic Simulations
- Designer: Jeffrey Johnson
- Platforms: Apple II, Commodore 64, MS-DOS, Amiga, Apple IIGS, Atari ST, PC-88, PC-98, Sharp X1
- Release: 1986 Apple II, C64, MS-DOS (NA); 1987 Amiga, IIGS, ST (NA); 1988 PC-88, PC-98, X1 (Japan)
- Genre: Post-apocalyptic
- Mode: Single-player

Roadwar 2000 is a video game published by Strategic Simulations (SSI) in 1986 set in a post-apocalyptic world that resembles the Mad Max films.

== Description ==
Roadwar 2000 is a turn-based strategy game for a single player.

=== Gameplay and plot ===
Atari ST screenshot

A virus has caused the collapse of civilization, and cars have become the primary form of transportation, combat and survival.

The player starts off as a scavenger and attempts to build up an army capable of crossing between cities on highways, which have become littered with hordes of marauding mutants, cannibals, and criminal gangs.

Winning enough battles and gathering a sizable army may bring the player's character to attention of the ailing US government, which will recruit the player to find eight missing scientists, America's only hope to finding a cure for the virus. The player must bring them to a secret base, looting cities and scavenging for needed supplies and munitions along the way.

The game calculates and displays detailed statistics during the frequent combat encounters. In early versions of the game, these are displayed as text-only messages; the Amiga and Atari ST versions added digitized sound.

== Release ==
SSI originally released it in 1986 for the Apple II and Commodore 64. In 1987, the game was ported to the Amiga, Atari ST, Apple IIGS, FM-7, NEC PC-8801, and MS-DOS. The Amiga, Atari ST and Apple IIGS versions, developed by Westwood Associates, sported digital sound effects and higher-quality graphics than the previous versions.

Roadwar 2000 was followed by Roadwar Europa in 1987, which used the same platforms as R2000.

== Reception ==
Reception

Review scores
Publication	Score
Computer Gaming World	2.5/5
Dragon	5/5

SSI sold 44,044 copies of Roadwar 2000 in North America.

In Issue 118 of Dragon, Hartley and Patricia Lesser commented, "Roadwar 2000 is a great offering and is easily enjoyed by players who have fantasy role-playing backgrounds because you do, indeed, control the shots for your crew." Eight issues later, the Lessers gave the game 5 out of 5 stars.

James Trunzo, writing for Compute! stated that the game successfully combined individual combat and strategy with good graphics, and concluded that it was "yet another successful product from SSI".

In Issue 81 of Space Gamer/Fantasy Gamer, Robbie Robberson noted "The Roadwar series is an example of a good idea that is short circuited by its components. If Strategic Simulations, Inc. can release these games with a better and quicker combat routine, or better yet, reduce the incidence of combat, these games would be a required addition to every serious computer gamer's library. As of now, they are simply entertaining in the short run, and tedious in the long."

In Issue 5 of Gateways, warned "Read the manual carefully! We say this first because Roadwar 2000 is a complex game that requires your full attention and a great deal of planning. This is a product for people who like their game software detailed and highly interactive. Long range planning and crisis management are absolutely tied into the player's actions in the game." The Thans concluded, "The play is violent and relentless; the art of staying alive often requires less-than-heroic acts like gunning down the needy or looting supermarkets. All in all, it succeeds in portraying a grim and hopeless future that can only can be salvaged by far-from-perfect heroes."

Computer Gaming World in 1992 and again in 1994 gave the 6-8 year old game 2+ stars out of five, stating "It is quite dated today, although it can be fun as a semi-'no brainer.'"
