= Wargame Construction Set III: Age of Rifles 1846–1905 =

1996 computer wargame

- Developer: Strategic Simulations
- Publisher: Strategic Simulations
- Producer: John Eberhardt
- Designers: Norm Koger; Steve Burke
- Programmer: Norm Koger
- Artist: Gennady Krakovsky
- Platform: MS-DOS
- Release: NA: August 26, 1996; EU: 1996
- Genre: Computer wargame
- Modes: Single-player, multiplayer

Wargame Construction Set III: Age of Rifles 1846–1905 (or simply Age of Rifles) is a turn-based computer wargame for MS-DOS, written by Norm Koger. It was published in 1996 by Strategic Simulations. It is the third game in the Wargame Construction Set series, following Wargame Construction Set (1986) and Wargame Construction Set II: Tanks! (1994).

== Scope ==
Age of Rifles simulates battles throughout the era of percussion rifles, roughly comprising the second half of the 19th century. To this end, several dozen battle scenarios are provided in the game. Most of them are set during the American Civil War, but scenarios from the Crimean War, the Anglo-Zulu War, Afghan Wars, the Prusso-Austrian and the Franco-Prussian War, and the Russo-Japanese War are also included.

Scenarios can be played individually or within the framework of a campaign, where the outcome of earlier battles influences the course of later battles. In addition, random scenarios are available as well.

There is also a scenario editor with which users can develop and share their own battles, and thereby extend the scope of the game. Scenarios as early as the Battle of Hastings have been generated this way.

== Gameplay ==
The game can be played with two human players, or with the computer taking over one or both sides. An option for playing out battles via e-Mail is also provided.

== Current status ==
There is still a small community of players who develop and publish new scenarios for AoR.

Depending on the individual PC configuration, AoR may work as-is under Windows XP and Windows 7, or may require DOSBox to run.

A Steam version was released on December 19, 2023.

== Reception ==
Reception

Review scores
Publication	Score
PC Gamer (US)	86%
PC Games	B

The game was a finalist for Computer Gaming World's 1996 "Wargame of the Year" award, which ultimately went to Battleground 4: Shiloh.
