= Wargame Construction Set =

- Developer(s): Roger Damon
- Publisher(s): Strategic Simulations
- Platform(s): Amiga, Atari 8-bit, Atari ST, Commodore 64, MS-DOS
- Release: 1986
- Genre(s): Computer wargame, game creation system
- Mode(s): Single-player, multiplayer

Wargame Construction Set is a video game game creation system published in 1986 by Strategic Simulations. Developed by Roger Damon, it allows the user to construct, edit and play customizable wargame scenarios. It was released for the Amiga, Atari 8-bit computers, Atari ST, Commodore 64, and MS-DOS. Several sequels followed.

== Overview ==
The application is based on Roger Damon's source code for Operation Whirlwind, Field of Fire, and Panzer Grenadier. It lets users design and play wargames from simple to complex. Users start by drawing maps and placing geographical features and buildings in any arrangement and scale desired. There are several levels of combat: from man-to-man engagements to large scale strategic campaigns. Each unit can be given different attributes such as unit type, weapon type and firepower, movement and strength points.

Users are able to create scenarios from many periods of military history, ranging from spears and catapults to missiles and tanks. Users can create various genres of wargames including sword-and-sorcery fantasies or science-fiction battles.

The game comes with eight pre-made ready-to-play scenarios which can be modified or played as-is.

== Reception ==
Computer Gaming World rated Wargame Construction Set in 1987 and twice in 1993 with 2.5, 2.5, and two points out of five, respectively. It stated that "the game's potential ... is limited by the failings of the system's mechanics", and only suitable for novices. Orson Scott Card viewed it more favorably, describing it in Compute! as "a simple, elegant, infinitely variable game".

== Review ==
- Casus Belli #45 (June 1988)

== Legacy ==
Wargame Construction Set II: Tanks! was released in 1994, supporting armored combat. It was named the best computer wargame of 1994 by Computer Games Strategy Plus.

Wargame Construction Set III: Age of Rifles 1846–1905 was released in 1996.
