= Renegade Legion =

Series of science fiction games designed by Sam Lewis

Renegade Legion is a series of analog and digital science fiction games designed by Sam Lewis, produced by FASA, and published from 1989 to 1993. The line was then licensed to Nightshift games, a spin-off of the garage company Crunchy Frog Enterprises by Paul Arden Lidberg, which published one scenario book, a gaming aid, and three issues of a fanzine-quality periodical before reverting the license.

The Renegade Legion series is made up of five board games, a role-playing game, a war game, and two video games. The non-digital games, except for one board game, are compatible on all levels.

Set in the 69th Century, the series allowed gamers to play out the battles between the "Terran Overlord Government" (TOG), a corrupt galactic empire, and the "Commonwealth", an alliance of humans and aliens. The focus of the plot, like with many strategy games, is to present a long term conflict to enable as many individual situations and environments as possible. Most of Renegade Legion deals with large military battles to be played on hexagonal grid mapsheets in a turn-based rules system.

== The universe ==
The setting can best fit into the space opera category. The themes involve large-scale military operations as the Terran Overlord Government (TOG for short) attempts to completely conquer the Milky Way Galaxy. There are many alien races involved, and stories often use elements such royal bloodlines, betrayal, and normally leave little room for a peaceful solution.

The back story to the setting has the human race exploring and colonizing many worlds in the galaxy, and coming into contact with several important alien races. After the Snow Plague that eliminates most of the human race, Earth is invaded and conquered by the Kess Rith, a reptilian alien race that can best be physically described as half iguana and half centaur.

Later the humans on Earth successfully rebel and drive off the Kess Rith by emulating the ancient Roman civilization. Over the span of centuries of time this new human movement, which started out as only a noble liberation of Earth and human colony worlds becomes a military dictatorship after a terrorist bomb kills most of the senate. The new government is then led by a Caesar (dictator for life), and appoints a number of personal representatives called Overlords who wield nearly unlimited legal power. It is at this time that a significant disaffected portion of the TOG military defects to the Commonwealth, another human space faring nation smaller than the TOG. TOG becomes increasingly militant, engages in bloodsports, legalizes slavery, and reduces women to property of their father or husband. After defeating the Kess Rith, the new Terran Overlord Government continues their military conquest and attacks other nations who were neutral during their time spent under Kess Rith rule.

The single largest enemy of the TOG is the Commonwealth. It is based primarily on old Earth culture of Britain. While still maintaining its own royal family, it is far more democratic than the TOG, accepts women and aliens as equals, and even includes refugees from both the former Kess Rith empire, exiled or disgusted TOG military legions, and large numbers of TOG women who defect to the Commonwealth. Those women often join all female Commonwealth units called Minerva legions. It is from these various rogue TOG units the setting derives the name of Renegade Legion as they form half of the professional army of the Commonwealth. Their symbol continues to include the original TOG symbol of the planet Earth on an inverted pyramid background, however a hastily painted letter "R" made of four straight brush strokes in red paint is used to deface that original TOG symbol.

== Board games ==
Each of the boxed boardgames in the Renegade Legion series used a template-based mechanic to determine weapon damage. When a unit was hit by a weapon, an additional die roll was used to determine the hit location; a geometric template was placed on the ship diagram at that location, and the armor boxes beneath that template were marked as destroyed. Each weapon had a unique template; more- or less-powerful weapons would use larger or smaller versions of a standard template. The intent was to add depth to the game system beyond simply counting up damage points (as in FASA's BattleTech), as weapon type and hit location would now be important to game resolution.

Another key aspect of the Renegade Legion series was interoperability. All of the games in the system included rules for simultaneous play with the other games, for example using the starfighters from Interceptor as support for the action in a game of Centurion.

Renegade Legion games first shipped with die-cut cardboard boxes as the playing pieces; each side of the box depicted the unit from the appropriate angle (front, back, side, top, or bottom.) The second edition of Centurion replaced these with plastic miniatures.

=== Interceptor The First Line of Defense ===
Interceptor was the first game of the Renegade Legion series, and was based on single- or two-crewmember starfighter combat. A second Edition of the game was announced but not published. Interceptor used a complex diagram of ship systems to track internal damage; this feature proved difficult for players to use and was not carried into the other games of the series.

=== Centurion Blood and Steel ===
Centurion, the second in the Renegade Legion series, covered ground combat. The primary units were high-speed antigravity tanks; the game also included ground vehicles, artillery, and infantry.

=== Leviathan Ships of the Line ===
Leviathan covered capital ship combat. The starfighters from Interceptor were represented not as individual units, but as whole squadrons launched from massive starships. While Leviathan used the same template-based damage resolution mechanic as the other games, the templates were much less complex.

=== Prefect ===
Prefect was a more traditional wargame with large fold-out maps and hundreds of small cardboard counters, that shifted the action from the tactical level to the operational and involved the invasion of an entire star system. The player of Prefect was a high-level commander in either the TOG or Commonwealth forces and controlled thousands of ships, tanks and soldiers fighting over multiple worlds and millions of miles of space.

=== Circus Imperium ===
Circus Imperium was the fifth of the Renegade Legion board games published by FASA, but unlike the others in the series, this tongue-in-cheek game of chariot racing was played strictly for laughs. The game involved anti-grav chariots being pulled by carnivorous beasts, with the object of the game to defeat the other racers, usually by knocking them out of the race or getting them eaten by the monsters. Outcomes of player actions were often random and unpredictable, and players were encouraged in eliciting laughs or the loudest cheers from other gamers. Ral Partha produced a series of lead figures for the game, including chariots, senators and imperial guards. Older catalogs have had these figures present as items available to order but in the exchange of BattleTech figures the Identifiers have changed. There were 3 variants under the old Ral Partha banner dependent on country of purchase.

The "Beast Air Chariot" is still available through Iron Wind at: https://www.ironwindmetals.com/index.php/product-listing/product/shadowrun-ds-154

=== Legionnaire ===
Legionnaire was the role-playing game (RPG) set in the Renegade Legion universe. It expanded the original Renegade Legion setting with three new alien races: the Menelvagoreans, the Vauvusar, and the Zog. While designed primarily as a stand-alone game, it could be integrated into the board games in the series, with stat conversions and guidelines for players who wished to do so.

== Other games ==
=== Video games ===
In addition to the board games and the role-playing game, two computer games set in this universe were published by Strategic Simulations, Inc. Renegade Legion: Interceptor was a straight translation of the turn-based board game of the same name, and allowed two players to fight each other with a squadron of starfighters. The Interceptor computer game also contained a ship creation generator, providing players the ability to produce custom ships.

The second game was called Renegade: the Battle for Jacob's Star. This game deviated from the Interceptor game system by becoming a space dogfighting simulator, very similar to Wing Commander.

A sequel to this game, titled Renegade II: Return to Jacob's Star, was near enough to completion to be reviewed in professional gaming magazines, but was never released.

=== Games development ===
Nightshift games had given Don Gallagher the task of evolving the background as well as revising Interceptor into the long-announced 2nd Edition and creating the announced Phalanx board game.

In his proposal for the background, TOG collapsed and a new human ./. Kess Rith-conflict ensued. In Fan circles, this was received with mixed emotions, and many fans continue to play in the old storyline.

Interceptor, 2nd Edition abolished the flow chart-like internal damage system, in effect making it to "Centurion in Space". The completed rules have been released freely onto the internet, and have a certain following, but never existed as a published work in book format.

Phalanx was to be the game of individual combat, like Battletroops in Battletech or DMZ in Shadowrun. Luc Nadon and Dallen Masters did a playtest version that differed heavily from the Battletroops rules, in effect making Phalanx a tabletop game. No more than a HTML-ed playtest version exists.

== Novels and modules ==
FASA published a number of titles in support of their Renegade Legion games. Interceptor, Centurion and Leviathan each had a number of modules that provided interlinking scenarios for gamers, and each had one technical sourcebook that provided additional ship and vehicle designs. In addition, FASA published Shannedam County, a sourcebook which profiled dozen of planets and star systems where adventures and battles could be set.

There were several paperback novels that used the Renegade Legion setting: Renegade's Honor by William H. Keith Jr.; and Damned If We Do …, Frost Death, and Monsoon, all by Peter L. Rice.

Renegade Legion's Leviathan module was used as the base for FASA's Battletech new aerospace rules known at the time as BattleSpace. Much of Leviathan's movement & damage system rules were used to make it. The Leviathan rules have continued to be used, updated and revised for Battletech's newer aerospace ruleset, Aerotech 2.

In 2006 Catalyst Game Labs revised and enhanced the Aerotech 2 rules. They were split up between Total Warfare and Techmanual. Rules for large naval ships and spacestations are included in the 2008 rulebook, Strategic Operations.

In 2021, an anthology entitled "Voices of Varuna" set in the Renegade Legion universe was published.
