= Renegade Legion: Interceptor =

1990 video game

- Developer: Strategic Simulations
- Publisher: Strategic Simulations
- Platforms: Amiga, MS-DOS
- Release: 1990: MS-DOS; 1991: Amiga
- Genre: Strategy

Renegade Legion: Interceptor is a strategy video game based on the Renegade Legion board games, published in 1990 MS-DOS and 1991 for the Amiga.

== Gameplay ==
Renegade Legion: Interceptor was a straight translation of the turned-based board game of the same name, and allowed two players to fight each other with a squadron of starfighters. The Interceptor computer game also contained a ship creation generator, providing players the ability to produce custom ships.

== Reception ==
Dave Arneson reviewed the game for Computer Gaming World, and stated that "Overall, Interceptor is quite a good game, very challenging and never the same game twice. This reviewer found no "sure-fire" strategies and no "perfect" design for ships. It is easy to imagine large numbers of people beating the keys well into the night, however, to prove that they have the "perfect" interceptor and the tactics that will always win."

Jim Trunzo reviewed Renegade Legion: Interceptor in White Wolf #25 (Feb./March, 1991), rating it a 4 out of 5 and stated that "Renegade Legion: Interceptor is a top of the line design. The playing interface is simple and intuitive, consisting mostly of clicking on 'buttons' and selecting from menus; the game is complete, from ship design to weapon choice; and the variety and entertainment value is high. So load your Neutron Particle Cannons, fuel up your Cheetah starfighter, and come out firing!"

In a 1992 survey of science fiction games, Computer Gaming World gave Renegade Legion Interceptor three of five stars, calling it "an enjoyable interlude". A 1994 survey of strategic space games set in the year 2000 and later gave the game two-plus stars out of five.
