= Tigers in the Snow =

1981 video game

- Developer(s): Strategic Simulations
- Publisher(s): Strategic Simulations
- Designer(s): Chuck Kroegel; David Landrey; David Walker
- Platform(s): Apple II, Atari 8-bit, Commodore 64, TRS-80, MS-DOS
- Release: 1981
- Genre(s): Wargame

The Battle of the Bulge: Tigers in the Snow is a turn-based strategy computer wargame published in 1981 by Strategic Simulations. It was designed by Chuck Kroegel, David Landrey, and David Walker for the Apple II, Atari 8-bit computers, and TRS-80. It was later ported to the IBM PC and Commodore 64.

It was the first video game to feature the Battle of the Bulge of 1944 and 1945, a decisive Allied victory over German forces in World War II, as its subject. Heavily inspired by board games, the game was played on a hexagonal grid and included such features as a supply, terrain and weather system.

== Reception ==
Richard Charles Karr reviewed the game for Computer Gaming World, writing:

Tigers In The Snow is enjoyable as a "situation in doubt" game, with the possibility of German break-outs threatening to roll up the American line. The tension of hoping your perfectly laid plans don't disintegrate in your face can keep you riveted in your seat for hours. Although the game is not as innovative as other SSI games it is a design which deserves attention as part of the improving integration of wargames and computer software.

A 1993 Computer Gaming World survey of wargames gave Tigers in the Snow one star out of five, stating that its primitive graphics, play mechanics, and user interface "have been superseded by more recent efforts".

Ahoy! in 1984 wished that the Commodore 64 version used SSI's Combat Leader's superior graphics, but praised the game's realism.
