= Battles of Napoleon =

1988 computer wargame

- Developer(s): Chuck Kroegel; David Landrey
- Publisher(s): Strategic Simulations
- Platform(s): Apple II, Commodore 64, MS-DOS
- Release: 1988
- Genre(s): Computer wargame

Battles of Napoleon is a computer wargame by Chuck Kroegel and David Landrey. It was published in 1988 by Strategic Simulations for the Apple II, Commodore 64, and MS-DOS compatible operating systems.

== Scenario disks ==
Designer David Landrey received permission from SSI to release expansion packs for Battles of Napoleon and, in 1994, the game itself from his company, Novastar Games.

Scenario disk #1

- Austerlitz
- Marengo
- Utitsa
- Redoubt

Scenario disk #2

- Albuera
- Medellin
- Bridge Battle
- Santon
- New Orleans

Scenario disk #3

- Camden
- Cowpens
- Kings Mountain
- Hobkirk
- Eutaw Springs

Scenario disk #4

- Wagram
- Smolensk
- Eylau
- Plancenoit
- Bladensburg
- The Hill
- Waterloo (variant)
- Leipzig (variant)

Scenario disk #5

- Leipzig (variant)
- Quatre Bras (variant)
- Vimiero
- Aspern-Essling
- Podubno
- Village
- Retreat
- Ligny

Scenario disk #6

- Pyramids
- Raab
- Craonne
- Corunna
- Borodino (variant)
- North
- Jena
- Wavre

== Reception ==
Battles of Napoleon sold under 10,000 copies. Computer Gaming World gave it a glowing review, calling it "the game that can keep you satisfied, even addicted, for many years to come." The magazine in 1989 named it Wargame of the Year, in 1990 gave the game five out of five stars, in 1993 gave it three-plus stars, stating that "its play value and historical accuracy mandated its acquisition for anyone interested in the period". and in 1994 stated that the game "far outshines any Napoleonic game released since", with "a veritable cult following".

In 1996, Computer Gaming World declared Battles of Napoleon the 91st-best computer game ever released. The magazine's wargame columnist Terry Coleman named it his pick for the seventh-best computer wargame released by late 1996.
