= Napoleon's Campaigns: 1813 & 1815 =

1981 video game

- Publisher: Strategic Simulations
- Platform: Apple II
- Release: 1981
- Genre: Turn-based strategy

Napoleon's Campaigns: 1813 & 1815 is a 1981 video game published by Strategic Simulations.

== Gameplay ==
Napoleon's Campaigns: 1813 & 1815 is a game in which scenarios based on the Battle of Leipzig (October 1813) and the Battle of Waterloo (June 1815) are included.

== Reception ==
Daniel Weitz reviewed the game for Computer Gaming World, and stated that "This game is a must for anyone interested in the problems of army-level command or Napoleonic simulations. If Napoleon had an Apple and this game at Leipzig, he would have seen the handwriting on the screen and headed for the Rhine, kicking his aides-de-camp all the way."
