= Operation Market Garden (video game) =

1985 video game

- Publisher(s): Strategic Simulations
- Release: 1985
- Genre(s): Wargame

Operation Market Garden is a 1985 video game published by Strategic Simulations.

== Gameplay ==
Operation Market Garden is a game in which the Allies of World War II try to take over the Ruhr district in late 1944.

== Reception ==
Bob Proctor reviewed the game for Computer Gaming World, and stated that "an entire game can be concluded in a single evening. I recommend this game to all WW II fans."
