= Red Lightning (video game) =

1989 video game

- Cover art of Red Lightning
- Publisher: Strategic Simulations
- Designer: Norm Koger
- Platforms: Amiga, Atari ST, MS-DOS
- Release: 1989; 1990 (Amiga)
- Genre: Wargame
- Mode: Single-player

Red Lightning is a wargame created by Norm Koger and published by Strategic Simulations for the Atari ST and MS-DOS in 1989. An Amiga conversion followed a year later. The game is set in Europe and hypothesizes a Soviet invasion of Western Europe.

Illustrator Marc Ericksen created the Box Art for Red Lightning, which features Soviet T-80 tanks advancing under heavy weather with Mig-29s flying air cover.

== Reception ==
In the November 1989 edition of Games International (Issue 10), John Inglis noted that the menu-driven system "can be a little tedious, as it takes many keystrokes to move you from one part to the next." However, he concluded by giving the game above-average ratings of 4 out of 5 for both gameplay and graphics, saying, "I would [...] recommend it to traditional wargamers."

In the January 1994 edition of Computer Gaming World, M. Evan Brooks stated that Red Lightning's user interface had "serious flaws." While the Atari ST version's mouse-driven user interface was not as flawed, Brooks concluded that "the overall ease of use is sorely lacking in what is supposed to be computer entertainment," giving the game a poor rating of only 2 out of 5.
