= Cytron Masters =

1982 video game

- Developer: Ozark Softscape
- Publisher: Strategic Simulations
- Designer: Danielle Bunten
- Platforms: Apple II, Atari 8-bit
- Release: NA: July-August 1982
- Genre: Strategy
- Modes: Single-player, multiplayer

Cytron Masters is a strategy video game by Danielle Bunten Berry (credited as Dan Bunten) and Ozark Softscape. It was published by Strategic Simulations for the Apple II and Atari 8-bit computers in July or August 1982. Cytron Masters is one of the earliest video games that can be considered a real-time strategy game, or a real-time tactics predecessor to the genre, requiring the players to build up their forces in order to win.

== Gameplay ==
In the game each player takes the role of the commander, represented on-screen in Command Centers located on opposite sides of the screen. Scattered around the screen are eight "generators" that produce energy. The energy produced by these generators is the resource in the game, similar in function to the more tangible resources gathered in modern RTS games. Energy can then be "spent" to produce the Cytrons, robot warriors, as well as using it to move them about, fire, and other duties.

The playfield consists of a twelve by six grid of possible locations, with the command centers at the (1,3) and (12,3) locations. Five different types of Cytrons can be built and moved about the grid. Shooters fire at the closest of any enemy units with a three-space range, mines detonate when an enemy approaches, bunkers absorb damage, and missiles fly up and over the battlefield to detonate at a selected location. The fifth unit, the Commander, relays commands from the Command Centers out to the units in the field.

Gameplay is somewhat chess-like, a battle for position. Bunkers and mines become important along the front lines, protecting friendly units from attack while they are developed forward.

== Reception ==
Mark Botner reviewed the game for Computer Gaming World, and stated that "Cytron Masters is an exciting game offering multiple levels of play with variations to suit the individual: Play on all levels guarantees an action-packed episode of futuristic combat."

Chris Smith reviewed SSI's RapidFire Line in The Space Gamer No. 59, and commented that "Cytron Masters requires a bit of tactical know-how, and its real-time command system gives it a slight arcade feel. I think this is the perfect combination of arcade and board game."

In a 1992 survey of science fiction games, Computer Gaming World gave the title two of five stars.
