= Rollin (video game) =

1995 video game

- Developer(s): SAV Creation
- Publisher(s): Ticsoft
- Writer(s): Michael Riedel
- Platform(s): MS-DOS
- Release: 1995
- Genre(s): Puzzle
- Mode(s): Single-player, multiplayer

Rollin is a puzzle video game written for MS-DOS by Michael Riedel of SAV Creation and published by Ticsoft.

The object of the game is to maneuver a ball through a level in top-down perspective from start to exit. The ball follows the laws of gravity, momentum and conservation of energy. Levels are composed of tiles with various properties and effects. The game has a single player, two player in turn and two player cooperative modes. The controllers supported are keyboard, mouse and joysticks.

Five "episodes" (level packs) were produced, each having 8 levels with a distinct visual theme. Episodes 2+3 and 4+5 were released as Part 1 and Part 2, correspondingly, with 16 levels each. Episode 1 was released as freeware, officially named "friendware" and also known as Part 0, containing 8 levels.

The soundtrack in electronic music genre was composed by Karsten Koch. Each released Part contains a different set of in-game tracks and a common main menu track.

== Gameplay ==
Gameplay screenshot

The player character has been transformed into a ball by an evil scientist and has to roll his way through various mazes also designed by that scientist if he hopes to survive. His goal is to roll his marble around the level, collecting items and gold (in order to buy keys and other items at shops) in order to eventually get to the level's exit.

Obstacles, items and special tiles include monsters, keys, locks, trampolines, acid to destroy some walls, and more.
