= Epidemic! =

1982 video game

- Developer: Strategic Simulations
- Publisher: Strategic Simulations
- Designer: Steven Faber
- Platforms: Apple II, Atari 8-bit, MS-DOS
- Release: 1982
- Genre: Strategy
- Mode: Single-player

Epidemic! is a turn-based strategy game developed by Steven Faber for the Apple II and published by Strategic Simulations in 1982. It was ported to Atari 8-bit computers and MS-DOS. The player attempts to contain the worldwide outbreak of a deadly virus.

== Plot ==
A meteorite crashes into Earth, bringing with it an alien virus. The player must stem the epidemic across 14 regions quickly as possible and with minimal loss of life.

== Gameplay ==
The player has from 15 to 30 turns, with options ranging from inert methods like interferon, to quarantine, to destruction of a region with nuclear weapons.

The game has four difficulty levels, ranging from small controllable scenarios of approximately 20 minutes at level 4, to full one-hour campaigns with severe difficulty at level 1.

== Reception ==
Johnny L. Wilson reviewed the game for Computer Gaming World, and stated that "In conclusion, Epidemic is a good beginning level strategy game with excellent graphics. The game provides a real challenge to constantly better your score by curing the world as fast as you can."

In a 1983 review for Creative Computing, Brian J. Murphy wrote, "The game system is easy to master, and play is smooth," and "The documentation is entertainingly written and supports the program well, but even without the manual and player aid cards, a first time gamer stands a good chance of picking up the rules just by booting the disk and following the prompts."
