= Rebel Charge at Chickamauga =

1987 video game

- Publisher(s): Strategic Simulations
- Platform(s): Amiga, Apple II, Atari 8-bit, Commodore 64, MS-DOS
- Release: 1987
- Genre(s): Wargame

Rebel Charge at Chickamauga is computer wargame published in 1987 by Strategic Simulations.

== Gameplay ==
Rebel Charge at Chickamauga is a game in which the Battle of Chickamauga in the American Civil War is simulated in a turn-based game.

== Reception ==
M. Evan Brooks reviewed the game for Computer Gaming World, and stated that "User-friendly, Chickamauga is an accurate rendition of the Battle of Chickamauga as it began."

Mike Siggins reviewed Rebel Charge at Chickamauga for Games International magazine, and gave it 3 stars out of 5, and stated that "Chickamauga is a good, well balanced game using an established and no doubt familiar system. If the period interests you it should be a recommended purchase, but I am left with a feeling of having to use an old style dial phone when there are push button systems on the market."
