= Combat Leader =

1983 war video game

- Publisher(s): Strategic Simulations
- Platform(s): Atari 8-bit, Commodore 64
- Release: 1983
- Genre(s): Wargame

Combat Leader is a computer wargame published by Strategic Simulations in 1983.

== Gameplay ==
Combat Leader is a game in which the player goes against the computer in a platoon level tactical wargame.

== Reception ==
Floyd Mathews reviewed the game for Computer Gaming World, and stated that "Twentieth century small unit tactics is a very complex subject, and this program realistically portrays the uncertainties and hazards faced by a modern mechanized company commander."
