= Galactic Gladiators =

1982 video game

- Publisher: Strategic Simulations
- Designer: Tom Reamy
- Platforms: Apple II, IBM PC
- Release: 1982
- Genre: Wargame

Galactic Gladiators is a computer wargame published in 1982 by Strategic Simulations for the Apple II and as a self-booting disk for the IBM PC. It was designed by Tom Reamy.

== Gameplay ==
Galactic Gladiators is a game in which the player fights against an alien opponent.

== Reception ==
David Long reviewed the game for Computer Gaming World, and stated that "Easy to learn and fast to play, GG is a great starter game for "arcaders" who've never tried a "wargame" before. But, much like chess, it will take a long time to really feel like you've mastered this game (I sure haven't!) and the possibilities are endless."

Chris Smith reviewed SSI's RapidFire Line in The Space Gamer No. 59, and commented that "The game has two very strong points: secret movement and freshness."
