= Strategy video game =

Video game genre

A strategy video game is a video game genre that emphasizes strategic or tactical planning and decision-making, often involving the indirect control of multiple units and the management of limited resources, rather than the quick reflexes typical of action games.

Strategy video games are commonly divided into two main forms: turn-based strategy (TBS), in which players act in discrete turns, and real-time strategy (RTS), in which gameplay proceeds continuously. Many also incorporate elements such as tactics, diplomacy, economics, or exploration.

Electronic strategy games developed in part from earlier non-digital board games and wargames, and scholars note that the definition of “strategy” in games is not entirely uniform across contexts.

== Typical experience ==
A player must plan a series of actions against one or more opponents, and the reduction of enemy forces is usually a goal. Victory is achieved through superior planning, and the element of chance takes a smaller role. In most strategy video games, the player is given a godlike view of the game world, and indirectly controls game units under their command. Thus, most strategy games involve elements of warfare to varying degrees, and feature a combination of tactical and strategic considerations. In addition to combat, these games often challenge the player's ability to explore or manage an economy.

== Relationship to other genres ==
Even though there are many action games that involve strategic thinking, they are seldom classified as strategy games. A strategy game is typically larger in scope, and its main emphasis is on the player's ability to outthink their opponent. Strategy games rarely involve a physical challenge, and tend to annoy strategically minded players when they do. Compared to other genres such as action or adventure games where one player takes on many enemies, strategy games usually involve some level of symmetry between sides. Each side generally has access to similar resources and actions, with the strengths and weaknesses of each side being generally balanced.

Although strategy games involve strategic, tactical, and sometimes logistical challenges, they are distinct from puzzle games. A strategy game calls for planning around a conflict between players, whereas puzzle games call for planning in isolation. Strategy games are also distinct from construction and management simulations, which include economic challenges without any fighting. These games may incorporate some amount of conflict, but are different from strategy games because they do not emphasize the need for direct action upon an opponent. Nevertheless, some authors consider construction and management simulation games, in particular city-building games, as a part of the wider strategy game genre.

Although strategy games are similar to role-playing video games in that the player must manage units with a variety of numeric attributes, RPGs tend to be about a smaller number of unique characters, while strategy games focus on larger numbers of fairly similar units.

== Game design ==
=== Units and conflict ===
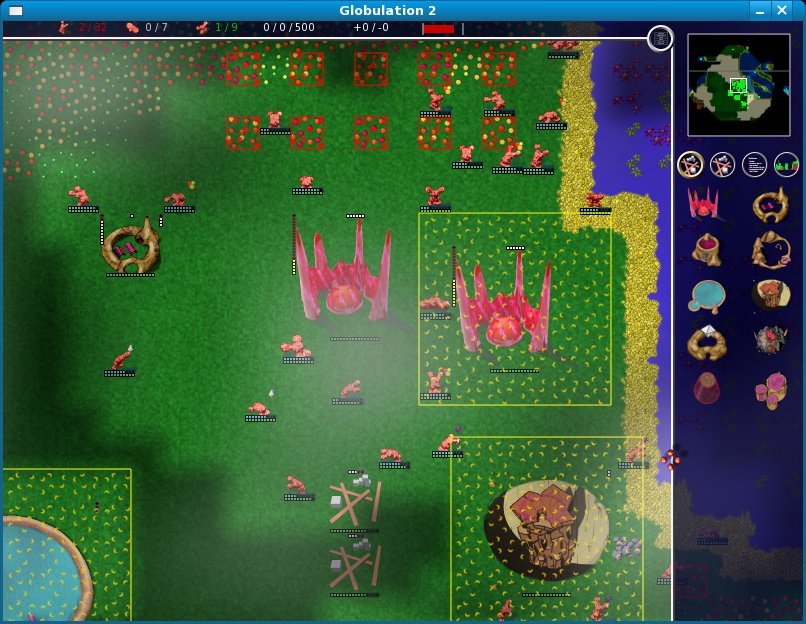
Strategy games give players indirect control over many units in a battlefield. Many games, for example Globulation 2, include other challenges such as building construction.

The player commands their forces by selecting a unit, usually by clicking it with the mouse, and issuing an order from a menu. Keyboard shortcuts become important for advanced players, as speed is often an important factor. Units can typically move, attack, stop, hold a position, although other strategy games offer more complex orders. Units may even have specialized abilities, such as the ability to become invisible to other units, usually balanced with abilities that detect otherwise invisible things. Some strategy games even offer special leader units that provide a bonus to other units. Units may also have the ability to sail or fly over otherwise impassable terrain, or provide transport for other units. Non-combat abilities often include the ability to repair or construct other units or buildings.

Even in imaginary or fantastic conflicts, strategy games try to reproduce important tactical situations throughout history. Techniques such as flanking, making diversions, or cutting supply lines may become integral parts of managing combat. Terrain becomes an important part of strategy, since units may gain or lose advantages based on the landscape. Some strategy games such as Civilization III and Medieval 2: Total War involve other forms of conflict such as diplomacy and espionage. However, warfare is the most common form of conflict, as game designers have found it difficult to make non-violent forms of conflict as appealing.

=== Economy, resources and upgrades ===
Strategy games often involve other economic challenges. These can include building construction, population maintenance, and resource management. Strategy games frequently make use of a windowed interface to manage these complex challenges.

Most strategy games allow players to accumulate resources which can be converted to units, or converted to buildings such as factories that produce more units. The quantity and types of resources vary from game to game. Some games will emphasize resource acquisition by scattering large quantities throughout the map, while other games will put more emphasis on how resources are managed and applied by balancing the availability of resources between players. To a lesser extent, some strategy games give players a fixed quantity of units at the start of the game.

Strategy games often allow the player to spend resources on upgrades or research. Some of these upgrades enhance the player's entire economy. Other upgrades apply to a unit or class of units, and unlock or enhance certain combat abilities. Sometimes enhancements are enabled by building a structure that enables more advanced structures. Games with a large number of upgrades often feature a technology tree, which is a series of advancements that players can research to unlock new units, buildings, and other capabilities. Technology trees are quite large in some games, and 4X strategy games are known for having the largest.

A build order is a linear pattern of production, research, and resource management aimed at achieving a specific and specialized goal. They are analogous to chess openings, in that a player will have a specific order of play in mind, however, the amount of the build order, the strategy around which the build order is built or even which build order is then used varies on the skill, ability and other factors such as how aggressive or defensive each player is.

=== Map and exploration ===
Early strategy games featured a top-down perspective, similar in nature to a board game or paper map. Many later games adopted an isometric perspective. Even with the rise of 3D graphics and the potential to manipulate the camera, games usually feature some kind of aerial view. Very rarely do strategy games show the world from the perspective from an avatar on the ground. This is to provide the player with a big-picture view of the game world, and form more effective strategies.

Exploration is a key element in most strategy games. The landscape is often shrouded in darkness, and this darkness is lifted as a player's units enters the area. The ability to explore may be inhibited by different kinds of terrain, such as hills, water, or other obstructions. Even after an area is explored, that area may become dim if the player does not patrol it. This design technique is called the fog of war, where the player can see the terrain but not the units within the explored area. This makes it possible for enemies to attack unexpectedly from otherwise explored areas.

=== Real-time versus turn-based ===
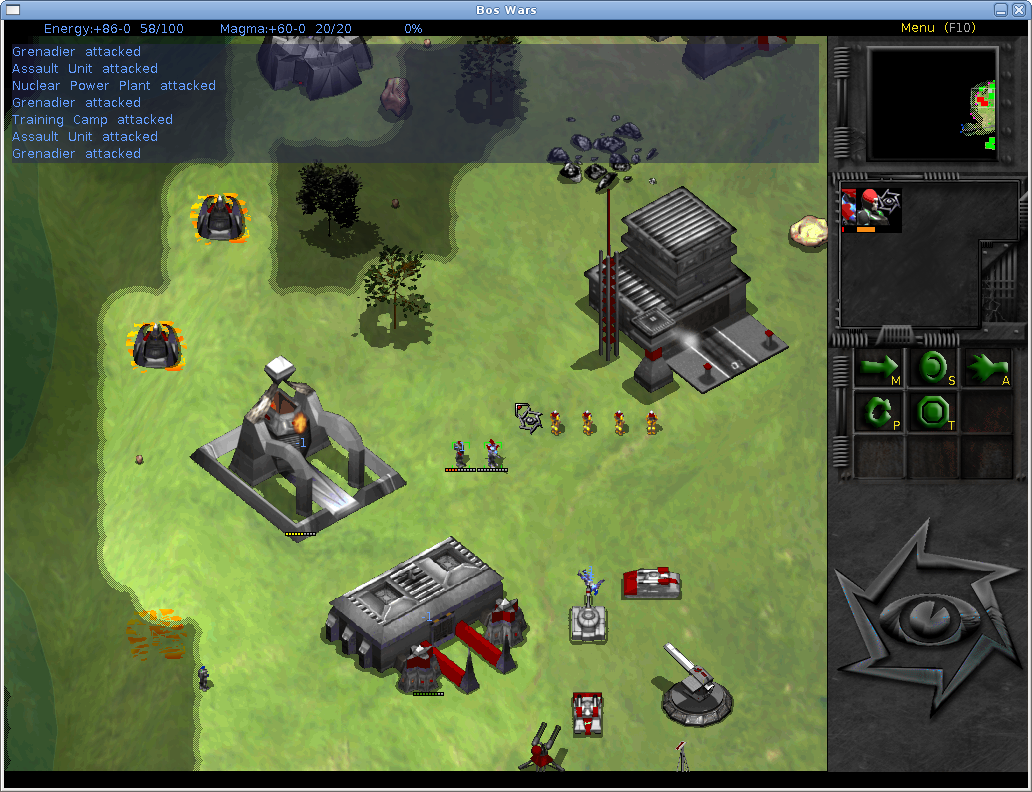
Bos Wars is a real-time strategy game, where events unfold continuously.

Strategy video games are categorized based on whether they offer the continuous gameplay of real-time strategy, or the discrete phases of turn-based strategy. These differences in time-keeping lead to several other differences. Typically, turn-based strategy games have stronger artificial intelligence than real-time strategy games, since the turn-based pace allows more time for complex calculations. But a real-time artificial intelligence makes up for this disadvantage with its ability to manage multiple units more quickly than a human. Overall, real-time strategy games are more action-oriented, as opposed to the abstract planning emphasized in turn-based strategy.

The relative popularity of real-time strategy has led some critics to conclude that more gamers prefer action-oriented games. Fans of real-time strategy have criticized the wait times associated with turn-based games, and praised the challenge and realism associated with making quick decisions in real-time. In contrast, turn-based strategy fans have criticized real-time strategy games because most units do not behave appropriately without orders, and thus a turn-based pace allows players to input more realistic and detailed plans. Game theorists have noted that strategic thinking does not lend itself well to real-time action, and turn-based strategy purists have criticized real-time strategy games for replacing "true strategy" with gameplay that rewards "rapid mouse-clicking". Overall, reviewers have been able to recognize the advantages associated with both of the main types of strategy games.

=== Strategy versus tactics ===
Most strategy video games involve a mix of both strategy and tactics. "Tactics" usually refer to how troops are utilized in a given battle, whereas "strategy" describes the mix of troops, the location of the battle, the commander's larger goals or military doctrine, as well as the act of building up something (a base, economy, etc.). However, there is also a growing subgenre of purely tactical games, which are referred to as real-time tactics, and turn-based tactics. These types of games are sometimes categorized as "strategy" games. Game reviewers and scholars sometimes debate whether they are using terminology such as "tactics" or "strategy" appropriately. Chris Taylor, the designer of Total Annihilation and Supreme Commander, has gone so far as to suggest that real-time strategy titles are more about tactics than strategy. But releases that are considered pure tactical games usually provide players with a fixed set of units, and downplay other strategic considerations such as manufacturing, and resource management. Tactical games are strictly about combat, and typically focus on individual battles, or other small sections in a larger conflict.

=== Settings and themes ===
Strategy games can take place in a number of settings. Depending on the theatre of warfare, releases may be noted as naval strategy games, or space strategy games. A title may be noted for its grand strategic scale, whether the game is real-time, or turn-based. Strategy games also draw on a number of historical periods, including World War II, the medieval era, or the Napoleonic era. Some examples of these are: Hearts of Iron IV, Europa Universalis IV, and Victoria II. Some strategy games are even based in an alternate history, by manipulating and rewriting certain historical facts. It is also common to see games based in science fiction or futuristic settings, as well as fantasy settings.

Some strategy games are abstract, and do not try to represent a world with high fidelity. Although many of these may still involve combat in the sense that units can capture or destroy each other, these games sometimes offer non-combat challenges such as arranging units in specific patterns. However, the vast majority of computerized strategy games are representational, with more complex game mechanics.

=== Single player, multiplayer, and massively multiplayer ===
Strategy games include single-player gameplay, multiplayer gameplay, or both. Single player games will sometimes feature a campaign mode, which involves a series of matches against several artificial intelligence opponents. Finishing each match or mission will advance the game's plot, often with cut scenes, and some games will reward a completed mission with new abilities or upgrades. Hardcore strategy gamers tend to prefer multiplayer competition, where human opponents provide more challenging competition than the artificial intelligence. Artificial intelligence opponents often need hidden information or bonuses to provide a challenge to players.

More recently, massively multiplayer online strategy games have appeared such as Shattered Galaxy from 2001. However, these games are relatively difficult to design and implement compared to other massively multiplayer online games, as the numerous player-controlled units create a larger volume of online data. By 2006, reviewers expressed disappointment with the titles produced thus far. Critics argued that strategy games are not conducive to massively multiplayer gameplay. A single victory cannot have much impact in a large persistent world, and this makes it hard for a player to care about a small victory, especially if they are fighting for a faction that is losing an overall war. However, more recent developers have tried to learn from past mistakes, resulting in Dreamlords from 2007, and Saga from 2008. In 2012, Supercell released Clash of Clans, a mobile strategy video game.

== History ==
The origin of strategy video games is rooted in traditional tabletop strategy games like Chess, Checkers and Go, as well as board and miniature wargaming. The Sumerian Game, an early mainframe game written by Mabel Addis, based on the ancient Sumerian city-state of Lagash, was an economic simulation strategy game.

The first console strategy game was a Risk-like game called Invasion, released in 1972 for the Magnavox Odyssey. Strategic Simulations (SSI)'s Computer Bismarck, released in 1980, was the first historical computer wargame. Companies such as SSI, Avalon Hill, MicroProse, and Strategic Studies Group released many strategy titles throughout the 1980s. Reach for the Stars from 1983 was one of the first 4X strategy games, which expanded upon the relationship between economic growth, technological progress, and conquest. That same year, Nobunaga's Ambition was a conquest-oriented grand strategy wargame with historical simulation elements. The Lords of Midnight combined elements of adventure, strategy and wargames, and won the Crash magazine award for Best Adventure game of 1984, as well as Best Strategy Game of the Year at the Golden Joystick Awards

Real-time strategy elements can be found in Utopia (1982), Dan Bunten's Cytron Masters (1982), Kōji Sumii's Bokosuka Wars (1983), D. H. Lawson and John Gibson's Stonkers and Steven Faber's Epidemic! (both 1983), and Evryware's The Ancient Art of War (1984). However, the genre did not become popular until the release of Herzog Zwei in 1989 and Dune II three years later in 1992. Brett Sperry, the creator of Dune II, coined the name "real-time strategy" to help market the new game genre he helped popularize. Real-time strategy games changed the strategy genre by emphasizing the importance of time management, with less time to plan. Real-time strategy games eventually began to outsell turn-based strategy games. With more than 11 million copies sold worldwide by February 2009, StarCraft (1998) became one of the best-selling games for the personal computer. It has been praised for pioneering the use of unique "factions" in RTS gameplay, and for having a compelling story.

2002's Warcraft III: Reign of Chaos has been an influence on real-time strategy games, especially the addition of role-playing elements and heroes as units. More than the game itself, mods created with the World Editor led to lasting changes and inspired many future strategy games. Defense of the Ancients (DotA), a community-created mod based on Warcraft III, is largely attributed as being the most significant inspiration for the multiplayer online battle arena (MOBA) format. Since the format was tied to the Warcraft property, developers began to work on their own "DOTA-style" games, including Heroes of Newerth (2009), League of Legends (2010), and the mod's standalone sequel, Dota 2 (2013). Blizzard Entertainment, the owner of Warcraft property, developed a game inspired by DotA titled Heroes of the Storm (2015), which features an array of heroes from Blizzard's franchises, including numerous heroes from Warcraft III. Former game journalist Luke Smith called DotA "the ultimate RTS".

Since its first title was released in 2000, the Total War series by the Creative Assembly has sold over 20 million copies, becoming one of the most successful series of strategy games of all time.

== Subgenres ==
=== 4X ===
4X games are a genre of strategy video game in which players control an empire and "explore, expand, exploit, and exterminate". The term was first coined by Alan Emrich in his September 1993 preview of Master of Orion for Computer Gaming World. Since then, others have adopted the term to describe games of similar scope and design.

4X games are noted for their deep, complex gameplay. Emphasis is placed upon economic and technological development, as well as a range of non-military routes to supremacy. Many 4X games also fit into the category of grand strategy. Games can take a long time to complete since the amount of micromanagement needed to sustain an empire scales as the empire grows. 4X games are sometimes criticized for becoming tedious for these reasons, and several games have attempted to address these concerns by limiting micromanagement.

The earliest 4X games borrowed ideas from board games and 1970s text-based computer games. The first 4X games were turn-based, but real-time 4X games are also not uncommon. Many 4X games were published in the mid-1990s, but were later outsold by other types of strategy games. Sid Meier's Civilization and the Total War series are important examples from this formative era, and popularized the level of detail that would later become a staple of the genre. In the new 2000 millennium, several 4X releases have become critically and commercially successful.

=== Grand Strategy ===
Grand strategy games emphasize the management of a nation and the coordination of its resources. Diplomacy and war interact with each other and become the primary means of reshaping the world map consisting of various states. Players use their nation's resources to achieve national goals such as world domination, whether through military might, diplomacy, or economics. Unlike 4X games, Grand strategy games might not include such elements as exploration, but it still can be there. Great examples of Grand Strategy games are the following series of games: Europa Universalis, Hearts of Iron, Crusader Kings.

=== Artillery ===
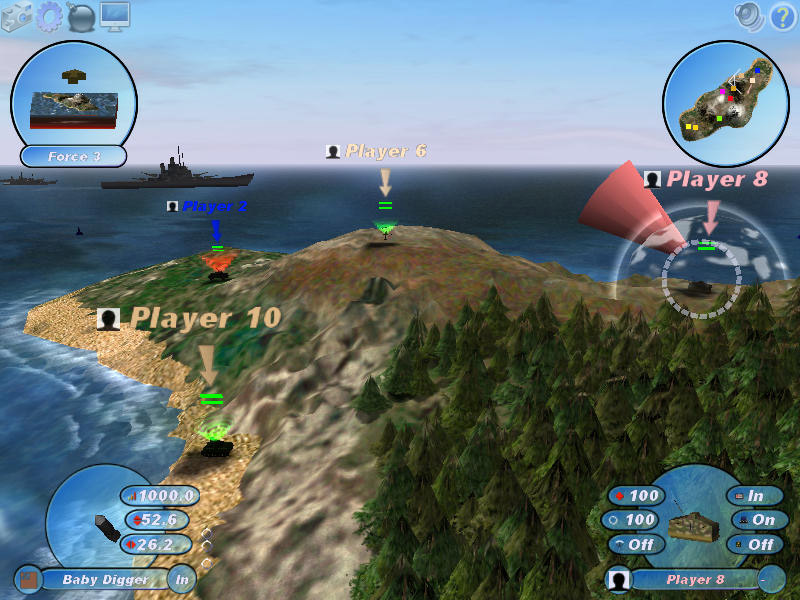
Scorched 3D is an artillery game.

Artillery is the generic name for either early two- or three-player (usually turn-based) computer games involving tanks fighting each other in combat or similar derivative games. Artillery games are among the earliest computer games developed; the theme of such games is an extension of the original uses of computer themselves, which were once used to calculate the trajectories of rockets and other related military-based calculations. Artillery games have been typically described as a type of turn-based tactics game, though they have also been described as a type of "shooting game." Examples of this genre are Pocket Tanks, Hogs of War, Scorched 3D and the Worms series.

Early precursors to the modern artillery-type games were text-only games that simulated artillery entirely with input data values. A BASIC game known simply as Artillery was written by Mike Forman and was published in Creative Computing magazine in 1976. This seminal home computer version of the game was revised in 1977 by M. E. Lyon and Brian West and was known as War 3; War 3 was revised further in 1979 and published as Artillery-3. These early versions of turn-based tank combat games interpreted human-entered data such as the distance between the tanks, the velocity or "power" of the shot fired and the angle of the tanks' turrets.

=== Auto battler (auto chess) ===
Auto battler, also known as auto chess, is a type of strategy game that features chess-like elements where players place characters on a grid-shaped battlefield during a preparation phase, who then fight the opposing team's characters without any further direct input from the player. It was created and popularized by Dota Auto Chess in early 2019, and saw more games in the genre by other studios, such as Teamfight Tactics, Dota Underlords, and Hearthstone Battlegrounds releasing soon after.

=== Multiplayer online battle arena (MOBA) ===
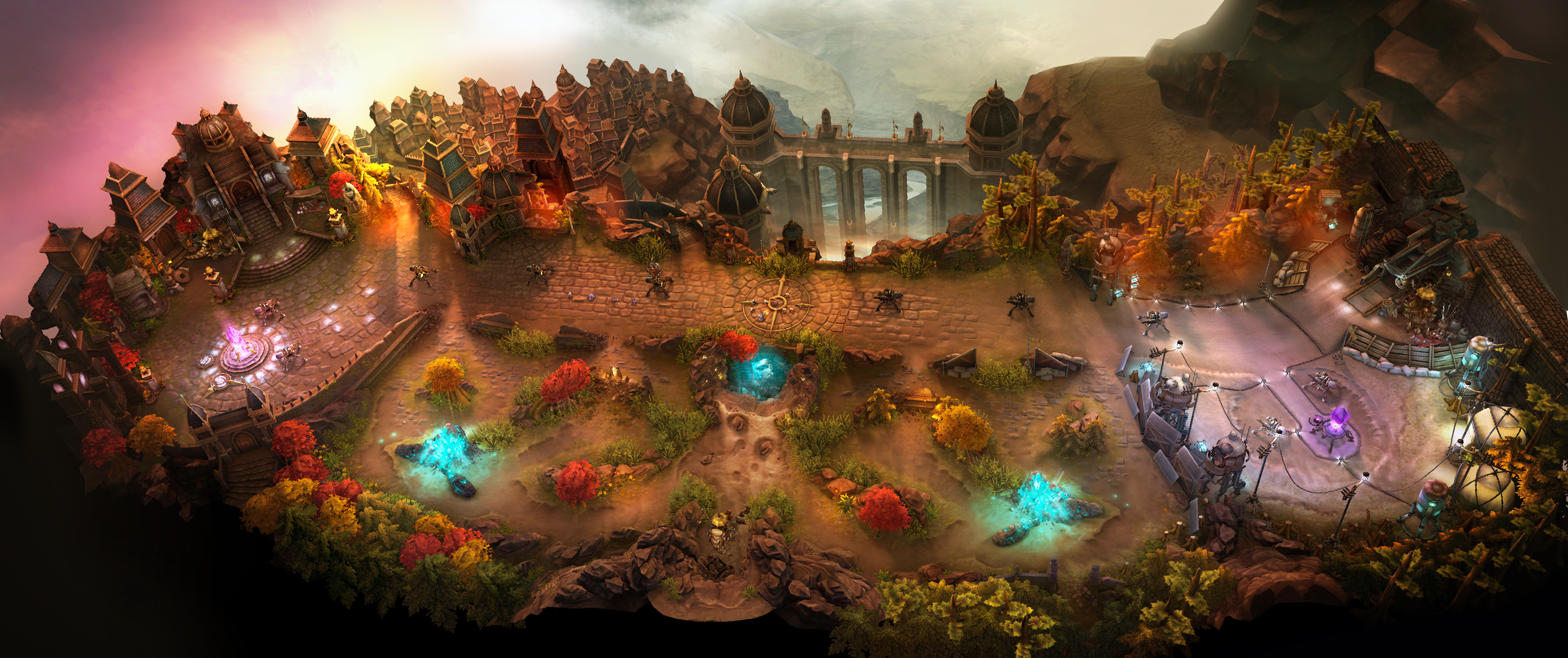
Vainglory is a multiplayer online battle arena game designed for smartphones and tablets.

Multiplayer online battle arena (MOBA) is a genre of strategy video games where two teams of players compete to destroy the opposing team's main structure while defending their own. Players control characters called "heroes" or "champions" with unique abilities, and are aided by computer-controlled units that march along set paths (called "lanes") toward the enemy base. The first team to destroy the enemy's base wins. MOBA games combine elements of real-time strategy, role-playing, and action games, focusing on team coordination, character progression, and fast-paced combat. Unlike traditional real-time strategy games, players do not build structures or units.

The genre gained popularity in the early 2010s, with Defense of the Ancients mod for Warcraft III, League of Legends, Dota 2, Heroes of the Storm, and Smite. MOBA games are well-represented in esports, with prize pools reaching tens of millions of dollars.

=== Construction and management simulation games ===
In management simulation games, players build, expand or manage fictional communities or projects with limited resources. Tycoons, city-building, business simulation and transport management games are considered by some authors as a part of wider subgenre of strategy games, while others consider them as a separate video game genre. Some games of this subgenre, like The Settlers, can include warfare, but this is not an essential element in them. Other strategy video games sometimes incorporate CMS aspects into their game economy, as players must manage resources while expanding their project. For example, base building and resource management in XCOM series.

=== Real-time strategy (RTS) ===
Usually applied only to certain computer strategy games, the moniker real-time strategy (RTS) indicates that the action in the game is continuous, and players will have to make their decisions and actions within the backdrop of a constantly changing game state, and computer real-time strategy gameplay is characterised by obtaining resources, building bases, researching technologies and producing units. Very few non-computer strategy games are real-time; one example is Icehouse.

Some players dispute the importance of strategy in real-time strategy games, as skill and manual dexterity are often seen as the deciding factor in this genre of game. According to Troy Dunniway, "A player controls hundreds of units, dozens of buildings and many different events that are all happening simultaneously. There is only one player, and he can only pay attention to one thing at a time. Expert players can quickly flip between many different tasks, while casual gamers have more problems with this." Ernest Adams goes so far as to suggest that real-time gameplay interferes with strategy. "Strategic thinking, at least in the arena of gameplay, does not lend itself well to real-time action".

Many strategy players claim that many RTS games really should be labeled as "real-time tactical" (RTT) games since the game play revolves entirely around tactics, with little or even no strategy involved. Massively Multiplayer Online Games (MMOG or MMO) in particular have had a difficult time implementing strategy since having strategy implies some mechanism for "winning". MMO games, by their nature, are typically designed to be never-ending. Nevertheless, some games are attempting to "crack the code," so-to-speak, of the true real-time strategy MMOG. One method by which they are doing so is by making defenses stronger than the weapons, thereby slowing down combat considerably and making it possible for players to more carefully consider their actions during a confrontation. Customizable units are another way of adding strategic elements, as long as players are truly able to influence the capabilities of their units. The industry is seeking to present new candidates worthy of being known for "thought strategy" rather than "dexterity strategy".

While Herzog Zwei is regarded as the first true RTS game, the defining title for the genre was Westwood Studios's Dune II, which was followed by their seminal Command & Conquer games. Cavedog's Total Annihilation (1997), Blizzard's Warcraft (1994) series, StarCraft (1998) series, and Ensemble Studios' Age of Empires (1997) series are some of the most popular RTS games.

=== MMORTS ===
Massively multiplayer online real-time strategy games, also known as MMORTS, combine real-time strategy (RTS) with a persistent world. Players often assume the role of a general, king, or other type of figurehead leading an army into battle while maintaining the resources needed for such warfare. The titles are often based in a sci-fi or fantasy universe and are distinguished from single or small-scale multiplayer RTS games by the number of players and common use of a persistent world, generally hosted by the game's publisher, which continues to evolve even when the player is offline.

=== Real-time tactics (RTT) ===
Real-time tactics (abbreviated RTT and less commonly referred to as fixed-unit real-time strategy) is a subgenre of tactical wargames played in real-time simulating the considerations and circumstances of operational warfare and military tactics. It is also sometimes considered a subgenre of real-time strategy, and thus may in this context exist as an element of gameplay or as a basis for the whole game. It is differentiated from real-time strategy gameplay by the lack of resource micromanagement and base or unit building, as well as the greater importance of individual units and a focus on complex battlefield tactics. Example titles include Warhammer: Dark Omen, World In Conflict, the Close Combat series, and early tactical role-playing games such as Bokosuka Wars, and Silver Ghost.

=== Tower defense ===
Tower defense games have a very simple layout. Usually, computer-controlled monsters called creeps move along a set path, and the player must place, or "build" towers along this path to kill the creeps. In some games, towers are placed along a set path for creeps, while in others towers can interrupt creep movement and change their path. In most tower defense games different towers have different abilities such as poisoning enemies or slowing them down. The player is awarded money for killing creeps, and this money can be used to buy more towers, or buy upgrades for a tower such as increased power or range.

=== Turn-based strategy (TBS) ===
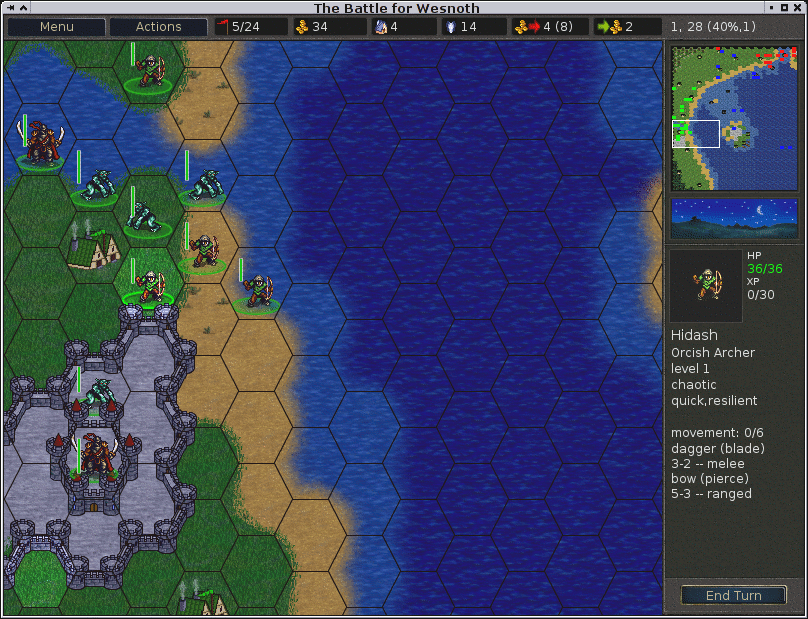
The Battle for Wesnoth is a turn-based strategy game.

The term turn-based strategy (TBS) is usually reserved for certain computer strategy games, to distinguish them from real-time computer strategy games. A player of a turn-based game is allowed a period of analysis before committing to a game action. Examples of this genre include Civilization, Heroes of Might and Magic, Making History, Advance Wars and Master of Orion.

TBS games come in two flavors, differentiated by whether players make their plays simultaneously or take turns. The former types of games are called simultaneously executed TBS games, with Diplomacy a notable example. The latter games fall into the player-alternated TBS games category, and are subsequently subdivided into (a) ranked, (b) round-robin start, and (c) random, the difference being the order under which players take their turns. With (a), ranked, the players take their turns in the same order every time. With (b), the first player is selected according to a round-robin policy. With (c), random, the first player is, of course, randomly selected.

Almost all non-computer strategy games are turn-based; however, the personal computer game market trend has lately inclined more towards real-time games. Some recent games feature a mix of both real-time and turn-based elements thrown together.

=== Turn-based tactics (TBT) ===
Turn-based tactics (TBT), or tactical turn-based (TTB), is a genre of strategy video games that through stop-action simulates the considerations and circumstances of operational warfare and military tactics in generally small-scale confrontations as opposed to more strategic considerations of turn-based strategy (TBS) games.

Turn-based tactical gameplay is characterized by the expectation of players to complete their tasks using only the combat forces provided to them, and usually by the provision of a realistic (or at least believable) representation of military tactics and operations. Examples of this genre include the Wars and X-COM series, as well as tactical role-playing games such as the Jagged Alliance series, Fire Emblem series and Final Fantasy Tactics.

=== Wargames ===
Wargames are a subgenre of strategy video games that emphasize strategic or tactical warfare on a map, as well as historical (or near-historical) accuracy.

The primary gameplay mode in a wargame is usually tactical: fighting battles. Wargames sometimes have a strategic mode where players may plan their battle or choose an area to conquer, but players typically spend much less time in this mode and more time actually fighting. Because it is difficult to provide an intelligent way to delegate tasks to a subordinate, war games typically keep the number of units down to hundreds rather than hundreds of thousands.

Examples of wargames include Koei's Nobunaga's Ambition and Romance of the Three Kingdoms series, Longbow's Hegemony series and several titles by Strategic Simulations, Inc. (SSI) and Strategic Studies Group (SSG).

== Genre hybrids ==
Hybrid strategy games can be viewed as distinct from strategy subgenres in the fact they are not so much iterations or combinations of existing subgenres, but instead seek to combine the strategy genre with completely different genres. Efforts to create such strategy game hybrids were most active in the late 1990s to early 2000's, when first-person shooter (FPS) and real-time strategy (RTS) games were both massively popular. Leading to several notable FPS/RTS hybrid games.

=== Construction and management simulation games ===
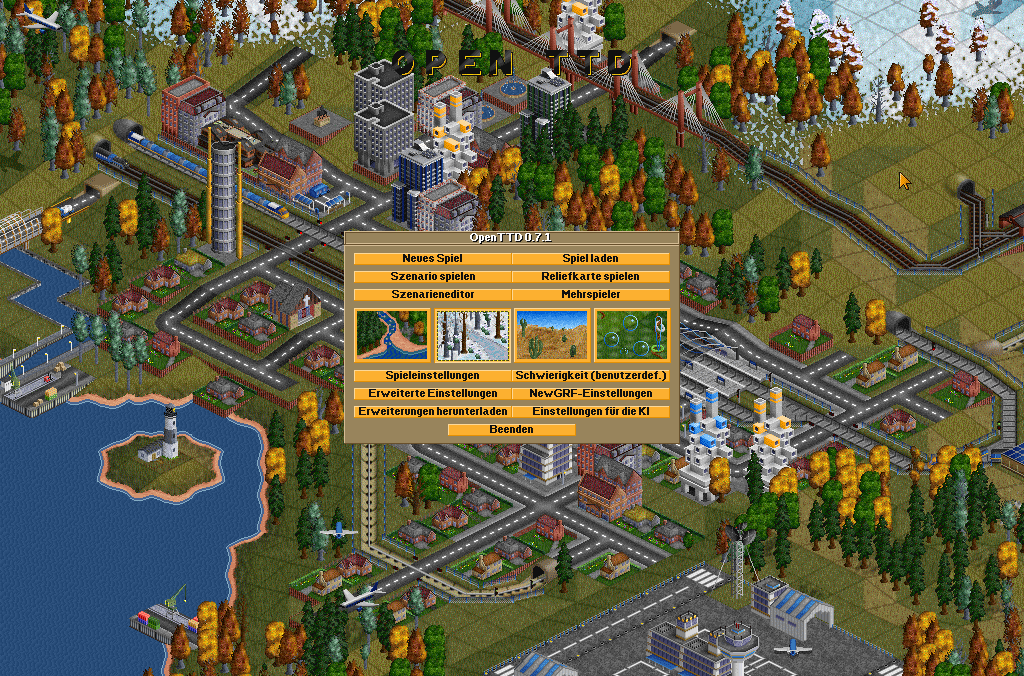
OpenTTD 0.7.1 (a business simulation game) using OpenGFX 0.1.0-alpha5 both under GNU GPL v2.

In management simulation games, players build, expand or manage fictional communities or projects with limited resources. These games differ from other strategy games, in that "the player's goal is not to defeat an enemy, but to build something within the context of an ongoing process." Games in this category are similar to simulation games and are sometimes also called "management games". Such games; including Business simulation games, city-building, and transport management games are considered by some authors as a part of wider subgenre of strategy games, while others consider them as a separate video game genre. Some games of this subgenre, like The Settlers, can include warfare, but this is not an essential element in them. Other strategy video games sometimes incorporate CMS aspects into their game economy, as players must manage resources while expanding their project. For example, base building and resource management in XCOM series.

== See also ==
- List of real-time strategy video games
- List of real-time tactics video games
- List of turn-based strategy video games
- List of turn-based tactics video games
- Micromanagement (computer gaming)
- Rush (computer and video games)
- Technology tree
- Turtle (game term)
