= Release engineering =

Sub-discipline in software engineering

Release engineering, frequently abbreviated as RE or as the clipped compound Releng, is a sub-discipline in software engineering concerned with the compilation, assembly, and delivery of source code into finished products or other software components. Associated with the software release life cycle, it was said by Boris Debic of Google Inc. that release engineering is to software engineering as manufacturing is to an industrial process:

Release engineering is the difference between manufacturing software in small teams or startups and manufacturing software in an industrial way that is repeatable, gives predictable results, and scales well. These industrial style practices not only contribute to the growth of a company but also are key factors in enabling growth.

The importance of release engineering in enabling growth of a technology company has been repeatedly argued by John O'Duinn and Bram Adams. While it is not the goal of release engineering to encumber software development with a process overlay, it is often seen as a sign of organizational and developmental maturity.

Modern release engineering is concerned with several aspects of software production:

Identifiability
Being able to identify all of the source, tools, environment, and other components that make up a particular release.
Reproducibility
The ability to integrate source, third party components, data, and deployment externals of a software system in order to guarantee operational stability.
Consistency
The mission to provide a stable framework for development, deployment, audit and accountability for software components.
Agility
The ongoing research into what are the repercussions of modern software engineering practices on the productivity in the software cycle, e.g. continuous integration and push on green initiatives.

Release engineering is often the integration hub for more complex software development teams, sitting at the cross between development, product management, quality assurance and other engineering efforts, also known as DevOps. Release engineering teams are often cast in the role of gatekeepers (e.g. at Facebook, Google, Microsoft) for certain critical products where their judgement forms a parallel line of responsibility and authority in relation to production releases (pushes).

Frequently, tracking of changes in a configuration management system or revision control system is part of the domain of the release engineer. The responsibility for creating and applying a version numbering scheme into software—and tracking that number back to the specific source files to which it applies—often falls onto the release engineer. Producing or improving automation in software production is usually a goal of the release engineer. Gathering, tracking, and supplying all the tools that are required to develop and build a particular piece of software may be a release engineering task, in order to reliably reproduce or maintain software years after its initial release to customers.

While most software engineers, or software developers, do many or all of the above as a course of their work, in larger organizations the specialty of the release engineer can be applied to coordinate disparate source trees, projects, teams, and components. This frees the developers to implement features in the software and also frees the quality assurance engineers to more broadly and deeply test the produced software.

The release engineer may provide software, services, or both to software engineering and software quality assurance teams. The software provided may include build tools, assembly, or other reorganization scripts which take compilation output and place them into a pre-defined tree structure, and even to the authoring and creation of installers for use by test teams or by the ultimate consumer of the software. The services provided may include software build (compilation) automation, automated test integration, results reporting, and production of or preparation for software delivery systems—e.g., in the form of electronic media (CDs, DVDs) or electronic software distribution mechanisms.

== Related disciplines ==
- Application release automation
- Application lifecycle management
- Build automation
- Continuous integration
- Change management
- Packaging & Deployment
- Porting - Product Line Engineering includes porting of a software product from one platform to other.
- Release management
- Software configuration management - Although release engineering is sometimes considered part of Software Configuration Management, the latter, being a tool or a process used by the Release Engineer, is actually more of a subset of the roles and responsibilities of the typical Release Engineer.
- Software deployment
- Software release life cycle
- Software versioning
