= Global Conquest =

1992 video game

- Developer: Ozark Softscape
- Publisher: Microplay Software
- Designer: Danielle Bunten Berry
- Composer: David Warhol
- Platform: DOS
- Release: NA: 1992
- Genre: Strategy
- Mode: Multiplayer

Global Conquest is a video game published by Microplay Software in 1992 for IBM PC compatibles. It is a version of Command HQ with numerous gameplay upgrades and a multi-player mode supported via modems.

== Plot ==
Global Conquest is a strategy video game in which the player finds territories and then tries to take over the world through strategy and management of military and economic resources.

The game always involves four opponents, which can be controlled by the computer or human players, using play via modem. The world is generated completely for every game, with the environment composed of features including oceans, plains, forests, swamps, and mountains, to which the players add units such as infantry, armor, submarines, airplanes, battleships, and aircraft carriers. Players begin with a spy unit, and can create more, which has the ability to steal secrets from opponent and view the world at wide range. A player uses a powerful Comcen and will be eliminated from the game upon losing the Comcen. A player collects cities, also known as burbs, which create units and financially support these units with money generated into the treasury every turn.

As with Bunten's earlier game M.U.L.E., Global Conquest is designed to balance gameplay between players. Random events are adjusted so that the player in first place is never lucky and the last-place player is never unlucky.

== Reception ==
In 1992 and 1994 surveys of science fiction games, Computer Gaming World gave Global Conquest four-plus stars out of five, stating that its "main strength is modem play coupled with detailed military operations". The magazine later named it one of 1992's best wargames. The game was reviewed in 1993 in Dragon #189 by Hartley, Patricia, and Kirk Lesser in "The Role of Computers" column. The reviewers gave the game 4 out of 5 stars.
