= DTAP =

DTAP may refer to:

- DTaP, a vaccine for diphtheria, tetanus and acellular pertussis
- DTAP, a software development approach
- Direct Transfer Application Part (DTAP), a radio telecommunication protocol for GSM or CDMA
- Direct internet TAP
- DTAP, a three-person group of Vietnamese musicians and record producers
