= Subtrade =

1993 video game

- Developer(s): Century Interactive
- Publisher(s): Boeder Software
- Designer(s): Felix Unger; Niels Kokkelink
- Platform(s): Amiga, MS-DOS
- Release: 1993 (Amiga); 1994 (MS-DOS)
- Genre(s): Turn-based strategy
- Mode(s): Single-player, multiplayer

Subtrade: Return to Irata is a multiplayer video game developed in 1993 by the German developer Century Interactive. It is a clone of the Atari 8-bit game M.U.L.E. designed by Dan Bunten and published by Electronic Arts in 1983. Subtrade was originally written for the Amiga, and later ported to MS-DOS.

== Gameplay ==
Like M.U.L.E., the game is about four colonists (players) building up an economy on the planet Irata (Atari spelled backwards). The objective is to become the richest colonist within twelve game turns, while also attempting to improve the overall health of the colony.

In contrast to M.U.L.E., the setting is transferred to a sub-oceanic world. The most notable change in game play is the addition of a fifth choice of how to outfit the labour element. The new type allows the player to build his own labour elements (M.U.L.E.s, or in this case, turtles), so that the player won't have to buy them from the store.

== See also ==
- Traders (video game)
- Planet M.U.L.E.
