= Rollout.io =

- Industry: Software, Analytics, Mobile
- Founded: 2014
- Headquarters: Tel Aviv, Israel
- Key people: Erez Rusovsky, CEO; Eyal Keren, CTO

Rollout.io provides a mobile software development kit (SDK) that enables feature flagging for mobile apps, allowing developers to remotely control the deployment of new features. The SDK currently supports native iOS apps written in Swift or Objective-C. It supports continuous deployment, gradual rollouts, A/B testing, and the entire software development lifecycle.

== History ==
Rollout was founded by Erez Ruzovsky and Eyal Keren in 2014. The company launched its product at TechCrunch Disrupt San Francisco 2015.

In October 2015, Rollout closed a $2 million Series A funding round led by Canaan Partners Israel. Additional investors included Plus Ventures, 2B Angels, and Star Farm Ventures.

In February 2016, Rollout announced additional funding from Sweet Capital in the amount of $1 million.

In April 2017, Rollout launched a new product called ROX.

In June 2019 Rollout was acquired by CloudBees.

== Products ==
Rollout currently has one product called ROX, a continuous feature delivery system for mobile.

== Difference to well-known rollout library ==
This company and its products should not be confused with the older and widely used rollout open source software library, which has been in development and is used by FetLife and other contributors since 2010.
