= Planet M.U.L.E. =

2009 video game

- Developer: Turborilla
- Producer: Blue Systems
- Designer: Danielle Bunten Berry
- Artist: Sven Ruthner
- Platforms: Windows, Mac OS X, Linux
- Release: Initial: 2009; Latest Version (1.4.2): December 18, 2025
- Genre: Turn-based strategy
- Mode: Multiplayer

Planet M.U.L.E. is an online multiplayer strategy game by Swedish studio Turborilla. It is a remake of the 1983 video game M.U.L.E.

== Gameplay ==
The gameplay of Planet M.U.L.E. closely follows that of the original M.U.L.E.. Improvements over the original include improved, animated graphics and network play over the Internet. However, in the original game, the different characters had different advantages during gameplay (for example, Packers were better at producing food), whereas in Planet M.U.L.E. there are no advantages to choosing one character type versus another. The game is available for Microsoft Windows, Mac OS X, and Linux.

== Development ==
The game was initially produced as an unofficial remake, though early on the developers sought and obtained the consent of Melanie Bunten Stark, daughter of M.U.L.E.'s designer Danielle Bunten Berry.

== See also ==
- Subtrade
- Traders (video game)
