= Sparkle (software) =

Software framework for macOS

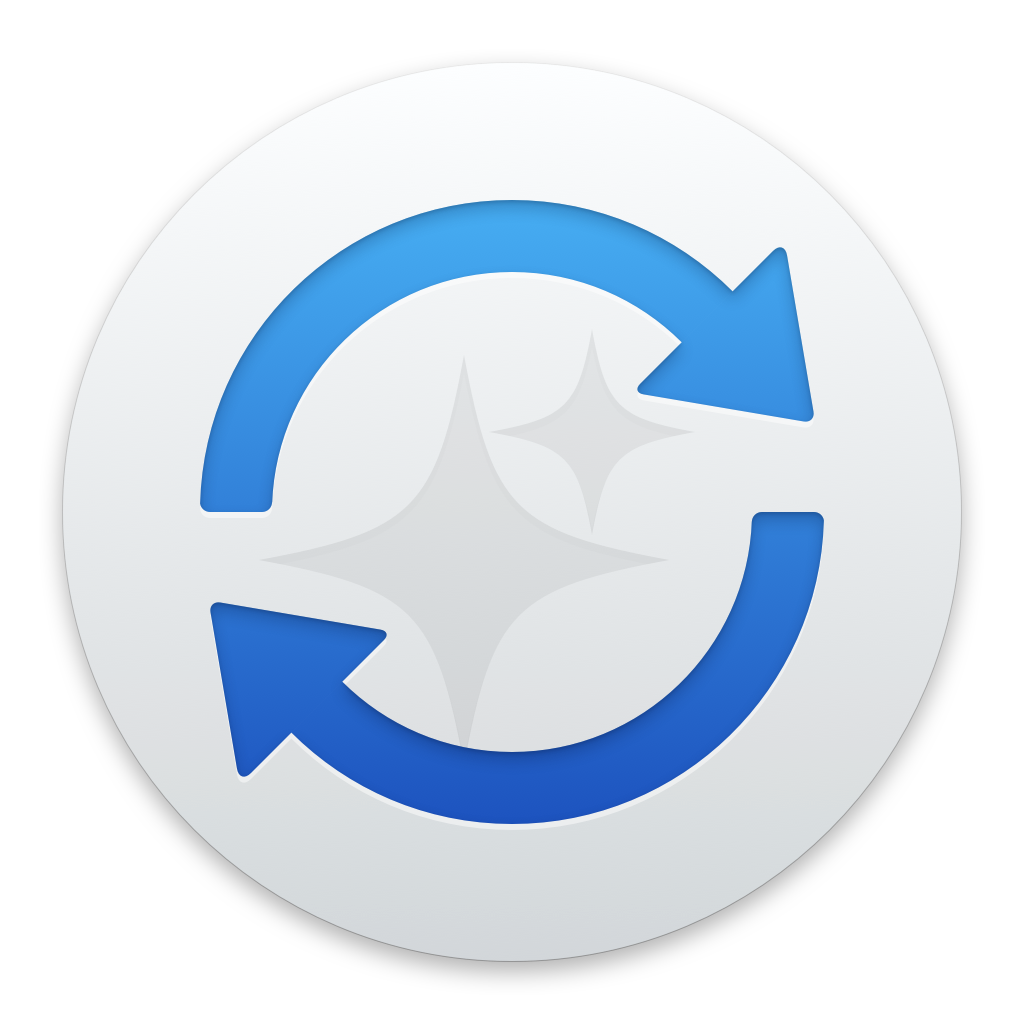

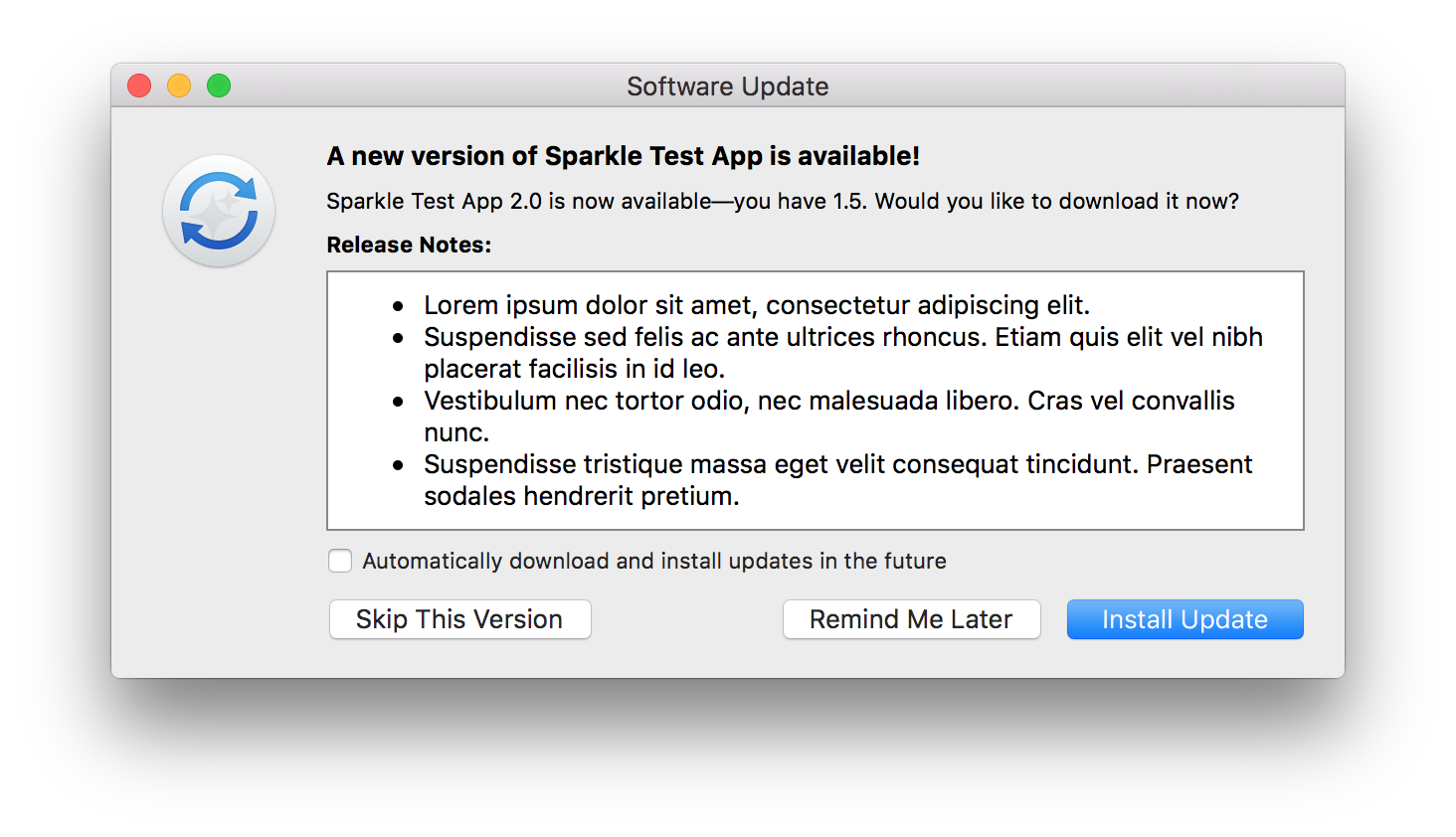
- Sparkle's Test App showing a software update window
- Original author: Andy Matuschak
- Developer: Sparkle Project (2014–present)
- Initial release: January 9, 2006
- Stable release: 2.6.0 / March 15, 2024; 22 months ago
- Repository: github.com/sparkle-project/Sparkle
- Written in: Objective-C, Swift
- Operating system: macOS
- Type: Software update
- License: MIT License
- Website: sparkle-project.org

Sparkle is an open-source software framework for macOS designed to simplify updating software for the end user of a program. Sparkle's primary means of distributing updates is through "appcasting," a term coined for the practice of using an RSS enclosure to distribute updates and release notes.

== History ==
Sparkle 0.1 (beta) was released in January 2006 by Andy Matuschak to provide apps "instant self-update" functionality, which very few applications had at the time.

In August 2009, Sparkle added support for delta updates for installing smaller and faster incremental updates. This was first used to update WebKit's nightly builds.

In 2016, Radek discovered a man-in-the-middle attack vulnerability in applications that use Sparkle to receive updates through an unencrypted channel.
