= Traders (video game) =

1991 video game

- Developer(s): André Wüthrich
- Publisher(s): Merit Software
- Platform(s): Amiga, Atari ST, MS-DOS
- Release: 1991
- Genre(s): Business simulation

Traders is a business simulation game with a science fiction setting. It was created by André Wüthrich and published by Merit software in 1991. Traders was inspired by the 1983 video game M.U.L.E. and was released for MS-DOS, Atari ST, and Amiga. Up to four players control characters, aliens known as Plubbers, attempting to make the most money in a commercial competition. Players grow fields, sell products, and raid other players.

== See also ==
- Subtrade
- Planet M.U.L.E.
