= Robot Rascals =

1986 video game

- Developer(s): Ozark Softscape
- Publisher(s): Electronic Arts
- Designer(s): Danielle Bunten Berry
- Artist(s): Alan Watson
- Platform(s): Apple II, Commodore 64, MS-DOS.
- Release: NA: 1986; EU: 1986
- Genre(s): Party
- Mode(s): Multiplayer

Robot Rascals is a hybrid digital/analog game by Ozark Softscape and published by Electronic Arts in 1986 for the Apple II, Commodore 64, and MS-DOS. Robot Rascals is a multiplayer-only scavenger hunt for people at a single computer using physical cards as part of the game. It was designed by Danielle Bunten Berry (credited as Dan Bunten).

== Gameplay ==
The player controls a robot, for which they can select the color, and goes on a scavenger hunt. The game comes with set of cards, which are to be distributed to the other players. They determine which items they need to find before they get "home". The first player to find all their items indicated on the cards wins. The game includes facilities to swap cards with other players.

Each turn, a player gets a pre-determined amount of fuel to do their scavenging. Each item is randomly placed on the map and it is up to the player to find that item, some which are even in bodies of water, such as a lake. Each time every player has gone through their respective turns, a special message displays telling the player what advantage they have that turn (e.g. faster movement, free teleports, etc.) or disadvantage (e.g. no new shields, no teleports, etc.). The player's robot can also find the items their opponents have in order to prevent them from winning the game. Opponents may also steal items from the player when they have no shields.

There are no computer players in the game, so it must be played with other people. There are three levels of difficulty. The easy level results in all advantages coming up, the middle difficulty has some disadvantages with the advantages and robots can also get damaged (e.g. if it walks through the swamps or on the rocks). The difficult level has more disadvantages (such as no home), damages are more frequent and there are more options for robots (i.e. camouflaged color).

== Reception ==
Bunten said of Robot Rascals: "the sales that EA was able to generate (despite a worthy marketing effort) were disappointing. It didn't have a solo-play option was everyone's rationale for the 'failure'. I can't argue with that but I also think the fact that it didn't have an identifiable 'genre' or audience certainly didn't help." Brian Moriarty said in his tribute to Dani Bunten: "[Robot Rascals] took the multiplayer option to a provocative new extreme. Not only did Robot Rascals have no single-player mode, it actually required the participation of no less than four human players. Daringly billed as a 'family game,' this peculiar fusion of turn-based action and strategy, augmented by a deck of real playing cards, received a polite but puzzled critical reception, and was carefully ignored by everybody else."

Info gave the Commodore 64 version four stars out of five, describing Robot Rascals as "a cute game" and approving of the graphics and sound. The magazine recommended it to families looking for a game to play together. Jasper Sylvester of Computer Gaming World praised Robot Rascals as "beautifully designed and packaged". The game's randomness, between the computer's events and the external deck of cards, were said to feel like a Looney Tunes cartoon. The considerable number of options and strategies available to each player were a highlight of the game, including alternate victory conditions on the Advanced level. The magazine's Charles Ardai stated that the game's "charming blend of strategy and luck makes this ... unusually enjoyable". Compute! favorably cited the distinctive personalities and appearances of the robots, and stated that "the whole family, including the three-year-olds, can play Robot Rascals".
