= Modem Wars =

1988 video game

- Developer: Ozark Softscape
- Publisher: Electronic Arts
- Designer: Danielle Bunten
- Platforms: Commodore 64, MS-DOS
- Release: 1988: C64; 1989: MS-DOS
- Genres: Real-time tactics, Real-time strategy
- Modes: Single-player, multiplayer

Dan Bunten's Modem Wars is a real-time tactics game developed by Ozark Softscape and published by Electronic Arts in 1988 for the Commodore 64. A version for MS-DOS was released in 1989.

Modem Wars is played over a modem connection between two machines (via telephone or null modem serial connection), with both players controlling a group of robotic units trying to eliminate the opponent's command center. The game includes fog of war, varied unit types, terrain, and formations, which are now standard in the genre.

The game has a replay feature, referred to as a "game film". A separate utility allows replays to be uploaded to bulletin board systems for sharing.

== Gameplay ==
Start of a standard scrimmage game (C64)

Each player is presented with a map of which they control the lower half. Across the center is a line, below which they can set up their units. Each unit which crosses this line gains a point. If the ComCen crosses it, many additional points are scored. A second line is three quarters of the way up the screen; crossing it with units gives additional points. Crossing it with the ComCen is one way to win the game.

The map is made up of multiple types of terrain. Most of the space is clear, but there are also woods, which slow movement and reduce visibility, and hills, which slow movement and allow units atop them to have a small range and damage bonus, while those climbing have a small damage penalty.

Optionally, a Recycler space can be made available, which will regenerate destroyed units. A recycled unit must be moved off the Recycler for another unit to appear, and it can be blocked by enemy units. There are three options: None, Half, and Full; Half will recycle only half the units you've lost.

The bulk of the player's army consists of Grunts, which have respectable capabilities. There is a modest contingent of Riders, which are faster than Grunts, but which have less firepower and armor. In total, there are just enough Grunts and Riders to stretch all the way across the width of the screen. Next is a small contingent of Boomers, which are artillery pieces. They have longer range and do significant damage to other units except other Boomers. Each of the three Spies is a fast, rugged unit with extended range sensors, but no weapons, which are useful for finding enemy units, especially the ComCen. Spies are also very useful for blocking the enemy Recycler, if present. Lastly is the Command Center, aka the Quarterback, aka the ComCen. The ComCen is the player's seat in the battle. It has a limited number of missiles for self-defense, heavy armor, and a radar screen which is capable of spotting enemy spies. If it uses its missiles, it becomes visible on the main map and enemy radar screen for several seconds. The ComCen also carries a small number of drones, which are frequently used against a discovered enemy ComCen. The drones are remotely piloted bombs (similar in concept to a cruise missile) and had limited fuel before they would explode. A player losing on points could in effect, throw a "Hail Mary" by piloting remaining drones to the enemy ComCen to knock it out. Destroying the enemy ComCen is another way to win.

Units can be collected into groups for easier management.

Units also have two special modes of operation. First is Digging In. A dug-in unit deals additional damage at longer range and takes less damage from enemy fire, but can't move. It takes a few seconds to dig in or out, though units can start the game dug in. The second mode is Shadow mode, which reduces the distance at which other units can see it; however, while in this mode, it cannot see or shoot. The ComCen cannot use either of these modes.

There are three ways to win the game: getting the player's ComCen across the opposing goal line, 3/4 of the way across the screen; knocking out the enemy ComCen; and having the highest score when time runs out.

Points are scored by sending units across the middle and the goal lines.

== Development ==
The game was developed under the title Sport of War. Computer Gaming World noted this was the easiest way to understand the game, saying: "You play the game as a wargame, but you accumulate points as if it were a sports game". The name was changed to Modem Wars to call attention to how the game is intended to be played against other humans via modem. The computer AI opponent is referred to as a "solo trainer", and CGW recommended against buying the game for those planning to only play against the computer.

Modem Wars uses 4-byte packets for each "move", deltas to determine game states, and storage of those deltas to allow for after-game replays.

== Reception ==
Reception

Review score
Publication	Score
Computer Gaming World	2.5/5

In Computer Gaming World's review from February 1989, Daniel Hockman noted designer Danielle Bunten Berry's intentions for the game:

Dan would like us to believe that Modem Wars is "a wargame for the rest of us". That is, Modem Wars is a fast moving game that does not get bogged down in the minutiae of detail so often associated with wargames. Dan feels that Modem Wars is for those gamers who want to "play war" but are turned off by the detailed rules of the typical wargame.

In a 1992 survey of science fiction games, Computer Gaming World gave the title three of five stars. A 1994 survey of strategic space games set in the year 2000 and later gave the game two-plus stars out of five, stating that "it may have been ahead of its time". The magazine in 1996 ranked it sixth on a list of the most innovative computer games.

In 2004, Scott Sharkey of 1up.com compared Modem Wars to the Sega Genesis real-time strategy game Herzog Zwei, saying it was perhaps "the closest predecessor".
