= The Seven Cities of Gold (video game) =

1984 video game

- Ariaolsoft C64 cover (EA)
- Developer: Ozark Softscape
- Publishers: NA: Electronic Arts; EU: Ariolasoft
- Designer: Danielle Bunten Berry
- Programmers: Atari 8-bit Bill Bunten; Danielle Bunten Berry; Jim Rushing; Alan Watson
- Platforms: Amiga, Apple II, Atari 8-bit, Commodore 64, IBM PC, Mac
- Release: 1984: Atari, Apple II, C64; June 1985: IBM PC; 1986: Amiga, Mac
- Genre: Strategy
- Mode: Single-player

The Seven Cities of Gold is a strategy video game created by Danielle Bunten Berry (credited as Dan Bunten) and Ozark Softscape and published by Electronic Arts in 1984. It was originally developed for the Atari 8-bit computers and released simultaneously for Apple II and Commodore 64. Conversions followed for IBM PC compatibles (1985, as self-booting disk), then Mac and Amiga (1986).

The player takes the role of a late 15th-century explorer for the Spanish Empire, setting sail to the New World in order to explore the map and interact with the natives in order to win gold and please the Spanish court. The name derives from the "seven cities" of Quivira and Cíbola that were said to be located somewhere in the Southwest United States. It is considered to be one of the earliest open world video games.

== Gameplay ==
The player's ship in port (Atari 8-bit)

The game begins with the player having been given an exploration fleet by the Spanish crown, consisting of four ships, one hundred men, and some trade goods. The screen shows a 2D horizontally scrolling representation of a town in Spain with the player's home, a palace, a pub, and an outfitters. The player can walk about the town with the joystick and enter the buildings to interact with them via menus. Walking into the outfitters brings up a menu for buying supplies, supplies, crew, and trade goods.

Most of the game is played on a game screen with a scrolling top-down map in the center and a number of status displays surrounding it. After leaving port the display switches to this map, and the player guides the ship to the New World. At any point the player can bring up a menu with contents based on the player's current location. For instance, if the menu is brought up while on the ship, the items allow you to view the map, or "drop stuff off", the later selection allowing exploration parties to be created by dropping off men and supplies from the ships. When the player is on land as part of an exploration party, the same menu item creates a fort when men are dropped off in it.

The player's ship has arrived at an unexplored area (Amiga)

Upon arriving in the new world, the player can explore the coastline, set up missionaries and forts, and interact with the native peoples. Approaching the villages results in the map zooming in to show the village, represented by four buildings, and the natives moving about. In the center is the village chieftain, approaching him and opening the menu allows trade for gold and food. The player has the option to peacefully trade with or conquer the natives, and can (with the right choices and luck) sometimes convert them, turning the village into a mission.

The natives can be attacked simply by moving onto them. A few accidental killings is acceptable to the village, and sometimes unavoidable, but too many and the natives will become hostile and attack the party. In many cases, the Spanish can overwhelm the natives, who will eventually give up fighting and allow the Spanish to plunder the town. Ambushes are also common, between the towns.

Much of Seven Cities of Gold was influenced by historical accounts of the era. Interactions with the natives could be peaceful or hostile, or become hostile due to the language barrier. While it could be assumed that the goal of the game is to return with riches from the New World, there really are no goals at all. The game has no scoring system and provides the player with feedback from the King, but no interference, if they slaughter the natives. According to Bunten, from an interview in Antic:

The peaceful approach really works best. I have not used a totally depraved approach and won. You've got to have some friends somewhere. If something goes wrong, you need a friendly mission where you can go back and not have to worry about an insurrection or something. A place you can return to and know that there will be food, for example. You need a series of these relatively safe places even if you are going on a conquest mission. If you continually abuse the natives you will eventually see a message from the king saying 'Don't treat the natives so badly. But keep the gold coming'. This double standard is straight out of history.

The size of the New World was one of the concepts that was integrated into the design; the land had to be detailed and diverse. As a result, data storage and retrieval became a major issue, particularly as the developers did not want lengthy load times to interfere with the game. As described by Bunten: "Our only way out was to use technologies we didn't have until we were forced to invent them". The game used a streaming system to allow the map to be loaded in without interrupting game play. The game ships with a single "world" closely modeled on the real one, including details as small as the Florida Keys and most well-known rivers. The game also includes a world creating engine that allows the user to build a truly new New World, saving it to a user supplied disk.

Game maps include one or more "lost cities" that are hidden by a mountain icon in locations that are typically far from other land masses. Explorers that stumble on one of these hidden cities will be greeted with the message "Sir, we have discovered a lost city". Inhabitants of this type of village are docile and run from the player and when the chief of the village is approached, the game will inform the player that "We may take what we want as tribute!" and the user will be able to acquire a sizable amount of gold without having to trade.

== Ports ==
Bunten considered the version for the Atari 8-bit computers to be the only "full" version, while the others were ports of which Bunten said "we did the best we could with what we had". Versions for the Commodore 64 and Apple II were released soon after in the same year, followed by the Mac and Amiga in 1985 and IBM PC compatibles in 1987.

== Reception ==
In 1984, COMPUTE!'s James V. Trunzo called Seven Cities "a riveting new adventure game ... a graphically enhanced strategy game that challenges and educates as well as entertain", and noted its ability to generate new maps. In 1985 Compute!'s Gazette's Gregg Keizer wrote that "this exceptional game" let him fulfill his childhood fantasy of exploring the Amazon: "Fantasies and worlds to explore. What more could you want?"

Seven Cities of Gold had sold over 100,000 copies by the time it won the "Strategy Game of the Year" award in Computer Gaming World's 1985 reader poll. In 1996, Computer Gaming World ranked Seven Cities of Gold as the 61st best game of all time, stating that "Ozark Softscape's fantastic game of New World exploration offended some with its accurate treatment of autochthonous tribes".

== Legacy ==
In 1993, a new version was released for MS-DOS. It is more a reconceptualization of the gameplay than a simple cosmetic makeover. The game is set up as a tier of goals that must be accomplished. For example, the first goal is to establish one mission, one colony, and three forts in the space of ten voyages. Computer Gaming World in 1993 stated that the changes in the VGA remake of the game were improvements. The magazine concluded that "Seven Cities of Gold is still the fresh, simple, playable game that broke ground in the early days of computer gaming".

Seven Cities of Gold, Commemorative Edition won the 1993 Origins Award for Best Military or Strategy Computer Game.

== See also ==
- Heart of Africa, a similar game from Ozark Softscape
