= Computer Quarterback =

1981 video game

- Developer: LDW Software (ports)
- Publisher: Strategic Simulations
- Designer: Danielle Bunten Berry
- Platforms: Apple II, Atari 8-bit, Commodore 64
- Release: 1981: Apple; 1984: Atari, C64
- Genre: Sports

Computer Quarterback is an American football simulation video game written for the Apple II by Danielle Bunten Berry (credited as Dan Bunten) and published in 1981 by Strategic Simulations. Ports to the Atari 8-bit computers and Commodore 64 were released in 1984. Add-on disks for new football seasons were also sold by SSI.

== Gameplay ==
Computer Quarterback is a game in which a statistics-based football game features both playbooks for both semi-pro and professional American football.

== Development ==
Danielle Berry developed Computer Quarterback originally to play with friends on the computer at their workplace. She later used a minicomputer to convert the game's code from FORTRAN to BASIC for the Apple II. Afterward, Berry sent the game to Strategic Simulations requesting that the company publish it. Berry selected the corporation based on the presentation of its first game, the 1980 Computer Bismarck. The wargame's professional packaging, which differed from the zipper storage bags commonly used at the time, convinced her of the producers' competency.

== Reception ==
Wyatt Lee reviewed the game for Computer Gaming World, and stated that "Team Data Disks for individual seasons have been marketed through the company catalog and this is a very playable game."
