= Development, testing, acceptance and production =

Phased approach of software testing and deployment

Development, testing, acceptance and production (DTAP) is a phased approach to software testing and deployment. The four letters in DTAP denote the following common steps:

1. Development: The program or component is developed on a development system. This development environment might have no testing capabilities.
2. Testing: Once the software developer thinks it is ready, the product is copied to a test environment, to verify it works as expected. This test environment is supposedly standardized and in close alignment with the target environment.
3. Acceptance: If the test is successful, the product is copied to an acceptance test environment. During the acceptance test, the customer will test the product in this environment to verify whether it meets their expectations.
4. Production: If the customer accepts the product, it is deployed to a production environment, making it available to all users of the system.

The set of environments used for a DTAP cycle is often called a DTAP street.

The set of environments can be smaller or larger, depending on the demands of the project. Examples of other steps are:

1. Education – This extension of the DTAP-street is a training environment for the users of the production environment.
2. Backup – The backup site is used for disaster recovery.

Though the methodology is called DTAP, some projects might use DTAPB, DTP, DTEP or any other variant addressing the project needs.

== See also ==
- Continuous delivery
- Deployment environment
- Release management
- Software testing
