= Heart of Africa =

1985 video game

- Developer: Ozark Softscape
- Publisher: Electronic Arts
- Designer: Danielle Bunten Berry
- Platform: Commodore 64
- Release: NA: 1985; EU: 1985
- Genre: Strategy
- Mode: Single-player

Heart of Africa is a strategy video game for the Commodore 64 similar in style to The Seven Cities of Gold. Created by Ozark Softscape and published by Electronic Arts in 1985, it casts the player as an adventurer searching for the Lost Tomb of Pharaoh Ahnk Ahnk in Africa during the 1890s.

== Gameplay ==
The game begins with the player having disembarked a steamer north of Cairo in January 1890. The player uses a joystick to move about and choose various game options.

The game is played on a screen with a small map in the center and various icons and information surrounding it. Above the map is the current month and year, to the right is information displaying how much food and money the player has, as well as the number of gifts and what is currently in the player's hands. To the left are four icons that allow the player to interact with the game. By pressing the joystick fire button the player can select one of the icons:

- The diary icon allows the player to page through the diary to review notes that are automatically written throughout the game, as well as notes of interaction with native chiefs.
- The map icon lets the player see how much of the current region has been explored so far. It also provides a map of any city or village the player is currently in - as long as he has bearings there.
- The options icon offers the player three choices. The player can check his location, health, or can drop items to create a cache. A cache is marked on the map with an X and the player can return later to retrieve the items.
- The hand icon lets the player select and use items from his inventory. Items in hand can affect (among other things) how natives act, how well the player can traverse the terrain and whether the player can find buried treasure.

The player obtains items by trading with or buying from the natives. This is accomplished simply by standing next to a native in a hut to learn what he or she will sell or trade. The player then stands over the commodity and buys it. Each city has one merchant who will buy and sell valuable commodities. Native chiefs can tell the player where to find valuables, if they are brought what they want.

At various times throughout the game the player can become delirious. When this happens the joystick controls will respond in a random manner until the delirium has passed. To save a game the player must go into a pub in a port city. Up to ten games can be saved on a formatted disk. The game is won when the player finds the Lost Tomb of Pharaoh Ahnk Ahnk. A splash screen is shown and special music is played. The tomb is in a different (randomly generated) spot for each game.

== Reception ==
Computer Gaming World in 1986 called the game "something which none of the participants will soon forget". It praised the graphics and ability to complete quests not related to the main story. In 1990 and surveys of pre-20th century strategy games the magazine gave the game two-plus stars out of five, calling it an "arcade-like", unhistorical and less successful sequel. Compute! noted that Heart of Africa only had one map, unlike its predecessor, but concluded that it "should excite anyone who found Seven Cities of Gold even remotely interesting". Ahoy! criticized the game for being too easy, as the tomb could be found by accident.
