= Dribbleware =

Dribbleware is software for which updates are released often. The term generally has a negative connotation – referring to software that was originally released with numerous bugs and without important features. Frequent releases might be due to factors such as poor software development practices and an aggressive market release date.
