= Command HQ =

1990 video game

- Developer: Ozark Softscape
- Publisher: Microplay Software
- Designer: Danielle Bunten
- Platforms: MS-DOS; Classic Mac OS
- Release: 1990
- Genre: Real-time strategy
- Mode: Single-player

Command HQ is a real-time strategy world domination game. It was released in 1990 by Microplay Software and was created by designer Danielle Bunten.

Tommo purchased the rights to this game in 2013 and digitally publishes it through its Retroism brand in 2015.

== Overview ==
While Command HQ was recognized as one of the earliest real-time strategy games for the PC, it was preceded by the Ancient Art of War and other trailblazers. Unlike these games it has elements of unit production and resource use that would later be expanded in games like Dune II and Command and Conquer. Its user interface was also ahead of its time in its use of the mouse to plot movement and the clear presentation of game data. Another innovation was for two players to play against each other head-to-head remotely via serial (RS-232) cable, dial up modem or a null modem. No option exists for broadband Internet users; making it mandatory to tie up the phone lines. A plugin for IPX/SPX exists.

Players simulate a variety of global wars through time - 1918 (World War I), 1942 (World War II), 1986 (World War III), 2023 (alternative history) and a post-apocalyptic future in which each player starts from a random position with no knowledge of their opponent's starting position and must explore and expand to confront them.

The game is played on a fully revealed map of the world (except in the post-apocalyptic future setting, when the world is concealed by fog of war) with various terrain types. The number of cities determines one's income and therefore what can be built. In some scenarios the number of oil wells controlled affects the movement of a player's units. There are relatively few unit types and their availability differs according to the scenario. Units' movements and orders are plotted in advance. It has a number of facilities for zooming in to see action more clearly. Enemy units are only visible when they are in range of friendly units. This provides ample opportunity for surprise attacks on the unwary. The game is won when all the capital cities of the world have been captured by one side.

The game is playable over the internet using DOS Box. The player can also install the latest version of the game from Safeharborgames, and play online there without charge or copy protection issues.

== Reception ==
Command HQ sold 75,000 copies by June 1993.

The game was reviewed in 1991 in Dragon #169 by Hartley, Patricia, and Kirk Lesser in "The Role of Computers" column. The reviewers gave the game an "X" for "Not recommended". A Computer Gaming World survey that year of strategy and war games, however, gave it four and a half stars out of five, and the magazine named the game, with Warlords, as its 1991 Wargames of the Year. 1993 and 1994 surveys in the magazine of wargames gave the game three-plus stars out of five.

== Reviews ==
- Joker Verlag präsentiert: Sonderheft (1993)
- ASM (Aktueller Software Markt) (May, 1991)

== Legacy ==
Computer Gaming World in July 1994 reported a rumor that MicroProse was working on Command HQ II, with four-way and possibly network multiplayer support.
