= Poshlib =

Software framework used in cross-platform software development

Posh is a software framework used in cross-platform software development. It was created by Brian Hook. It is BSD licensed and as of 17 March 2014, at version 1.3.002.

The Posh software framework provides a header file and an optional C source file.

Posh does not provide alternatives where a host platform does not offer a feature, but informs through preprocessor macros what is supported and what is not. It sets macros to assist in compiling with various compilers (such as GCC, MSVC and OpenWatcom), and different host endiannesses. In its simplest form, only a single header file is required. In the optional C source file, there are functions for byte swapping and in-memory serialisation/deserialisation.

Brian Hook also created SAL (Simple Audio Library) that utilises Posh. Both are featured in his book "Write Portable Code". Posh is also used in Ferret and Vega Strike.

== See also ==
- Simple DirectMedia Layer (SDL)
