= Push on green =

Automatic software update process

Push On Green is a process for automatically updating production software systems in a safe and controlled manner. Push on green processes are intended to keep production systems up and running with minimal manual effort and minimal user-visible downtime.
