= Patricia Goodson =

American pianist

- Origin: United States
- Occupation: Pianist

Patricia Goodson is an American pianist residing in the Czech Republic.

Goodson's recording of contemporary piano music, Strange Attractors, features works by John Harbison, Martin Herman, Stephen Jaffe, Robert Kyr, Augusta Read Thomas and Randall Woolf. She has also recorded a 4-disc set of the complete solo piano music of Czech composer Josef Bohuslav Foerster, titled Foerster: Dreams, Memories and Impressions. Other recordings include works by Scottish-Czech composer Geraldine Mucha, her Concerto for Piano (1960) and Variations on an Old Scottish Song (1954), both on an ArcoDiva label release, and solo works by Mucha on a 2021 Brilliant Classics release. Goodson's pianism also appears on a Rattle Records label release titled Shadows Crossing Water, featuring works by New Zealand composer Dame Gillian Whitehead. In addition, Goodson has recorded numerous works for Czech Radio including pieces by Vlastislav Matoušek, Hanuš Bartoň, Josef Adamek and others.

Goodson has hosted numerous programs on Czech music for Radio Prague to include a series titled Encore, and many of these programs have been archived at the Radio Prague website. She has also written articles for The Prague Post.

Early in her career, Goodson was employed by General Computer Company in Cambridge, Massachusetts to create or transcribe music and sound effects for video games, chiefly for Atari home cartridges. She composed music for Bally Midway's "Jr Pac-Man" and "Foodfight", and handled audio work for approximately 35 game cartridges.

Goodson graduated from Duke University with a degree in music, and from the Peabody Conservatory with a Master of Music in piano performance. She is on the piano faculty of New York University in Prague, and until 2017 served as co-founder and co-director of the Geraldine Mucha musical archive.

== Personal life ==
Goodson lives in Prague with her husband, Ivan Karhan.
