= Cartels & Cutthroats =

1981 simulation video game

- Developer: Strategic Simulations
- Publisher: Strategic Simulations
- Designers: Danielle Bunten Berry; Bill Bunten
- Platforms: Apple II, MS-DOS, Commodore 64
- Release: 1981: Apple II; 1985: MS-DOS; 1986: C64
- Genre: Business simulation
- Modes: Single-player, multiplayer

Cartels & Cutthroats (stylized on the box cover, but not the title screen, as ¢artels & Cutthroat$) is a 1981 business simulation game published by Strategic Simulations for the Apple II. Ports to MS-DOS (1985) and Commodore 64 (1986) followed.

== Gameplay ==
Cartels & Cutthroats is a game in which the players own companies as part of an economic simulation.

== Reception ==
Robin D. Roberts reviewed the game for Computer Gaming World, and stated that "While an excellent program, the casual gamer may find his interest wane after a short time. This game is best suited for those who are interested in marketing simulations and are willing to expend the time needed to play them well."

Bob Proctor reviewed the game for Computer Gaming World, and stated that "what is happening and includes strategy tips. There is enough information here to qualify this game as an introductory course for Micro-economics; in fact, at a recent seminar, Cartels & Cutthroats was shown as an example of Computer-Assisted Instruction. Don't let that fool you; it's a great game!"
