= Backporting =

Developing an update for older software based on an update to a newer version

Backporting is the process of porting a software update that was developed for a relatively current version of a software entity to an older version of the software. It is a maintenance activity of the software development process. Although a backported update can modify any aspect of the software, the technique is typically used for relatively small scope changes – such as fixing a software bug or security vulnerability.

For example, v2 of an application had a vulnerability that was addressed by creating and publishing an update. The same vulnerability exists in v1 and the version is still in use. The modification that was originally applied to v2 is backported to v1 and adapted to apply to v1.

One aspect that affects the effort to backport a change is the degree to which the software has changed between versions (for aspects other than the backported change). Backporting can be relatively simple if only a few lines of code have changed, but complex for heavily modified code. As such, cost–benefit analysis may be performed to determine whether a change should be backported.

== Procedures ==
Backporting generally starts one of two ways. Sometimes, as a change is being developed for the latest code, the issue is known to apply to older versions and therefore, backporting is known to have value. If it's determined to be worthwhile, the change is backported. But, sometimes older versions are not considered when fixing an issue. Sometimes the backporting process starts when an issue is discovered or reported in an older version and then it's determined that the issue was fixed in a new version, making backporting an economical option as opposed to re-inventing a fix. After the existing change is backported, the development process is like for any change. The changed code is quality controlled to verify that it exhibits fixed behavior and maintains previous functionality. Then, it is distributed. Multiple modifications are commonly bundled into a single software update.

As for any update, for closed-source software, backport updates are produced and distributed by the owner of the software, but for open-source software, anyone can produce and distribute a backported update.

A notable process is for the Linux kernel codebase. Backports are sometimes created by Linux distributors and later upstreamed to the core codebase by submitting changes to the maintainer of the changed component.

== Examples ==
Many features of Windows Vista were backported to Windows XP when Service Pack 3 was released, thereby facilitating compatibility of applications (mostly games) originally with Vista as a minimum requirement to run on XP SP3 as a minimum requirement instead. Unofficial backports of .NET Framework versions 2.0 and 3.5 to Windows 95 have also been created.

The Debian Project since September 2010 has provided an official backporting service for some Debian Linux software packages, and Ubuntu Linux also supports backports.

== See also ==
- Backward compatibility – Technological ability to interact with older technologies
- Retrofitting – Addition of new technology or features to older systems
