= Danielle Bunten Berry =

American game designer and programmer

- Born: Daniel Paul Bunten; February 19, 1949; St. Louis, Missouri, U.S.
- Died: July 3, 1998 (aged 49); Little Rock, Arkansas, U.S.
- Occupations: Game designer, programmer
- Known for: M.U.L.E. The Seven Cities of Gold
- Awards: AIAS Hall of Fame Award (2007)

Danielle Bunten Berry (born Daniel Paul Bunten, February 19, 1949 – July 3, 1998), was an American game designer and programmer, known for the 1983 game M.U.L.E., one of the first influential multiplayer video games, and 1984's The Seven Cities of Gold.

In 1998, she was awarded the Lifetime Achievement Award by the Computer Game Developers Association. In 2007, the Academy of Interactive Arts & Sciences chose Berry as the 10th inductee into its Hall of Fame. In 2009, she was chosen by IGN as one of the top 100 game creators of all time.

== Early life ==
Berry was born Daniel Paul Bunten in St. Louis, Missouri and moved to Little Rock, Arkansas as a junior in high school. She was the oldest of six siblings. While growing up in Little Rock, Berry's family did not always have enough money to make ends meet, so Berry took a job at a pharmacy. She also held a leadership role with the Boy Scouts.

According to Berry, one of her fondest childhood memories involved playing games with her family. She was quoted as saying, "When I was a kid, the only times my family spent together that weren't totally dysfunctional were when we were playing games. Consequently, I believe games are a wonderful way to socialize."

While attending the University of Arkansas, she opened up her own bike shop called Highroller Cyclerie. Berry acquired a degree in industrial engineering in 1974 and started programming text-based video games as a hobby. After she graduated from college, she was employed by the National Science Foundation, where she created urban models before starting a job at a video game company.

== Career ==
In 1978, Berry sold a real-time auction game for the Apple II titled Wheeler Dealers to a Canadian software company, Speakeasy Software. This early multiplayer game required a custom controller, raising its price to USD$35 in an era of $15 games sold in plastic bags. It sold only 50 copies. After creating a football game to play with friends at work, Berry submitted it to Strategic Simulations, which the company ended up publishing in 1981 as Computer Quarterback.

After producing three titles for Strategic Simulations, Berry, who by then had founded a software company called Ozark Softscape, caught the attention of Electronic Arts founder Trip Hawkins. M.U.L.E. was Berry's first game for EA, originally published for the Atari 8-bit computers because the Atari 800 had four controller ports. Berry later ported it to the Commodore 64. While its sales of 30,000 units were not high, the game developed a cult following and was widely pirated. The game setting was inspired by the novel Time Enough for Love by Robert A. Heinlein.

Along with the success of M.U.L.E., Berry also had close ties with the games Robot Rascals, Heart of Africa, and Cartels & Cutthroat$. Throughout her career, she was involved in the creation of 12 games, 10 of which revolved around multiplayer compatibility. The only two which did not have a multiplayer focus were The Seven Cities of Gold and Heart of Africa.

Berry wanted to follow up M.U.L.E. with a game that would have been similar to the later game Sid Meier's Civilization, but after fellow Ozark Softscape partners balked at the idea, Berry followed with The Seven Cities of Gold, which proved popular because of its simplicity. By the time the continent data were stored in the computer's memory, there was little left for fancy graphics or complex gameplay - the game had only five resources. It was a hit, selling more than 150,000 copies.

The follow-up game, Heart of Africa, appeared in 1985 and was followed by Robot Rascals, a combination computer/card game that had no single-player mode and sold only 9,000 copies, and 1988's Modem Wars, one of the early games played by two players over a dial-up modem. Modem Wars was ahead of its time, as few people in the late 1980s had modems in their homes.

Berry departed EA for MicroProse. Allegedly, Trip Hawkins, CEO of EA, did not feel that pushing production of games onto a cartridge based system was a good idea. The shift was important to Berry, as computer games had previously been distributed on floppy discs, and a changeover to a cartridge system would allow games to be played on Nintendo systems. This was a significant factor in her decision to leave. Around the same time, a port of M.U.L.E. to the Mega Drive/Genesis was cancelled after Berry refused to put guns and bombs in the game, feeling it would alter the game too much from its original concept. She then developed a computer version of the board game Axis and Allies, which became 1990's Command HQ, a modem/network grand strategy wargame. Berry's second and last game for MicroProse was 1992's Global Conquest, a 4-player network/modem war game. It was the first 4-player network game from a major publisher. Berry was a strong advocate of multi-player online games, observing that, "No one ever said on their deathbed, 'Gee, I wish I had spent more time alone with my computer.'" Berry was one of the co-founders of the internet-oriented entity Mpath. Berry's Warsport, a remake of Modem Wars, debuted on Mpath's MPlayer.com service in 1997.

Less than a year after the release of Warsport, Berry was diagnosed with lung cancer, presumably related to years of heavy smoking. She died on July 3, 1998. At the time, she was working on the design of an Internet version of M.U.L.E.

== M.U.L.E. ==
The game's primary premise consisted of players playing with and against one another to establish total control over a planet. The name of the game stands for Multiple Use Labor Element. The game was originally made for the Atari 400 and 800, then later ported to the Commodore 64, NES, and IBM PCjr. The game has a maximum of four players. Players are given different options and choices, and are allowed to create their colony the way they see fit. This can be done by changing races and giving respective colonies different advantages that will impact the way the game is played and determined later on down the line.

Ultimately, there are two ways in which players can win the game. The first way is by having the most money out of all four players, and the second way is by being able to survive the colony itself. The game focuses heavily on going out and retrieving resources that can be used to benefit their character. Items such as food, energy, and crystite are some of a number of in-game items that players can retrieve and use to better themselves. For a player to be able to access these items, they will first have to have access to a M.U.L.E. The acquisition of these items has a direct reflection on what the player will be allowed to do. For example, if a player does not have enough food, they will have less time during their turn.

== The Seven Cities of Gold ==
The Seven Cities of Gold was originally intended to be another multiplayer game. It was originally a single player format, focused heavily on having the players travel around the map and collect items to help them strengthen their colony. Once they felt as though they had a solid colony, the players could battle each other to see who could overtake whom. After much consideration, Ozark Software concluded that this would not be doable. Instead, they went with a formula that had the game focus solely on developing a colony.

== Ozark Softscape ==
Ozark Softscape was a computer game development team consisting initially of Berry, her brother Bill Bunten, Jim Rushing, and Alan Watson. Ozark was run out of Berry's basement. The company was based out of Little Rock, Arkansas and had profound success with a few of their early titles. Ozark Softscape had a publishing deal with Electronic Arts for several of its groundbreaking games. In the early 1990s, Ozark Softscape left its partnership with Electronic Arts over a dispute to port some games to cartridge format for the Nintendo Entertainment System. It began a partnership with MicroProse to produce two more titles: Command HQ and Global Conquest. A dispute occurred over creating a follow-up to M.U.L.E. with Sega in 1993, and the company dissolved. The employees of Ozark Softscape moved to different areas of the software industry.

== Personal life ==
Berry was married three times. Berry had three children, one daughter and two sons.

After a third divorce, Berry, who had until then been living as a man, transitioned to living as a woman. Berry underwent sex reassignment surgery in November 1992 and afterward kept a lower profile in the games industry. Berry later regretted having surgery, finding that for her, the drawbacks of surgical transition outweighed the benefits, and wishing she had considered alternative approaches. It caused difficulties in family relationships and led to her being shunned by the video game industry. She joked that the surgery was to improve the industry's male/female ratio and aesthetics, but advised others considering a sex change not to proceed unless there was no alternative and warned them of the cost, saying "Being my 'real self' could have included having a penis and including more femininity in whatever forms made sense. I didn't know that until too late and now I have to make the best of the life I've stumbled into. I just wish I would have tried more options before I jumped off the precipice."

After her transition in fall 1992, Berry stayed out of the video game spotlight, mostly keeping to herself. She felt as though after transitioning, she was not as good at video game development as she had previously been, stating, "So, I'm a little more than three years into my new life role as Ms. Danielle Berry, and her career looks to be somewhat different from old Mr. Dan Bunten's. For one thing, I'm not as good a programmer as he was."

On July 3, 1998, Berry died of lung cancer.

== Games ==
Year	Title	Publisher
1978	Wheeler Dealers	Speakeasy Software
1981	Computer Quarterback	Strategic Simulations
1981	Cartels & Cutthroats	Strategic Simulations
1982	Cytron Masters	Strategic Simulations
1983	M.U.L.E.	NA: Electronic Arts; EU: Ariolasoft; JP: Bullet-Proof Software
1984	The Seven Cities of Gold	NA: Electronic Arts; EU: Ariolasoft
1985	Heart of Africa	Electronic Arts
1986	Robot Rascals	Electronic Arts
1988	Modem Wars	Electronic Arts
1990	Command HQ	Microplay Software
1992	Global Conquest	Microplay Software
1997	Warsport	Mpath Interactive

== Recognition ==
Although many of Berry's titles were not commercially successful, they were widely recognized by the industry as being ahead of their time. On May 7, 1998, less than two months before her death, Berry was awarded the Lifetime Achievement Award by the Computer Game Developers Association.

In 2000, Will Wright dedicated his blockbuster hit The Sims to Berry's memory. In 2007, the Academy of Interactive Arts & Sciences chose Berry to be inducted into its Hall of Fame. Sid Meier, the mastermind behind the video game series Civilization, inducted her at the Hard Rock Hotel in Las Vegas.

Berry was known as someone who was very easy to talk to. If someone recognized her in public, she would be more than delighted to have a conversation with them.

In 2012, Arkansas Times wrote that Berry "is still considered something of a rock star among game designers and those interested in the history of games", crediting her emphasis on social interaction in gaming.

== See also ==
- Dona Bailey
- Jamie Fenton
- Lucy Gilbert
- Patricia Goodson
- Rebecca Heineman
- Amy Hennig
- Brenda Laurel
- Suki Lee
- Cathryn Mataga
- Carla Meninsky
- Laura Nikolich
- Carol Shaw
- Joyce Weisbecker
- Anne Westfall
- List of programmers
- List of women in the video game industry
- Women and video games
- Women in computing
