= Warhammer 40,000: Rites of War =

1999 video game

- Cover art
- Developer: DreamForge
- Publisher: Strategic Simulations
- Series: Warhammer 40,000
- Platform: Windows
- Release: NA: July 27, 1999; UK: September 24, 1999
- Genre: Turn-based strategy
- Modes: Single-player, multiplayer

Warhammer 40,000: Rites of War is a turn-based strategy game based on the Panzer General 2 engine by SSI. It is set in the fictional Warhammer 40,000 universe. It was produced by Games Workshop in 1999, and concerns the invasion of a Tyranid Hive fleet and the Eldar and Imperial efforts to defeat it. The game was re-released in 2015 on GOG.com.

== Gameplay ==
The game has three modes. In the "campaign mode" the player controls the Eldar forces and follows the efforts of the Craftworld Iyanden to conquer a Maiden World, a lost colony of the ancient Eldar race. During the campaign an additional and far more dangerous foe, the alien Tyranids, emerge and the Eldar and Imperial forces unite to defeat them. In "skirmish" mode the player can play as the Imperium, Eldar or Tyranids. The Imperial forces include the Imperial Guard, the Red Hunter chapter of Space Marines, and Sisters of Battle. In multiplayer mode the player can battle other players online.

== Reception ==
Reception

Aggregate score
Aggregator	Score
GameRankings	65%

Review scores
Publication	Score
CNET Gamecenter	8/10
Computer Games Strategy Plus	2.5/5
Computer Gaming World	4/5
EP Daily	7.5/10
Eurogamer	8/10
GamePro	2.5/5
GameRevolution	B
GameSpot	5.9/10
IGN	6.1/10
Next Generation	3/5
PC Accelerator	8/10
PC Gamer (UK)	65%
PC Gamer (US)	75%

The game received mixed reviews according to the review aggregation website GameRankings. PC Gamer US's William R. Trotter praised the game's art and interface, and called the game "an agreeable marriage of the Warhammer license and SSI's tried-and-true concepts." However, he greatly criticized its high difficulty, which he found "obnoxious". In PC Gamer UK, Jason Weston was more negative, writing that the game "plunges straight into this abyss" thanks to its dated engine and bad artificial intelligence. He concluded, "Time to buy an 8x4ft table and paint it green. Could offer much more tactical depth." Conversely, Jeff Lackey of Computer Gaming World called the game "thoroughly engrossing".

William Abner of Computer Games Strategy Plus wrote that the game "feels incomplete and unfinished", and found it to be derivative of Fantasy General and Panzer General II, but "as fun as neither." Despite these criticisms, he argued that "the game is fun to play—while it lasts." John Lee of NextGen wrote of the game, "If your PC has the muscle, you may enjoy this one for several days. Especially if you've got a good pair of sunglasses to mute the glare from those uniforms."
