= Kevin Manthei =

American composer

- Occupation: Composer
- Years active: 1988–present
- Website: kevinmantheimusic.com

Kevin Manthei is an American composer for film, television, and video games.

== Biography ==
Manthei grew up in Minnesota. He played the piano in his youth and played the trumpet in high school. He graduated from the University of Minnesota with a Bachelor of Music degree in Theory and Composition. He additionally studied at the University of Southern California under Jerry Goldsmith. He has collaborated with other graduates of the program, Christophe Beck and Marco Beltrami, writing additional music for Beck on the TV series Buffy the Vampire Slayer and other shows, and composing additional music for Beltrami on films including Scream 2, Scream 3, The Faculty, Scary Movie 2 and Resident Evil.

Manthei began his video game scoring career working on titles such as Panzer General II, Vampire: The Masquerade – Redemption, Sacrifice, Wizardry 8, Twisted Metal: Black. His other work on video game titles includes Kung Fu Panda, Marvel Universe Online, Upshift Strikeracer, Xiaolin Showdown, Ultimate Spider-Man, City of Villains, The Sims 2, StarCraft: Ghost, Shrek 2, Silent Hunter II and Shark Tale.

For his work on Invader Zim, Manthei was nominated for a Best Music Score An Animated Television Production Annie Award in 2001. Invader Zim additionally led to Xiaolin Showdown for Warner Bros. Animation, as well as Brandy & Mr. Whiskers for Disney. In scoring with Warner Bros' television series Johnny Test, he provided the punk rock-infused main title and score to the first season. Manthei additionally created music for shows like Cartoon Network's Generator Rex and Adult Swim's Robot Chicken.

Manthei has additionally worked on scores for independent filmmakers such as for The 24th Day. He wrote the music for the feature films Justice League: The New Frontier and Batman: Gotham Knight, for which he was nominated for another Annie Award, Music in a Feature Production, in 2008, and scored the animated series Ultimate Spider-Man.

== Scores ==
=== Film projects ===
- Lapse, NYU Thesis
- Children of the Corn III: Urban Harvest (1995), Paramount Studios; synth programming
- Scream (1996), Dimension Films; sequence orchestra
- Crossworlds (1996), Trimark Pictures; additional music
- Air Force One (1997), Sony Pictures; sequencing
- Scream 2 (1997), Dimension Films; additional music
- Milo (1998), Sterling Home Entertainment
- Halloween H20: 20 Years Later (1998), Dimension Films; sequencing
- Deep Impact (1998), DreamWorks SKG; additional music
- The Faculty (1998), Dimension Films; additional music
- The Yards (2000), Miramax; trailer
- Dracula 2000 (2000), Dimension Films; additional music
- Scream 3 (2000), Dimension Films; additional music
- Spy Kids (2001), Miramax; trailer
- Scary Movie 2 (2001), Dimension Films; additional music
- Imposter (2001), Dimension Films; trailer
- Gangs of New York (2002), Miramax; trailer
- They (2002), Dimension Films; trailer
- Below (2002), Dimension Films; trailer
- Resident Evil (2002), Sony Pictures; additional music
- Terminator 3: Rise of the Machines (2003), Warner Brothers; trailer
- The 24th Day (2004), Screen Media Films
- Cursed (2005), Dimension Films; trailer
- Batman: Gotham Knight (2008), Warner Brothers Pictures
- Justice League: The New Frontier (2008), Warner Brothers Pictures

=== Television projects ===
- Turning Point (1994–1999), ABC; news magazine
- Pig Sty (1995), United Paramount Network
- Land's End (1995–1996); syndicated detective drama
- Mr. & Mrs Smith (1996), CBS; action spy prime time
- Second Noah (1996–1997), ABC; family drama prime time
- F/X: The Series (1996–1998); syndicated action series
- The Pretender (1996–2000), NBC; action drama series
- Dellaventura (1997–1998), CBS; detective drama series
- Buffy the Vampire Slayer (1997–2003), Warner Brothers; action series
- Tuesdays with Morrie (1999), ABC; prime time movie
- Redemption High (1999), Digital Entertainment Network
- Invader Zim (2001–2002), Nickelodeon; animated series
- Xiaolin Showdown (2003–2006), Warner Brothers; animated series
- Brandy & Mr. Whiskers (2004–2006), Disney; animated series
- Johnny Test (2005–2006), Warner Brothers; animated series, season 1 only
- Robot Chicken (2005–present), Adult Swim; animated series
- The Wizzard of Krudd (2007), Nickelodeon; animated short
- Random! Cartoons (2008–2009), Nickelodeon
- Generator Rex (2010–2013), Cartoon Network
- Ultimate Spider-Man (2012–2017), Disney XD
- Mixels (2014–2016), Cartoon Network
- Transformers: Robots in Disguise (2015–2017), Cartoon Network
- Ben 10 (2016–2021), Cartoon Network
- Villainous (2017–2019), Cartoon Network

=== Video game projects ===
- The Indian in the Cupboard (1995), Viacom New Media
- Civilization II: Fantastic Worlds (1996), MicroProse
- Panzer General II (1997), Strategic Simulations (SSI)
- People's General (1998), Strategic Simulations (SSI)
- King's Quest: Mask of Eternity (1998), Sierra On-Line
- Nancy Drew (1998–2011), HeR Interactive; series – 25 titles
- Jagged Alliance 2 (1999), Sir-Tech Software / TalonSoft
- Panzer General 3D Assault (1999), SSI / Mattel Interactive
- Army Men: Sarge's Heroes (1999), Studio 3DO
- The Next Tetris (1999), Blue Planet Software; DLX Japanese release
- Deer Hunt Challenge (1999), Electronic Arts]
- Ultimate Hunt Challenge (2000), Electronic Arts
- Championship Bass (2000), Electronic Arts
- Sacrifice (2000), Shiny Entertainment / Interplay
- Panzer General III: Scorched Earth (2000), SSI / Mattel Interactive
- Vampire: The Masquerade – Redemption (2000), Nihilistic Software / Activision
- Majesty: The Fantasy Kingdom Sim (2000), Cyberlore Studios / Hasbro Interactive
- Battle Realms (2001), Liquid Entertainment
- Twisted Metal: Black (2001), Sony
- Silent Hunter II (2001), Ultimation / SSI / Mattel Interactive
- Wizardry 8 (2001), Sir-Tech Canada
- Dead to Rights (2002), Namco
- New Legends (2002), Infinite Machine / THQ
- Destroyer Command (2002), Ultimation / SSI / Mattel Interactive
- StarCraft: Ghost (announced 2002 – confirmed cancelled 2014), Nihilistic Software / Blizzard
- Kill Switch (2003), Namco
- The Sims 2 (2004), Electronic Arts / Amaze; PSP
- Shark Tale (2004), Activision / DreamWorks
- Shrek 2 (2004), Activision / DreamWorks
- Pitfall: The Lost Expedition (2004), Activision / Edge of Reality
- Shrek SuperSlam (2005), Activision / Shaba
- Ultimate Spider-Man (2005), Activision / Treyarch
- City of Villains (2005), NCSoft / Cryptic Studios
- Over the Hedge: Hammy Goes Nuts! (2006), DreamWorks / Amaze
- Xiaolin Showdown (2006), Konami / BottleRocket Entertainment
- Upshift Strikeracer (2007), Gala-Net
- Kung Fu Panda (2008), DreamWorks / Activision
- Shrek's Carnival Craze (2008), DreamWorks / Activision
- Champions Online (2009), Cryptic Studios / Atari
- Star Trek Online (2010), Cryptic Studios / Atari
- Marvel Universe Online (2013), Cryptic Studios / Microsoft
