= People's General =

1998 video game

- Developer: Strategic Simulations, Inc.
- Publishers: NA: Strategic Simulations, Inc.; EU: Mindscape
- Designer: SSI Special Products Group
- Programmer: Paul Murray
- Artist: David Jensen
- Composer: Kevin Manthei
- Platform: Microsoft Windows
- Release: NA: September 14, 1998; EU: September 15, 1998
- Genre: Computer wargame
- Modes: Single-player, multiplayer

People's General (a.k.a. Dynasty General) is a turn-based computer wargame developed by Strategic Simulations, Inc (SSI). It was released in September 1998 in North America and Europe. The game focuses on early 21st century warfare in Asia. People's General, or PeG as it is commonly known, followed SSI's successful 5 Star General Series of World War II war games (Panzer General, Allied General, Pacific General) and their sequel, Panzer General II (PG2). It uses the same game dynamics as these earlier games—turn-based movement & fighting with military units on a hex based map. PeG uses substantially the same "Living Battlefield" game engine as PG2 but features higher quality (16 bit) graphics and many new features.

== Gameplay ==
People's General focuses on modern conflict in Asia between 20 countries, principally the United States, China and Russia. The countries are organized into an Eastern Alliance and a Western Alliance. China, Mongolia and North Korea comprise the Eastern Alliance. The USA, Russia, 13 other countries and the United Nations comprise the Western Alliance. Vietnam is included as a non-aligned country.

The original campaigns and scenarios expanded on this premise with a more detailed background story provided by SSI via an introductory video. The video narrated hypothetical "future" events occurring from 2000–2004, i.e., after publication of the game and before the start of the campaigns and scenarios. According to this video, both the US and Russia reduce their military spendings. Russia is in turmoil from food shortages and other internal conflicts. China grows stronger militarily. After invading and annexing Taiwan it initiates a plan to dominate all of Asia from Sakhalin Islands and Vladivostok in the east to Volgograd and Kazakhstan in the west; from Siberia in the north to Southeast Asia and Singapore in the south. China justifies this as "reclaiming traditional Chinese territories". The USA sends its 7th Fleet to the Taiwan Straits to force China to withdraw. Chinese air attacks sink 7th Fleet's flagship USS Abraham Lincoln (CVN-72), claiming it was in Chinese waters. United States denounces this as an unprovoked attack and declares war on China. The US is joined by the United Nations and most of its members.

The game dynamics in PeG are essentially the same as those in PG2 and SSI's earlier Generals games:

1. The playing pieces are military units which have varied attack, defense and other characteristics.
2. Play is turn based with unit purchase, deployment, movement and combat occurring throughout each player's turn.
3. Game play takes place on maps with different types of terrain which affect each unit's attack, defense, movement, supply, spotting results & entrenchment.
4. Units can be damaged or destroyed from combat but can also increase their experience as a result of combat.
5. Prestige points are used to purchase or upgrade units; prestige points are distributed at the beginning of scenarios and during game play.

Nine campaigns were included in the original release of PeG. Most of these are based on the idea that China grows increasingly powerful, runs low on resources and sets out to conquer Asia. The Western Alliance led by the USA hopes to stop China but the conflict becomes World War III covering all of Asia plus Russia.

The original campaigns are:

- Eastern Long Campaign (18 scenarios): The player takes command of the Chinese forces in their invasion of Russia and later South East Asia.
- Western Long Campaign (18 scenarios): The player leads US & allied forces against the Chinese to drive them out of Russia, South East Asia and Korea.
- Railroaded (6 scenarios): The player takes command of the UN forces in Russia along the Trans-Siberian Railway.
- New World Order (4 scenarios): The player takes command of the Vietnamese forces in their invasion of Thailand and the Malay Peninsula.
- Korea Revisited (3 scenarios): The player takes command of the US forces in the battle for the Korean peninsula.
- Four additional campaigns which vary the length and difficulty of the Eastern & Western campaigns.

In addition to the scenarios that are part of the campaigns, PeG was released with 103 stand-alone scenarios. These can be played against the AI, against other human players using a hot-seat, via e-mail, via the Internet or LAN.

The game includes an editor for users to develop their own campaigns and scenarios.

== Reception ==
Reception

Aggregate score
| Aggregator | Score |
|---|---|
| GameRankings | 76% |

Review scores
| Publication | Score |
|---|---|
| AllGame | 3/5 |
| CNET Gamecenter | 8/10 |
| Computer Games Strategy Plus | 3/5 |
| Computer Gaming World | 3/5 |
| GameSpot | 8.8/10 |
| GameStar | 86% |
| Next Generation | 3/5 |
| PC Gamer (US) | 94% |
| PC Zone | 68% |

The game received favorable reviews according to the review aggregation website GameRankings. Next Generation gave a positive review of the game.

The game was named the best wargame of 1998 by CNET Gamecenter, whose staff highlighted its relevant subject matter, its ease of use, and its enjoyable gameplay. PC Gamer US and GameSpot both nominated the game in this category, but it lost the awards to The Operational Art of War Vol. 1: 1939-1955. The staff of PC Gamer praised The People's General's graphics, game's interface, and new aerial sub-routine.
