= Panzer General =

1994 video game

- Developer: Strategic Simulations
- Publisher: Strategic Simulations
- Designer: SSI Special Projects Group
- Programmer: Paul Murray
- Artist: David Jensen
- Composer: Doug Brandon
- Platforms: MS-DOS, 3DO, Mac OS 7, PlayStation, Windows
- Release: 1994
- Genre: Computer wargame
- Modes: Single-player, multiplayer

Panzer General is a 1994 computer wargame developed and published by Strategic Simulations Inc. (SSI). It simulates conflict during World War II. The designers of Panzer General were heavily influenced by the Japanese wargame series Daisenryaku.

Panzer General was a major commercial hit: 250,000 units were sold at full price, and long tail sales continued in the years ahead. It became and remained SSI's best-selling game across all genres, and was named the best-selling computer wargame of all time in 2007. It is the first in the commercially successful Panzer General series.

== Gameplay ==
German bombers attacking allied artillery

Panzer General is a turn-based game, set on operational level hex maps. One plays lone scenarios from either Axis or Allied side and against a computer or human opponent. In Campaign Mode, the player assumes the role of a German Generalissimus against the Allied computer.

Panzer General is an operational-level game, and units approximate battalions, although the unit size and map scale from one scenario to the next are elastic. While the names and information for the units are reasonably accurate, the scenarios only approximate historical situations.

Its novel feature was to link individual scenarios into a campaign spanning World War II from 1939 to 1945. Units are able to gain experience and become stronger, where success in one battle would award the player prestige to upgrade units, acquire additional units, and select a better scenario for the next battle.

The game requires the player to use combined-arms tactics, where each unit is strong against some unit types but very vulnerable to others. Dug-in enemy positions must be softened by artillery, which is vulnerable and needs protection. Before attacking the infantry and anti-tank, one needs first to destroy the enemy artillery that protects them from behind. If no tanks can get within range, one does this mostly by bombers, but then it is advantageous to destroy the air defense units first. The fighter planes must negotiate dual roles: destroying the enemy air force and protecting their own bombers.

The player must carefully observe the road system to speed the advance, or may use Bridge engineers to cross the rivers. The game rewards a Blitzkrieg strategy - penetrating deep into the enemy positions while postponing the destruction of some of the encountered enemy units for later.

The performance of units is increased by their experience points, which are acquired through combat. In Campaign mode particularly, one then has to protect the experienced units as the most valuable assets.

=== Campaigns ===
Panzer General has 38 scenarios based on real or fictitious battles from World War II. The player can engage in a single battle or a campaign mode.

In Campaign Mode, a series of battles unfold as a campaign heads to victory. There is one long campaign as Germany, with five starting locales:

- Poland (1939); from Poland, through Norway, to the West with possible amphibious invasion in Britain.
- North Africa (1941); from North Africa to the Middle East.
- Barbarossa (1941); from the initial invasion of the Soviet border to Moscow.
- Italy (1943); from the Allied landing on Sicily to the end of the war.
- Kharkov (1943); from the German spring offensive to the end of the war.

The task in most scenarios is to take all objective cities in a given number of turns; taking them at least five turns earlier is considered a major victory. In scenarios from later stages of war, the Germans try to hold positions against a stronger enemy. A typical task is then "hold at least two of our objective cities for 20 turns; for a major victory, hold at least five".

All campaigns branch out and end either by the general being sacked for incompetence or end of the war. In Campaign Mode, a major victory could possibly change known historical events. For example, after a major victory over France, the player invades Britain. Later in the game, after a major victory in Barbarossa, the player can convince the German High Command to attack Moscow immediately (which costs him or her much prestige) rather than diverting to Kiev before Moscow.

If the player achieves a major victory both in Britain and in Moscow, he or she is allowed to carry out an invasion of the United States and reach Washington. In any other case, he/she must fight well in many battles to get another chance to attack them. If either Britain or USSR survive this attack, they drive the Germans all the way back to Berlin. The best the player can do is to fight well in each battle to have enough prestige for the next one - and to achieve a major victory in the final defense of Berlin.

== Development ==
The design of Panzer General was based on the Japanese wargame Daisenryaku. The Strategic Simulations (SSI) team had played a Japanese-language version of the game's Sega Genesis release extensively, and were inspired by its streamlined design. Scenario designer Chuck Kroegel later described Panzer General's structure as "diametrically opposed to the Gary Grigsby type of game that SSI was used to making". He noted that SSI founder Joel Billings was initially hesitant to adopt the design style. The company's Graeme Bayless later wrote of Daisenryaku: "The genius in this game was the fact that it took the highly complex subject (WWII conflict on land) and boiled it down to the pertinent parts".

Daisenryaku would go on to serve as the inspiration for the entire Panzer General series.

== Reception ==
=== Sales ===
Panzer General was a commercial success. By November 1995, it had sold over 100,000 copies in the United States and 50,000 in Europe. According to William R. Trotter of PC Gamer US, it was particularly popular in Germany. By August 1996, sales had surpassed 250,000 copies. Describing the situation at the time, Computer Gaming World columnist Terry Coleman wrote: "When you consider that a new Windows 95 and Macintosh version has just been released, it seems fair to say that PG will be incontestably the best-selling historical wargame of all time". The following year, T. Liam McDonald of GameSpot reiterated that the game had sold over 250,000 copies, and noted that 60,000 of these sales came from its PlayStation release. In 2007, Retro Gamer dubbed Panzer General "greatest-selling true wargame of all time", and SSI's most successful title across all genres. The magazine noted that it had accrued 250,000 full-price units sold "and many more in the following years".

=== Computer versions ===
Reception

Review scores
Publication	Score
AllGame	4/5
Computer Gaming World	5/5
PC Gamer (US)	93%

Panzer General won Computer Gaming World's 1994 "Wargame of the Year" and PC Gamer US's "Best Wargame" awards, and was a runner-up for the former magazine's overall "Game of the Year" award, which went to X-COM: UFO Defense. The editors of Computer Gaming World called Panzer General "the first wargame since 1987 to garner the #1 spot on the CGW Top 100 poll—a fine endorsement for the most exciting wargame in a long time".

In 1996, Next Generation listed it as number 51 on their "Top 100 Games of All Time", contending that though the game's interface is simple, the complexity of the strategy is exceptional. In 1996, Computer Gaming World declared Panzer General the 15th-best computer game ever released, and listed the Game Over scene as #8 on its list of "the 15 best ways to die in computer gaming". The magazine's wargame columnist Terry Coleman named it his pick for the best computer wargame released by late 1996.

In 1996, Panzer General won the Origins Award for Best Military or Strategy Computer Game of 1995.

=== Console ports ===
Reception

Review scores
Publication	Score
AllGame	2.5/5 (PS1)
Electronic Gaming Monthly	7.125 / 10 (3DO)
Next Generation	4/5 (3DO); 3/5 (PS1)

Reviews for the 3DO version were generally positive. The four reviewers of Electronic Gaming Monthly remarked that the game's high level of complexity makes it difficult to get into and unappealing to anyone but enthusiasts of the genre, but that the gameplay design is solid and there is a strong dose of variety to the campaigns. A critic for Next Generation argued that while the music and battle animations quickly wear thin, the game allows them to be turned off and "what it lacks in style, it makes up in substance". He made particular note of the impressive depth of the strategy and the ability to control nearly every land and aircraft used in the World War II European theater. Sir Garnabus of GamePro complimented the accuracy of the 3DO port but otherwise panned the game, contending that war strategy games in general are poor due to their minimalist graphics and focus on thinking rather than acting.

In their brief review of the PlayStation version, Next Generation remarked: "One of the best PC wargames of all time and still highly thought of, this version doesn't miss a trick".

== Legacy ==
5-Star General series
1994	Panzer General
1995	Allied General
1996	Fantasy General
1996	Star General
1997	Pacific General
1997	Panzer General II
1998	People's General
1999	Panzer General 3D Assault
2000	Panzer General III: Scorched Earth
2001–2008
2009	Panzer General: Allied Assault
2010–2012
2013	Panzer General Online
2014–2018
2019	Fantasy General II: Invasion

In 1996, Robert Mayer of Computer Games Strategy Plus argued:

In the years to come, computer wargamers may divide the world into two epochs, Before Panzer General, and After. Before Panzer General, wargames were supposed to be complex, intimidating things, accessible only by the anointed few, the grognards, veterans of decades of board gaming and masters of military arcana. SSI's Panzer General, however, shattered that view, with excellent graphics and animation, and sheer fun that drew in grizzled campaigners as well as green novices. Not surprisingly, there seems to be a rush now towards kindlier, gentler wargames.

Bruce Geryk of GameSpot argued that Panzer General resurrected the computer wargaming genre.

=== Direct sequels ===
Panzer General was the first game in the Panzer General series, which grew in the years after its release. It was followed by Allied General (Panzer General II in Germany), which allows play from the Allied point of view and features four new campaigns. Other sequels include Fantasy General, Pacific General and Star General. Its mainline sequel, Panzer General II (titled Panzer General 3D in Germany), upgraded the interface to use an overlay of photorealistic terrain, and to display different unit facings, resulting in an improved appearance. In the April 2000 issue of PC Gamer, it was voted the 44th best computer game of all time.

The series continued with People's General, an upgraded version of Panzer General II based on a World War III scenario between China and the UN. Panzer General also provided a Play by Email (PBEM) system. Panzer General 3D Assault arrived in 1999, with fully 3D graphics. Panzer General III: Scorched Earth was released in 2000, with better graphics and a redesigned interface.

== See also ==
- Panzer Tactics DS
- Panzer Corps (video game)
