= Bismarck (board game) =

Board game, variant of "Battleship"

Box cover of original 1962 edition

Bismarck is a board wargame published by Avalon Hill in 1962 (and revised in 1978) that simulates the hunt for the Bismarck.

== Description ==
Bismarck is a two-player board wargame in which one player controls the German battleship Bismarck (and in the 1978 edition, the heavy cruiser Prinz Eugen), and the other player the British forces hunting for it.

== Gameplay (1962 edition) ==
The game box contains a search board and a battle board, both utilizing a square grid, along with zone cards, die-cut counters representing a large number of British units, and one single German counter, the Bismarck.

The game uses a double-blind system, where the British search areas and zones of the map for the Bismarck. If the British player discovers the location of the Bismarck, combat takes place on the battle board. The Bismarck has a chance to evade combat, restarting the search. Points are gained by both players for destroying ships, and for the German player, for docking in friendly ports.

Box cover of second edition, 1978

== Gameplay (1978 edition) ==
The 1978 edition has some similarities to the game Battleship, with both players having a hidden map-board and calling out coordinates to locate their opponent. The British player sets up a large number of Royal Navy vessels and search aircraft on their map-board before game play begins, while the German player places the Bismarck and the Prince Eugen on their mapboard.

Each turn, the players move their respective units, searching for enemy units, and possibly engaging in combat. Each player calls out grid coordinates containing a ship or aircraft, and the opponent indicates whether a ship is located there, and if so what type. A player may choose not to search with a particular unit, thus keeping its location secret. As the British are unlikely to have a force sufficient to sink the Bismarck when they initially find her, they will need to "shadow" the vessel. For example, a fast unit such as the heavy cruiser HMS Suffolk, is able to keep up with Bismarck and follow her on radar without engaging in combat.

Eventually, British heavy units, such as the battlecruiser HMS Hood may be vectored into the same square as the German Task Force. At this point combat ensues. The British also have air units on the aircraft carriers HMS Victorious and HMS Ark Royal which can both search for the Germans and attack with torpedoes from a distance. The game has combat damage sheets with squares representing areas of each warship that can be damaged in combat. As combat is resolved, squares are checked off.

=== Intermediate and Advanced rules ===
The 1978 edition also included Intermediate Rules provide a set of modular additions, such as a more sophisticated weather system, submarines and destroyers, fighter aircraft, alternate "what if" scenarios (such as the German aircraft carrier Graf Zeppelin, breakout with the Tirpitz, French and U.S. forces, etc.), and more. The Advanced Rules implement ship-to-ship combat using a miniatures-type system, with ship counters laid out on the floor, realistic damage to ships, etc.

=== Scenarios ===
The game offers eight scenarios: one historical scenario, and seven "what if?" scenarios.

=== Victory conditions ===
The Germans win by avoiding contact with the British, successfully "breaking out" into the Atlantic and ravaging merchant shipping there. They can also achieve victory by destroying any opposition they encounter and making their way to a friendly port in Occupied France.

The British win by intercepting and destroying the Bismarck.

== Publication history ==
Bismarck was designed by Thomas Shaw, Charles S. Roberts, Mick Uhl, and Jack Greene, and was published by Avalon Hill in 1962. This edition was discontinued in 1972.

In 1978, Jack Greene revised the rules, making the relatively simple search, movement and combat systems more complex. This second edition, with new cover art and components, was published in 1978.

In 1988, Joel Billings and John Lyon created a computer game titled Computer Bismarck based on the Avalon Hill game. (Thomas Shaw, vice-president of Avalon Hill, turned down Billings when he approached the game company about producing computer games for them.) Computer Bismarck would become the first game produced by Strategic Simulations Inc. (SSI), the new company co-founded by Billings and Lyon.

== Reception ==
Writing about the 1962 edition in Issue 8 of Games & Puzzles, Don Turnbull called the game "an approximate simulation" because it left out the Prinz Eugen. Turnbull considered the game a failure, saying, "It had some, but not much, merit; certainly anyone who thinks Bismarck will simulate naval action any more than roughly would be disappointed."

In The Playboy Winner's Guide to Board Games, John Jackson noted that the 1962 edition was "easy to grasp and is, for a wargame, quite short — an hour or two at most." He noted that "It is even possible for the German player to win, occasionally, if the Bismarck can elude its pursuers for a while and can catch one or two of the British ships alone at night."

In the 1980 book The Complete Book of Wargames, game designer Jon Freeman called the original 1962 edition "probably the best — and shortest — introductory wargame on the market at the time." However, Freeman didn't feel that the new (1978) edition was "occupying the same niche. It's still a good game; it's just aimed at a broader audience." He concluded by giving the second edition an Overall Evaluation of "Very Good."

In a retrospective review in Issue 9 of Vieille Garde, Stephane Martin gave a lengthy breakdown of the gameplay in the second (1978) edition, and concluded, "Bismarck still remains today a quality reference in naval simulation games. With a little luck, it is possible to find this second-hand game at a very reasonable price."

In another retrospective review, Joe Scoleri noted in Issue 3 of Simulacrum that "Bismarck was one of the easiest and quickest playing [Avalon Hill] Classics but is obviously limited in terms of realism and simulation value." Scoleri concluded, "Although the original version is perfectly acceptable as an introductory game, naval warfare enthusiasts will want to stick with the second edition."

== Other reviews and commentary ==
- BattlePlan #2 & #8
