= Computer Baseball =

1981 video game

- Amiga cover art
- Developer: Strategic Simulations
- Platforms: Amiga, Apple II, Atari 8-bit, Commodore 64, MS-DOS, Mac
- Release: 1981
- Genres: Sports, simulation

Computer Baseball is a sports simulation game published by Strategic Simulations in 1981. It was released for the Apple II, Atari 8-bit computers, and later for the Commodore 64, Macintosh, IBM PC, and Amiga.

== Gameplay ==
Players can manage a game between teams from 14 different World Series contests, or enter in or load the statistics for other teams. For example, players can manage either the Brooklyn Dodgers or New York Yankees in a rematch of the 1955 World Series. Two players can manage against each other, one player can manage against a computer manager, or the computer can manage both teams.

Game play is limited to managerial decisions: setting lineups, pitching changes, pinch hitters and other substitutions, defensive positioning, and offensive decisions such as when to bunt, steal or hit and run.

== Reception ==
Computer Baseball was given the award for "Best Computer Sports Game" in 1982 at the 3rd annual Arcade Awards. Judges described the game as computerized version of the traditional statistical-replay table sports game, and praised it for its "attractive and easy-to-use form".

Computer Gaming World stated in 1985 that Computer Baseball, despite its age, "remains one of the best on the market". It cited the clear documentation and compiling and printing of individual statistics as strengths, while the weak computer opponent was a weakness. Ahoy! wrote in 1986 that the game "isn't as pretty as MicroLeague Baseball, but it may be better for those who replay entire seasons ... its mathematical model considers more statistical categories than other programs". The magazine noted the large number of supplemental disks available from SSI.

The game sold more than 30,000 copies.
