= Computer Bismarck =

1980 video game

- Cover art designed by Louis Saekow featuring the eponymous battleship
- Developer: Strategic Simulations
- Publisher: Strategic Simulations
- Designers: Joel Billings; John Lyons
- Platforms: Apple II, TRS-80
- Release: February 1980
- Genre: Wargame
- Modes: Single-player, multiplayer

Computer Bismarck is a computer wargame developed and published by Strategic Simulations (SSI) in 1980. The game is based on the last battle of the battleship Bismarck, in which British Armed Forces pursue the German Bismarck in 1941. Computer Bismarck is SSI's first game and features turn-based gameplay on a two-dimensional map of the Atlantic Ocean.

The development staff consisted of two programmers, Joel Billings and John Lyons, who programmed the game in BASIC. Originally developed for the TRS-80, an Apple II version was also created two months into the process. After meeting with other wargame developers, Billings decided to publish the game as well. To help accomplish this, he hired Louis Saekow to create the box art.

The first commercially published computer wargame, Computer Bismarck sold well and contributed to SSI's success. Though it received a mixed reception, the game is credited in part for legitimizing wargames and computer games.

== Synopsis ==
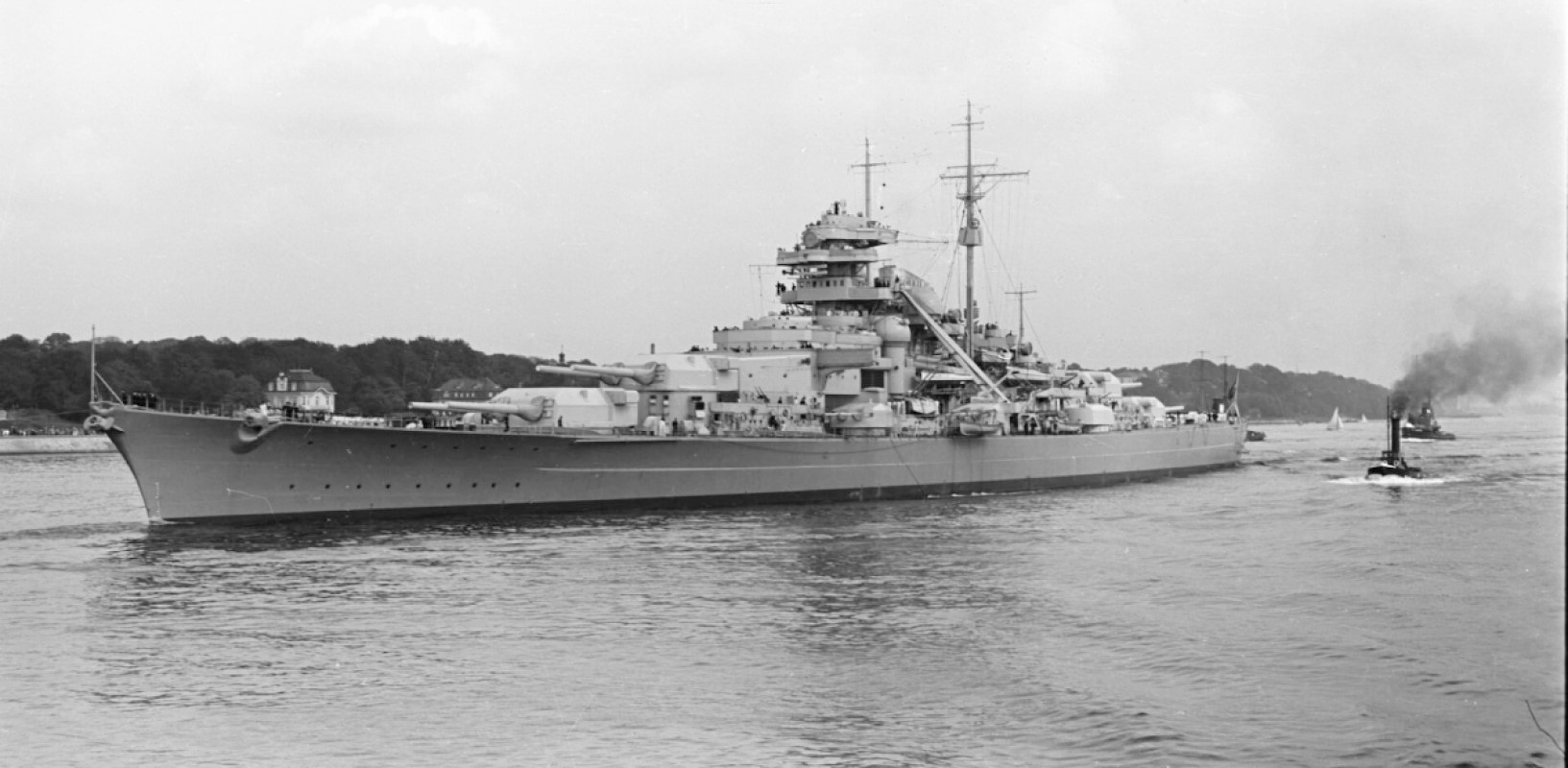
The eponymous German battleship Bismarck in 1940

The game is a simulation of the German battleship Bismarck's last battle in the Atlantic Ocean during World War II. On May 24, 1941, Bismarck and Prinz Eugen sank the British HMS Hood and damaged HMS Prince of Wales at the Battle of the Denmark Strait. Following the battle, British Royal Navy ships and aircraft pursued Bismarck for two days. After being crippled by a torpedo bomber on the evening of May 26, Bismarck was sunk the following morning.

== Gameplay ==
Computer Bismarck takes place in the Atlantic Ocean, with letters representing units and facilities. Players input commands in the prompt below the map.

Computer Bismarck is a turn-based computer wargame in which the player controls British forces against the battleship Bismarck and other German units. The German forces can be controlled by either a computer opponent named "Otto von Computer" or a second player. The game takes place on a map of the North Atlantic Ocean on which letters from the English alphabet represent military units and facilities (airfields and ports). Computer Bismarck includes six scenarios: two for a single player and four competitive scenarios for two players.

Units have different capabilities, as well as statistics that determine their mobility, firepower, vulnerability, and other factors. Turns take the form of phases, and players alternate inputting orders to maneuver their respective units. Phases facilitate different functions, such as informing players of status changes, unit movement, and battles. Battles occur when two opposing units occupy the same location on the map. Combat outcomes are calculated by the game, and players earn points by destroying opposing units. The game ends after the Bismarck is sunk or a number of turns have occurred. Alternatively, the British or German forces are declared the victor if one side accumulates a 30-point lead over the other. Players can suspend the game by saving their progress.

== Development ==
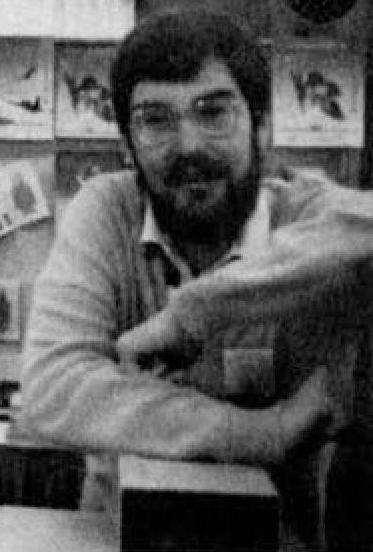
Joel Billings

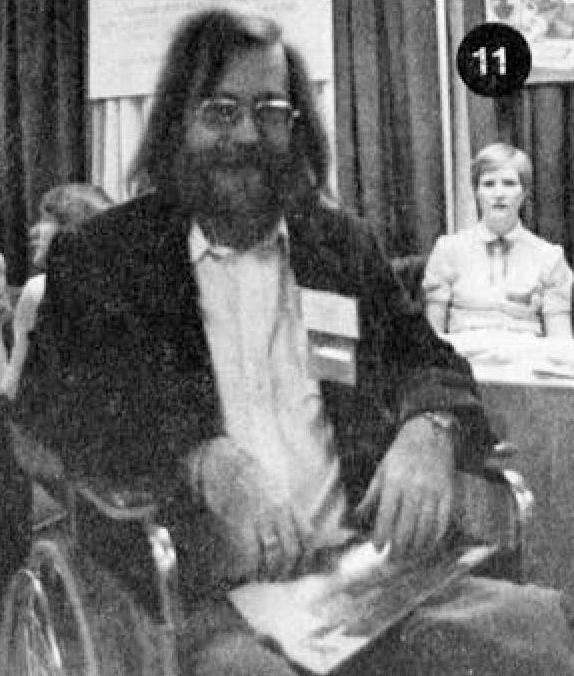
John Lyons

The development team consisted of Joel Billings and John Lyons (both shown in 1982), who founded Strategic Simulations together to create Computer Bismarck.

During college, Joel Billings used computers for econometrics, mathematical modeling and forecasting. This experience convinced him that computers could handle recreational wargames and remove tedious paperwork from gameplay; he had been a fan of board wargames since childhood. While between his undergraduate and graduate education in summer 1979, Billings met an IBM programmer and discussed computers. Billings suggested starting a software company with him, but the programmer was not interested in wargames, stating that they were too difficult and complicated to be popular. Billings posted flyers at hobby shops in the Santa Clara, California area to attract wargame enthusiasts with a background in programming. John Lyons was the first to reply and joined Billings after quickly developing a good rapport. The two founded Strategic Simulations using US$1,000 (equivalent to $4,436.04 in 2025) as startup money.

Billings chose the Bismarck's last battle because he felt it would be easier to develop than other wargames; he believed that the artificial intelligence for the hunting/chasing style of gameplay would require less development time. The developers drew inspiration from common conventions in historical simulation games when designing the gameplay. In retrospect, Billings noted that a computer would handle the gameplay better because it could withhold information about player moves from the opponent player to simulate the fog of war, whereas playing a board game required the two players to openly announce their moves.

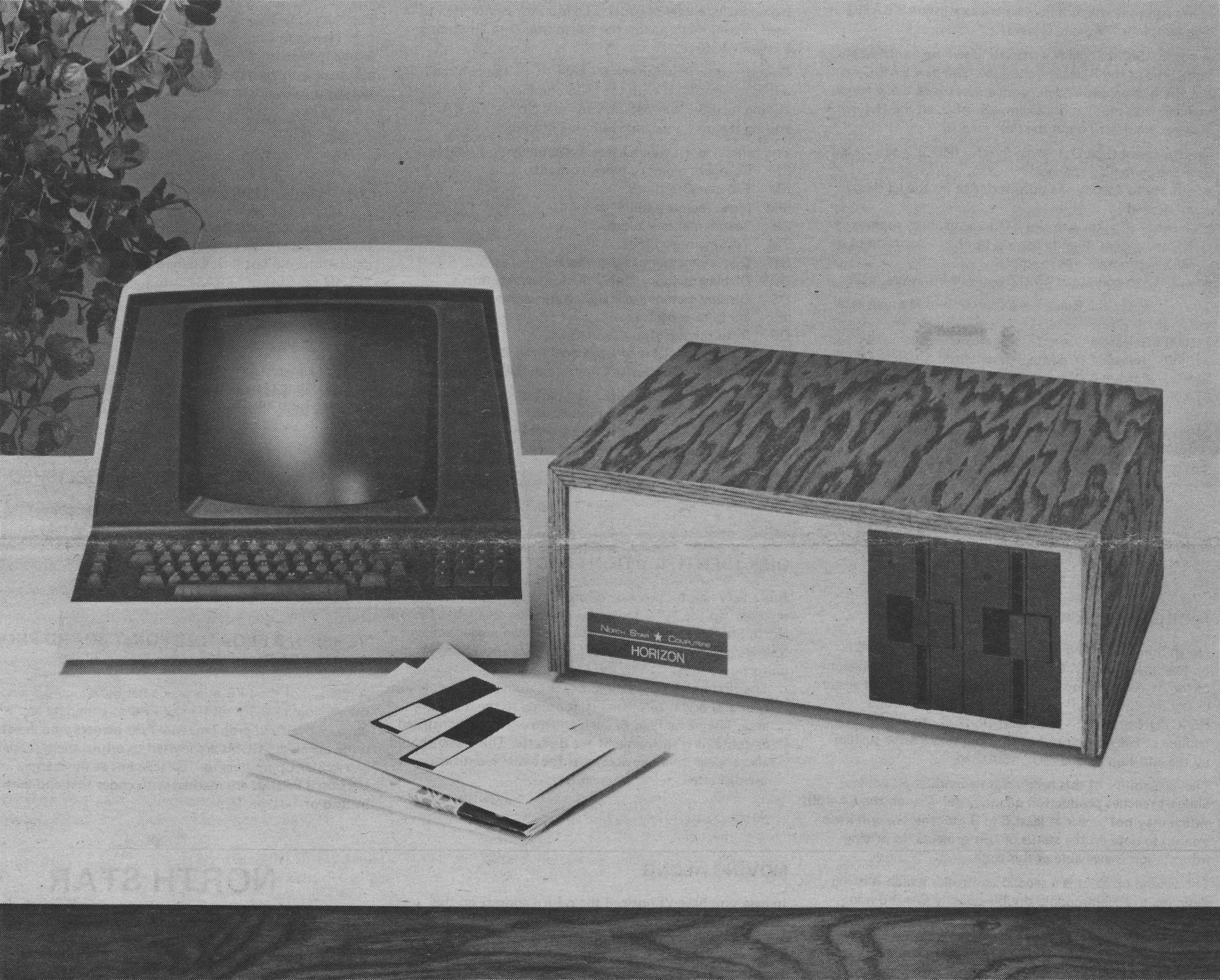
The developers programmed the game on a North Star Horizon computer (pictured) that Billings borrowed from work.

In August 1979, Billings borrowed a North Star Horizon computer from his work so Lyons could write the program. At the time, the two were working full-time and programmed at Billings' apartment during the night. Lyons did the bulk of the programming, while Billings focused on design and assisted with data entry and minor programming tasks. Dave Cook assisted with game design while Billings' father, Robert Billings, helped with historical information.

Computer Bismarck was written in BASIC and compiled to increase its processing speed. Lyons began programming a simplified version similar to a fox and hounds game—he had "hounds" search a playing field for a "fox". After determining a map size suitable for home computer displays, Lyons programmed the movement of the naval and air units before creating the combat mechanisms for two-player gameplay. The computer-controlled German opponent for the single-player mode was made afterward, which Lyons considered the most complex aspect of the game. In designing Otto von Computer, the developers had the computer pick different paths based on the possible scenarios and relied on their wargame expertise to determine the optimal move. During development, Lyons struggled to implement game saving. After the game grew larger, he placed the initial data for the military units into a separate file in order to reduce the game's file size. The developers then realized the same technique for loading the data could apply to information for an in-progress game and allowed the player create a save file.

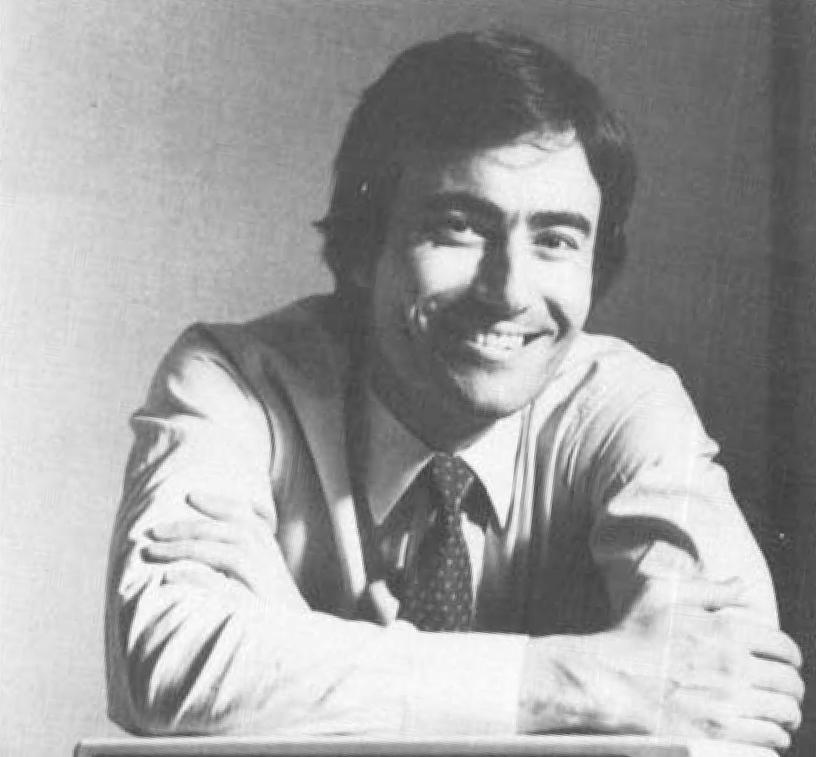
Trip Hawkins (shown in 1983) convinced Joel Billings to develop the game also for the Apple II computer.

The game was originally developed for the Tandy Corporation's TRS-80. When starting up SSI, Billing's uncle introduced him to venture capitalists. Two months into development, a venture capitalist connected Billings with Trip Hawkins, then a marketing manager at Apple Computer, who convinced Billings to develop the game for the Apple II. Hawkins commented that the computer's capacity for color graphics made it the best platform for strategy games and could reach a wider audience. Hawkins joined SSI's board of directors soon after. In October 1979, Billings' uncle gave him an Apple II. Billings and Lyons then converted their existing code to work on the Apple II and used a graphics software package to generate the game's map. Lyons considered the graphics the most challenging part of development.

== Marketing and release ==
After Lyons began programming, Billings started to study the video games market. He visited local game stores and attended a San Francisco gaming convention. Billings approached Tom Shaw from Avalon Hill—the company produced many wargames that Billings played as a child—and one of the founders of Automated Simulations to share market data but aroused no interest. The lukewarm responses made Billings believe he would have to publish SSI's games. After Computer Bismarck was finished in January 1980, he searched for a graphic designer to handle the game's packaging.

Billings met Louis Saekow through a string of friends but was hesitant to hire him. Inspired by Avalon Hill's games, Billings wanted SSI's games to look professional and include maps, detailed manuals, and excellent box art. Since he saw Computer Bismarck as an electronic wargame rather than a video game, Billings felt that wargame enthusiasts would expect presentation similar to board games. Two months prior, Saekow had postponed medical school to pursue his dream of becoming a graphic designer. To secure the job, Saekow told Billings that he could withhold pay if the work was unsatisfactory. In creating the box art, Saekow used a stat camera; his roommate worked for a magazine company and helped him sneak in to use its camera after hours. Saekow's cousin then handled printing the packaging. Without any storage for the complete products, Billings stored the first 2,000 boxes in his bedroom.

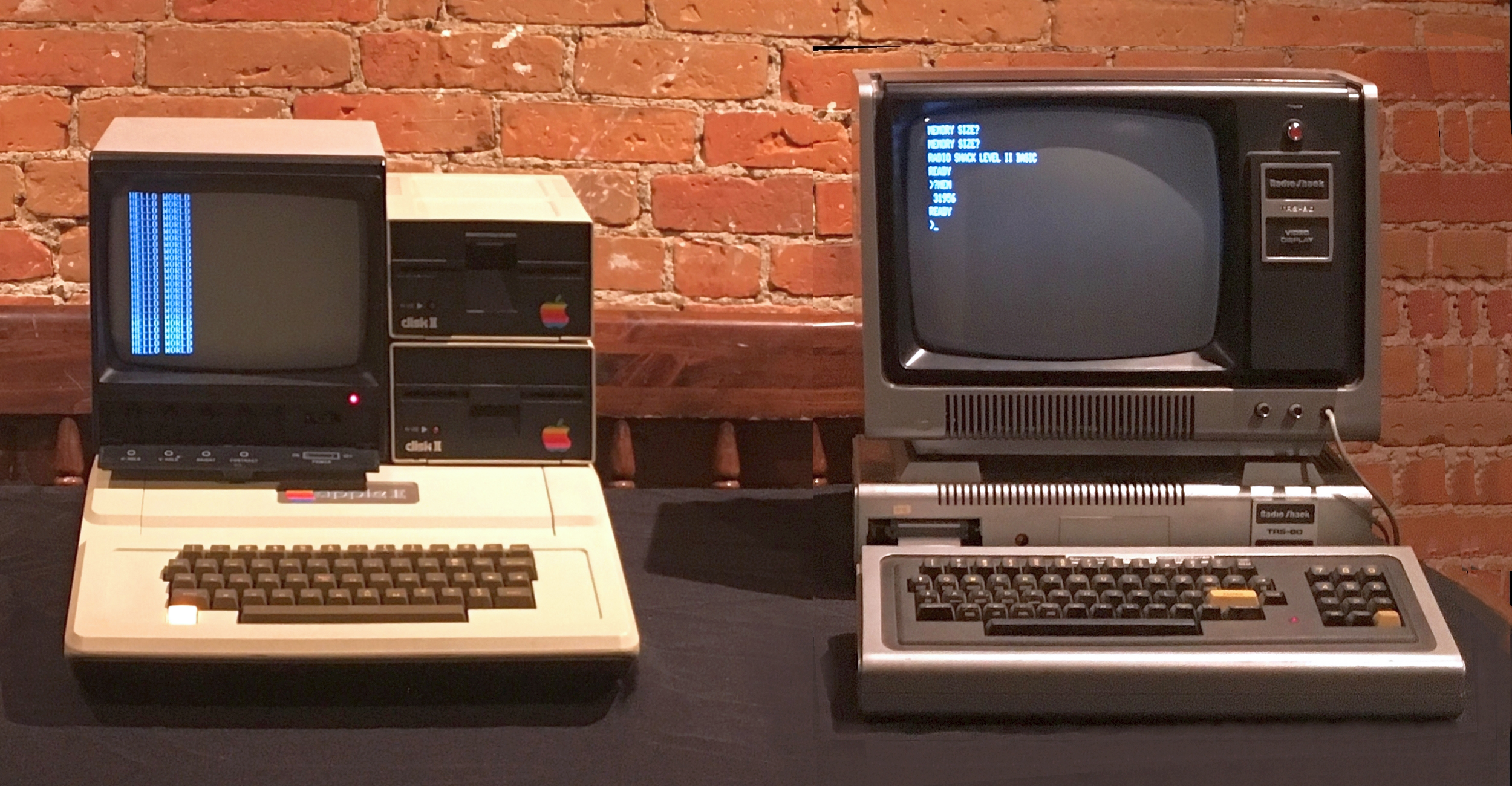
Strategic Simulations released Computer Bismarck on both the Apple II (left) and TRS-80 (right) home computers.

Through Hawkins, Apple Computer provided SSI a mailing list of Apple users. In February 1980, Billings distributed 30,000 flyers to Apple II owners, and displayed the game at the Applefest exposition a month later. SSI purchased a full-page advertisement for the Apple II version in the March 1980 issue of BYTE magazine, which mentioned the ability to save a game in progress as well as play against the computer or another person. The advertisement also promised future support for the TRS-80 and other computers.

Billings initially sold the game for $60 (equivalent to $234.45 in 2025), well above the $15–20 price ($58.61–78.15 in 2025) of other computer games as well as the $30 (equivalent to $117.23 in 2025) price of board games. He reasoned that the niche target market required a higher price; if potential buyers did not already own a home computer and the funds to do so, they would be unlikely to purchase his game. Billings initially planned to sell the game via mail order. However, the volume of orders during the first month prompted him to switch distribution to retail stores. To help with the switch, Hawkins provided Billings a list of Apple distributors. The game was later re-released in 1987 as part of the company's "SSI classics" line of popular games at discounted prices. By 1990, Computer Bismarck had sold 7,000 units.

== Reception ==
In 1980, Peter Ansoff of BYTE magazine called Computer Bismarck a "milestone in the development of commercial war games", and approved of the quality of the documentation and the option to play against the computer, but disapproved of the game. Acknowledging that "it is perhaps unfair to expect the first published [computer wargame] to be a fully developed product", he criticized Computer Bismarck for overly faithfully copying the mechanics of the Bismarck board game, including those that worked efficiently on a board but less so on a computer. Ansoff also noted that the computer game "perpetuates the [board game's] irritating system of ship-movement rates", and concluded that "the failings of Computer Bismarck can be summarized by saying that it does not take advantage of the possibilities offered by the computer". Moves magazine reviewer Ian Chadwick called it "engrossing" and praised the simulation's accuracy. While noting the excessive amount of time required to play a single game, Chadwick noted that Computer Bismarck requires patience and some gameplay changes could have reduced this time. He called the graphics "poorly drawn", but conceded that good visuals are not necessary.

The game was better received by other critics. Neil Shapiro of Popular Mechanics that year praised the game's detail and ability to recreate the complex maneuvering involved in the real battle. He referred to it as unique and "fantastic". In Creative Computing, Randy Heuer cautioned that the game "is probably not for everyone. The point which I probably cannot emphasize enough is that it is an extremely complex simulation ... However, for those ready for a [challenge] ... I enthusiastically recommend Computer Bismarck". Reviewing Computer Bismarck in The Space Gamer magazine, Joseph T. Suchar called the game "superb" and stated that "it has so many strategic options for both sides that it is unlikely to be optimized." United States Navy defense researcher Peter Perla in 1990 considered wargames like Computer Bismarck a step above earlier war-themed video games that relied on arcade-style action. He praised the addition of a computer-controlled opponent that such games provide to solitaire players.

The presentation received a mixed reception. While Suchar considered the graphics "excellent", Chadwick rated them a "C" and called the map "poorly drawn". Chadwick noted that the screen does not display the full game map and criticized the length of time required to redraw the map each phase. However, he felt that the gameplay did not require good graphics. Heuer praised the visuals, describing the map as "high-resolution" and "very well done". He felt the letters used to identify the units lacked sufficient detail but acknowledged this as a limitation of small computers at the time. Conversely, Shapiro considered the level of detail on the map suitable. Ansoff praised the game's packaging and included materials and drew attention to their professional quality in his review.

== Legacy ==
Commentators have ascribed SSI's early growth and success to Computer Bismarck. Perla attributes the company's success to the release of its early wargames, specifically citing Computer Bismarck. Computer Gaming World's Bob Proctor agreed that Computer Bismarck contributed to SSI's success, commenting that it earned the company a good profit. He also stated that it encouraged game enthusiasts to submit their own games to SSI, which he believed helped further the company's success. For example, the 1981 Computer Quarterback originated as a submission from Danielle Bunten Berry, who created other games for SSI afterward. Similarly, Jack Avery connected with the corporation by submitting an air combat game and then developed Computer Baseball for SSI in 1981. SSI reused the computer opponent, Otto von Computer, for its 1981 Torpedo Fire. One of the company's later games, the 1982 Pursuit of the Graf Spee, uses an altered version of Computer Bismarck's core system.

Computer Bismarck's release is considered a watershed moment for wargames. Proctor described it as the first "serious wargame for a microcomputer", and Ansoff stated it represented "a milestone in the development of commercial war games" by bringing the hobby into the computer age. Computer Gaming World staff believe that Computer Bismarck's success spurred Avalon Hill to enter the computer game market; the same year, the game company began releasing wargames for home computers. Proctor credited Computer Bismarck with helping to legitimize wargames and computer games in general. He stated that the professional packaging demonstrated SSI's seriousness to produce quality products; prior to Computer Bismarck, most computer games were packaged in zipper storage bags. Billings noted that about half a year after Computer Bismarck's release, other publishers began to package games in boxes. Following the game's success, Saekow became a permanent SSI employee and designed artwork for most of its products.

Ansoff and Chadwick noted the similarity of the game's mechanics to Avalon Hill's Bismarck board game. Ansoff stated that "it would seem proper as a matter of courtesy to acknowledge that the game was based on an Avalon Hill design." In 1983, Avalon Hill took legal action against SSI for copying game mechanics from its board games; Computer Bismarck, among other titles, was involved in the case. The two companies settled the issue out of court. Billings later donated the source code of several SSI games, including Computer Bismarck, to the International Center for the History of Electronic Games in December 2013 for preservation.

== See also ==
- Bismarck – 1987 video game based on the Bismarck's last battle developed by Personal Software Services
