= Pursuit of the Graf Spee (video game) =

1982 video game

- Publisher: Strategic Simulations
- Platform: Apple II
- Release: 1982
- Genre: Wargame

Pursuit of the Graf Spee is a 1982 video game published by Strategic Simulations for the Apple II.

== Gameplay ==
Pursuit of the Graf Spee is a game in which the Allies of World War II must sink the Graf Spee.

== Development ==
Pursuit of the Graf Spee uses an altered version of Computer Bismarck's core system.

== Reception ==
William Edmunds reviewed the game for Computer Gaming World, and stated that "The Pursuit of the Graf Spee is a good intermediate level war game. It combines a strategic game, its anguish of unsuccessful searching, with tactical battles which can produce the thrill of battle when you're finally closing in for the kill. This game characterizes many of the aspects of naval combat while being fast paced and easy to play."
