= Star General =

1996 video game

- Developer: Catware
- Publisher: Strategic Simulations
- Designer: Bill Fawcett
- Programmers: Matthew Fausey; Mike Isely; David Potter
- Composers: Danny Pelfrey; Rick Rhodes
- Platforms: MS-DOS, Windows
- Release: NA: December 6, 1996; EU: December 1996
- Genre: Computer wargame
- Mode: Single-player

Star General is a computer wargame, last in SSI's series of hexagonal-movement games popularized by Panzer General. Star General bases its story setting on The Fleet, a series of books written by David Drake and Bill Fawcett. The game was developed by Catware and SSI in 1996.

== Gameplay ==
Star General pits up to seven alien races against one another in a galactic battle of conquest. The seven races include the deceitful Cephalians, the reptilian Dragonians, the feline Hressa, the Humans, the barbarian Khalians, the insectoid Xritra, and fascist human separatists who belong to the Schleinel Hegemony.

There are 90 different types of units, from ground forces to spaceships. Among the space vessels there are a wide variety of specializations—including mine countermeasure vessels, assault vessels, troop transports, reconnaissance, battleships, missile boats, carriers and destroyers. There is also some use of older terms of reference for classifying warships—terms of reference that are not used in the navies of today. One example is that the term monitor is used to specify a kind of space warship. The general disposition of ship types is an approximation of navies in the era between the two world wars, before carriers became a major part of naval forces. On the planetary surface, there are space docks for launching ships, mines to produce monetary units, factories to manufacture ships, and industrial plants and biodomes to support population, as well as a range of ground forces, again roughly equivalent to military forces in mid to late 1930s to perhaps early WW2.

== Reception ==
Reception

Review scores
Publication	Score
Computer Games Strategy Plus	3.5/5
Computer Gaming World	2.5/5
PC Gamer (US)	86%

Star General sold at least 50,000 units by September 1997 and over 120,000 units by May 1999.

Computer Gaming World's Tim Carter panned the game as "all the flash and little of the gameplay" of what made the original a classic, but praised the clean interface, simple learning curve, and some fun moments in space fleet actions.

Star General was named the 85th best computer game ever by PC Gamer UK in 1997.
