= Allied General =

1995 video game

- Developers: Halestorm; Strategic Simulations
- Publishers: Strategic Simulations; Mindscape
- Designer: SSI Special Projects Group
- Programmer: Michael Fullerton
- Artists: Mitchel Pergola; John Weir
- Platforms: Windows, Macintosh, PlayStation
- Release: 1995
- Genre: Turn-based computer wargame
- Modes: Single-player, multiplayer

Allied General is a turn-based computer wargame set in World War II that features the Allied side of operations. It is a sequel to Panzer General. Players can progress through four campaigns as an Allied general against Axis forces controlled by the computer. In Germany, Allied General was titled Panzer General II, and Panzer General II was named Panzer General IIID.

== Gameplay ==
The playable campaigns include:

- A Soviet campaign, which features the Soviet invasion of Finland, known as the Winter War, the defenses of Moscow, and if successful, the counter-attack.
- A British campaign in North Africa against the German and Italian armies, beginning in Sidi Barrani.
- A British campaign, which can be played as the continuation of the first British campaign, which features the final Allied attack in Tunis on Mareth Line and the invasion of Europe.
- An American campaign, similar to the second British campaign, that begins with Operation Torch and continues to the invasion of Europe.

Individual scenarios can be played from either side.

Whereas the first Panzer General targeted DOS, Allied General was made for Windows. Allied General and Panzer General for Windows (an update to the DOS version) utilize a pop-up interface and share an underlying file system that differs from the original Panzer General. Fans created a version of Allied General, based on its own DOS version, that borrows interface features from the original Panzer General. Called Allied Panzer General, it includes all scenarios and campaigns from the original, as well as bugfixes.

== Reception ==
Reception

Review scores
Publication	Score
AllGame	3/5 (PS1)
Next Generation	4/5 (PC, PS1)
PC Gamer (US)	89%
PC Games	B
Computer Game Review	91/93/90

Allied General sold at least 50,000 units by September 1997.

Reviewing the Windows version, a Next Generation critic summarized that "Panzer General was one of the best-loved war games of last year, and Allied General is an improvement on an already great engine. For a sequel to such a prestigious title, however, there's really not much new here". He was pleased with the new Windows-specific features, such as being able to keep several windows open at once and change the game's resolution, as well as the improved e-mail play. He criticized that the weak AI is unimproved from Panzer General, but concluded the game to be worth getting for war game enthusiasts. Next Generation also reviewed the PlayStation version, opining that it "boasts much of what made [Panzer General] such a delight".
