= Panzer General III: Scorched Earth =

2000 video game

- Developer: Strategic Simulations
- Publisher: Strategic Simulations
- Designers: Chris Carr; Richard Wagenet
- Programmer: Carl Bevil
- Artists: Jacques Hennequet; Gennady Krakovsky
- Composer: Kevin Manthei
- Platform: Windows
- Release: NA: September 28, 2000; UK: September 29, 2000
- Genre: Computer wargame
- Modes: Single player, multiplayer

Panzer General III: Scorched Earth (2000) is a computer wargame by Mattel Interactive for Windows based on the game Panzer General 3D Assault.

== Gameplay ==
Panzer General III: Scorched Earth is set in World War II on the Eastern Front. It shares the same engine as Panzer General 3D Assault, although the graphics are improved. It is considered by some to be the eastern Front expansion for Panzer General 3D, which only deals with the western front. The game features four campaigns for German and Russian forces from Moscow to Berlin. Due to the success of Panzer General 3D, it kept the same leader management system. The player begins the game with a pool of leaders that grows as the game progresses. Each leader specializes in a particular equipment class.

== Reception ==
Reception

Review scores
| Publication | Score |
|---|---|
| Computer Games Magazine | 3.5/5 |
| Computer Gaming World | 2/5 |
| CNET Gamecenter | 6/10 |
