= Panzer General 3D Assault =

1999 video game

- Developer: Strategic Simulations
- Publisher: TLC Multimedia
- Platform: Microsoft Windows
- Release: NA: September 28, 1999
- Genre: Computer wargame
- Modes: Single-player, multiplayer

Panzer General 3D Assault is a 1999 computer wargame developed by Strategic Simulations, Inc (SSI) and published by The Learning Company. It is the third game in the Panzer General series, following Panzer General and Panzer General II.

== Gameplay ==
Panzer General 3D Assault is the third sequel to Panzer General. It features a new 3D engine. It is still turned based and has a similar game play style to Panzer General 2. The game features 8 new campaigns based on the western front. 3 German campaigns and 5 Allied, playing with the nations of Britain, France and America against the Germans. Panzer General 3D's Action Combat System gives player the ability to manipulate individual units and give multiple commands each turn.

== Development ==
The game used the game NetImmerse game engine from Numerical Design Ltd.

== Reception ==
Reception

Aggregate score
Aggregator	Score
GameRankings	80%

Review scores
Publication	Score
AllGame	3.5/5
CNET Gamecenter	5/10
Computer Games Strategy Plus	4/5
Computer Gaming World	3.5/5
GameSpot	7.9/10
IGN	7.6/10
Jeuxvideo.com	14/20
Next Generation	4/5
PC Gamer (US)	80%
PC Zone	84%

The game received favorable reviews according to the review aggregation website GameRankings. GameSpot characterized the game as "based on a good underlying system". Rick Sanchez of NextGen praised the game for the amount of multiplayer and single-player missions, the ability to play as the American, British, German and French forces, and the streamlined playing system.

The staff of Computer Gaming World nominated the game for their 1999 "Wargame of the Year" award, which ultimately went to Sid Meier's Antietam!

== Legacy ==
The game was re-released in 2010 on GOG.com.
