= Shrek 2 (video game) =

2004 video game

- Shrek 2 North American Microsoft Windows box art
- Developers: Luxoflux (console version); KnowWonder (Windows version); Beenox (Windows port of console version); Aspyr (Mac port of Windows version and the remaster); Vicarious Visions (GBA); Eurofun and DTR (mobile)
- Publishers: Activision (original); Aspyr (remaster)
- Directors: Joby Otero, Phillip Trumbo (PC)
- Producers: Liz Lehmans, Elizabeth Walkey (PC)
- Designers: Elizabeth Walkey, Amanda Brightley (PC)
- Artists: Peter King, Andrew Brinkworth (PC)
- Writers: Kelly Wand, Susan O'Connor, Liz Lehmans (PC)
- Composers: Kevin Manthei; Kevin Riepl; Rob Berry
- Engine: Unreal Engine 2 (original PC and Mac)
- Platforms: GameCube, PlayStation 2, Xbox, Game Boy Advance, Microsoft Windows, Mac OS X, mobile; Remastered; Microsoft Windows, Nintendo Switch, Nintendo Switch 2, PlayStation 5, Xbox Series X/S
- Release: NA: May 4, 2004; PAL: June 18, 2004; Mobile; NA: May 31, 2004; PAL: September 1, 2004; Remastered; WW: November 10, 2026
- Genres: Action-adventure, beat 'em up, platform
- Modes: Single-player, multiplayer

Shrek 2 (also known as Shrek 2: The Game and ported for the PC as Shrek 2: Team Action) is a 2004 action-adventure video game published by Activision, based on the DreamWorks Animation film of the same name. The game was developed by Luxoflux for the PlayStation 2, Xbox, and GameCube platforms, while a version for PC was developed by KnowWonder.

== Plot ==
Shrek 2's storyline follows a similar plot to that of the film. Shrek and Fiona are on a journey to the Kingdom of Far Far Away to visit Fiona's parents. Shrek's in-laws are unhappy that a crude ogre is married to their daughter Fiona and turned her into an ogre, and the battle for acceptance ensues. The game covers things not shown in the film. Plot elements are delivered primarily through a storybook interface (text and illustrations) shown before each level.

== Gameplay ==
=== GameCube, PlayStation 2, and Xbox versions ===
In this version of the game, the player is able to play as Shrek or his friends and travel through 11 levels. In each level, the player controls a team of four characters, and can switch between them at any point. Each character has a unique ability that aids them in fighting enemies or moving through the environment (for example, Donkey can destroy obstacles and Fiona can slow down time).

The game is broken into different chapters, each with its own set of goals. One chapter requires the player to make sure three blind mice safely make their way to the witch's house. Other chapters have the player acting as a deputy in Far, Far Away Land—collecting bits of Humpty Dumpty, stealing treasure from a troll, helping the police clear out rioting hooligans from the streets, escorting Cinderella while she window-shops for a glass slipper, ridding the town of the Pied Piper's rat infestation, collecting chickens for a stew, or battling Puss in Boots via timed button presses.

Players play mini-games when they are not traveling on hazardous paths from point A to point B. Challenges that require the player's entire party include having to punch chickens into cook pots or a pen, escorting characters through a stage (Billy Goat Gruff and the three blind mice), and collecting fairies, jewels, etc.

The second type of mini-game, dubbed "Hero Time", gives one character a challenge to complete, usually emphasizing that character's particular skills displayed in the movie. Donkey at one point has to chase a fleeing onion wagon while riding on the back of Dragon. Fiona holds a private concert for a flock of black birds she is collecting for a pie (via exploding them by rhythm based button presses). Shrek has to throw a bunch of thugs into a paddy wagon.

=== Game Boy Advance version ===
This version is a side-scroller developed by Vicarious Visions. The game is separated into five books (worlds), each with five chapters (levels). The story of the game is a compressed version of the movie it is based on. The playable characters are Shrek, Donkey, Puss in Boots, Human Shrek and Gingerbread Man, each with their own unique set of skills.

== Development ==
The game was first announced at E3 2003 in May that year, as a co-publishing collaboration between Activision and TDK Mediactive, the then-current video game license holder for the Shrek franchise, with Luxoflux announced to be developing the title. In December 2003, Take-Two Interactive purchased the North American operations of TDK Mediactive and rebranded them as Take-Two Licensing. With this, Activision terminated their publishing deal with TDK and instead announced a new partnership with DreamWorks for the Shrek license instead. Shortly after Activision announced that they would continue to work with DreamWorks to develop and publish several video games based on the upcoming movie, before they released the first trailer for the game in spring 2004.

Two versions of the game were released for the PC; one developed by KnowWonder for younger audiences using Unreal Engine 2, and the other a port of the original console release under the title Shrek 2: Team Action which was developed by Beenox.

The score for the game was composed by Kevin Manthei and Kevin Riepl. The soundtrack album consists of 58 tracks with over 65 minutes of score. It was released on May 6, 2004, by KMM Productions.

== Reception ==
Reception

Aggregate scores
| Aggregator | Score |
|---|---|
| GameRankings | (GBA) 72.56% (GC) 72.27% (PS2) 71.92% (Xbox) 71.29% (PC) 62.90% (Mobile) 49% |
| Metacritic | (GBA) 72/100 (Xbox) 72/100 (PS2) 71/100 (GC) 70/100 (PC) 55/100 |

Review scores
| Publication | Score |
|---|---|
| Electronic Gaming Monthly | 6.17/10 |
| Eurogamer | 5/10 |
| Game Informer | 7/10 |
| GamePro | 4/5 |
| GameRevolution | C+ (PS2) C |
| GameSpot | 6.8/10 (GBA) 6.4/10 (Mobile) 5.2/10 (PC) 4.5/10 |
| GameSpy | 3/5 (Mobile) 2/5 |
| GameZone | (Xbox) 8.5/10 (PS2) 8/10 (GC) 7.8/10 (PC) 5.9/10 |
| IGN | (GBA) 7.9/10; 7/10 (Mobile) 5.5/10 (PC) 3.9/10 |
| Nintendo Power | (GBA) 3.5/5 (GC) 3.3/5 |
| Official U.S. PlayStation Magazine | 3.5/5 |
| PC Gamer (US) | 75% |
| The Times | 4/5 |

Shrek 2 received "mixed to average" reviews from critics. GameRankings and Metacritic gave it a score of 72.56% and 72 out of 100 for the Game Boy Advance version; 72.27% and 70 out of 100 for the GameCube version; 71.92% and 71 out of 100 for the PlayStation 2 version; 71.29% and 72 out of 100 for the Xbox version; 62.90% and 55 out of 100 for the PC version; and 49% for the Mobile version.

IGN reviewer Mary Jane Irwin called the GameCube, Xbox, and PlayStation 2 versions of Shrek 2 "an amusing jaunt into the world of the movie," and Craig Harris, another reviewer of IGN, called the GBA version "an absolute treat, especially for those who dig the artstyle of the film," though he stated it to be "nothing new".

The game, along with fellow movie sequel based game published by Activision, Spider-Man 2, shipped more than five million units combined and were the best-selling titles of May and June, respectively.

In the United States, Shrek 2's Game Boy Advance version sold 700,000 copies and earned $18 million by August 2006. During the period between January 2000 and August 2006, it was the 35th highest-selling game launched for the Game Boy Advance, Nintendo DS or PlayStation Portable in that country.

By July 2006, the PlayStation 2 version of Shrek 2 had sold 850,000 copies and earned $26 million in the United States. Next Generation ranked it as the 70th highest-selling game launched for the PlayStation 2, Xbox or GameCube between January 2000 and July 2006 in that country. Combined console sales of the Shrek series reached 2.5 million units in the United States by July 2006.

Shrek 2 sold more than 4 million units.

During the 8th Annual Interactive Achievement Awards, the Academy of Interactive Arts & Sciences nominated Shrek 2 for "Console Children's Game of the Year". The game won for Favourite Video Game at the 2005 Kids' Choice Awards.

== Remastered ==
A remaster of the original console version of the game was released on November 10, 2026, with Aspyr both developing and publishing.

=== Reception ===
Reception

Aggregate score
| Aggregator | Score |
|---|---|
| Metacritic | (PS5) 58/100 |

Review scores
| Publication | Score |
|---|---|
| Push Square | 7/10 |
| WayTooManyGames | 6.0 |

The remaster received "mixed or average" reviews from critics on the PlayStation 5 version, according to review aggregator website Metacritic.

Sam Comrie of Push Square gave the remaster a 7 out of 10 and said "With a varied adventure, plenty of laughs, and the welcome addition of online co-op, this is a lovely reminder of when movie tie-in games could be just as entertaining as the films that inspired them."

In an average review from WayTooManyGames, Leo Faria wrote, "Shrek 2 Remastered is a high-quality product. Not only has it aged poorly, I also think Aspyr could/should have done better in its overall visual enhancements."
