= Fantasy General =

1996 video game

- Developer: Strategic Simulations
- Publisher: Mindscape
- Producer: Jan Lindner
- Designer: SSI Special Projects Group
- Programmer: Paul Murray
- Artist: David Jensen
- Composers: Danny Pelfrey; Rick Rhodes
- Platform: MS-DOS
- Release: March 11, 1996
- Genre: Computer wargame
- Modes: Single player, multiplayer

Fantasy General is a fantasy computer wargame published by Strategic Simulations in 1996. Its structure was taken from the game Panzer General with some modifications to the base system. It was the third in the Five Star General series. It allows gaming against other human players by email. It was published on GOG.com in May 2015 with support for Windows, macOS, and Linux after GOG Ltd acquired the copyright to the title.

A successor called Fantasy General II: Invasion was released by publisher Slitherine Software and developer Owned by Gravity in 2019.

== Gameplay ==
Fantasy General is a turn-based game situated in a high fantasy world. The player can play either a single scenario against a computer or human opponent or a campaign. There are two sides, Good and Evil, each with unique units, though they share unit equivalents.

In campaign mode, the player selects one of four heroes and sets out to defeat the Shadowlord and his four generals, evil counterparts to the heroes. It concludes with the liberation of four continents and final defeat of the Shadowlord at the Fire Isle.

Gameplay is based on a traditional hex map, with a wide variety of units available. Fantasy General is an operational-level game. Unlike Panzer General, where units represent battalion-size groups, Fantasy General units approximate squads, with most units consisting of fifteen soldiers, though some (e.g. heroes, mechanical forces) represent single entities.

=== Units ===
There are four unit categories: Mortal, Magical, Beast and Mechanical. Non-mortal units are usually stronger, but cannot be upgraded and will eventually become obsolete as the player researches new units.

In Campaign mode, the player allocates gold toward researching new grades of units. Units range in grade from 0 to 5, though not all categories of units have a unit available for every grade. Mechanical units, for example, are only available in grades 0, 1, 3, and 5.

Units are further divided into classes. The classes are Heavy Infantry, Light Infantry, Skirmishers, Cavalry, Light Cavalry, Archers, Bombardiers, Sky Hunters, Siege Engines, and Spell Casters. There are Mortal units available from grades 0 to 5 for every class. Other unit categories vary, though every category has Heavy Infantry, Cavalry, and Sky Hunter units available.

== Music ==
The soundtrack to Fantasy General was arranged by Rick Rhodes and Danny Pelfrey and featured soprano Marisa Lenhardt. The game's music featured original settings of Strife is O'er, the Dies Irae, the Easter sequence Victimae Paschali Laudes, Let All Mortal Flesh Keep Silence, Dona Nobis Pacem and two works by Johann Sebastian Bach, Komm, süßer Tod, komm selge Ruh and Wir essen und leben.

== Reception ==
Reception

Review scores
Publication	Score
Computer Gaming World	5/5
Next Generation	3/5
PC Gamer (US)	78%
Arcane	7/10
PC Magazine	4/4
Computer Games Strategy Plus	3/5
Computer Game Review	89/100
PC Games	B

Fantasy General sold at least 50,000 units by September 1997.

Fraser Brown from PC Gamer wrote of Fantasy General that it was a "wargame for people who rightly felt that the otherwise excellent Panzer General didn't have enough dragons". Computer Gaming World praised the game's pacing and AI, stating it challenged the player to think intelligently unlike other strategy games. They also praised the game's performance given how smoothly it ran. They did, however, also criticize the instability on Windows 95, simplified magic system, and lack of scenario descriptions but overall rated the game as equal or more to its predecessor. A reviewer for Next Generation commented that typical war simulation fans would likely be turned off by the game's unhistorical setting, lighthearted atmosphere, and lack of challenge, but that its solid sense of fun would make it entertaining for those willing to try something different.

Andy Butcher reviewed Fantasy General for Arcane magazine, rating it a 7 out of 10 overall. Butcher comments that "Fantasy General is good but not great - you can happily while away a few hours with it but it's unlikely to keep you up 'till three in the morning for 'one more go'".

Fantasy General was a finalist for the Computer Game Developers Conference's 1996 "Best Strategy/War Game" Spotlight Award, but lost the prize to Command & Conquer: Red Alert. It was a runner-up for Computer Gaming World's 1995 "Strategy Game of the Year" award, which ultimately went to Command & Conquer and Heroes of Might and Magic (tie). The editors called Fantasy General "addictive and deep enough to be the true heir to Panzer General's throne", and noted that it "could have won had the competition not been so strong".

== Sequel ==
Strategy publisher Slitherine Software and developer Owned by Gravity announced a sequel Fantasy General II: Invasion for Microsoft Windows in April 2019. The Steam port was released on 5 September.

The intention of Owned by Gravity was to resurrect the Fantasy General franchise. It was released in September that year. PlayStation 4 and Xbox One versions were released in 2020. A Nintendo Switch port was released on October 21, 2021.

The New Zealand magazine NAG called the game a "worthy, lovingly crafted successor". Strategy Gamer called it a "great success". Metacritic gave the game a weighted average score of 80 out of 100 based on 9 reviews, indicating "generally favorable reviews". Digitally Downloaded and 4Players gave positive reviews to the PS4 version. Onslaught, the first DLC, adds a new procedurally-generated campaign. It was released in March 2020. The second DLC, Empire Aflame, was added in October that year. The third DLC, Evolution, was released in February 2021.
