= Joel Billings =

American video game designer

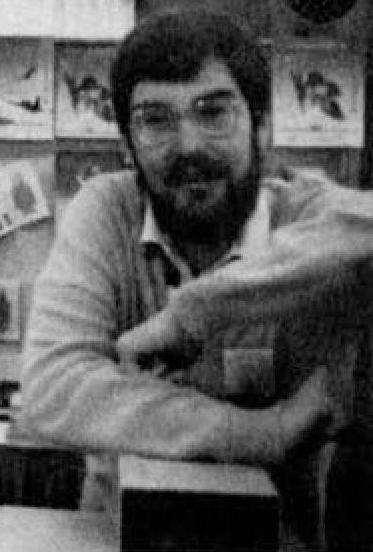
- Billings at the 1982 West Coast Computer Faire
- Occupations: Video game designer, producer
- Organization: Strategic Simulations
- Known for: Computer Bismarck

Joel Billings is an American video game designer and producer. He is the founder of the computer game company Strategic Simulations (SSI). He was also the company's president.

== Career ==
Joel Billings wanted to work with Avalon Hill to publish his computer wargame Computer Bismarck but they turned him down, so instead he decided to found a new company and publish the game himself. Billings started SSI in 1979 just after finishing college, with a $1000 initial investment. The first product was Computer Bismarck, which he co-wrote. Designed for the TRS-80 and Apple II home computers, it is viewed as the first computer war game ever published. It sold 7000 copies, considered reasonably successful for its time. The company was an industry leader for years in war games and role-playing video games.

In 1987 Billings acquired the rights to the Dungeons & Dragons role-playing games from TSR, which led to the creation of the Gold Box D&D game series, one of the best selling video game franchises of the 1980s and 1990s.

After a year of losses tied to delays in the new Dark Sun game engine, Billings sold the company to Mindscape in 1994.

In 2001 Billings started a game development company called 2 By 3 Games with former SSI game programmers Gary Grigsby and Keith Brors.

In December 2013, Billings donated several SSI video games, such as Computer Bismarck, including the source code, for preservation to the ICHEG.
