= MicroLeague Baseball =

1984 video game

- Developer: MicroLeague
- Publisher: MicroLeague
- Platforms: Amiga, Apple II, Atari 8-bit, Atari ST, Commodore 64, IBM PC
- Release: 1984
- Genre: Sports simulation
- Modes: Single-player, multiplayer

MicroLeague Baseball is a 1984 baseball simulation video game. It was developed and published by MicroLeague. It was released for Amiga, Apple II, Atari 8-bit computers, Atari ST, Commodore 64, and IBM PC compatibles.

== Summary ==
It was one of the first video games to carry the Major League Baseball license, allowing the game to feature MLB teams. It also carried the Major League Baseball Players Association license, allowing the game to use real players.

A general manager disk available separately allowed users to make trades with other teams or create their own players. A stat compiler disk allowed players to save the results of every played game and compile statistics for each player, allowing users to play an entire season. The game was unique for its time for its concentration on management. Things like batter stance and fielder placement were all possible for the first time in a licensed baseball game.

The original game came with a variety of all-time great teams, including the 1927 New York Yankees, 1945 Chicago Cubs, 1955 Brooklyn Dodgers, 1961 New York Yankees, 1963 Los Angeles Dodgers, 1967 St. Louis Cardinals, 1968 Detroit Tigers, 1969 New York Mets, 1970 Baltimore Orioles, 1973 Oakland Athletics, 1975 Cincinnati Reds, 1975 Boston Red Sox, 1979 Pittsburgh Pirates, 1980 Philadelphia Phillies, 1980 Kansas City Royals and the 1982 Milwaukee Brewers. Additionally, the game included an AL All-Time Greats team as well as an NL All-Time Greats Team. Further, the game also included the 1984 AL and NL All-Star Game rosters. The roster size for all teams was 15 hitters and ten pitchers.

== Reception ==
Computer Gaming World in 1985 praised MicroLeague Baseball's graphics but noted that it did not keep individual statistics. Ahoy! called it "a rock-solid stat game dressed up in visuals which would do any action baseball game proud", concluding that "MicroLeague Baseball is highly recommended for baseball-loving computerists".

== Reviews ==
- Games #70
