= Pacific General =

1997 video game

- Developer: Strategic Simulations
- Publisher: Strategic Simulations
- Designer: SSI Special Projects Group
- Programmer: Michael Coustier
- Artist: Mike Filippoff
- Platform: PC (Windows 95)
- Release: July 16, 1997
- Genres: Computer wargame, turn-based strategy
- Modes: Single player, multiplayer

Pacific General is a computer wargame depicting famous battles of the World War II Pacific campaigns. It was published by Strategic Simulations in 1997 using the same game engine of the earlier and successful Panzer General for Windows 95. It was re-released on GOG.com in May 2015.

== Gameplay ==
Pacific General (also known as "PacGen") is played on a hex map with icons representing aircraft, warships, tanks, and groups of soldiers. The turn-based style allows each player to strategize their next move. Combat involves various factors, like critical hits, surprise, and terrain. Particular attention is spent on naval warfare, where ships can sustain critical hits to ship systems and submarines can submerge to launch stealth attacks. The weather and time of day are also important factors to consider: darkness can obscure troop movements and rain can prevent airstrikes. Troops can sustain suppression from enemy fire, inhibiting their offensive and defensive abilities, and they can also entrench themselves, enhancing their defensive strength.

Players win by amassing victory points that are gained by occupying specific objective hexes. The side with the most victory points is declared the winner. Like role-playing games, the player can upgrade or add units to his core force, with the unit's experience carrying on to the next battle. He also must be aware of each unit's fuel and ammunition levels, and also the fog of war, the collective vision of all units under his control.

Prestige is the currency of the game. Prestige is gained by destroying enemy units and lost when a player buys or upgrades his units. Prestige is also available at the start of a new scenario before any combat begins.

Whereas the first Panzer General targeted DOS, Pacific General was made for Windows. Pacific General utilize interface and share an underlying file system that differs from the original Panzer General. Fans created a version of Pacific General, based on its own DOS version, that borrows interface features from the original Panzer General. Called Pacific Panzer General (PacPG), it includes all scenarios and campaigns from the original, as well as bugfixes.

The player can choose between the Allied and Axis sides in both real and hypothetical scenarios, like the Battle of Midway and Operation Downfall. Thirty-one countries are represented, including the United States, Japan, Germany, the United Kingdom, Australia, and the Soviet Union but only United States and Japan have campaign modes. Each nation has historical weapons available.

There are several types of unit categories: tanks, infantry, artillery, fighter aircraft, bombers, aircraft carriers, battleships, forts, etc. Infantry and towed weapons may have attached trucks or half-track transports and land units can be moved around the map on cargo ships or cargo planes. Most nations have several units in each category, and many are unique to each nation; the Japanese have kamikazes at their disposal. Each unit has specific entry dates to when they can be available to a player; the U.S. cannot field jet aircraft until the hypothetical invasion of Japan from late 1945 to 1946. Custom Equipment Rosters (referred to as "E-Rosters") have been made available for this game after initial release by third-party fan sites, increasing the number of units available for each nation as well as improved in-game graphics.

=== Scenarios and campaigns ===
The battles are only approximate representations of historical battles, where only a fraction of the participating forces are included. An Allies (United States) campaign and an Axis (Japan) campaign are included, as well as several other scenarios. A campaign is composed of many scenarios strung together. Similar to other titles in SSI's "General" series of wargames, players may find themselves commanding forces in hypothetical scenarios if they are much more successful than real-life commanders. For example, if Japanese players attain impressive victories, such as capturing Port Moresby or winning Battle of Midway for Japan, it's possible to invade Australia, Hawaii or even San Francisco, victories that historical Japanese commanders didn't come close to imagining.

The player can also create custom scenarios and campaigns, and a battle generator is available. Multiple fan-sites exist offering downloads of additional scenarios and campaigns.

The additional user-built campaigns include several German, several American, one Chinese, one Japanese, one Soviet, one British and two Italian campaigns.

== Reception ==
Reception

Review scores
| Publication | Score |
|---|---|
| Computer Games Strategy Plus | 3/5 |
| Computer Gaming World | 4/5 |
| PC Gamer (US) | 48% |

Like earlier games in the General series, Pacific General sold at least 50,000 units by September 1997.
