= Upshift Strikeracer =

2007 video game

- Developer(s): NChannel
- Publisher(s): Gala-net inc. (Through gPotato portal)
- Platform(s): Windows
- Release: World: 12 September 2007
- Genre(s): MMO racing
- Mode(s): Multiplayer (There's a time-trial mode on which the user plays alone)

Upshift Strikeracer (USR) was a MMO racing video game developed by South Korean studio NChannel and published by gPotato for PC. The game consists of multiple cars that race each other and features guns and other weapons that can be mounted to battle and race against other players. The game was released in Summer of 2007 by its publisher. The game service was terminated on 5 October 2010 due to expiration of licensing agreement.

== Game modes ==
=== Single and team races ===
The player can play independently against all the other players (up to seven) or as a part of one of two teams with equal number of players (up to four). In the single-player mode luck plays a very big role, whereas in team player mode strategy is more important.

=== Strikeracing ===
In Strikeracing, players race against each other to be first and may use weapons as a deterrent for their opponents. Some players opt for making as many takedowns as possible instead. This is one of the most commonly played modes.

=== Racing ===
This mode is similar to Strikeracing, but weapons are not allowed. This lets the players concentrate more on actual racing than trying to evade the opponents' weapons. In racing, players can refill their turbo by making drifts, so drifting is the most important skill.

=== Time attack ===
This game mode consists of the player racing without other opponents and without weapons to try the best time he can get. gPotato introduced a contest; any driver who wishes to participate donates 50 REP (reputation - In-game currency) if ranked 4 or higher. Lower ranks can play this for free so they can get to know the tracks before they start racing and getting shot at. At the end of each contest, the player that has the best time gets 50% of the total REP donated. The number 2 and 3 share the other 50% of the donated REP.
