= GOG.com =

Digital video game distribution platform

- Logo since 2014

- GOG.com homepage on 14 November 2024
- Company type: Private
- Website type: Digital distribution
- Available in: English, French, German, Polish, Russian, Simplified Chinese
- Founded: 22 February 2008; 18 years ago
- Headquarters: Warsaw, Poland
- Area served: Worldwide
- Owner: Michał Kiciński
- Managing director: Maciej Gołębiewski
- Parent: GOG sp. z o.o.
- Website: www.gog.com
- Advertising: No
- Registration: Required
- Launched: 2008; 18 years ago
- Current status: Active
- Native clients on: Microsoft Windows, macOS
- Written in: PHP, C++

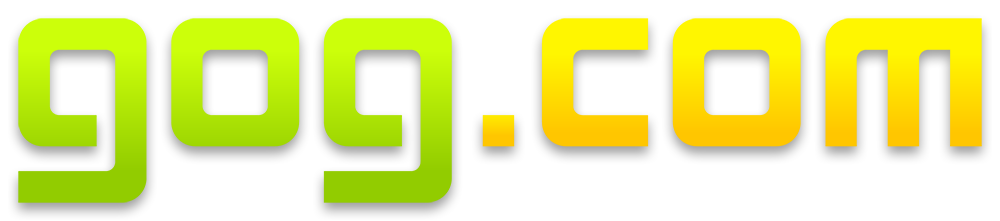
Logo from 2008 to 2014

GOG.com (formerly Good Old Games) is a digital distribution platform for video games and films. It is operated by GOG sp. z o.o., which was a wholly owned subsidiary of CD Projekt until December 2025, based in Warsaw, Poland. CD Projekt sold GOG to co-founder Michał Kiciński in December 2025.

GOG.com delivers DRM-free video games through its digital platform for Windows, macOS and Linux.

== History ==
=== Launch of Good Old Games ===
During communist government rule of Poland (the Polish People's Republic), copyright laws went largely unenforced, and copyright infringement was rampant across electronic media. Following the change of government, consumer perception of copyright in Poland remained largely the same, making it difficult for legitimate sellers of electronic media; pirated and bootlegged versions were often sold in open markets right next to boxed copies of legitimate items, but for a fraction of the cost.

CD Projekt was founded by Marcin Iwiński and Michał Kiciński in 1994 for the purpose of trying to bring legitimate sales of foreign game titles into Poland, knowing they would have no easy way to compete against pirated copies. They would obtain import rights from foreign publishers, and where possible, provide in-game localization for text and voice lines, typically through reverse engineering to decompile the game's code. They would then package the game with localized instruction manuals and other physical goodies, hoping that the added features would draw buyers away from pirated copies.

Their first major success was with Baldur's Gate (1998) with which they had 18,000 units sold on its first day of release in Poland. Due to this success, Interplay, the publisher of Baldur's Gate, asked CD Projekt if they could do a similar treatment to Baldur's Gate: Dark Alliance, a console title released in 2001. As their past work had been strictly on personal computers, the company accepted to try to port it, but the project fell through before it was completed. However, as a result, CD Projekt realized they had the ability to make their own games, and moved into games development. This eventually proved fruitful, as it ultimately granted the company the rights to The Witcher video game series. The company's interest in game distribution has declined since then.

Digital distribution grew in the 2000s, along with the use of DRM to control access to games, which raised some resentment with players. CD Projekt saw potential to look back at their distribution days to offer DRM-free versions of classic games through digital distribution, using their past experience in reverse engineering to make the games work on modern platforms and provide a wide array of localization options. In this manner, they would have a reason to draw players to buy their product instead of simply downloading it for free from pirate game websites and services. They founded a new subsidiary, Good Old Games, to serve this purpose in early 2008.

Their first challenge was to find a publisher that would be willing to work with them. They spoke to several who were generally unaware of CD Projekt. Their first big break was from Interplay Entertainment, who knew of the company's past work, and allowed them to offer their games on the service. After some time, Good Old Games was approached by Ubisoft, who were interested in selling their older titles through the service as well. Once Ubisoft was signed, it became easier for Good Old Games to convince other publishers to allow them to offer older titles on the service.

=== Marketing stunt and relaunch ===
From 19 to 22 September 2010, the GOG.com website was disabled, leaving behind messages on the web site and their Twitter accounts that the site had been closed. A spokesman for Good Old Games reiterated that the site was not being shut down, and confirmed news would be forthcoming about changes to the service. A clarification posted on the site on 20 September 2010 said they had to shut down the site temporarily "due to business and technical reasons", with industry journalists believing the shutdown may be related to the nature of DRM-free strategy, based on Twitter messages from the company.

On 22 September 2010, GOG.com revealed that this shutdown was a marketing hoax as part of the site coming out of beta. The site's management, aware of the reactions to the fake closure, stated: "First of all we'd like to apologize to everyone who felt deceived or harmed in any way by the closedown of GOG.com. As a small company we don't have a huge marketing budget and this is why we could not miss a chance to generate some buzz around an event as big as launching a brand new version of our website and even more important, bringing back Baldur's Gate to life!"

The site returned on 23 September 2010, with an improved storefront and additional benefits, as outlined during a webcast presentation. During the presentation, GOG.com's co-founder Marcin Iwiński and managing director Guillaume Rambourg had dressed as monks to atone for their sins. The relaunch of the site was considered by Rambourg to have been successful, having brought new customers that were previously unaware of GOG.com. As promised after its relaunch, GOG.com was able to offer several Black Isle Studios games such as Baldur's Gate, Planescape: Torment and Icewind Dale which have previously been unreleased through any download service due to legal issues about the ownership of Dungeons & Dragons-related games between Atari, Hasbro, and other companies.

On 27 March 2012, Good Old Games announced that it was branching out to feature "AAA" and independent titles in addition to older games. The site was rebranded to GOG.com.

=== OS X and Linux support ===
In October 2012, GOG.com announced support for OS X. They included the previously Steam exclusive (OS X version) The Witcher and The Witcher 2, both made by CD Projekt Red. GOG.com gathered user feedback in a community wishlist, and one of the most demanded feature requests was support for native Linux games, which gathered close to 15,000 votes before it was marked as "in progress". Originally GOG.com representatives said, that there are technical and operational issues which make it harder than it seems, however it's something they would love to do, and they have been considering. On 18 March 2014, GOG.com officially announced that they would be adding support for Linux, initially targeting Ubuntu and Linux Mint in the fall of 2014. On 25 July 2014, Linux support was released early, and 50 games were released compatible with the operating system.

=== Expansion to DRM-free video ===
On 27 August 2014 GOG.com announced the launch of the new addition to their service – distribution of DRM-free films. GOG.com offers DRM-free downloading in mp4 format and streaming of video in standard and DRM-free HTML fashion which doesn't bind users to any specific platforms or devices. Movies are made available in Full HD 1080p, 720p and 576p for limited bandwidth or download quotas; however, a few titles do not have the Full HD 1080p format available.

GOG.com started by adding 21 documentaries about Internet culture and gaming. They also have plans for adding fiction films and series; according to GOG.com's managing director Guillaume Rambourg, they were in talks with many major studios. While studios' representatives liked the idea, they also were reluctant to let go of their current DRM approach until some other major studio would make the first step. Still GOG.com plan to work on overcoming the initial reluctance and moving DRM-free video forward.

=== Policies ===
On 9 December 2013, GOG.com introduced a money-back guarantee for the first 30 days if customers face unresolvable technical problems with a bought game. On 26 February 2020, GOG extended this policy to offer a full refund up to 30 days after purchasing a product, even if it was downloaded, launched, and played.

Beginning 2 April 2015, GOG.com began to offer DRM-free downloads to holders of game keys from boxed copies of select games whose DRM validation systems no longer operate; examples are the S.T.A.L.K.E.R. series and the Master of Orion series. Over $1,700,000 of retail game purchases had been redeemed through this system by November 2017.

=== FCK DRM Initiative ===
In August 2018, GOG created an anti-digital rights management program called "FCK DRM". The homepage of the initiative offers links to the websites of Defective by Design, the EFF, Bandcamp, itch.io, Wikisource, Project Gutenberg and other projects that promote free culture.

=== Layoffs and end of the Fair Price Package ===
In February 2019, GOG announced layoffs and the end of its Fair Price Package program. When a game was purchased in a region with higher prices than most others, this program would provide the purchaser with store credit equal to the difference in price.

Some insider sources in GOG told Kotaku that GOG was "dangerously close to being in the red" and that the market's move toward higher developer revenue shares would affect the company's profitability.

=== Partnerships with cloud streaming services ===
On 19 November 2020, Nvidia and GOG announced a collaboration that allows GOG.com users to launch Cyberpunk 2077 through the cloud gaming service GeForce Now. Both companies announced they also expect to support The Witcher 3: Wild Hunt in the future and that they "have more news coming soon".

On 18 March 2024, GOG announced a partnership with Amazon to integrate their large library of games directly into the cloud gaming service, Amazon Luna. Then on 19 June, the first wave of GOG games were integrated into the streaming platform, including Deus Ex: Mankind Divided, Stardew Valley, and Hollow Knight, with more games to come later on. According to GOG, users will need an active Prime or Luna+ subscription to access their library through the service, but will not need to repurchase their games through Luna to play them. Additionally, supported games purchased through Luna will be automatically added to the user's GOG library.

=== GOG Preservation Program ===
On 13 November 2024, GOG launched the GOG Preservation Program, an initiative aimed at ensuring the continued availability and compatibility of classic video games on modern and future systems. The program, introduced to coincide with GOG's 16th anniversary, initially launched with over 100 titles. The GOG Preservation Program formalizes GOG's past efforts to restore and update classic games. In previous years, the company had already worked on several titles (such as Alpha Protocol, Wing Commander III: Heart of the Tiger and the original Resident Evil trilogy), addressing various technical issues with the PC releases.

Soon after the launch of the Preservation Program, Blizzard requested the removal of Warcraft 1+2, two games listed under the preservation program. This decision resulted in user backlash targeted at Blizzard from GOG customers, generally believing the decision went against the goals of the Preservation Program. GOG announced a partnership with the European Federation of Video Game Archives, Museums, and Preservation in January 2025 to support its ongoing preservation efforts. GOG also unveiled the "Dreamlist" feature the same month, which allowed players to raise awareness by prompting publishers and rights owners to release their classic games into the GOG storefront. In October 2025, GOG partnered with SPhotonix, a company developing long-term optical data storage technologies, to preserve Heroes of Might and Magic III: Complete using 5D memory crystal technology. It became the first known instance of a computer game being stored using this form of eternal physical data storage.

=== Anti-censorship initiatives ===
In August 2025 GOG launched the Freedom To Buy initiative in response to Steam and itch.io removing games from their platforms due to pressure from payment processors Visa and Mastercard. In co-operation with other games publishers, a bundle of 13 games containing adult content was made available for free for 48 hours as a way of "taking a stand against the quiet erasure of creative works from digital shelves."

Later the same year, GOG vocally supported Santa Ragione's horror game "Horses" after Valve refused to publish it on Steam without explanation, stating “We’ve always believed that players should be able to choose the experiences that speak to them." With Valve's decision leaving the studio at a "high risk" of closure, GOG featured it prominently on the website and announced that in order to “support the Santa Ragione studio in this difficult time, we’ve decided to launch pre-orders on Horses".

=== Sale to original co-founder ===
GOG.com was sold by CD Projekt to Michał Kiciński, one of the original founders of GOG, in December 2025. The sale allows GOG to remain independent of CD Projekt, though the studio will continue to support GOG for its games. With its independence, GOG intends to focus more on preservation of video games while maintaining its ongoing support for DRM-free games.

== Approach ==
GOG.com works to offer older games as well as new releases to users, with the product lacking any type of digital rights management to give consumers the ability to install the game anywhere and as many times as they want.

Prior to any development work to bring an older game for use on modern computers, legal experts within GOG.com need to track down all ownership rights to games and make sure that all necessary parties agree to their redistribution. This can be difficult for many games of the late 1990s and early 2000s, where very few publishers and developers kept digital records of their legal documentation, and there were large numbers of acquisitions and dissolutions that make tracking down rights difficult and take years to complete. One difficult case was acquiring the rights for the Strategic Simulations "Gold Box" series games, due to the number of acquisitions that Strategic Simulations went through since the 1990s.

GOG.com offers users a means to request back-catalog games they would like to see, and the company uses this list to identify games that may require more extensive licensing research. Some of this work has been done in coordination with Nightdive Studios, who were able to find and acquire the rights to System Shock 2, one of the most requested games at GOG.com for years, and have since found and relicensed other older games thought lost to licensing issues.

In order to ensure compatibility with newer versions of operating systems and current PC hardware, games are pre-patched and restored by GOG.com. Whenever possible, GOG.com attempts to acquire the game's original source code, which can prove as difficult as determining the legal rights to games. From this, they can work to make the game compatible with modern and future hardware, directly apply compatibility fixes, and sometimes incorporate well-established community-made patches from a game's fan-community. They also seek external help with some of the code issues, approaching developers that may have previously worked on the title. They may also need to reverse engineer the game's code if it is not available. In cases where it is impossible to recode the game, they will instead package the game with open-source emulation or compatibility software, such as ScummVM and DOSBox.

For newer titles, particularly for indie games, GOG.com offers the ability to publish their games on the site starting 2013. GOG.com offers indie developers a typical 70/30 split on revenue (meaning GOG.com takes 30% of the sale), as well as an option for an upfront payment to the developer, with GOG.com then taking 40% of the sales until the upfront payment has been covered, reverting the cost back to 30%. Such games are still distributed DRM-free.

=== Publishing agreements ===
On 26 March 2009, GOG.com announced it had signed a deal with Ubisoft to publish games from their back catalogue; this was the first deal with a major publisher to offer DRM-free downloads. The deal to publish through GOG.com also included games that were not available through any other online distribution channel.

On 5 September 2014, GOG.com started to sell Amiga games from Cinemaware's catalogue, starting with Defender of the Crown. This was technically made possible through Cinemaware's own written emulator called "Rocklobster".

On 28 October 2014, GOG.com was able to secure another major publisher as a DRM-free partner, Disney Interactive / LucasArts. With this new partnership, GOG.com began to re-release several often-requested game titles from LucasArts, starting with six titles (Star Wars: X-Wing, Star Wars: TIE Fighter, Sam & Max Hit the Road, The Secret of Monkey Island: Special Edition, Indiana Jones and the Fate of Atlantis and Star Wars: Knights of the Old Republic). On 5 May 2015, GOG.com released Pacific General and Fantasy General and named itself, GOG Ltd, as the publisher. The company revealed that it had acquired the copyright to these titles and that it intends to acquire more in the future.

On 26 August 2015, Bethesda Softworks joined GOG.com with classic titles as id Software's Doom and Quake, Fallout (which had been sold on GOG by Interplay before the rights changed hands), and also some classic Elder Scrolls titles.

In March 2019, Blizzard Entertainment joined GOG.com with classic titles Diablo, Warcraft: Orcs & Humans and Warcraft II: Battle.net Edition, with Diablo: Hellfire joining later on 5 June 2019.

On 25 September 2020, GOG.com announced the comeback of three Metal Gear titles (Metal Gear, Metal Gear Solid, and Metal Gear Solid 2: Substance) as well as the Konami Collector's Series: Castlevania & Contra from Konami. In November 2021, Metal Gear Solid 2: Substance was later pulled from the storefront due to Konami's licensing issues with the game, and has not returned since.

On 8 September 2021, GOG brought 6 classic Star Trek titles back and updated them to work on modern operating systems.

According to the Management Board report on the activities of the CD Projekt Group in 1H 2021, the GOG.com catalog of products as of 1 September 2021 numbers over 5200 items. However, the business expansion didn't bring enough revenues to cover the rising costs - between January 2021 and September 2021, GOG lost $1.14 million. Due to poor financial performance GOG.com management announced the plan to scale down, focusing on "a handpicked selection of games" and moving staff to other projects within CD Projekt.

== Features ==
The offered digital goods (video games and movies) can be purchased and downloaded online and they are distributed without digital rights management. The prices of products typically range from about $5 to $10 for older games, along with special offers in sales held several times a week. Some newer titles have a higher price. GOG.com's digital products can also be given to other persons via redeemable gift certificates.

The user does not have to install special client software to download or run the games, although a download manager, which is due to be phased out, and the GOG Galaxy client, which is currently in beta, are available. After downloading, the customer is free to use the software for any personal use like installing on multiple devices, archiving on any personal storage media for unlimited time, modding and patching; with the restriction that reselling and sharing is not permitted.

The software installers are technically independent of the customer's GOG.com account, although still subject to GOG.com's EULA, where a "licensed, not sold" formulation is used. The "licensed, not sold" model frequently raises questions of ownership of digital goods. In the European Union, the European Court of Justice held that a copyright holder cannot oppose the resale of a digitally sold software, in accordance with the rule of copyright exhaustion on first sale as ownership is transferred, and questions therefore the "licensed, not sold" EULA.

Along with the games, customers are also able to download numerous extra materials relating to the game they purchased. Often these extras include the game's soundtrack (partly as FLAC), wallpapers, avatars, and manuals. GOG.com also offers full customer support for all purchases and a money-back guarantee for the first 30 days.

Promotions are organized regularly. The style of these promotions varies from a discount for products that are bought in bundles, to thematic competitions like riddles, "guess a game from a picture" contests or "best time on a specific level". Also, GOG.com gives away promotion codes for a game with review contests.

GOG introduced for "One-click Mod" support for game modifications in June 2025, allowing users to easily download and install from a curated selection of mods for select games, as long as the user already has purchased the base title on GOG. Mods range from those that improve the player experience by fixing game bugs or user-interface problems with the game as shipped, through those that provide new content including total conversions. GOG included support for popular mods, such as Skyblivion, a mod for The Elder Scrolls V: Skyrim that recreates the content from The Elder Scrolls IV: Oblivion into Skyrim's engine.

=== GOG Galaxy ===
In the CD Projekt Red company update in June 2014, GOG.com announced that it would be bringing a Steam-like client, GOG Galaxy, to Windows, Mac, and Linux platforms. The client is designed as a storefront, software delivery, and social network client, allowing players to buy and play games from GOG.com and share them with friends. GOG Galaxy also includes an original multiplayer API, allowing developers to include the same kind of multiplayer functionality in GOG.com versions of games as on Steam. The client is optional and retains the DRM-free objective of the GOG.com website.

On 15 October 2014 the open multiplayer beta of the GOG Galaxy client was started, accompanied by the giveaway of Alien vs Predator. In July 2015 the GOG Galaxy beta client was reviewed favorably by the PC Gamer magazine, especially noting the focus on user respect in comparison to Steam. On 22 March 2017, the client added in cloud saves for 29 games from its catalog. GOG Galaxy is currently available for Microsoft Windows and macOS, with a Linux version formerly marked as planned on the Galaxy subpage but stated to not be a priority. As of the Galaxy 2.0 revamp of the subpage, any mention of future Linux support has been removed from the FAQ.

In May 2019, GOG announced plans for GOG Galaxy 2.0, which it aims to be a unified game launcher not only for GOG titles, but from other services such as Steam, Origin, Uplay, Epic Games Store, and including console systems through Xbox and PlayStation networks. It has an open API, so users can also create additional plug-ins for it. At E3 2019, GOG affirmed that Microsoft was an official partner, which will allow GOG Galaxy 2.0 to have strong incorporation with Xbox and Xbox Game Pass titles. The new client entered a closed beta period in June 2019, and open beta in December 2019.

On 20 July 2020, GOG announced official integration with the Epic Games Store for GOG Galaxy 2.0.

=== GOG Connect ===
Revealed in June 2016, GOG Connect enabled users with both GOG.com and Steam accounts to claim certain games they already owned on Steam as part of their GOG.com library, allowing them to download the DRM-free version and other bonus items for that game offered by GOG.com. Not all such games were part of this offer, as it required GOG.com to work with the game publishers to enable this. The time to claim such games was limited, though once a user had claimed their game on GOG.com, it remained permanently accessible in their library. GOG discontinued GOG Connect in January 2023 as the service had been effectively inactive for several years with no new titles offered for connection.

== Market share ==
While GOG.com does not release sales figures, some developers occasionally post their game's sales numbers, broken down by distribution platform:

- In an article dated 11 November 2011, PC Gamer reported statistics for online sales of The Witcher 2. According to PC Gamer: Direct2Drive, Impulse and GamersGate's combined sales were a total of 10,000 (4%), GOG.com sold 40,000 copies (16%), while Steam sold in the same time period 200,000 copies (80%).
- On 20 February 2013, Defender's Quest developer Lars Doucet revealed the first three months of revenue following his game's release across six different digital distribution platforms, including four major digital game distributors and two methods of purchasing and downloading the game directly from the developer. The results showed that GOG.com generated 8.5% of the revenue – second only to Steam's 58.6% among the digital distribution platforms used. Doucet noted that "for the major [digital game distributors], GOG's star is clearly rising. Even under direct competition, GOG generated 14.5 percent as much revenue as Steam. [...] Steam enjoys a captive market of ardent loyalists, but GOG is swiftly becoming an attractive alternative and gaining loyalists of its own, especially in the anti-DRM crowd."
- In early 2021, it was announced that GOG.com was responsible for around 10% of the total PC sales of Cyberpunk 2077. In terms of pre-orders GOG.com accounted for one-third of early PC pre-orders.

== Controversies ==
=== Issues over release of Devotion ===
Devotion from the Taiwanese studio Red Candle Games had previously been removed from digital storefronts in early 2019 after it was found the game included content critical of Xi Jinping, the General Secretary of the Chinese Communist Party and faced numerous complaints from Chinese gamers. Red Candle Games apologized and stated they would remove the content, but had not been able to bring the game back. In December, Red Candle and GOG had announced that GOG would offer Devotion later that month, but within a few hours of the announcement, GOG reversed its decision, stating that they reconsidered this "after receiving many messages from gamers". The move was met with criticism and accusations of censorship.

=== Hitman (2016) release ===
On 17 September 2021, the Game of the Year edition of Hitman was released on the storefront. While the game could be played offline, a large amount of its content required an internet connection. Following backlash and heavy review bombing from gamers, GOG issued a statement explaining they were looking into the situation, and on 8 October, they removed the game from their storefront, stating they "shouldn't have released it in its current form".

=== Use of Nazi symbolism ===
On 5 June 2026, an email from the company newsletter promoting the game The End of the Sun featured SS runes in its title. The company later acknowledged that this had been noticed before publication, leading to the email being only sent outside of Germany, where the usage of such symbols is outlawed. GOG apologized for the "unfortunate visual association".
