= Panzer General II =

1997 video game

- Developer(s): Strategic Simulations
- Publisher(s): Strategic Simulations
- Designer(s): SSI Special Projects Group
- Programmer(s): Russell Brown
- Composer(s): Kevin Manthei; Steven Methy
- Platform(s): Microsoft Windows
- Release: NA: October 15, 1997
- Genre(s): Computer wargame
- Mode(s): Single-player, multiplayer

Panzer General II is a computer wargame by Strategic Simulations, Inc. Released October 15, 1997, Panzer General II is the sixth SSI game in the Panzer General series and the first in the "Living Battlefield" series. It takes place during World War II, covering events from the Spanish Civil War in 1938 to hypothetical battles in 1946. In the April 2000 issue of the magazine PC Gamer, it was voted the 44th best computer game of all time, and the highest rating in the Panzer General series. The game was re-released in 2010 on GOG.com.

== Gameplay ==
The game of Panzer General II is divided into scenarios, each representing a specific battle. All are played on a hex map, which is divided up into hexagons that represent between one and two kilometers. At the beginning of the game, the entire map is revealed to the player, but enemy units are covered by fog of war and are not visible.

Each hex is assigned one of thirteen terrain types that penalize or assist the movement of units. Mountain, city, and forest types block line of sight. The game also features four kinds of capturable hexes marked by a flag indicating the country owning it: ownership, designating a player's ownership of a city, town or other important feature; supply, allowing unit deployment; victory, indicating critical cities or objectives; and victory-supply, combining victory and supply. The objective is to defeat an enemy by capturing all of their victory hexes in a specified number of turns.

The player attacks enemies and captures hexes by moving units, which approximately represent a battalion, regiment or squadron. There are eight types of units, each with different properties: Infantry, Tank, Anti-Tank, Recon, Air Defense, Fighter, Artillery, and Bomber. Each unit is assigned a numerical value to represent its movement (in hexes); its line of sight (in hexes); its attack abilities against armored targets, unarmored targets, ships, and airplanes; its defense against ranged, close, and air attacks; as well as values for initiative and remaining ammunition and fuel. The final value, health, is represented by a number, usually 1 to 10. When attacking or defending, the unit receives experience points based on the amount of damage inflicted to its enemy (also some points are received when damage is caused by the enemy). Each 100 experience points correspond to one experience level (a value ranging from 0 to 5). When attaining a higher level, the unit may also receive a famous leader, granting it some special abilities. The in-game currency used to measure unit buy and upgrade costs is called "prestige". It is gained by capturing scenario objectives or as a reward for a quick and decisive victory.

The standard game contains many real-life scenarios; however, similarly to other games of the series, players will be able to play some hypothetical scenarios if they perform exceptionally in their command career. For example, Germany can invade and capture the British Isles by capturing Windsor or they can invade Malta with Italy. Again, if the player attains victories in the east and defeats the Soviet Union, Germany can invade the United States from the Port of Savannah and then march to Oak Ridge, Tennessee to capture a prototype of a US atomic bomb.

The player's pieces are carried between scenarios: optimizing what is effective in one scenario (say aircraft) may lead to problems in a subsequent scenario where what is effective differs. Optimal strategies, especially between the scenarios in a campaign, can be complex.

=== Changing game characteristics ===
At the beginning of a scenario or a campaign, the player can select the number of points gained for capturing supply points (this, in turn, affects how many units and how strong the player units are). The manual states that the intention is to make for a more or less challenging game, but the actual effect is rather different since to some degree the computer player adjusts strategy to compensate for the human player's strengths.

The player is also allowed to choose which side to play in individual scenarios (but not in campaigns).

== Reception ==
Reception

Review scores
Publication	Score
Computer Games Strategy Plus	4/5 stars
Computer Gaming World	5/5 stars
PC Gamer (US)	93%

Panzer General II's initial shipment of 100,000 copies sold out within roughly one week of the game's release. In the United States, the game sold 42,481 copies during 1997.

PC Gamer US named Panzer General II the best computer wargame of 1997. It was a runner-up for Computer Gaming World's 1997 "Wargame Game of the Year" award, but ultimately lost to Sid Meier's Gettysburg! The editors called Panzer General II "a clinic in how to properly develop a sequel".

== Legacy ==
In 1998, PC Gamer US declared it the 15th-best computer game ever released, and the editors called it "the perfect introduction to wargaming".

=== Patches and modifications ===
There are only two official game patches released for Panzer General II, 1.01 and 1.02; they are available only for UK, US, German and French language versions (no patch was ever released for the Japanese version). Because the game in version 1.02 had many bugs left and severely limited the freedom of designing custom game data (scenarios, campaigns, maps and units), a number of unofficial patches were made. A fan-made 2.20 patch is available, and the GOG.com release of the game offers both v1.02 and v2.20 out of the box. Any further updates are unlikely, due to lack of activity from the unofficial patch maintainer and because of closed-sourceness of PGII.
