= Strategic Simulations =

Video game developer

Strategic Simulations, Inc.
- Type: Public
- Industry: Video games
- Founded: 1979; 47 years ago
- Founder: Joel Billings
- Defunct: 1994
- Fate: Merged into Mindscape
- Headquarters: Mountain View, California, US
- Products: Wargames; Role-playing games

Strategic Simulations, Inc. (SSI) was a video game developer and publisher of over 100 games from its founding in 1979 to its dissolution in 1994 (though the brand was in use until around 2002). The company focused on computer wargames then later added role-playing video games. SSI published the Panzer General series and the official video game adaptations of Dungeons & Dragons.

== History ==
The company was founded by Joel Billings, a wargame enthusiast, who in the summer of 1979 saw the possibility of using the new home computers such as the TRS-80 for wargames. While unsuccessfully approaching Avalon Hill and Automated Simulations to publish wargames, he hired programmers John Lyons, who wrote Computer Bismarck—later claimed to have been the first "serious wargame" published for a microcomputer—and Ed Williger, who wrote Computer Ambush. Both games were written in BASIC as were many of SSI's early games.

Although Billings expected that he and Lyon would write the first version of Computer Bismarck on a North Star computer, Apple Computer executive Trip Hawkins, who would later found Electronic Arts, persuaded Billings to switch to the Apple II because of its graphics. Computer Bismarck appeared for the Apple in January 1980 and for the TRS-80 later in the year. Chuck Kroegel, who joined the company as an employee in 1983, was the co-author with David Landrey of many of the early SSI wargames and led product development for over ten years.

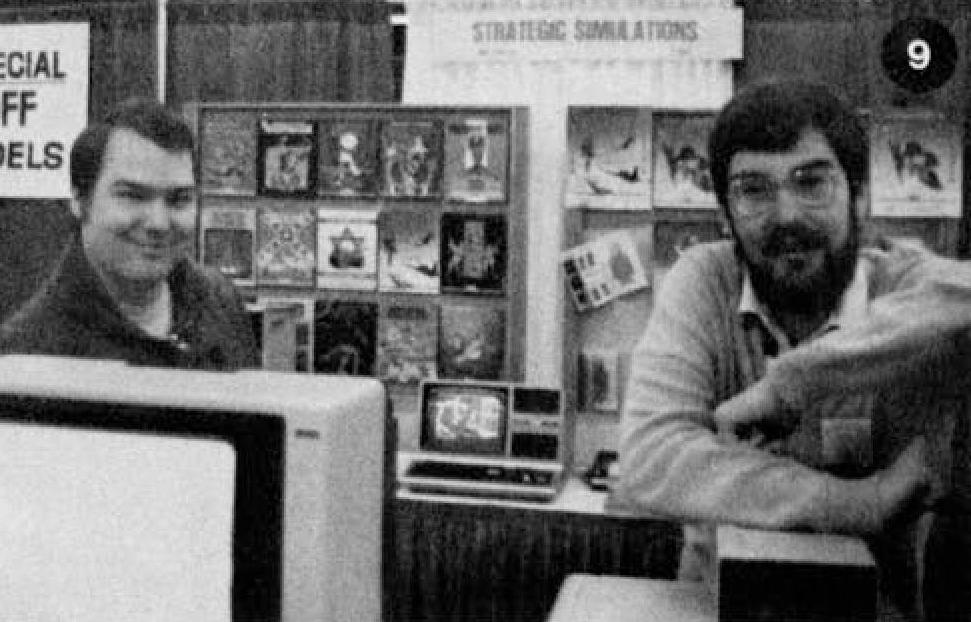
Strategic Simulations booth at the West Coast Computer Faire in 1982

By late 1980, SSI advertised that its games could "take you from Waterloo to the Super Bowl. (By way of the North Atlantic.)" In 1982 SSI launched its RapidFire line. Although the name implies action titles, it was in fact simply a branding of games being written by third party authors. The initial series consisted of Cytron Masters, The Cosmic Balance and Galactic Gladiators. Later titles included Epidemic!, a real time strategy title dealing with a global plague, Queen of Hearts, Cosmic Balance II, Broadsides and others. The branding effort did not last very long, and appeared to have been ended in either 1983 or 1984. Chris Smith reviewed SSI's RapidFire Line in The Space Gamer No. 59. Smith commented that " RapidFire is a game line that deserves any award it can be nominated for. It is the best line of computer games I've ever seen, and the programs rate high on an individual basis also."

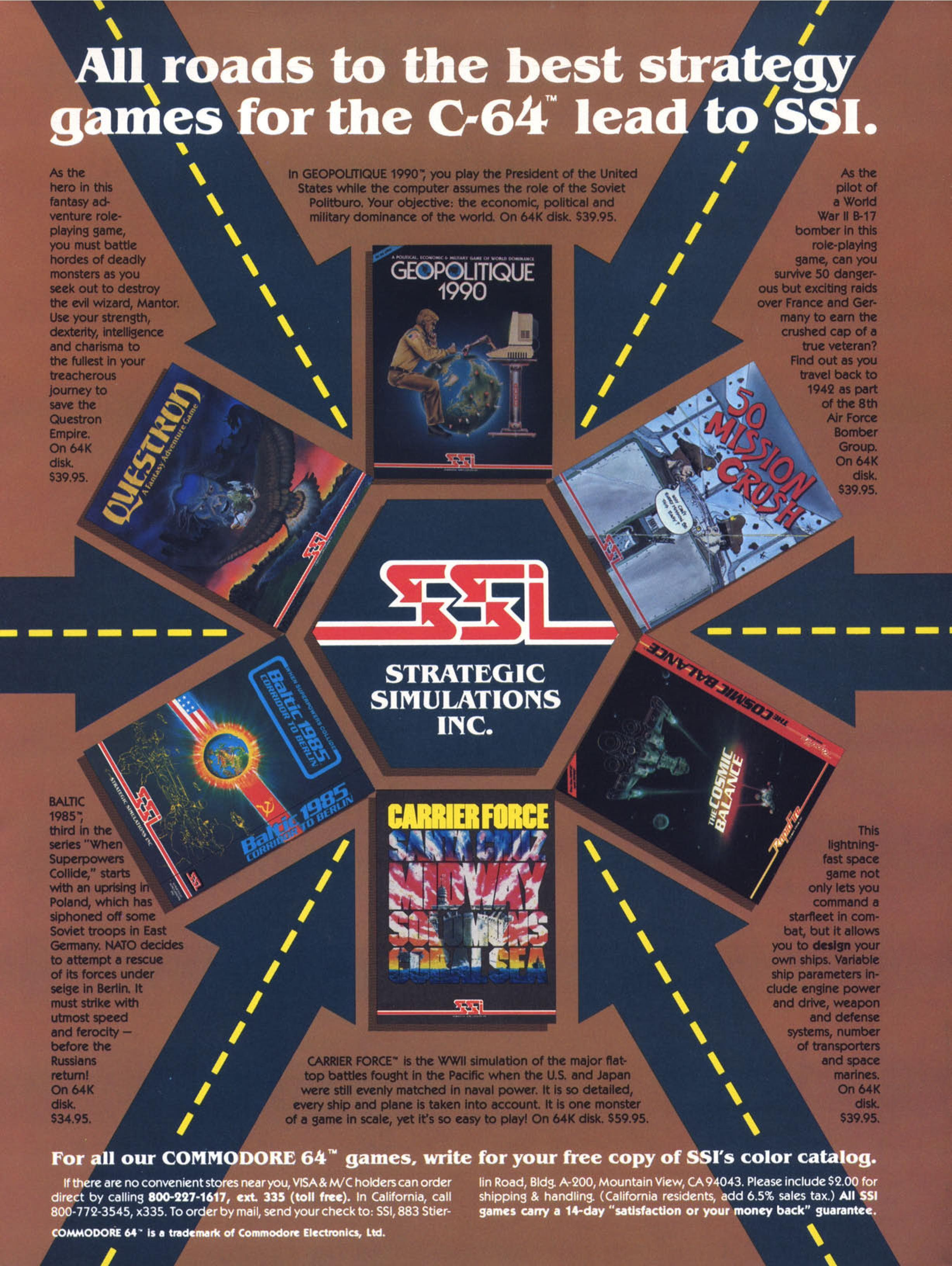
An SSI ad for Commodore 64 games, published in a 1984 issue of Computer Gaming World

By 1985, Antic wrote "serious computer wargamers consider [SSI] a company in a class by itself". It had 60 employees and had published 12 games in the previous year, most written in compiled BASIC. Developers such as Gary Grigsby received royalties of up to $20,000 per game. By fiscal 1987 the company had $5 million in sales, and had released 89 games in its first eight years.

SSI had expanded into role-playing games in 1984 with titles such as Wizard's Crown, Questron and the Phantasie series. In 1987, SSI acquired the Advanced Dungeons & Dragons (AD&D) license from TSR and subsequently published 30 titles in that series, starting with Pool of Radiance in 1988 and including War of the Lance in 1989 (Apple II) and 1990 (MS-DOS & Commodore 64). The TSR products formed the core of games released using the Gold Box engine.

By 1992, Computer Gaming World stated that SSI "is no longer known as, primarily, a wargame company [but] continues to publish its share of wargames". In 1994, the company released Panzer General. Panzer General was a very approachable and easy-to-play game that nevertheless had some gameplay depth and the sense of continuity and goals. It was followed by three other games based on slightly modified versions of the basic engine, including Allied General and Pacific General, the latter arguably being the most balanced. Non-historical games based on the same system were also released, Star General and Fantasy General. These were later referred to collectively as the 5-Star General Series.

As the newer versions were released over a three-year period they increasingly became outdated in terms of improving computer hardware. In 1997 it released a new version, Panzer General II, with hand-painted maps and icons. It was very popular, selling well over 100,000 copies in its first release, and is still modded and played today. People's General was based on the same engine. In 1999 Panzer General 3D Assault introduced a true 3D engine, but gameplay was not particularly notable. A final attempt in 2000 was Panzer General III: Scorched Earth.

SSI was acquired by Mindscape in 1994, spent some time as part of Mattel, and finally became part of Ubisoft in March 2001, which retired the brand a few years later.

In December 2013, Joel Billings donated several SSI video games (including the source code), such as Computer Bismarck, for preservation to the International Center for the History of Electronic Games.
