= List of Mac games =

This is a list of Mac games. It contains 2540 video games released for Classic Mac OS (1 through 9.2.2) and macOS (10 or higher).

== 0–9 ==
Title	Developer/publisher	Release date	Genre	License	Mac OS versions
0 A.D.	Wildfire Games	2010	Strategy	Freeware	10.12+
101 Bally Slots	Masque Publishing	2004	Gambling	Commercial	8.0–10.4
The 11th Hour	Trilobyte	1996	Adventure	Commercial	7.5
2K5	DoomHammer Software	1998	Fighting	Commercial	7.5
2weistein	Brainmonster Studios	2008	Educational/adventure	Commercial	10.3+
3 in Three	Cliff Johnson/Cinemaware	1989	Puzzle	Commercial/Freeware	
3-D Bridge Deluxe	Freeverse	2004	Pinball	Commercial	8.6–9.2/10.1–10.4
3-D Dinosaur Adventure	Knowledge Adventure	1995	Educational	Commercial	
3-D Ultra NASCAR Pinball	Sierra	1999	Pinball	Commercial	8–9
3-D Ultra Pinball	Sierra	1995	Pinball	Commercial	7–9
3-D Ultra Pinball: Creep Night	Sierra	1996	Pinball	Commercial	7–9
3-D Ultra Pinball: The Lost Continent	Sierra	1997	Pinball	Commercial	7–9
3-D Ultra Pinball: Power!	Sierra	2000	Pinball	Commercial	8–9
3-D Ultra Pinball: Thrillride	Sierra	2000	Pinball	Commercial	8.5.1–9.2.2
3D Mini Golf	Thomas Slordahl	2011	Sports	Commercial	10.6.6+
4-D Boxing	Distinctive Software	1991	Sports	Commercial	7–9
4x4 EVO	Gathering of Developers	2000	Racing	Commercial	8.6–9.2.2
4x4 EVO 2	Aspyr Media	2002	Racing	Commercial	9.1–9.2.2/10.1–10.5
4x4 Offroad Racing	Decane	2011	Racing	Commercial	10.6.6+
The 7th Guest	Trilobyte	1994	Adventure	Commercial	7.0+
8th Wonder of the World	(VP) Virtual Programming	2004	Strategy	Commercial	9–9.2.2/10.1–10.4
9: The Last Resort	Tribeca Interactive	1996	Adventure	Commercial	7.5
The 99 Effect	NPC Unlimited	2007	Strategy	Shareware	10.2+

== A ==
Title	Developer/publisher	Release date	Genre	License	Mac OS versions
A-10 Attack!	Parsoft Interactive	1995	Flight simulator	Commercial	7.5–9.2.2
A-10 Cuba!	Parsoft Interactive	1996	Flight simulator	Commercial	7.5–9.2.2
The A-Files	Gyldendal	1998	Adventure/Educational	Commercial	
A-Train	Maxis	1992	Simulation	Commercial	6.0.5+
Aargon Deluxe	Twilight Games	1999	Puzzle	Commercial	10.2
Abalone	Peter Tax	1997	Board game	Freeware	8.0–9.2.2
Abbalone 3D	Anomic Software	1996	Board game	Shareware	
The Abbey	Crimson Cow	2009	Adventure	Commercial	
Absolute Acey Deucey	GammonSoft	2008	Board game	Shareware	
Absolute Backgammon	GammonSoft	2010	Board game	Shareware	
Absolute Farkle	GammonSoft	2010	Board game	Shareware	
Absolute Shisen-Sho	Kitsune Software		Board game	Shareware	
Absolute Solitaire	Glenn Seemann	1996	Card game	Commercial	6.0.7–9.2.2
Absolute Stocks	Splinter Software	1998	Simulation	Commercial	7
Absolute Zero	Domark	1995	First-person shooter	Commercial	7
Abundante	10 Tons	2008	Puzzle	Commercial	
Abuse	Crack Dot Com	1996	Platform	Open source	7–10
Acropolis	GameHouse		Adventure	Digital download	10.2–10.6.8
Action-Strategy Baseball	Cary Torkelson	1992	Sports	Commercial	6–9.2.2
Active Lancer	Freeverse	2003	Action	Commercial	8.6–10
Activision Action Pack	Activision	1997	Compilation	Commercial	7–9
Activision Anthology Remix	Activision	2003	Compilation	Commercial	
Actua Soccer (VR Soccer)	Gremlin Interactive	1996	Sports	Commercial	7
Adore Puzzle	AdoreStudio	2011	Puzzle	Freeware	10.5+
Adore Puzzle 2	AdoreStudio	2011	Puzzle	Freeware	10.5+
Advanced Dungeons & Dragons: The Dark Queen of Krynn	Strategic Simulations/MacSoft	1992	RPG	Commercial	6.0.2–7.1
Advanced Dungeons & Dragons: Pool of Radiance	Strategic Simulations	1989	RPG	Commercial	6.0.2–7.1
Advanced Dungeons & Dragons: Pools of Darkness	Strategic Simulations	1992	RPG	Commercial	6.0.2–7.1
Advanced Dungeons & Dragons: Secret of the Silver Blades	Strategic Simulations	1991	RPG	Commercial	6.0.2–7.1
Adventure!	Epiboly Software	1988	Interactive fiction	Commercial	7.0–8
Adventure at the Chateau d’Or	Centurion Soft	2001	Adventure/RPG	Commercial	7.5–9.2.2
Adventure Chronicles					
Adventure Elf	Blockdot, Inc.	2003	Platform	Freeware	
AdventureMaker	Epiboly Software	1988	Editor	Commercial	1.0–7
Adventures in Odyssey: Treasure of the Incas	Digital Praise	2005	Adventure/RPG	Commercial	10.1–10.3
The Adventures of Rick Rocket	My Game Company	2008	Action	Commercial	10.4+
Adventures on Pirate Isle	Feline Entertainment	2003	Platform	Commercial	9–10
AdvertCity	VoxelStorm	2015	Tycoon game	Commercial	10.9+
Africa Trail	The Learning Company	1995	Simulator	Commercial	7.1–9.2.2
After Dark Games	Vivendi Universal	1998	Multiple games	Commercial	7.5–9.2.2
Afterlife	LucasArts	1996	God game	Commercial	7.1–9
Agatha Christie: Death on the Nile		2008	Adventure	Shareware	10.3.9+
Agatha Christie: Peril at End House		2008	Adventure	Shareware	10.4+
Age of Curling	Blackish	2011	Sports	Commercial	10.6.6+
Age of Empires	MacSoft	1997	Real-time strategy	Commercial	7.1–9.2.2
Age of Empires II: Gold Edition	MacSoft	1999	Real-time strategy	Commercial	8.6–9.2.2/10.1–10.5
Age of Empires III	MacSoft	2006	Real-time strategy	Commercial	10.3.9–10.7
Age of Empires III: The Asian Dynasties	MacSoft	2008	Real-time strategy	Commercial	10.3.9–10.7
Age of Empires III: The WarChiefs	MacSoft	2007	Real-time strategy	Commercial	10.3.9–10.7
Age of Japan					
Age of Mythology	MacSoft	2002	Real-time strategy	Commercial	10.2.6–10.7
Agean	Splinter Software	1998	Board game	Commercial	7–8
Agitate	Splinter Software	1998	Board game	Commercial	7
AGON (Ancient Games of Nations)	Viva Media	2003	Adventure	Commercial	
aGORA: Soul of the Oracle	Knowble Design	1998	Action RPG	Commercial	7.5.5–9
Air Assault					
Air Attack II	Jeff Miller	1988	Action	Commercial	6–9
Air Hockey	Christopher Cross	1987	Sports	Commercial	6–8
Air Raid					
Air Traffic Controller	Walter J. Biess	1992	Flight simulation	Commercial	6–7
Airborne!	Silicon Beach Software	1984	Action	Commercial	6
Airburst	Strange Flavour	2001	Action		
Airburst Extreme	Strange Flavour	2004	Action		
Airline Tycoon Deluxe	RuneSoft		Simulation	Digital download	
Airline Tycoon Deluxe	Spellbound Entertainment	2003	Simulation	Commercial	
Airport Mania: First Flight	Reflexive Entertainment	2008	Simulation	Commercial	
Aki Mahjong Solitaire	Ambrosia Software	2003	Board game	Shareware	10.3.9+
Akkadia					
Al Unser Jr. Arcade Racing	Kalisto	1995	Racing	Commercial	7–9
Alchemy	PopCap Games	2001	Puzzle	Commercial	
Aleph One	Bungie	2000	First-person shooter	Open source	
Algodoo	Algoryx	2009	Physics sandbox	Commercial	
Alice Greenfingers 2	Action Lab	2008	Strategy/Simulation		
Alida	Got Game Entertainment	2004	Adventure	Commercial	10.1–10.4
Alien 8	Ignacio Perez Gil	2008	Puzzle-platform	Freeware	10.4+
Alien Arcade	Robert Cavey	1995	Educational	Commercial	
Sid Meier's Alien Crossfire	Firaxis Games	2000	Turn-based strategy	Commercial	7.6–10.4
Alien Invaders	Linda Frasier	1997	Action	Commercial	7–9
Alien Shooter: Vengeance	Sigma Team	2009	Action RPG	Commercial	10.5+
Aliens versus Predator	MacPlay	1999	First-person shooter	Commercial	8.6–9.2.2/10.1–10.5
Aliens versus Predator 2	MacPlay	2001	First-person shooter	Commercial	10.2–10.4.11
Alley 19 Bowling	Masque	1995	Sports	Commercial	7–9
Allied General	Strategic Simulations	1995	Turn-based strategy	Commercial	7–8
Alone in the Dark	Infogrames	1994	Survival horror	Commercial	7–9
Alone in the Dark 2	Infogrames	1996	Survival horror	Commercial	7–9
Alone in the Dark 3	Infogrames	1996	Survival horror	Commercial	7–9
Sid Meier's Alpha Centauri	Aspyr Media	1999	Turn-based strategy	Commercial	7.6–9.x–OS 10–10.6.8
Sid Meier's Alpha Centauri/Alien Crossfire	Aspyr Media	2001	Turn-based strategy	Commercial	7.6–9.x–OS10–10.6.8
Alpha PinBall	Orwell Digital	2008	Pinball	Commercial	10.2.8+
AlphaBaby					
AlphaBonk Farm	Headbone Interactive	1996	Educational	Commercial	7+
Altair	INEPTEC	1995	Board game	Commercial	7–9
Alter Ego	Activision	1986	Simulation	Commercial	
Alternate Reality: The Arena	Paradise Programming	1988	RPG	Commercial	1.0–5
Alternate Reality: The City	DataSoft	1985	RPG	Commercial	1.0–5
Alternate Reality: The Dungeon	DataSoft	1987	RPG	Commercial	1.0–5
Altitude	Nimbly Games	2009	Action	Commercial	
AmandaStories	Amanda Goodenough	1991	Adventure	Commercial	7–9
Amazing	Steve Capps	1984	Puzzle	Commercial	1.0–7.0
The Amazing Brain Train	Grubby Games	2008	Educational	Commercial	10.2+
The Amazon Trail	MECC	1994	Educational	Commercial	
Amazon Trail II	MECC	1996	Educational	Commercial	
Amazon Trail 3rd Edition: Rainforest Adventures	The Learning Company	1999	Educational	Commercial	7.1–9.1
American Civil War	AGEOD	2011	Turn-based strategy	Commercial	10.5.8+
American History Lux	Sillysoft Games	2006	Strategy	Commercial	10.2–10.5
American McGee's Alice	Aspyr Media	2000	Action/fantasy	Commercial	8.6–9.2.2/10.1–10.5
America's Army	United States Army	2003	First-person shooter	Freeware	
America's Army: Operations	United States Army/UNIX developers		First-person shooter	Freeware	10.2–10.4
Amigos Number Puzzles					
Amju Pet Zoo					
Amju Super Cool Pool					
Amnesia: The Dark Descent	Frictional Games	2010	Survival horror	Commercial	10.5+
Amps	Paul A. Perkins	1987	Action	Commercial	6–8
The Ancient Art of War	Evryware	1985	Real-time strategy	Commercial	
Ancient Art of War at Sea	Brooderbund	1987	Real-time strategy	Commercial	6
Ancient Empires Lux	Sillysoft Games		Strategy	Digital download	10.3–10.5
Ancient Hearts & Spades	Toybox Games		Card game	Digital download	10.2–10.5
Ancient Secrets					
Ancient Spiders Solitaire	Toybox Games		Card game	Digital download	10.2–10.5
And Yet It Moves	Broken Rules	2009	Puzzle	Commercial	
ANDROID					
Androkids2					
Angel Devoid: Face of the Enemy	Mindscape	1996	Adventure/action	Commercial	7.0–9.1
Angel Egg	LittleWing	1996	Pinball	Shareware	7.5, 10.1+
Angry Birds	Rovio Mobile	2011	Puzzle	Digital download	10.6.6+
Angry Birds Rio	Rovio Mobile	2011	Puzzle	Digital download	10.6.6+
Animal Agents					
Animals Coloring Book					
Animals of Mass Destruction					
Animaniacs: Game Pack!	Funnybone Interactive	1997	Action/Adventure	Commercial	7.1+
Ankh	DECK13 Interactive	2006	Adventure	Commercial	10.3.9+
Ankh: Battle of the Gods	DECK13 Interactive	2009	Adventure	Commercial	10.5.7+
Ankh: Heart of Osiris	DECK13 Interactive	2007	Adventure	Commercial	10.3.9+
Annie's Millions					
Anomaly: Warzone Earth	11 Bit Studios	2011	Action/strategy	Commercial	10.6.3+
Another Day At Work: Wednesday	Epic Banana	2005	Adventure	Freeware	7.0
Another Fine Mess	Ray Dunakin	1997	Adventure	Shareware	6
Another Mine					
Another War	(VP) Virtual Programming	2003	Adventure/RPG	Commercial	8.6–9.2.2/10.1–10.4
Another World (Out of This World)	Eric Chahi	1991	Platform	Commercial	6.0.7+
Antiquadra	Grayson Myers	1995	Card game	Commercial	7
Ants Afire	Macromedia	1994	Action	Commercial	8
Apache Longbow	Digital Integration	1995	Flight simulator	Commercial	7.5
Apache Strike		1987			
Apeiron	Ambrosia Software	1995	Action	Commercial	7–10
Appolon					
Aqua Blooper Piper	Casady & Greene	1991	Puzzle	Commercial	7
Aqua Bubble 2	Realore Studios	2008	Puzzle	Commercial	10.4+
Aqua Mahjong					
AquaMan	Doug Diego	2002	Action	Freeware	10
Aquaria	Bit Blot	2008	Action-adventure	Commercial	10.6
Aquataxx					
Aquazone	9003 Inc.	1993	Simulation	Commercial	7–9
Aquazone Deluxe	Desktop Life	1993	Simulation	Commercial	6–9
Arcade & Puzzle Games	Masque Publishing		Action/board	Commercial	8.0–9.2.2/10.1–10.3.9
Arcade Typing Tutor					
Archibald's Adventures	Rake in Grass	2009	Action/Puzzle		
Ares	Ambrosia Software	2001	Strategy	Commercial	8.0–9.2.1
Argonaut					
Ariel's Story Studio	Disney Interactive	1997	Educational	Commercial	7.0+
Arkanoid	Taito	1988	Action	Commercial	6
Arkanoid Space Ball			Action		
Armado					
Armagetron Advanced	Armagetronad.net	2001	Action	Open source	
Armand and the Foppish Hat	Jeff Hanson	2008	Adventure	Freeware	
Arm Wrestling League					
Armor	Midnite Software	1991	Strategy	Commercial	7
Armor Alley	Information Access Technologies	1990	Action	Commercial	6–9
Around the World In 80 Days	Novotrade International	1994	Adventure	Commercial	6.0.7–8
Arthur: The Quest for Excalibur	Infocom	1989	Interactive fiction	Commercial	6
Arthur's Pet Chase	The Learning Company	2003	Educational	Commercial	8.6–9.2.2/10.1–10.2
Arthur's Reading Race	The Learning Company	1996	Educational	Commercial	
Arthur's Sand Castle Contest	The Learning Company	2003	Educational	Commercial	8.6–9.2.2/10.1–10.2
Artillery	Kirk Crawford	1989	Strategy	Commercial	6–7
Ashalii					
Ashes to Ashes...	Stanley A. Crane	1985	Action	Commercial	6
Ashley Jones: The Heart Of Egypt		2009	Puzzle		
Asphalt 6: Adrenaline	Gameloft	2011	Racing	Commercial	10.6.6+
Aspirin 2	Sebastian Brytting	1999	Action	Commercial	7–8
Assassin	Wahoo Software	1996	Strategy	Commercial	7–9.2.2
Assassin's Creed Brotherhood	Ubisoft	2011	Action/adventure	Commercial	10.5+
Assassin's Creed II	Ubisoft	2010	Action/adventure	Commercial	10.5+
Assassin's Creed Shadows	Ubisoft	2025	Action/adventure	Commercial	14.4+ (M1 or higher)
AssaultCube	Rabid Viper Productions	2006	First-person shooter	Open source	
Asshole	Yiminee Software		Card game	Shareware	7.1–9.2.2
Asterax	Arvandor Software	1994	Action	Shareware	7–9
Asteroids	MacSoft		Action	Commercial	8.0–9.2.2
Astro Chase 3D	First Star Software	1994	Action	Commercial	8
At the Carnival	Cliff Johnson	1989	Puzzle	Freeware	6–9
Atari Arcade Classics	MacSoft		Action	Commercial	10.1–10.4
Ataxx	Larry Kepko	1992	Board game	Commercial	6-8
Atlas: The Gift of Aramai	Digital Terra	2001	RPG	Commercial	7.5.5–9
Atomic Cannon					
Atomic Combat					
Atomic Worm					
Atomino		1994	Puzzle	Commercial	7
ATV Madness	XLab Technologies	2011	Racing	Commercial	10.6.6+
Autoduel	Origin Systems	1985	RPG	Commercial	7
Autumn's Treasures					
Avadon: The Black Fortress	Spiderweb Software	2011	RPG	Commercial	10.4+
Avalon 2029	Bill Corbett	1997	Action	Commercial	7–9
Avara	Ambrosia Software	1996	Action	Shareware	
Avenue Flo					
Avernum	Spiderweb Software	2000	RPG	Shareware	
Avernum 2	Spiderweb Software	2000	RPG	Shareware	
Avernum 3	Spiderweb Software	2002	RPG	Shareware	
Avernum 4	Spiderweb Software	2005	RPG	Shareware	
Avernum 5	Spiderweb Software	2007	RPG	Shareware	
Avernum 6	Spiderweb Software	2009	RPG	Shareware	
Avert Fate	Raimund Schmacher/Forest Johnson	2007	First-person shooter	Freeware	10.4+
Awesome Blackjack	Bryan Arntson	1994	Card game	Commercial	7
Awesome Craps	Bryan Arntson	1994	Board game	Commercial	7
Awesome Hangman					
Awesome Roulette	Bryan Arntson	1994	Board game	Commercial	7
Awesome Scibo	Bryan Arntson	1994	Board game	Commercial	7
Azada: Ancient Magic	Big Fish Studios	2008	Adventure	Commercial	
Azile	Trans-Tex Software	1996	Simulation	Commercial	6–9
Azkend	10tons Ltd	2010	Puzzle		

== B ==
Title	Developer/publisher	Release date	Genre	License	Mac OS versions
BabelBloX	illumineX, inc.	2009	Puzzle	Shareware	10.5+
Baby Blimp	Big Fish Games	2009	Puzzle	Shareware	10.4+
Baby Jones	Graffiti Games	2011	Puzzle	Commercial	10.6.6+
Babysitting Mania	Gogii Games	2008	Simulation	Commercial	
Backflip Madness	Gamesoul Studio	2019	Sports	Commercial	10.11+
Backflip Madness Demo	Gamesoul Studio	2020	Sports	Shareware	10.11+
Back to the Future: The Game - Episode 1	Telltale Games	2010	Adventure	Commercial	10.5+
Back to the Future: The Game - Episode 2	Telltale Games	2011	Adventure	Commercial	10.5+
Back to the Future: The Game - Episode 3	Telltale Games	2011	Adventure	Commercial	10.5+
Back to the Future: The Game - Episode 4	Telltale Games	2011	Adventure	Commercial	10.5+
Back to the Future: The Game - Episode 5	Telltale Games	2011	Adventure	Commercial	10.5+
Backyard Basketball	Humongous	1997	Sports	Commercial	7
Backyard Baseball 2001	Infogrames/Atari	2000	Sports	Commercial	7.5–7.6.1
Backyard Baseball 2003	Infogrames/Atari	2002	Sports	Commercial	8.0–9.2.2
Backyard Football 2002	Infogrames/Atari	2001	Sports	Commercial	7.0–9.2.2
Backyard Soccer 2001 Major League Soccer Edition	Infogrames/Atari	2000	Sports	Commercial	7.5–9.2.2
Backyard Soccer 2004	Infogrames/Atari	2003	Sports	Commercial	8.0–9.2.2
Bad Day on the Midway	Inscape	1995	First-person adventure	Commercial	
Bad Mojo	Pulse Entertainment	2004	Adventure	Commercial	7.0–9
Bailey's Book House	Edmark	1993	Educational	Commercial	
Balance of Power	Mindscape, Chris Crawford	1985, 1989	Simulation	Commercial	6.0–9
Balcassa					
Baldur's Gate	BioWare/Graphsim Entertainment	2000	RPG	Commercial	8.0–9.2.2
Baldur's Gate: Tales of the Sword Coast	BioWare/Graphsim Entertainment	2001	RPG	Commercial	8.0–9.2.2
Baldur's Gate II: Shadows of Amn	MacPlay	2001	RPG	Commercial	8.6–9.2.2/10.1–10.4
Baldur's Gate II: Throne of Bhaal	MacPlay	2001	RPG	Commercial	9–9.2.2/10.1–10.4
Ballyhoo	Infocom	1985	Interactive fiction	Commercial	6–9
Bang! Howdy	Three Rings Design	2006	Strategy	Freeware	
Barbie of Swan Lake	Vivendi Universal		Strategy	Commercial	9.0–9.2.2/10.1–10.2
Bard's Tale	Interplay Productions	1985	RPG	Commercial	6
Barkanoid II	(VP) Virtual Programming		Action	Commercial	10.2–10.4
Baron: The Real Estate Simulation	Blue Chip Software	1984	Business simulation		
Barrack	Ambrosia Software	1996	Action	Shareware	
Batman: Arkham Asylum	Feral Interactive	2011	Action/adventure	Commercial	
Batman: Arkham City - Game of the Year Edition	Feral Interactive	2012	Action/adventure	Commercial	
Batman: Justice Unbalanced	The Learning Company		Educational	Commercial	10.1–10.2
Batman: Toxic Chill	The Learning Company		Educational	Commercial	8.6–9.2.2/10.1–10.2
Battle Academy	Slitherine Software	2011	Turn-based strategy	Commercial	
Battle Academy 2: Eastern Front	Slitherine Software	2014	Turn-based strategy	Commercial	10.6+
Battle Bears -1 Mac	SkyVu Pictures	2011	Action	Commercial	10.6.6+
Battle Beast	7th Level	1995	Fighting	Commercial	7.1–9
Battle Chess	Interplay		Board game	Commercial	6–9
Battle for the Universe	Misty Software		Strategy	Commercial	8.0–9.2.2/10.1–10.4
The Battle for Wesnoth	The Battle for Wesnoth Development Team	2005	Turn-based strategy	Open source	10.4+
The Battle of Britain	Rene Vidmer/Deadly Games	1991	Battle	Commercial	7+
Battle Girl	Feral Interactive	1999	Retro arcade	Commercial	
Battle Snake	Game Training	2011	Action	Freeware	10.6.6+
Battle Squadron	Cope-Com	1990	Shoot-em up	Commercial	
Battle vs. Chess	Targem Games/Gaijin Entertainment	2011	Board game/action	Commercial	10.6+
Battle Worlds: Kronos	King Art Games/Crimson Cow/Nordic Games	2013	Turn-based strategy	Commercial	10.6+
BattleBrain					
Battlefield 1942	Aspyr Media	2004	First-person shooter	Commercial	10.2–10.6.8
Battlefield 1942 Deluxe Edition	Aspyr Media		First-person shooter	Commercial	10.2–10.6.8
Battlefield 1942: Secret Weapons of WWII	Aspyr Media	2004	First-person shooter	Commercial	10.2–10.6.8
Battlefield 2142	Electronic Arts	2007	First-person shooter	Commercial	10.4–10.7
Battlegrounds Gaming Engine	Battlegrounds Games	2011	Virtual tabletop software	Commercial	10.1–10.6
Battlegrounds: RPG Edition	Battlegrounds Games	2006	Virtual tabletop software	Commercial	10.1–10.6
Battlestations: Midway	Robosoft Technologies/Eidos Interactive/Feral Interactive	2008	Action/strategy	Commercial	10.4+
Battlestations: Pacific	Robosoft Technologies/Eidos Interactive/Feral Interactive	2010	Action/strategy	Commercial	10.5.8+
Be a King: Lost Lands	Rake in Grass	2009	Strategy	Shareware	
Beach Head 2000	MacSoft	2000	Action	Commercial	8.1–9.2.2
Beach Head 2002	MacSoft	2002	Action	Commercial	8.6–9.2.2, 10.1–10.3.9
BeamWars	Steve Crutchfield	1992	Action	Shareware	6–9
Beauty Salon					
Bedlam			Adventure		
BeeCells3D					
Beer Pong	Corey Ledin	2011	Sports	Commercial	10.6.6+
Bejeweled Deluxe	PopCap Games	2001	Puzzle	Commercial	10.2–10.4
Bejeweled 2 Deluxe	PopCap Games	2004	Puzzle	Commercial	10.2–10.6.8
Bert	Gottlieb	1982	Puzzle	Commercial	
Besmashed					
Best Kakuro					
Best of the Original Mac Games Volume 1	Freeverse		Action	Commercial	10.3–10.4.11
Betty’s Beer Bar	Mystery Studio		Action	Digital download	10.1–10.4.11
Between the Worlds					
Beyond Dark Castle	Silicon Beach Software	1987	Platform	Commercial	1–8
Beyond Divinity	Larian Studios	2004	RPG	Commercial	
Beyond the Red Line	FreeSpace Open	2007	Space simulator		
Beyond Zork	Infocom	1987	Interactive fiction/RPG	Commercial	1–8
BGBlitz					
Big Bang Board Games	Freeverse		Board games	Commercial	10.3–10.4
Big Bang Brain Games	Freeverse		Board games	Commercial	10.3–10.4
Big Island Blends					
Big Kahuna Reef	Reflexive Entertainment	2005	Puzzle	Commercial	10.2–10.4
Big Kahuna Words	Reflexive Entertainment	2005	Puzzle	Commercial	
Big World Bowling	Sealab Studios	2011	Sports	Commercial	10.6.6+
Billiards					
Billy Frontier					
Binary Solitaire					
Biofilm					
Bionic Heart	Tycoon games	2009	Visual novel	Commercial	
Bionicle	Feral Interactive	2004	Action-adventure	Commercial	10.2–10.6.8
BioShock	Robosoft Technologies/Feral Interactive	2007	First-person shooter	Commercial	
BioShock 2	Open Planet Software/Feral Interactive	2012	First-person shooter	Commercial	
BioShock Infinite	Irrational Games/2K Games	2013	First-person shooter	Commercial	
Birdie Shoot					
Bit.Trip Beat	Gaijin Games	2010	Action, music, post-retro	Commercial	
Bitfighter	Bitfighter Industries	2012	Shooter, multiplayer	Open source	10.2+ (?)
Black & White	Feral Interactive	2001	Action/simulation	Commercial	9.0–9.2.2/10.2–10.4
Black & White: Creature Isle	Feral Interactive	2002	Action/simulation	Commercial	9.0–9.2.2/10.2–10.4
Black & White Platinum Pack	Feral Interactive	2002	Action/simulation	Commercial	9.0–9.2.2/10.2–10.4
Black & White 2	Robosoft Technologies/Feral Interactive	2009	God game	Commercial	
Black Ink					
Blackthorne	Blizzard	1996	Platform	Commercial	
Blades of Avernum	Spiderweb Software	2004	RPG	Shareware	
Blades of Exile	Spiderweb Software	1997	RPG	Shareware	
BlastABall	Arb Studios	2011	Sports/physics	Commercial	10.6.6+
Blitzkrieg	(VP) Virtual Programming	2008	Strategy	Commercial	10.4+
BlockAde Blitz!					
Blockland	Eric Hartman	2004	MMORPG	Shareware	
BlockMan					
Blokt					
Blood & Magic	Tachyon Studios	1996	Real-time strategy	Commercial	
Blood Bath	Under World		Shooter	Commercial	OS 7.1 to 9.2.2
BloodRayne	Aspyr Media	2002	Action-adventure	Commercial	10.2–10.4.11
Blox Arcade	Danny Espinoza	1995	Puzzle	Shareware	7–9
Blue Ice	Art of Mind Productions	1995	Adventure	Commercial	
Blue's ABC Time Activities	Ubisoft	1998	Educational	Commercial	
Blue's Clues: Blues Takes You To School	MacSoft	2003	Educational	Commercial	10.1–10.4
Blue's Clues Kindergarten	Infogrames/Atari	2002	Educational	Commercial	8.6–9.2.2
Blue's Clues Preschool	Infogrames	2002	Educational	Commercial	
Blue's Reading Time Activities	Infogrames	2000	Educational	Commercial	7.5.3+
Bob the Builder: Can-Do Carnival	Brighter Minds Media, Inc./Compedia Software & Hardware Ltd.	2009	Educational		
Bob the Builder: Can-Do Zoo	Brighter Minds Media, Inc./gameLab	2008	Educational		
Bob Came In Pieces	Ludosity Interactive	2010	Puzzle/physics	Commercial	10.4.11+
Bob's Dream Lite					
Bolo	Stuart Cheshire	1987	Tactical Shooter	Shareware	6.0+
Bolt	Avalanche Software	2008	Adventure	Commercial	
BombDunk	Shoecake Games	2010	Puzzle	Shareware	10.3+
BombSquad	Eric Froemling	2011	Action		10.6.6+
Bone: Out from Boneville	Telltale Games	2006	Adventure	Commercial	10.3.9+
Bongo Boogie					
Bonkheads	1AM		Action	Commercial	
Bonnie's Bookstore	New Crayon Games	2005	Puzzle	Commercial	
Book of Legends					
The Book of Unwritten Tales	King Art	2012	Adventure	Commercial	
Bookworm Deluxe	PopCap Games	2003	Puzzle	Commercial	10.2–10.6.8
BOOM	Factor Software	1997	Action	Commercial	
Border Zone	Infocom	1987	Interactive fiction	Commercial	
Borderlands	Feral Interactive	2010	First-person shooter	Commercial	10.6.4+
Borderlands: Game of the Year Edition	Feral Interactive	2010	First-person shooter	Commercial	
Bouboum	Atelier 801	2013	Strategy	Commercial	
BoXiKoN					
Braid	Number None, Inc.	2009	Platform	Commercial	
Brainpipe					
Brass Hats					
Brataccas	Psygnosis	1986	Adventure	Commercial	
Brawlhalla	Blue Mammoth Games/Ubisoft	2017	Fighting	Freeware	10.7+
Bricks	Knowledge Adventure	1996	Puzzle/Simulation	Commercial	7.1+
Bricks of Egypt	Mac Joy	2005	Action		10-10.5
BrickShooter for Mac					
Bridge Baron					
Bridge Construction Set	Chronic Logic	2000	Puzzle	Shareware	
Briscola					
Broken Sword: The Shadow of the Templars	Revolution Software	1996	Adventure	Commercial	
Broken Sword: The Smoking Mirror (Remastered)	Revolution Software	2011	Adventure	Commercial	10.5.8+
Brothers in Arms: Double Time	Robosoft Technologies/Feral Interactive	2010	First-person shooter	Commercial	10.5.8+
Bubble Shooter	Absolutist Games	2004	Puzzle	Commercial	
Bubble Trouble	Ambrosia Software	1996	Action	Commercial	
BubbleTrap					
Bubsy 3D: Bubsy Visits the James Turrell Retrospective	Arcane Kids	2013	Platform	Freeware	
Bud Redhead					
Bug Attack	Webfoot Technologies	2011	Action	Commercial	10.6.6+
Bug Defender					
Bugdom	Pangea Software	1999	Action	Commercial	8.6–9.2.2
Bugdom 2	Pangea Software		Action	Commercial	9.0–9.2.2/10.3–10.5
Build-a-lot	HipSoft	2007	Simulation	Commercial	
Build in Time					
Buku Sudoku	Absolutist	2006	Puzzle	Commercial	
Bullet Candy	Charlie's Games	2006	Shooter		10
Bullet Candy Perfect					
Bumbler Bee-Luxe	Dadgum Games	1997	Shooter	Commercial	7.1-9.2
Bunker Run					
Bunny Killer 2	Jonathan Sweet	1993	Action	"Emailware"	7.x
Bunny Killer 3	Jonathan Sweet	1994	Action		7.x
Burdaloo					
Bureaucracy	Infocom	1987	Interactive fiction	Commercial	
Burger Shop	GoBit Games	2007	Action		
BurgerTime Deluxe					
Burn:Cycle	TripMedia	1994	Puzzle	Commercial	
Burn the Rope	Big Blue Bubble	2011	Puzzle	Commercial	10.6.6+
Burn Zombie Burn	DoubleSix	2011	Action	Commercial	10.6.6+
Burning Monkey Casino	Freeverse	2003	Action	Commercial	10.1–10.4.11
Burning Monkey Mahjong Solitaire	Freeverse	2003	Card game	Commercial	10.1–10.4.11
Burning Monkey Puzzle Lab	Freeverse	2000	Puzzle	Commercial	8.6–9.2.2/10.1–10.4.11
Burning Monkey Solitaire	Freeverse	1996	Card game		8.6–9.2.2/10.1–10.4.11
Burning Monkey Solitaire 4.0	Freeverse		Card game	puzzle	10.1–10.5.8
Burning Rubber	Jonas Echterhoff	1996	Vehicle combat	Freeware	7–9
Bus Driver	SCS Software	2011	Simulation	Commercial	10.6.6+
Bushfire					
BZFlag	bzflag.org	2002	Vehicle combat	Open source	10.2+

== C ==
Title	Developer/publisher	Release date	Genre	License	Mac OS versions
Caesar	Sierra	1993	City-building	Commercial	7.1
Caesar II	Sierra		City-building	Commercial	7.1–9.2.2
Caesar III	Sierra	1999	City-building	Commercial	7.6.1–9.2.2
Caillou: Ready for School	Brighter Minds	1999	City-building	Commercial	8.6–9.2.2/10.2–10.3
Cairo Shootout	Duane Blehm	1987	Action	Shareware	
Cake Mania	Sandlot Games	2006	Simulation	Commercial	
Cake Shop					
Call of Atlantis					
Call of Duty	Aspyr Media	2004	First-person shooter	Commercial	10.2–10.6.8
Call of Duty 2	Aspyr Media	2006	First-person shooter	Commercial	10.3.9–10.6.8
Call of Duty 4: Modern Warfare	Aspyr Media		First-person shooter	Commercial	10.5.4–10.8
Call of Duty: Black Ops	Aspyr Media		First-person shooter	Commercial	10.5.4–10.7
Call of Duty: Deluxe Edition	Aspyr Media		First-person shooter	Commercial	10.2–10.6.8
Call of Duty: United Offensive	Aspyr Media	2004	First-person shooter	Commercial	10.2–10.6.8
Campfire Legends – The Hookman	GameHouse Studios	2009	Adventure	Commercial	
Canal District	Louise "Lucy" Hope	1997	Adventure	Shareware	
Can You See What I See? Dream Machine					
Candy Land Adventure	Hasbro Interactive	1998	Educational	Commercial	7.0+
Cap'n Magneto	Al Evans	1985	Adventure	Shareware	
Captain Bumper	Casady & Greene	2001	Action	Commercial	8.6
Carambola					
Cardographer					
Cards, Mahjongg & Solitaire	Masque Publishing		Board games	Commercial	8.6–9.2.2/10.1–10.5.8
Caribbean Sea Fishes	Sky Horse Games	2010	Simulation	Commercial	10.4+
Carmageddon	Interplay	1997	Racing	Commercial	
Carmageddon II: Carpocalypse Now	Interplay	1998	Racing	Commercial	
Carmen Sandiego: Chase Through Time	The Learning Company		Educational	Commercial	7.1–7.6.1
Carrier Command	Realtime Games	1988	Simulation	Commercial	
Cars	Disney Interactive Studios	2006	Racing	Commercial	
Cars Mater-National Championship	THQ	2007	Racing	Commercial	
Cars: Radiator Springs Adventures	THQ	2006	Racing	Commercial	10.3–10.6.8
Cartoon Network Universe: FusionFall	Grigon Entertainment	2009	MMORPG	Free-to-play	
Casino Columns	Desmund Courtney	1992	Puzzle	Commercial	7.0 - 7.6 - 9
Casper Brainy Book	Knowledge Adventure	1995	Educational	Commercial	7.5+
Caster					
The Castle	Blue Line Studios	2007	Adventure	Commercial	10.3.9+
Castle Explorer	Dorling Kindersley Software		Simulation	Commercial	7.0–9.2.2
Castles: Siege and Conquest	MacPlay		Strategy	Commercial	7.0–9.2.2
Castles II: Siege and Conquest	Interplay		Strategy	Commercial	
Caveman Rocks	Webfoot Technologies	2011	Platform	Commercial	10.6.6+
Celtic Kings	(VP) Virtual Programming	2002	Strategy	Commercial	10.2–10.4.11
Centipede	MacSoft/Atari		Action	Commercial	8.0–9.2.2
Championship Manager 2006	(VP) Virtual Programming	2006	Simulation/sports	Commercial	10.3.9–10.4.11
Championship Manager 2007	(VP) Virtual Programming	2007	Simulation/sports	Commercial	10.3.9–10.5.8
Championship Manager 2008	(VP) Virtual Programming	2007	Simulation/sports	Commercial	10.3.9+
Championship Manager 2010	(VP) Virtual Programming	2009	Simulation/sports	Commercial	10.5.7+
Championship Manager 4	Feral Interactive	2003	Simulation/sports	Commercial	9.2.2, 10.2
Championship Manager: Season 00/01	Feral Interactive	2000	Simulation/sports	Commercial	8–9
Championship Manager: Season 01/02	Feral Interactive	2001	Simulation/sports	Commercial	8.6–9.2.2, 10.1
Championship Manager: Season 03/04	Feral Interactive	2003	Simulation/sports	Commercial	10.2–10.4.11
Championship Manager: Season 99/00	Feral Interactive	1999	Simulation/sports	Commercial	8–9
Chaos: A Fantasy Adventure Game	HarperCollins	1996	Adventure	Commercial	7.1–7.6.1
Charge!	Leander Harding	1993	Action	Commercial	7.0 - 7.6 - 9
Chessaria: The Tactical Adventure	Pixel Wizards	2018	Strategy	Commercial	10.8
Chessic					
The Chessmaster 2000	Software Toolworks	1986	Strategy	Commercial	1–7
The Chessmaster 3000	Software Toolworks	1994	Strategy	Commercial	7–9
The Chessmaster 4000	Mindscape	1996	Strategy	Commercial	7–9
Chessmaster 6000	Mindscape/Mattel Interactive	1998	Strategy	Commercial	7–9
Chessmaster 9000	Zonic Limited/Feral Interactive	2004	Strategy	Commercial	10.2–10.4.11
ChessWorks	Ekim Software	2001	Strategy	Commercial	8.0–9.2.2/10.1–10.5.8
Cheveree	GrassGames		Action		
Chicago 1930	Spellbound Entertainment	2003	RPG	Commercial	
Chicken Invaders 2: The Next Wave	InterAction Studios	2009	Action	Commercial	10.4+
Chicken Invaders 3: Revenge of the Yolk	InterAction Studios	2009	Action	Commercial	10.4+
Chicken Invaders 4: Ultimate Omelette	InterAction Studios	2010 Arcade	Commercial	10.4+	
Chicktionary					
Chinese Checkers					
ChipWits	BrainPower	1984	Simulation		
Chiral	Ambrosia Software		Puzzle	Commercial	
Chitarrella					
Chocolate Castle	Lexaloffle	2007	Puzzle	Commercial	
Chocolatier	Big Splash Games LLC	2007	Simulation	Commercial	
Chocolatier 2: Secret Ingredients					
Chocolatier: Decadence by Design	Big Fish Games/PlayFirst	2009	Simulation		
Chopper	Majic Jungle Software	2009	Scrolling shooter		
Christmas Crisis	Koingo Software	2012	Action		10.4
Christmas Swap					
Christmasville					
The Chronicles of Riddick: Assault on Dark Athena	(VP) Virtual Programming	2010	First-person shooter	Commercial	10.6.3+
Chuzzle	Raptisoft Games	2005	Puzzle	Commercial	
Cinderella - The Original Fairy Tale	Discis	1992	Educational	Commercial	
Circuit Defenders	Sector3 Games	2010	Action	Commercial	10.3.9+
Citadel: Adventure of the Crystal Keep	Postcraft International, Inc.	1989	RPG	Commercial	
Citadel of the Dead	Affiliate Venture publishing	1994	Role playing	Commercial	
Cities in Motion	Colossal Order	2011	Simulation	Commercial	10.6.3+
Citizen Sleeper	Jump Over the Age/Fellow Traveller	2022	Tactical role-playing game	Commercial	10.10.5+
City of Heroes	NCsoft	2004	MMORPG	Commercial	10.5+
City of Secrets	Aidem Media	2011	Adventure	Commercial	10.6.6+
City of Villains	Cryptic Studios	2005	MMORPG	Commercial	
Sid Meier's Civilization	MicroProse	1991	Turn-based strategy	Commercial	6.0.7-9.2.2
Sid Meier's Civilization II	MicroProse	1997	Turn-based strategy	Commercial	7.0-9
Sid Meier's Civilization III	MicroProse/MacSoft	2001	Turn-based strategy	Commercial	8.6.-10.4
Sid Meier's Civilization IV	Firaxis Games/Aspyr	2006	Turn-based strategy	Commercial	10.3.9+
Sid Meier's Civilization V	Firaxis Games/Aspyr	2010	Turn-based strategy	Commercial	10.6.4+
Sid Meier's Civilization VI	Firaxis Games/2K Games	2016	Turn-based strategy	Commercial	10.11.6+
Sid Meier's Civilization VII	Firaxis Games/2K Games	2025	Turn-based strategy	Commercial	15.0+ (M1+)
Civilization: Call to Power	Activision	1999	Turn-based strategy	Commercial	7.6 or later
Sid Meier's Civilization: Beyond Earth	Firaxis Games/Aspyr	2014	Turn-based strategy	Commercial	10.10+
Sid Meier's Civilization IV: Colonization	Firaxis Games/Aspyr	2009	Turn-based strategy	Commercial	10.3.9+
Sid Meier's Starships	Firaxis Games/2K Games	2015	Turn-based strategy	Commercial	10.9+
Clan Lord	Delta Tao Software	1998	MMORPG	Commercial	7.5–10.13
Clandestiny	GRL Games	2011	Adventure	Commercial	10.6+
Classic Mahjong Solitaire					
Classic Solitaire					
Cleopatra: a Queen's Destiny	Kheops Studio	2009	Adventure	Commercial	10.5+
Clive Barker's Undying	Aspyr Media	2002	First-person shooter	Commercial	9.0–9.2.2/10.1–10.4.11
ClockWerx	Callisto Corporation	1995	Puzzle	Commercial	
Clonk Rage	RedWolf Design	2007	Action	Shareware	10.0+
Close Combat	Microsoft		Real-time tactics	Commercial	7.5–9.2.2
Close Combat: A Bridge Too Far	Microsoft		Real-time tactics	Commercial	7.5–9.2.2
Close Combat: First to Fight	MacSoft		First-person shooter	Commercial	10.2–10.7
Clubhouse Mini-Golf					
CLUE Accusations and Alibis					
CLUE Classic	GamesCafe.com	2008	Board game	Commercial	10.3.9+
Cluefinders: The Incredible Toy Store Adventures	The Learning Company	2001	Educational	Commercial	8.6–9.2.2/10.1–10.3.9
Clueless					
The Clumsys	Banzai Interactive	2008	Hidden object	Commercial	10.3.9+
CoachStat Baseball					
Cocoto Kart Online	Neko Entertainment	2011	Racing	Commercial	10.6.6+
CODE					
Cogs	Lazy 8 Studios	2011	Puzzle	Commercial	10.6.6+
Cold War	MindWare Studios	2005	Stealth	Commercial	
Colibricks					
Colin McRae Rally Mac	Feral Interactive	2007	Racing	Commercial	10.4+
Collapse	GameHouse	1999	Puzzle	Commercial	
The Colony	David Alan Smith	1988	First-person shooter	Commercial	
Color Pavilion	Louise "Lucy" Hope	2000	Adventure	Shareware	
Color Sudoku					
ColorRise					
Colossal Cave Adventure	William Crowther	1976	Interactive fiction	Freeware	
Comanche Mac	Novalogic	1995	Simulation	Commercial	7+
Command & Conquer	Westwood Studios	1995	Real-time strategy	Freeware	
Command & Conquer: Generals	Aspyr Media		Real-time strategy	Commercial	10.2–10.7.1
Command & Conquer: Generals – Deluxe	Aspyr Media		Real-time strategy	Commercial	10.2–10.7.1
Command & Conquer: Red Alert 3	Electronic Arts	2009	Real-time strategy	Commercial	
Command & Conquer 3: Tiberium Wars	Electronic Arts		Real-time strategy	Commercial	10.4+
Commander – Europe at War	Freeverse	2007	Turn-based strategy	Commercial	10.3+
Commander: Napoleon at War	Firepower Entertainment/Slitherine Software	2009	Turn-based strategy	Commercial	10.4+
Commandos: Battle Pack DVD-Rom	Feral Interactive	2005	Real-time tactics	Commercial	10.2–10.4.11
Commandos 2: Men of Courage	Feral Interactive	2005	Real-time tactics	Commercial	10.2–10.4.11
Commandos 3: Destination Berlin	Feral Interactive	2005	Real-time tactics	Commercial	10.2–10.4.11
Confusion					
The Conjurer	GameHouse	2009	Hidden object	Commercial	10.5+
Conquest of the New World	MacPlay	1996	Strategy	Commercial	7.5.1
Constellation					
Continental Cafe					
Control: Ultimate Edition	Remedy Entertainment	2025	Action-adventure	Commercial	14.0+ (M1+)
Cooking Academy					
Cookie's Bustle	Rodik	1999	Adventure	Commercial	
Cooking Dash					
Cooking Dash: DinerTown Studios					
Cooking Quest 1.0 Cooking Quest					
CornerChaos					
Corruption	Magnetic Scrolls	1988	Interactive fiction	Commercial	
Cortex Command	Data Realms LLC	2008	Action	Shareware	10.3.9+
Cosmic Encounter Online	Peter Olotka	2003	Board game		
Cosmic Osmo	Cyan Worlds	1989	Adventure	Commercial	6-9.2
Costume Chaos					
The Count of Monte Cristo	HiddenObjects	2008	Hidden object	Commercial	10.3.9+
Counter-Strike: Source	Valve	2010	First-person shooter	Commercial	
Counter-Strike: Global Offensive	Valve	2012	First-person shooter	Freeware	10.11+
County Fair					
Coyote's Tale: Fire & Water	Merscom LLC	2009	Adventure	Shareware	10.4.11+
Cradle Of Persia	Awem Studio	2007	Puzzle	Commercial	10.5 (Leopard)+
Cradle Of Rome	Awem Studio	2007	Puzzle	Commercial	
Crasher	Punchers Impact	2011	Vehicle combat	Commercial	10.6.3+
Crazy Eggs	Xpowergames				
Crazy Cars	Titus Interactive	1988	Racing/Driving		
Crazy Machines: Inventor's Workshop	FAKT Software	2011	Puzzle	Commercial	10.6.6+
Crazy Machines: New Challenges	FAKT Software	2011	Puzzle	Commercial	10.6.6+
Crazy Machines: The Wacky Contraptions Game	Viva Media	2005	Puzzle	Commercial	10.3–10.4.11
Crazy Money					
Create A Mall					
Creatures Exodus	Kutoka Interactive, Inc.		Life simulation	Commercial	10.2–10.4.11
Creatures Village	Kutoka Interactive, Inc.		Life simulation	Commercial	10.2–10.4.11
CreaVures	Muse Games	2011	Platform	Commercial	10.5.8+
Creeper World	Knuckle Cracker	2009	Tower-defense		
Creepy Mines	DanLab Games	2002	Action	Shareware	9, 10.1–10.3
Creepy Mines 2	DanLab Games	2003	Action	Shareware	10.2+
Cribbage	Yiminee Software		Board game	Digital download	8.0–9.2.2/10.1–10.6.8
Crimson Fields			Turn-based tactics	Open source	
Cro-Mag Rally	Aspyr Media	1998	Racing	Commercial	8.6–9.2.2/10.1–10.2
Croker					
Crosscountry Canada 2	Ingenuity Works	2002	Educational	Commercial	
Crossworders' Dictionary and Gazetteer					
Crumb					
Crusader Kings	(VP) Virtual Programming		Strategy	Commercial	10.2+
Crusader Kings: Deus Vult	(VP) Virtual Programming		Strategy	Commercial	10.3.9+
Cryptogram	Leslie Thomas	1989	Puzzle	Commercial	7.0 - 7.6 - 9
Crystal Caliburn	LittleWing	1993	Pinball	Shareware	7.1, 10.1+
Crystal Cave Classic					
Crystal Crazy	Casady & Greene	1990s	Action	Commercial	
Crystal Quest	Casady & Greene	1987	Action	Commercial	
CrystalBall Lite					
CSI: Crime Scene Investigation	Aspyr Media	2004	Adventure	Commercial	10.2–10.4.11
CSI: Hard Evidence					
Cuba Letra					
CubeRise					
Cubes					
Curse of Dragor	Domark Software LTD		RPG	Commercial	7.1–7.6.1
Curse of the Pharaoh: Napoleon's Secret					
Curse of the Pharaoh: The Quest for Nefertiti	Ph03nix New Media	2008	Adventure	Commercial	
Cute Knight Deluxe	Hanako Games	2007	Life Simulation	Commercial	
Cutout Heroes: Making of a Ninja					
Cythera	Ambrosia Software	1999	RPG	Commercial	7.x-9.2.2

== D ==
Title	Developer/publisher	Release date	Genre	License	Mac OS versions
The D Show	Disney Interactive	1998	Family/Kids	Commercial	
Dairy Dash	PlayFirst	2008	Strategy		10.4
DaisyWords	Shoecake Games	2005	Puzzle		8.6-10.14
Daleks					
Dam Beavers					
Damage Incorporated	Paranoid Productions	1997	First-person shooter	Commercial	
Damejong					
Danger Next Door					
Dangerous High School Girls in Trouble!	Mousechief	2008	Puzzle	Commercial	
Darby the Dragon	Broderbund	1996	Adventure	Commercial	7.0-7.6
Dark Castle	Silicon Beach Software	1986	Platform	Commercial	
Dark Colony	Strategic Simulations	1997	Real-time strategy	Commercial	
Dark Horizons: Lore Invasion	Max Gaming Technologies	2005	Simulation	Freeware	
Dark Seed	Cyberdreams	1992	Adventure	Commercial	
Dark Vengeance	Reality Bytes	1998	Action	Commercial	7–9
Darkest of Days	8monkey Labs	2010	First-person shooter	Commercial	10.6.5+
Darkside of Xeen			RPG		
Darwinia	Introversion Software	2005	Real-time strategy	Commercial	
Darwin's Dilemma	Inline Design	1990	Puzzle	Commercial	
David's Backgammon	David Byrum	1997	Board Game		8-9
A Day At Work	Epic Banana	1999	Adventure	Freeware	7.0
Day of Defeat: Source	Valve	2010	First-person shooter	Commercial	10.6.3+
Day of the Tentacle	LucasArts	1993	Adventure	Commercial	
DD Poker					
The Daedalus Encounter	Virgin Interactive	1995	Adventure/puzzle	Commercial	
Dead in Vinland	CCCP/Dear Villagers	2018	Survival	Commercial	10.6+
Deadline	Infocom	1982	Interactive fiction	Commercial	
Dead Maze	Atelier 801	2018	Massively multiplayer online, survival	Commercial	
Deathground	Freeverse	1999			
DeathSpank	Hothead Games	2010	Action RPG	Commercial	10.5.8+
DeathSpank: Thongs of Virtue	Hothead Games	2010	Action RPG	Commercial	10.5.8+
Death Stranding	Kojima Productions	2024	Action	Commercial	13.3+ (M1+)
Deep Blue Sea					
Deep Voyage					
DeepTrouble					
DEFCON	Introversion Software	2007	Real-time strategy	Commercial	
Defenders of Law					
Defense Grid: The Awakening	Hidden Path Entertainment	2010	Action	Commercial	10.5.8+
Deimos Rising	Ambrosia Software	2001	Top-down shooter	Commercial	
Deja Vu: a Nightmare Comes True	ICOM Simulations, Inc.	1985	Adventure	Commercial	
Deja Vu II: Lost in Las Vegas	ICOM Simulations, Inc.	1988	Adventure	Commercial	
Deliantra			MMORPG	Open source	
Deathground	Freeverse Inc	1999			
Delicious 2 Deluxe	Zylom Studios	2007	Time management	Commercial	
Delicious: Emily's Taste of Fame	Zylom Studios	2008	Time management	Commercial	
Delicious: Emily's Tea Garden	Zylom Studios	2009	Time management	Commercial	
Deliverance	Hewson Consultants	1993	Platform	Commercial	7–9
Delta Force: Black Hawk Down	Aspyr Media	2005 for Mac	First-person shooter	Commercial	OS 10.4.11–10.6.8
Deluxe PocMon	Edgar M. Vidgal	2007	Action		10.3-10.14
Delver	Priority Interrupt	2018	Roguelike	Commercial	10.5–10.6
Democracy	Positech Games	2005	Simulation	Commercial	
Democracy 2	Positech Games	2007	Simulation	Commercial	
Demolition Company	GIANTS Software	2010	Simulation	Commercial	10.5.8+
Depths of Peril	Soldak Entertainment	2008	RPG	Commercial	
Descent	MacPlay	1995	First-person shooter	Commercial	
Descent II	MacPlay	1996	First-person shooter	Commercial	
Descent 3	Graphic Simulations	1999	First-person shooter	Commercial	
Desk Fighter	Nicholas-Louis Dozois, MagicTouch	1995	Fighting	Commercial	7.0 - 7.6 - 9
Destination: Treasure Island	Kheops Studio	2009	Adventure	Commercial	10.5+
Deus Ex	Ion Storm Inc.	2000	RPG	Commercial	
Deus Ex: Human Revolution - Director's Cut	Feral Interactive	2014	RPG	Commercial	
Deus Ex: Human Revolution - Ultimate Edition	Feral Interactive	2012	RPG	Commercial	
Deus Ex: Mankind Divided	Feral Interactive	2017	RPG	Commercial	
Devet	Jordan Tuzsuzov	2002	Puzzle	Commercial	
Diablo	Blizzard	1998	RPG	Commercial	
Diablo II	Blizzard	2000	RPG	Commercial	9
Diablo II: Lord of Destruction	Blizzard	2001	RPG	Commercial	9
Diablo III	Blizzard	2012	RPG	Commercial	
Diabolical Digits	Créalude	1995	Puzzle	Commercial	
Diamonds	Varcon Systems, Inc.	1992	Puzzle	Commercial	
Diaper Dash					
Diego Dinosaur Rescue					
The Dig	LucasArts	1995	Adventure	Commercial	
Dimenxian					
Diner Dash 2: Restaurant Rescue	Brighter Minds	2006	Time management	Commercial	
Diner Dash: Flo Through Time	PlayFirst	2007	Time management	Commercial	
Diner Dash: Hometown Hero	PlayFirst	2007	Time management	Commercial	
Diner Dash Seasonal Snack Pack			Time management	Commercial	
DinerTown Detective Agency					
DinerTown Tycoon					
Dinopark Tycoon					
Dirk Dashing: Secret Agent!					
DiRT 2	Feral Interactive	2011	Motor racing	Commercial	
DiRT 3	Feral Interactive	2015	Motor racing	Commercial	
Dirt Bike 2	Brad Quick	1995	Racing	Shareware	6–9
Dirt Bike 3	Brad Quick	1995	Racing	Shareware	7–9
Dirt Bike 3D	Brad Quick	1999	Racing	Shareware	8–9, 10.1
Dirt Bike 4	Brad Quick	1998	Racing	Shareware	7–9
Disney's Toontown Online	Walt Disney Internet Group	2003	MMORPG	Commercial	
Doc Clock: The Toasted Sandwich of Time	Stickmen Studios	2011	Puzzle	Commercial	
Doctor Who: Blood of the Cybermen	Sumo Digital	2010	Adventure	Commercial	10.5+
Doctor Who: City of the Daleks	Sumo Digital	2010	Adventure	Commercial	10.5+
Doctor Who: Shadows of the Vashta Nerada	Sumo Digital	2010	Adventure	Commercial	10.5+
Doctor Who: TARDIS	Sumo Digital	2010	Adventure	Commercial	10.5+
Dodge That Anvil!					
Dofus	Ankama Games	2005	MMORPG	Commercial	
Doggie Dash					
Doki Doki Literature Club!	Team Salvato	2017	Visual Novel	Freeware	10.9+
Dominions II: The Ascension Wars	Illwinter Game Design	2003	Turn-based strategy	Commercial	
Dominions 3: The Awakening	Illwinter Game Design	2006	Turn-based strategy	Commercial	
Domino					
Don't Quit Your Day Job	Philips Interactive Media	1996	Adventure	Commercial	
Doom	id Software	1994	First-person shooter	Commercial	7.6.1–9.2.2, 10.x
Doom II: Hell on Earth	id Software	1995	First-person shooter	Commercial	7.6.1–9.2.2, 10.x
Doom 3	Aspyr Media/id Software	2005	First-person shooter	Commercial	10.4.11–10.8.x
DotBot					
Double Trouble	Louise "Lucy" Hope	1997	Adventure	Shareware	
Doulber Gold	Phelios Inc				
Downfall					
DQ Tycoon					
Dr. Blob's Organism	Digital Eel/Cheapass Games	2003	Fixed shooter	Freeware	10.1+
Dr. Daisy Pet Vet	PlayFirst	2007	Action		10.4
Dr. Lynch Grave Secrets					
Dracula 3 - The Path of the Dragon	Kheops Studio	2010	Adventure	Commercial	10.4+
Dracula Unleashed	ICOM Simulations	1993	Adventure	Commercial	6.0.7
Dragon Age II	Electronic Arts	2011	RPG	Commercial	10.6.6+
Dragon Age: Origins	BioWare	2009	RPG	Commercial	10.6.2+
Dragon Age: Origins - Awakening	BioWare	2010	RPG	Commercial	10.6.2+
Dragon Dollars					
Dragon Portals					
Dragon's Lair (1994)	ReadySoft	1994	Action	Commercial	7.5
Dragon's Lair (2002)	Advanced Microcomputer Systems	2002	Action	Commercial	10.1
Dream Chamber	DarkWave Games	2013	Adventure	Commercial	10.5.8
Dream Chronicles	KatGames	2007	Adventure	Commercial	
Dream Chronicles: The Chosen Child	KatGames	2009	Adventure	Commercial	
Dream Day First Home					
Dream Day Honeymoon					
Dream Day Wedding					
Dream Day Wedding: Married in Manhattan					
Dream Pinball 3D	A.S.K. Homework	2008	Pinball	Commercial	10.4.11+
Dredge	Black Salt Games/Team17	2025		Commercial	10.13+
Dress Shop Hop					
Dress Up Rush					
Drift Mania Championship	Ratrod Studio	2011	Racing	Commercial	10.6.6+
Driver	Reflections Interactive/Infogrames	2000	Action	Commercial	8.6+
DROD: The City Beneath	Caravel Games	2007	Puzzle	Commercial	OS X
Drop Point: Alaska	Bongfish Interactive Entertainment	2007	Sports	Commercial	
drops!					
DropTeam					
DuckFighterI					
Duke Nukem 3D	MacPlay	1996	First-person shooter	Commercial	
Duke Nukem Forever	Aspyr Media	2011	First-person shooter	Commercial	
Dungeon Master II: The Legend of Skullkeep	MacPlay	1993	RPG	Commercial	
The Dungeon Revealed	John Raymonds	1987	RPG	Shareware	
Dungeon Siege	MacSoft	2002	RPG	Commercial	
Dwarf Fortress	Bay 12 Games	2006	Simulation	Freeware	
Dylo's Adventure					

== E ==
Title	Developer/publisher	Release date	Genre	License	Mac OS versions
Earl Weaver Baseball	Electronic Arts	1988	Sports	Commercial	
Earth 2140	Reality Pump	1997	Turn-based strategy	Commercial	
Easy Sudoku			Puzzle		
Eco-Match					
EcoRescue: Project Rainforest					
EdRacing					
EduPool					
Eets	Klei Entertainment	2010	Puzzle	Commercial	
Egglomania					
Egyptian Dreams 4 Slots					
Eight Ball Deluxe	LittleWing	1992	Pinball	Commercial	6.0.4–9.2.2
El Ballo	Ambrosia Software	2005	Platform	Commercial	
Electropy					
ElimiNation					
Elite Darts	Patch	1998	Simulation	Commercial	7.0+
Elizabeth Find MD: Diagnosis Mystery					
Emberwind	TimeTrap	2009	Platform	Commercial	10.4+
Emerald City Confidential	Wadjet Eye Games	2009	Adventure	Commercial	
Emily Wants to Play	Shawn Hitchcock/SKH Apps	2015	Survival horror	Commercial	
EmoMemory					
Empire: Total War - Gold Edition	Feral Interactive	2012	Real-time strategy	Commercial	
Empire: Wargame of the Century	Walter Bright	1987	Strategy	Commercial	
Enchanted Forest					
Enchanted Scepters	Silicon Beach Software	1984	Adventure	Commercial	
Enemy Engaged: RAH-66 Comanche vs. KA-52 Hokum	Razorworks/Feral Interactive	2000	Flight simulator	Open source	
Enemy Territory: Quake Wars	Splash Damage	2008	First-person shooter	Commercial	
Enigma	Andrew Sega	2007	Puzzle	Open source	
Enigmo	MacPlay(Orig)/Pangea Software	2003	Puzzle	Commercial	
Enigmo 2	Pangea Software	2006	Puzzle	Commercial	
Escape	Malcolm Evans	1982	Action	Commercial	
Escape from Monkey Island	LucasArts	2001	Adventure	Commercial	9, 10.1
Escape From Paradise					
Escape From Paradise 2: A Kingdom's Quest					
Escape The Museum					
Escape Rosecliff Island					
Escape Velocity	Ambrosia Software	1996	Space Simulation	Commercial	
Escape Velocity Nova	Ambrosia Software	2002	Space Simulation	Commercial	
Escape Velocity Override	Ambrosia Software	2000	Space Simulation	Commercial	
Eschalon: Book I	Basilisk Games	2007	RPG	Commercial	
Etch A Sketch					
Ethno Stones of RAR					
Europa Universalis II	Paradox Interactive/Virtual Programming	2003	Strategy	Commercial	9, 10.1+
Europa Universalis III	Paradox Interactive/Virtual Programming	2007	Strategy	Commercial	10.3.9+
Europa Universalis III: Divine Wind	Paradox Interactive/Virtual Programming	2011	Strategy	Commercial	10.6+
Europa Universalis III: Heir to the Throne	Paradox Interactive/Virtual Programming	2010	Strategy	Commercial	10.5.8+
Europa Universalis III: In Nomine	Paradox Interactive/Virtual Programming	2008	Strategy	Commercial	10.3.9+
Europa Universalis III: Napoleon's Ambition	Paradox Interactive/Virtual Programming	2007	Strategy	Commercial	10.3.9+
Europa Universalis: Rome	Paradox Interactive/Virtual Programming	2008	Strategy	Commercial	10.3.9+
Europa Universalis: Rome – Vae Victis	Paradox Interactive/Virtual Programming	2009	Strategy	Commercial	10.3.9+
Eve Online	CCP Games	2003	MMORPG	Commercial	
The Even More Incredible Machine	Jeff Tunnell Productions	1993	Puzzle/physics	Commercial	6–9
EverQuest	Sony Online Entertainment	1999	MMORPG	Commercial	
Everything Nice					
Excalibur: Morgana's Revenge	Richard Busey	2007	First-person shooter	Open source	
Exile: Escape From The Pit	Spiderweb Software	1995	RPG	Commercial	
Exile II: Crystal Souls	Spiderweb Software	1995	RPG	Commercial	
Exile III: Ruined World	Spiderweb Software	1996	RPG	Commercial	
Exolon DX	Graham Goring	2005	Platform	Freeware	10.2
Expeditions: Conquistador	Logic Artists/BitComposer	2013	RPG	Commercial	
Extreme Formula	GOGN Entertainment	2011	Racing	Commercial	10.6.6+
ExtremeTuxRacer					

== F ==
Title	Developer/publisher	Release date	Genre	License	Mac OS versions
F/A-18 Hornet	Graphsim Entertainment	1993	Flight simulator	Commercial	7.1
F/A-18 Hornet 2.0	Graphsim Entertainment	1995	Flight simulator	Commercial	7.5
F/A-18 Hornet 3.0	Graphsim Entertainment	1997	Flight simulator	Commercial	7.6
F/A-18 Korea	Graphsim Entertainment	1998	Flight simulator	Commercial	8.1
F/A-18 Operation Iraqi Freedom	Graphsim Entertainment	2004	Flight simulator	Commercial	10.2
F1 2012	Feral Interactive	2012	Motor racing	Commercial	
F1 2013	Feral Interactive	2014	Motor racing	Commercial	
F1 Championship Season 2000	Zonic Limited/Feral Interactive	2002	Motor racing	Commercial	
F-117A Stealth Fighter 2.0	MicroProse Software	1994	Flight simulator	Commercial	6.0.7–7
F40 Pursuit Simulator	Titus France SA	1990	Racing/Driving		
Fable: The Lost Chapters	Robosoft Technologies/Feral Interactive	2008	Action RPG	Commercial	
Factory: The Industrial Devolution	7 O'Clock Software (Patrick Calahan)/SoftStream International	1993	Puzzle/Simulation	Shareware	7.x
Fairway Solitaire	Big Fish Studios	2007	Card game		
A Fairy Tale	Reflexive Entertainment	2009	Puzzle	Commercial	10.4
Fairy Tower	LittleWing	2007	Pinball	Shareware	10.3.9+
Fairy Treasure					
Fallout	MacPlay				10.2–10.6.8
Fallout 2	MacPlay				10.2–10.6.8
Fantastic Farm					
A Farewell to Kings	Rob Steward, Inc.	2008	Card game	Shareware	10.3–10.5
Farming Simulator 2011	GIANTS Software	2010	Simulation	Commercial	10.5.8+
Fashion Cents Deluxe					
Fashion Cents Gents					
Fashion Dash					
Fashion Finder					
Fashion Fits					
Fast Five the Movie: Official Game	Gameloft	2011	Racing	Commercial	10.6.6+
Fatale	Tale of Tales	2009	Adventure	Commercial	10.4.5+
Fate					
Feeding Frenzy	Sprout Games	2004			
Ferazel's Wand	Ambrosia Software				
Field of Glory	Slitherine Software	2010	Turn-based strategy	Commercial	10.4+
Field of Glory - Immortal Fire	Slitherine Software	2010	Turn-based strategy	Commercial	10.4+
Field of Glory - Legions Triumphant	Slitherine Software	2011	Turn-based strategy	Commercial	10.4+
Field of Glory - Rise of Rome	Slitherine Software	2010	Turn-based strategy	Commercial	10.4+
Field of Glory - Storm of Arrows	Slitherine Software	2010	Turn-based strategy	Commercial	10.4+
Field of Glory - Swords and Scimitars	Slitherine Software	2010	Turn-based strategy	Commercial	10.4+
The Final Battle	CrazySoft	2009	Adventure	Commercial	10.4+
Final Doom	GT Interactive	1996	First person shooter	Commercial	7.6-9.0, 10.x
Finding Nemo	THQ		Interactive	Commercial	10.4+
Finding Nemo Underwater World of Fun	THQ		Interactive	Commercial	10.4+
Firefall Arcade	Pangea Software	1993	Action	Freeware	7–9
First Class Flurry					
Fish!					
FishCo					
Fishdom	Playrix	2008	Puzzle		
Fishdom H2O: Hidden Odyssey	Playrix	2009	Puzzle		10.4
Fishie Fishie					
Fitness Dash					
Fitness Frenzy					
Fix-it-up: Kate's Adventure					
Flashback: The Quest for Identity					
FlatOut 2					
Flight Control HD	Firemint	2010	Action	Commercial	
FlightGear	FlightGear Team	2006	Flight simulator	Open source	10.4+
Flip Words 2					
Floating Kingdoms					
FlopZoom					
Flower Shop: Big City Break					
Flux Family Secrets: The Ripple Effect					
Fly!	Terminal Reality	1999	Flight simulator	Commercial	8.5
Fly! 2K	Terminal Reality	2000	Flight simulator	Commercial	9.0
Fly! II	Terminal Reality	2001	Flight simulator	Commercial	8.6–9.2.2, 10.1
Flying Nightmares	Simis Limited	1994	Flight simulator	Commercial	7–9.2.2
Food Chain	Cajun Games	1998	Strategy-board game	Commercial	7.1.2
The Fool's Errand	Cliff Johnson/Miles Computing	1987	Puzzle	Commercial/Freeware	
Football Manager 2005	SEGA			Commercial	7.6.1–9.2.2
Football Manager 2006	SEGA			Commercial	7.6.1–9.2.2
Football Manager 2007	SEGA			Commercial	
Football Manager 2008	SEGA			Commercial	
Football Manager 2009	SEGA			Commercial	
Football Manager 2010	SEGA			Commercial	
Football Manager 2011	SEGA			Commercial	
Football Manager Live	SEGA			Commercial	
Ford Racing 2	Zonic Limited/Feral Interactive	2004	Driving simulation	Commercial	10.2 to 10.6.8
Foreign Legion: Buckets of Blood	Sakari Indie	2009	Action	Commercial	10.3.9+
Fortnite	Epic Games	2017	Adventure	Freeware	10.14.6+
Forever Growing Garden	Communication Wave/Media Vision	1993	Education	Commercial	7.1
Fortoresse	Atelier 801	2014	Indie	Commercial	
Fortune-499	AP Thomson	2018	Role-playing		
Fortune Tiles Gold					
Fox Minesweeper					
Frankenstein: Through the Eyes of the Monster	Amazing Media	1995	Adventure	Commercial	7–9
Freaky Creatures					
Freddi Fish and the Case of the Missing Kelp Seeds	Humongous	1995	Adventure	Freeware	
Freddi Fish 2: The Case of the Haunted Schoolhouse	Humongous	1996	Adventure	Freeware	
Freddi Fish 3: The Case of the Stolen Conch Shell	Humongous	1998	Adventure	Freeware	
Freddi Fish 4: The Case of the Hogfish Rustlers of Briny Gulch	Humongous	1999	Adventure	Freeware	
Freddi Fish 5: The Case of the Creature of Coral Cove	Humongous	2001	Adventure	Freeware	
FreeCol	FreeCol Team	2007	Turn-based strategy	Freeware	10.4+
Freedom Force					
Freespace 2	Volition	2005	Space combat/simulation	Open-Source	10.2.8+
Freestyle Dirt Bike	XLab Technologies	2011	Racing	Commercial	10.6.6+
Frenzic					
Frets on Fire					
The Friends of Ringo Ishikawa	Yeo	2018	Beat 'em up	Commercial	
Frog Xing	Quarter Note Software	1996	Action	Shareware	7.0–9.2.2
Frogatto & Friends	Frogatto Team	2010	Platform	Freeware	10.4+
Frogger	Konami	1984	Action	Commercial	1–5
Frostpunk	11 Bit Studios	2021	City-building survival	Commercial	10.13+
Frostpunk 2	11 Bit Studios	2024	City-building survival	Commercial	14.5+ (M1+)
Frozen Bubble					
FRS Money Math					
Fruit Swap					
Frutakia					
Fruzzle					
Full Contact Debate					
Full Throttle	LucasArts Entertainment	1995		Commercial	
Fungus	Ryan Koopmans	1994	Puzzle/Strategy	Shareware	8-9
Fury of the Furries	Kalisto Entertainment	1994	Platform	Commercial	7–8
Future Cop: LAPD	Electronic Arts			Commercial	7.6.1–9.2.2
futureU					

== G ==
Title	Developer/publisher	Release date	Genre	License	Mac OS versions
G2: Geeks Unleashed					
Gabriel Knight	Sierra		Adventure	Commercial	
Gabriel Knight 2: The Beast Within	Sierra		Adventure	Commercial	
Galactic Assault: Prisoner Of Power	Wargaming.net	2008	Turn-based strategy	Commercial	10.4.11+
Galactic Core	Richard White/Spiderweb Software		Strategy	Commercial	1.0, 1.0.1, 1.0.4
Galactic Frontiers	Soft Stream International	1991			
Galapagos: Mendel's Escape					
Galcon					
Galder					
Gallop for Gold Slots					
The Game of LIFE	Sarbakan	2009	Board game	Commercial	10.5+
The Game of LIFE: Path to Success	Sarbakan	2008	Simulation	Commercial	10.3.9+
Game Room	Webfoot Technologies	2011	Sports	Commercial	10.6.6+
GameHouse Solitaire Challenge					
Gangland	MediaMobsters	2005	Strategy/RPG/simulation	Commercial	10.2.8
Garage: Bad Dream Adventure	Kinotrope	1999	Adventure/Horror		
Garry's Mod	Facepunch Studios	2010	Sandbox/physics	Commercial	10.5.8+
Gates of Troy	Slitherine Software	2005	Turn-based strategy	Commercial	10.2
Gauntlet					
Gaztrans Lite					
Gemini Lost					
Gems					
Geneforge	Spiderweb Software	2001	RPG	Shareware	
Geneforge 2	Spiderweb Software	2003	RPG	Shareware	
Geneforge 3	Spiderweb Software	2005	RPG	Shareware	
Geneforge 4: Rebellion	Spiderweb Software	2006	RPG	Shareware	
Geneforge 5: Overthrow	Spiderweb Software	2009	RPG	Shareware	
Genital Jousting	Free Lives/Devolver Digital	2018	Party	Commercial	10.8+
Germ Patrol					
G.H.O.S.T. Chronicles					
Ghost Master	Zonic Limited/Feral Interactive	2003	Humorous Strategy	Commercial	
Tom Clancy's Ghost Recon		2001		First shooter	
Tom Clancy's Ghost Recon: Desert Siege		2001		First shooter	
GiantCrayon Hangman					
GiantCrayon LunarMines					
GiantCrayon SudokuArcarde					
GiantCrayon TaiwanTiles					
GiantCrayon Tic-Tac-Toe					
GiantCrayon WordSoup					
Giants: Citizen Kabuto					
Giggles Computer Funtime For Baby					
Gish					
GL Golf					
Gladiator Trials II					
Glass Tower 2	Gadgetcrafts	2011	Puzzle/physics	Commercial	10.6.6+
Glider	John Calhoun	1988	Action	Freeware	7.0 and higher
Glypha	John Calhoun		Action	Shareware	6.0 and higher
Glypha II	John Calhoun	1991	Action	Freeware	6.0 and higher
Glypha III	John Calhoun	1990	Action	Shareware	6.0 and higher
The Gnome Herder	RAMDreams	2007	Sports/physics	Freeware	10.3+
Gnop!	Alex Seropian/Bungie	1990	Action	Commercial	
Go Ollie!					
Go-Go Gourmet					
Go-go Gourmet 2: Chef of the Year					
The Goalkeeper	Winter Wolves	2006	Simulation	Shareware	10.1+
Gold Fever					
Gold Rush: Treasure Hunt					
Golden Logres	LittleWing	1998	Pinball	Shareware	8.1, 10.3.9+
GooBall	Ambrosia Software				
googol-Choo-Choo 3D					
Gorky 17					
Governor of Poker					
Graal Kingdoms					
Grand Theft Auto III	Rockstar Games	2010	Action	Commercial	10.5.8+
Grand Theft Auto: San Andreas	Rockstar Games	2010	Action	Commercial	10.5.8+
Grand Theft Auto: Vice City	Rockstar Games	2010	Action	Commercial	10.5.8+
Grappling Hook					
GrassGames' Cribbage					
Gratuitous Space Battles	Positech Games	2010	Strategy/simulation	Commercial	10.4+
GravOIDS	John Roland Penner	2025	Action	Commercial	13.5+
The Graveyard	Tale of Tales	2008	Simulation	Shareware	10.1+
The Great Chocolate Chase: A Chocolatier Twist	ZEMNOTT	2008	Simulation	Commercial	10.4+
The Great International Word Search!	Fire Maple Games	2009	Puzzle	Commercial	10.4+
The Great Tree	Reflexive Entertainment	2008	Action	Commercial	10.4+
Gregory and the Hot Air Balloon	Broderbund	1996	Adventure	Commercial	7.0 until 7.6
GRID 2	Feral Interactive	2014	Motor racing	Commercial	
Gridiant					
Gridz	Green Dragon Creations	1997	Action	Shareware/Commercial	
GroMobile					
Ground Zero	MindSport	1984	Action	Commercial	
Guerrilla Bob	Angry Mob Games	2011	Action	Commercial	10.5+
Guess The Phrase!					
Guitar Hero: Aerosmith					
Guitar Hero III: Legends of Rock					
Guitar Hero: World Tour	Neversoft	2009	Music	Commercial	10.5.6+
Guns of Icarus	Muse Games	2009	Action	Commercial	10.4+

== H ==
Title	Developer/publisher	Release date	Genre	License	Mac OS versions
Hacker Evolution: Untold					
Half-Life 2	Valve	2010	First-person shooter	Commercial	10.5.8, 10.6.6+
Half-Life 2: Deathmatch	Valve	2010	First-person shooter	Commercial	10.5.8, 10.6.3+
Half-Life 2: Episode One	Valve	2010	First-person shooter	Commercial	10.5.8, 10.6.3+
Half-Life 2: Episode Two	Valve	2010	First-person shooter	Commercial	10.5.8, 10.6.3+
Halloween Sudoku					
Halo: Combat Evolved					10.2.8-10.6.6
Hangman Pro					
Hap Hazard 1.0mac					
Happy Birthday in Comfyland	Comfy Easy Keys	1997	Educational	Commercial	
Hard Rock Racing	Decane	2011	Racing	Commercial	10.6.6+
Hardcore Dirt Bike	XLab Technologies	2011	Racing	Commercial	10.6.6+
Harmonic Convergence					
Harpoon					
Harrier Strike Mission					
Harry the Handsome Executive					
Harry Potter and the Chamber of Secrets					
Harry Potter and the Order of the Phoenix					
Harry Potter and the Philosopher's Stone	Aspyr Media	2001			8.6-9, 10.1
Harvest: Massive Encounter					
A Hat in Time	Gears for Breakfast	2014	Platform	Commercial	
Haunted Hotel					
The Haunted House	Mark A. Klink	1994	Educational	Commercial	7.0 - 7.6 - 9
Haven and Hearth	Seatribe		MMORPG	Open source	
Head Over Heels	Tomaz Kac	2003	Adventure	Freeware	10.1
HeartNote					
Hearts of Iron	Paradox Entertainment	2003	Strategy/War	Commercial	9.2.2, 10.1
Hearts of Iron II	Paradox Interactive	2005	Strategy/War	Commercial	10.1+
Hearts of Iron II: Doomsday	Paradox Interactive	2006	Strategy/War	Commercial	10.1+
Hearts of Iron II: Doomsday - Armageddon	Paradox Interactive	2007	Strategy/War	Commercial	10.3.9+
Hearts of Iron III	Paradox Interactive	2009	Strategy/War	Commercial	10.5.8+
Hearts of Iron III: Semper Fi	Paradox Interactive	2010	Strategy/War	Commercial	10.5.8+
Heartwild Solitaire					
Hedgewars	Hedgewars Project	2006	Artillery game/Turn-based tactics	Open Source	
Heileen					
Heileen: A Trip To Bavaria					
Hell Cab	Digital Fusion	1993	Adventure	Commercial	6.0.7
Hellcats Over the Pacific	Parsoft Interactive	1991	Flight simulator	Commercial	7–9
Hello Neighbor	Dynamic Pixels/tinyBuild	2017	Stealth, survival horror		
Hell's Kitchen					
Heretic	Raven Software	1998	First-person shooter	Open source	7.1.2–8.5.1
Heretic II	Raven Software	2002	Action	Commercial	8.6–9, 10.1.4
Heroes of Might and Magic	New World Computing	1996	Turn-based strategy	Commercial	7.x
Heroes of Might and Magic II	New World Computing	1997	Turn-based strategy	Commercial	7.x
Heroes of Might and Magic III					
Heroes of Might and Magic IV					
Heroes of Might and Magic V					
HexAddict					
Hexen	Raven Software	1996		Commercial	
Hexen II					
Hidden Agenda					
Hidden Expedition: Amazon					
Hidden Expedition: Everest					
Hidden Mysteries: Buckingham Palace					
Hidden Mysteries - Civil War					
The Hidden Object Show	Banzai Interactive	2008	Hidden object	Commercial	10.3.9+
The Hidden Object Show Season 2	Gogii Games	2008	Hidden object	Commercial	10.3.9+
Hidden Relics					
Hidden Secrets: The Nightmare					
Hidden Wonders of the Depths					
The History Channel: Lost Worlds	Canopy Games	2008	Hidden object	Commercial	10.4+
The Hitchhiker's Guide to the Galaxy					
Hitman: Absolution — Elite Edition	Feral Interactive	2014	Stealth	Commercial	
HOARD	Big Sandwich Games	2011	Action/strategy	Commercial	10.5.8+
Hobby Farm	Playmink	2011	Strategy/simulation	Commercial	10.6.3+
Hockey Fight Pro	Ratrod Studio	2011	Fighting	Commercial	10.6.6+
Hockey Nations 2011	Distinctive Developments	2011	Sports	Commercial	10.6.6+
Hold'em Sidekick					
Holiday Gift					
Holiday Lemmings	DMA Design	1994	Puzzle	Commercial	6.0.5–9
Hollow Ground Special Edition					
Hollow Knight	Team Cherry	2017	Action-adventure	Commercial	10.13+
Hollywood High					
Hollywood Hijinx					
Home Sweet Home					
Homeworld 2					
Hordes of Orcs	Freeverse	2007	Action	Commercial	10.3.0+
Hordes of Orcs 2	Freeverse	2010	Action	Commercial	10.3.0+
Hospital Hustle					
Hot Dish 2: Cross Country Cook-Off					
Hotel	Cateia Games	2010	Adventure	Commercial	10.4+
Hotei's Jewels: Relax					
HOXChess					
Hoyle Card Games 2010					
Hoyle Casino 2010					
Hoyle Puzzle & Board games 2010					
Hoyle Slots 2010					
HTR HD High Tech Racing	QUByte Interactive	2011	Simulation/racing	Commercial	10.6.6+
Huggly Saves the Turtles	Mindsai Productions	2000	Educational	Commercial	7.5.5
Hula Hamsters	3A Studios/Viva Media	2004	Edutainment	Commercial	
Hydrothermal					
HyperDungeon	Sean Furey, HyperSoft	1994	Dungeon Crawler/Adventure	Commercial	7.0 - 7.6 - 9
HyperTris	David Shelley	1999	Puzzle	Commercial	7.0 - 7.6 - 9

== I ==
Title	Developer/publisher	Release date	Genre	License	Mac OS versions
Ice Cream Craze: Tycoon Takeover					
Iceblast!					
Icewind Dale					
iChess					
Icon Invasion	Jon Gary	1991	Action	Commercial	7.0 - 7.6 - 9
iConquer					
iDice					
iDistract					
iDrone	Burningthumb Software				
iFactor					
iFire					
Imagine Poker					
Imperial Glory	Robosoft Technologies/Feral Interactive	2006	Real-time strategy	Commercial	
Imperialism	Frog City Software	1997	Strategy	Commercial	7–9
Imperialism II: The Age of Exploration	Frog City Software	1999	Strategy	Commercial	7.6–9.0.4
Impossible Sudoku					
In The Groove					
The Incredible Machine	Jeff Tunnell Productions	1992	Puzzle/physics	Commercial	7.1
The Incredible Machine: Even More Contraptions	Sierra	2001	Puzzle/physics	Commercial	8.5.1–9.2.2
The Incredible Machine: Version 3.0	Jeff Tunnell Productions	1995	Puzzle/physics	Commercial	7.5
The Incredible Toon Machine	Jeff Tunnell Productions	1994	Puzzle/physics	Commercial	6–9
The Incredibles					
The Incredibles: Rise of the Underminer					
The Incredibles: When Danger Calls					
Indiana Jones and His Desktop Adventures	LucasArts	1996	Adventure	Commercial	7–8
Indiana Jones and the Emperor's Tomb					
Indiana Jones and the Fate of Atlantis					
Indiana Jones and the Last Crusade: The Graphic Adventure	Lucasfilm Games	1990	Adventure	Commercial	6–9
IndyCar Racing II	Papyrus Design Group	1996	Racing	Commercial	7.1–9.2.2
Infidel					
Insectoid	ActionSoft	2009	Action	Shareware	10.4+
InstrumentChamp	Music Instrument Champ	2015	Mac OSX and PC		
Interpol: The Trail of Dr. Chaos					
io					
iPoker					
I.Q. Identity Quest					
iQuiz Maker					
Iron Helix					
Iron Wars	Tap Mobile	2011	Action	Commercial	10.6.6+
Irukandji	Charlie's Games	2009	Top-down shooter	Commercial	10.4+
Ishar: Legend of the Fortress	Silmarils	1992	RPG	Commercial	5–7.0
Ishar 2: Messengers of Doom	Silmarils	1994	RPG	Commercial	6.0.3
Ishar 3: The Seven Gates of Infinity	Silmarils	1995	RPG	Commercial	7.0
Ishido: The Way of Stones	MacPlay	1994	Puzzle	Commercial	7+
Island Defender	Bruce A. Pokras	1997	Action	Commercial	7.0 - 7.6 - 9
Island Racer					
Islands Mini Golf					
iSnap					
iStriker: Rescue & Combat	C2 Matrix	2011	Top-down shooter	Commercial	10.6.6+
Ivory					
μMahjong					

== J ==
Title	Developer/publisher	Release date	Genre	License	Mac OS versions
Jack Keane					
Jack Nicklaus' Greatest 18 Holes of Major Championship Golf	Sculptured Software/Accolade		Sports game		
Jack O'Lighter					
Jade Empire: Special Edition					
Jagged Alliance: Back in Action	Bigmoon Studios/bitComposer/Kalypso Media	2014	Turn-based tactics	Commercial	10.7+
Jagged Alliance: Flashback	Full Control	2014	Turn-based tactics	Commercial	10.6+
Jalada's Malliouhana					
Jalada's Spinball					
James Bond 007: Goldfinger	Angelsoft/Mindscape Inc.	1986	Text adventure	Commercial	
James Bond 007: Nightfire					
James Bond 007: A View to a Kill	Angelsoft/Mindscape Inc.	1985	Text adventure	Commercial	
James Clavell's Shōgun					
Jammin' Racer					
Jane's Hotel					
Jane's Hotel: Family Hero					
Jane's Realty					
Jason vs Zombies	ASteam	2011	Action/horror	Commercial	10.6.6+
Jasper's Journeys					
Jazz Jackrabbit 2					
Jeopardy! Super Deluxe					
Jessica's Cupcake Cafe					
Jet					
Jetlane	Skydome Studios	2011	Racing	Commercial	10.6.6+
Jetpack					
Jets'n'Guns					
Jets'n'Guns Gold					
Jewelbox					
Jewel Match 2					
Jewel of Arabia: Dreamers	Quarter Note Software		RPG	Shareware	
Jewel of Atlantis					
Jewel Quest II					
Jewel Quest III					
Jewel Quest Mysteries					
Jewel Quest Solitaire					
Jewel Twist					
Jewels of the Oracle	Dreamcatcher Interactive	1996	Puzzle	Commercial	7.1+
Jigsaws Galore	Gray Design Associates	2006	Puzzle	Commercial	10.5+
Jinni Zeala	LittleWing	2002	Pinball	Shareware	8.6–9.2.2, 10.1+
Jolly Rover	Brawsome	2010	Adventure	Commercial	10.4+
Journey					
The Journeyman Project	Presto Studios	1993	Adventure	Commercial	
The Journeyman Project 2: Buried in Time	Presto Studios	1995	Adventure	Commercial	
The Journeyman Project 3: Legacy of Time	Red Orb Entertainment	1998	Adventure	Commercial	
The Journeyman Project Turbo!	Presto Studios	1994	Adventure	Commercial	
The Journeyman Project: Pegasus Prime	Presto Studios	1997	Adventure	Commercial	
JSudoku					
Jurassic Park III: Dino Defender	Knowledge Adventure	2001	Action/Adventure	Commercial	8.1, 8.6. 9.1 and 10.1

== K ==
Title	Developer/publisher	Release date	Genre	License	Mac OS versions
Kakuro Epic	Kristanix Games	2009	Puzzle	Shareware	10.3.9+
Kalahari Sun Slots	Pokie Magic	2009	Gambling	Shareware	10.4.1+
Kaptain Brawe: A Brawe New World	Cateia Games	2011	Adventure	Commercial	10.4+
Kartofel	Paweł Aleksander Fedoryński		Puzzle	Open source	OS X
Kasino	baKno			Shareware	OS X
Kaskade	ShoeCake Games		Puzzle	Shareware	
Kathy Rain	Clifftop Games/Raw Fury	2016	Adventure	Commercial	10.6+
Kelly Slater's Pro Surfer	Treyarch	2003	Sports	Commercial	10.2.3
Keno Pool	baKno Games				OS X
Kick Off 2002	Anco Software	2002	Sports	Commercial	9.0–9.2.2, 10.1–10.3
Kickin Soccer	Phelios Inc	2006	Sports	Shareware	10.2+
Kid Mystic	Hamumu Software	2005	Action	Commercial	OS X
Kill Monty!	Justin Ficarrotta	2005	Action	Commercial	10.2.8+
Killing Floor	Tripwire Interactive	2010	First-person shooter	Commercial	10.5.8+
Kindergarten					
King's Quest II: Romancing the Throne	Sierra	1987	Adventure	Commercial	
KingMania: North Kingdom	Rake In Grass	2009	Strategy	Shareware	10.3+
Kitty Spangles Solitaire	Swoop Software		Card game	Shareware	10.3.9+
Kitty Spangles Sudoku	Swoop Software		Puzzle	Shareware	10.4.11+
Kivi's Underworld	Soldak Entertainment		RPG	Shareware	10.4+
Klondike Forever			Card game	Freeware	10.4+
Knights and Merchants	Joymania Entertainment	1998	Real-time strategy	Commercial	
KnightShift	Reality Pump Studios	2005	RPG/real-time strategy	Commercial	10.2.4
Koth					
KrabbitWorld Origins					
Kudos	Positech Games	2006	Life Simulation	Commercial	
Kudos 2	Positech Games	2008	Life Simulation	Commercial	
Kudos: Rock Legend	Positech Games	2007	Life Simulation	Commercial	
Kult: Heretic Kingdoms	3D People	2005	RPG	Commercial	
Kung Fu Panda	Beenox	2009	Action/adventure	Commercial	10.4.11, 10.5.6+
Kusogerine	VENIO	2009	Shooter	Freeware	10.4+

== L ==
Title	Developer/publisher	Release date	Genre	License	Mac OS versions
Labyrinth					
The Labyrinth of Time	Terra Nova Development/Electronic Arts	1993	Graphic Adventure	Commercial	
Ladybugs					
Land Air Sea Warfare	Isotope 244 Graphics	2010	Real-time strategy	Commercial	10.2+
Larva Mortus					
Laserface Jones vs Doomsday Odious					
Laura Jones & the Gates of Good and Evil					
Laura Jones and the Secret Legacy of Nikola Tesla					
LavaPit					
Law & Order: Dead on the Money					
League of Legends	Riot Games	2013	MOBA	Commercial	
Learn to Draw with Mrs. Hoogestraat					
Learning Adventures! I Can Be an Animal Doctor	Cloud 9 Interactive/Macmillan Digital Publishing	1998	Educational	Commercial	7.1
Learning Adventures! I Can Be a Dinosaur Finder	Cloud 9 Interactive/Macmillan Digital Publishing	1997	Educational	Commercial	7.1
Leather Goddesses of Phobos					
Leeloo's Talent Agency					
Left 4 Dead	Valve	2010	First-person shooter	Commercial	10.6.4+
Left 4 Dead 2	Valve	2010	First-person shooter	Commercial	10.6.4+
Legend of Aladdin					
The Legend of Crystal Valley	Cateia Games	2009	Adventure	Commercial	10.4+
The Legend of Kyrandia: Fables and Fiends	Westwood Studios	1992	Adventure	Commercial	7.1
The Legend of Kyrandia: Hand of Fate	Westwood Studios	1993	Adventure	Commercial	
The Legend of Kyrandia: Malcolm's Revenge	Westwood Studios	1994	Adventure	Commercial	7.5
Legion	Slitherine Software	2003	Strategy	Commercial	9.2, 10.1.3
Legion Arena	Slitherine Software	2006	Strategy	Commercial	10.3.9+
Legion Arena: Cult of Mithras	Slitherine Software	2006	Strategy	Commercial	10.3.9+
Legions	Mindscape	1994	Strategy	Commercial	
Lego Batman: The Videogame	Robosoft Technologies/Feral Interactive	2009	Action	Commercial	10.4.10+
LEGO Batman 2: DC Super Heroes	TT Games/Feral Interactive	2012	Action/adventure	Commercial	
LEGO Batman 3: Beyond Gotham	TT Games/Feral Interactive	2014	Action/adventure	Commercial	
Lego Harry Potter: Years 1-4	Open Planet Software/Feral Interactive	2011	Action/adventure	Commercial	10.6+
LEGO Harry Potter: Years 5–7	TT Games/Feral Interactive	2012	Action/adventure	Commercial	
LEGO The Hobbit	TT Games/Feral Interactive	2014	Action/adventure	Commercial	
Lego Indiana Jones: The Original Adventures	Open Planet Software/Feral Interactive	2008	Action/adventure	Commercial	10.4.10+
Lego Indiana Jones 2: The Adventure Continues	Open Planet Software/Feral Interactive	2011	Action/adventure	Commercial	10.6+
LEGO The Lord of the Rings	TT Games/Feral Interactive	2013	Action/adventure	Commercial	
LEGO Marvel Super Heroes	TT Games/Feral Interactive	2014	Action/adventure	Commercial	
The Lego Movie Videogame	TT Games/Feral Interactive	2014	Action/adventure	Commercial	
LEGO Star Wars III: The Clone Wars	TT Games/Feral Interactive	2013	Action/adventure	Commercial	
Lego Star Wars: The Complete Saga	Robosoft Technologies/Feral Interactive	2010	Action/adventure	Commercial	10.5.8+
LEGO Star Wars: The Original Trilogy	Robosoft Technologies/Feral Interactive	2007	Action/adventure	Commercial	10.4+
Lego Star Wars: The Video Game	Traveller's Tales Ltd.	2005	Action/adventure	Commercial	10.3.8+
LEGO Universe	NetDevil	2010	MMOG	Commercial	10.5.8+
Lemmings	DMA Design	1992	Puzzle	Commercial	7–9
Lemonade Tycoon 2: New York Edition					
Let's Create! Pottery	Infinite Dreams	2011	Simulation/art	Commercial	10.6.6+
Let's Golf! 2	Gameloft	2011	Sports	Commercial	10.6.6+
Letter Boxed					
Letterpress	atebits/Solebon LLC	2016	Word		10.8+
Lies of P	Neowiz, Round8 Studio/Neowiz	2023	Action RPG	Commercial	13.0+ (M1+)
Life & Death					
LinCity-NG	(Open Project)	2008	City-building	Freeware	10.4.5+
Lineage					
Lines					
LinkLines					
Links Championship Edition					
Liquid Defense					
LiquidMac					
Little Hoppers Math Tac Toe					
Little Hoppers Sight Words Game					
Little Hoppers Treasure Hunt					
Little Shop: City Lights					
Little Shop: Memories					
Little Shop of Treasures 2					
Little Shop: Road Trip					
Little Shop: World Traveler					
Little Space Duo	Jugilus	2009	Puzzle	Commercial	10.3+
Lock Poker					
Lode Runner					
Lode Runner 2					
Lode Runner: The Legend Returns	Presage Software	1994	Platform	Commercial	7–9
Lode Runner On-Line: The Mad Monks' Revenge	Presage Software	1995	Platform	Commercial	7–9
LookAtMe!					
Loom					
Loony Labyrinth	LittleWing	1994	Pinball	Shareware	7.5, 10.1+
The Lord of the Rings: The Return of the King					
The Lord of the Rings: War in the North	Feral Interactive	2013	Action RPG	Commercial	
The Lost Cases of Sherlock Holmes	Legacy Interactive	2008	Hidden object	Commercial	10.4.10+
Lost City of Aquatica 1.0 Lost City of Aquatica					
Lost City of Z					
Lost in Paradise	Elev8 Games	July 24, 2014	Adventure/puzzle	Commercial	10.7+
Lost in the Pyramid					
Lost Realms: Legacy of the Sun Princess					
Lost Secrets: Bermuda Triangle					
Lost Souls	Richard White/Spiderweb Software		RPG	?	
Lovely Kitchen					
LuaLua					
Lucy's Expedition					
Lugaru					
Lumen					
Lunar Phantom	Rolf Staflin	Aug 20, 1995	Action	Shareware	
Lunar Rescue	Practical Computer Applications	1988	Scrolling shooter	Commercial	
Lunicus	Cyberflix Incorporated/Paramount Interactive	1994	First-person shooter/adventure	Commercial	6.0.7
The Lurking Horror					
Lux Delux					
Luxor					
Luxor 2					
Luxor 3					

== M ==
Title	Developer/publisher	Release date	Genre	License	Mac OS versions
M&M's The Lost Formulas	Simon & Schuster Interactive	2000	Educational	Commercial	
M4	Dangerous Software	1992	Military simulation		
Mac Challenger	William Volk/Aegis Development, Inc.	1985	Simulation	Commercial	
MacATC					
MacBornes	Alexandre Colucci	2005	Card game	Freeware	10.4–10.14
Machinarium	Amanita Design	2009	Adventure	Commercial	10.4+
Machines at War					
MacIago					
MacJong					
MacKakuro					
Mac Tuberling	John Calhoun	1990	Early Childhood		
MacPinball					
MacPips Jigsaw Puzzle					
MacPool					
MAD Daedalus	LittleWing	2010	Pinball	Shareware	10.3.9+
Mad Dog McCree (1994)	American Laser Games	1994	Rail shooter	Commercial	7.5
Mad Dog McCree (2002)	American Laser Games	2002	Rail shooter	Commercial	10.1
Mad Max (2015)	Feral Interactive	2016	Action-adventure/open world	Commercial	10.11.6+
Mad Skills Motocross	Turborilla		Racing	Commercial	10.3
Madballs in Babo: Invasion	Playbrains	2010	Action	Commercial	10.5+
Madden NFL 08	EA Tiburon	2007	Sports	Commercial	
Madden NFL 2000	EA Tiburon	1999	Sports	Commercial	7.5.3–9
Mae Q'West and the Sign of the Stars					
Maelstrom					
Mafia II: Director's Cut	Feral Interactive	2010	Action-adventure/open world	Commercial	10.6.8+
Mafia III	Aspyr Media, Inc.	2017	Action-adventure/open world	Commercial	10.12.4+
Maggie the Gardener					
Magic Dice					
Magic Match Adventures					
Magic Stones					
The Magician's Handbook: Cursed Valley	BC Soft Games	2008	Hidden object	Commercial	10.4+
Mah Jong Solitaire					
Mahjong Epic					
Mahjong Forests					
Mahjong Solitarus					
Mahjongg: Ancient Mayas					
Majestic Forest					
Majesty: The Fantasy Kingdom Sim	Cyberlore Studios	2000	Real-time strategy	Commercial	8.6
Majesty 2: Battles of Ardania	1C Company	2010	Real-time strategy	Commercial	10.6.3+
Majesty 2: The Fantasy Kingdom Sim	1C Company	2010	Real-time strategy	Commercial	10.6.3+
Majesty 2: Kingmaker	1C Company	2010	Real-time strategy	Commercial	10.6.3+
Majesty 2: Monster Kingdom	1C Company	2011	Real-time strategy	Commercial	10.6.3+
Make Bouncy Bouncy					
The Manhole					
Marathon					
Marathon 2: Durandal					
Marathon Infinity					
Marble Arena					
Marble Blast Gold					
Marble Blast Ultra					
Mario is Missing					
Marooned					
Mars Rising					
Martians Vs. Robots					
Massive Assault					
Master Kick					
Master of Orion II					
Master of Orion III					
Math Rabbit Deluxe	The Learning Company	1996	Educational	Commercial	7.0+
Math-teroid: Multiplication					
Max Payne	Feral Interactive	2002	Action/adventure	Commercial	
Maxi Dice					
Maximum Pool					
Maze War		1985, 1974 (Xerox Alto)			
MazeWars+	Macromind	1987			
MDK					
Mean Girls					
Meat Boy					
MechWarrior 2: 31st Century Combat					
Medal of Honor: Allied Assault					
Medal of Honor: Breakthrough					
Medal of Honor: Spearhead					
Mega BrickBash 3000					
Mega Fifteen					
Mega Hearts 2 Slots					
Megaplex Madness: Now Playing					
Merriam Webster Spell-Jam					
A Mess O' Trouble	Ray Dunakin	1997	Adventure	Shareware	7.5–9.2.2
Meteor Storm	Z Sculpt Entertainment	1996	Action	Commercial	7–9, 10.1+
Mia's Language Adventure: The Kidnap Caper	Kutoka Interactive	2003	Educational	Commercial	OS X+
Mia's Math Adventure: Just in Time!	Kutoka Interactive	2001	Educational	Commercial	OS X+
Mia's Reading Adventure: The Bugaboo Bugs	Kutoka Interactive	2007	Educational	Commercial	OS X+
Mia's Reading Adventure: The Search for Grandma's Remedy	Kutoka Interactive	1999	Educational	Commercial	9+
Mia's Science Adventure: Romaine's New Hat	Kutoka Interactive	2000	Educational	Commercial	OS X+
Microbop					
Micropul					
Microsoft Flight Simulator					
MicroWar (aka μWar) 1.0	MadDog	1999	Action	Open Source	7.6-9
MicroWar 2.0	MadDog	2008	Action	Open Source	10.3.9-10.6
Midnight Mansion					
Mighty Mike (formerly Power Pete)					
MilkSnake	Dag Ågren	2011	Action	Commercial	10.6.6+
Milky Way Prince: The Vampire Star	Eyeguys/Santa Ragione	2020	Visual novel	Commercial	10.6.8+
Millie's Math House	Edmark	1992	Educational	Commercial	
Million Dollar Password 2009 Edition					
Mine Field Hex					
A Mind Forever Voyaging	Infocom	1985	Interactive fiction	Commercial	1.0–9.2.2
Minecraft	Mojang	2011	Sandbox	Commercial	
Mini Ninjas	Robosoft Technologies/Feral Interactive	2010	Action	Commercial	10.5.8+
Minigolf Mania					
MiniOne Racing					
Minions of Mirth					
Minotaur: The Labyrinths of Crete					
Miriel the Magical Merchant					
Miriel's Enchanted Mystery					
MirrorMoon EP	Santa Ragione	2013	Adventure	Commercial	10.6+
Miss Teri Tale					
Miss Teri Tale: Vote 4 Me					
Missed Messages	Angela He	2019	Visual novel	Freeware	10.12+
Mission: Firestorm					
Mission: Thunderbolt					
Mister Sudoku					
Modern Combat: Domination	Gameloft	2011	First-person shooter	Commercial	10.6.6+
Monarch: The Butterfly King					
Monkey Island 2: LeChuck's Revenge	Lucasfilm Games	1992	Adventure	Commercial	7–9
Monkey Money					
Monkey Shines	FantaSoft, LLC	1997	Platform	Shareware	
Monopoly (1987)	Thomas E. Fosson	1987	Board game	Commercial	6–7
Monopoly (1997)	Westwood Studios	1997	Board game	Commercial	7.5
Monopoly (2000)	Artech Studios	2000	Board game	Commercial	8.1–9.2.2
Monopoly Build-a-lot Edition					
Monopoly Classic	TikGames	2007	Board game	Commercial	10.3.9+
Monopoly Deluxe	Human Wave Technology	1994	Board game	Commercial	6–9
Monopoly Here & Now Edition	TikGames	2007	Board game	Commercial	10.3.9+
A Monster Ate My Homework	Geek Beach	2011	Puzzle/physics	Commercial	10.6.6+
Monster Fair	LittleWing	2004	Pinball	Shareware	10.3.9+
Monster Truck Rally	XLab Technologies	2011	Racing	Commercial	10.6.6+
Monster Trucks Nitro					
MonsterQuest					
Moonmist					
Mosaic: Tomb of Mystery					
Most Popular Solitaire					
m.o.t.e.s.					
Motor Bike	Brad Quick	1989	Racing	Shareware	6–9
Motorbike	Bakno Games	2011	Racing/physics	Commercial	10.1+
Mountain Tanks					
The Movies	Robosoft Technologies/Feral Interactive	2006	Simulation	Commercial	
The Movies: Stunts & Effects	Robosoft Technologies/Feral Interactive	2007	Simulation	Commercial	
The Movies: Superstar Edition	Robosoft Technologies/Feral Interactive	2009	Simulation	Commercial	
Mr Jones' Graveyard Shift					
Mtp Target					
MTX Mototrax					
Multiflyer					
Multiwinia					
Muppet Treasure Island	Activision	1996	Adventure	Commercial	7.5
Museum Madness	Novotrade	1994	Educational	Commercial	
Music Catch					
My Tribe					
My Turns Notifier					
MyMahj					
Myst	Cyan, Inc.	1993	Puzzle	Commercial	7.0.1+
Myst III: Exile	Presto Studios	2001	Puzzle	Commercial	8.1+
Myst IV: Revelation	Ubisoft	2004	Puzzle	Commercial	10.2–10.3
Myst Online: Uru Live					
Myst V: End of Ages	Cyan Worlds	2005	Puzzle	Commercial	10.2.8–10.4.0
Mystery Case Files: Return to Ravenhearst					
Mystery Chronicles: Murder Among Friends					
Mystery in London: On the Trail of Jack the Ripper					
Mystery Island II					
Mystery Masterpiece: The Moonstone					
Mystery Stories: Animal Agents					
Mystery Stories: Berlin Nights					
Mystery Stories: Island of Hope					
Mysteryville					
Mystic Diary: Lost Brother					
Mystic Emporium					
Mystic Mine					
Myth: The Fallen Lords	Bungie	1997	Real-Time Tactics	Commercial	
Myth II: Soulblighter	Bungie	1998	Real-Time Tactics	Commercial	
Myth III: The Wolf Age	Infogrames/MacSoft	2001	Real-Time Tactics	Commercial	9.0 or 10.1

== N ==
Title	Developer/publisher	Release date	Genre	License	Mac OS versions
N-Ball	Rag Doll Software	2005	Platform	Shareware	10.1+
Nancy Drew: Secrets Can Kill (Remastered)	Her Interactive	2010	Adventure/mystery	Commercial	10.5.8+
Nancy Drew: Shadow at the Water's Edge	Her Interactive	2010	Adventure/mystery	Commercial	10.5.8+
Nancy Drew: Trail of the Twister	Her Interactive	2010	Adventure/mystery	Commercial	10.5.8+
Nanny 911					
Nanny Mania					
Nanny Mania 2					
Nanogolf					
Nanosaur	Pangea Software	1998	Third Person Shooter	Commercial	8-9
Nanosaur 2: Hatchling	Pangea Software	2004	Third Person Shooter	Commercial	10.5.8+
NASCAR Racing	Papyrus Design Group	1996	Racing	Commercial	7.1
NASCAR Racing 2002 Season	Papyrus Design Group	2003	Racing	Commercial	10.1
NASCAR Racing 2003 Season	Papyrus Design Group	2003	Racing	Commercial	10.1
Napoleon: Total War - Gold Edition	Feral Interactive	2013	Action/real-time strategy	Commercial	
National Geographic Presents Herod's Lost Tomb					
National Geographic: Plan It Green					
Need for Speed: Carbon	EA Black Box/Electronic Arts	2007	Racing	Commercial	10.4.9+
Nekodancer	Atelier 801	2014		Commercial	
Neko Type-R					
Nemesis Go Master	Toyoga, Inc.	1994	Board Game		
Neon Mania	Vivid Games	2011	Art	Commercial	10.6.6+
Neon Tango					
Neptune's Secret					
Nessy GamesPlayer					
Nessy Tales					
Nethergate	Spiderweb Software	1999	RPG	Commercial	
Nethergate: Resurrection	Spiderweb Software	2007	RPG	Commercial	
Neverball					
Neverputt					
Neverwinter Nights					
Neverwinter Nights 2					
Neverwinter Nights: Hordes of the Underdark					
Neverwinter Nights: Shadows of Undrentide					
A New Beginning	Daedalic Entertainment	2010	Adventure	Commercial	
New Centurions					
New Star Grand Prix					
New Star Soccer					
Nexuiz					
NHL Eastside Hockey Manager 2007					
Nightfall					
The Nightshift Code	Black Hammer Productions	2008	Hidden object	Commercial	10.4+
Nightshift Legacy: The Jaguar's Eye					
NinjaQuestX					
NinJump Deluxe	Backflip Studios	2011	Action	Commercial	10.6.6+
No Gravity (Classic)	Realtech VR	2005	Space combat	Freeware	10.2.8+
No Gravity	Realtech VR	2011	Space combat	Commercial	10.6.6+
No One Lives Forever					
No One Lives Forever 2	Monolith Productions	2003	First-person shooter	Commercial	10.2.8+
Noble Avatar Generator					
Nobunaga's Ambition					
Nocturnal: Boston Nightfall					
NoLimits					
Nord and Bert Couldn't Make Head or Tail of It					
Northland	Funatics Software	2004	Real-time strategy	Commercial	9–9.2.2, 10.1–10.3
Nostradamus: The Last Prophecy	Kheops Studio	2010	Adventure	Commercial	10.4+
Now Boarding					
Numbers Up! Volcanic Panic World Web					
Numbers Up! 2 Baggin' the Dragon World Web					
Number Maze					
Numerati					
NyxQuest: Kindred Spirits	Over the Top Games	2010	Platform	Commercial	10.5.8+

== O ==
Title	Developer/publisher	Release date	Genre	License	Mac OS versions
Ocean Bound	Richard White/Spiderweb Software	1998	RPG	?	
Odell Down Under	Mecc	1995	Educational	Commercial	6.0.7+
Off-Road Velociraptor Safari	Flashbang Studios	2011	Racing	Commercial	10.6.6+
Oh No! More Lemmings	DMA Design	1993	Puzzle	Commercial	6.0.5–9
On The Rain-Slick Precipice of Darkness - Episode One	Hothead Games	2008	Adventure/RPG	Commercial	10.5+
On The Rain-Slick Precipice of Darkness - Episode Two	Hothead Games	2008	Adventure/RPG	Commercial	10.5+
Oni	Feral Interactive	2002	Action/adventure	Commercial	
Onverse					
Oolite	Giles Williams	2006	Space Trading	GNU General Public License.	10.4+
Oops!					
Open Sonic	Alexandre Martins	2010	Platform	Open source	10.5+
OpenArena					
OpenLieroX	Dark Charlie	2007	Action/strategy	Open source	10.3+
OpenTTD					
Operation Desert Storm					
Orbiter	Spectrum Holobyte		Flight simulator		
Orbz					
Order of Battle: Pacific	The Artistocrats/Slitherine Software	2015	Computer wargame	Commercial	10.7+
Oregon Trail II	MECC	1996	Adventure	Commercial	7.1+
Osmos					
OSX SkyFighters 1945					
Otis					
Otto Matic	Pangea Software	2001	Action-adventure	Commercial	8-X
Out of the Park Baseball 10					
Out of the Sun	Domark Software	1994	Flight simulator	Commercial	7–9
Ovid the Owl Act I					
Owl Country					
Oxyd	Dongleware Verlags	1992	Puzzle	Shareware	6–9
Oxyd Extra	Dongleware Verlags	1996	Puzzle	Commercial	7–9
Oxyd Magnum	Dongleware Verlags	1993	Puzzle	Shareware	6–9
Ozzie's Funtime Garden	Digital Impact	1995	Educational	Commercial	6.0.5 or later
Ozzie's World	Digital Impact	1994	Educational	Commercial	6.0.5 or later
Ozzy Bubbles					

== P ==
Title	Developer/publisher	Release date	Genre	License	Mac OS versions
Pac-In-Time	Kalisto Entertainment	1994	Platform	Commercial	7–8
Pairs					
Pajama Sam: No Need to Hide When It's Dark Outside	Humongous	1996	Adventure	Freeware	
Pajama Sam 2: Thunder and Lightning Aren't so Frightening	Humongous	1998	Adventure	Freeware	
Pajama Sam 3: You Are What You Eat from Your Head to Your Feet	Humongous	1999	Adventure	Freeware	
Pajama Sam 4: Life Is Rough When You Lose Your Stuff!	Humongous	2003	Adventure	Freeware	
Pakoon III: First Blood					
Palworld	Pocketpair	2025	action-adventure, survival	Commercial	14.0+ (M1+)
Pandemonium					
Pandora's Gearbox					
Pandora's Pests					
Pangea Arcade					
Panzer Corps	Lordz Games Studio/Flashback Games/Slitherine Software	2017	Computer wargame	Commercial	
Pararena	John Calhoun	1990	Sports	Shareware	6.x
Pararena 2.0	John Calhoun	1992	Sports	Commercial	6-9
Paradise Beach					
Paradise Pet Salon					
Parking Dash					
Parkitect	Texel Raptor	TBA	Construction and management simulation	Commercial	
Parsec	Parsec Team	2000	Space combat	Open source	8.5–9.2.2, 10.1
Party Down					
Party Planner					
Passport to Perfume					
The Path	Tale of Tales	2009	Adventure/horror	Commercial	10.5.6+
The Path: Prologue	Tale of Tales	2009	Adventure/horror	Freeware	10.5.6+
Pathways Into Darkness	Bungie	1993	First-person shooter	Commercial	
PatienceX					
Patton Versus Rommel					
2					
Pax Imperia	THQ			Commercial	10.2–10.3.9
Payback	Apex Designs	2003	Action	Commercial	8.6–9.2.2, 10.2.8
Peggle					
Peggle Nights					
PegIt					
PegLeg	Changeling Software	1994	Action	Commercial	6.0.7–8
Penguins Arena					
Penumbra: Black Plague	Frictional Games	2008	Adventure/horror/physics	Commercial	10.4+
Penumbra: Overture	Frictional Games	2008	Adventure/horror/physics	Commercial	10.4+
Penumbra: Requiem	Frictional Games	2008	Adventure/horror/physics	Commercial	10.4+
Per Oxyd	Dongleware Verlags	1995	Puzzle	Shareware	6–9
Pet Pals: Animal Doctor					
Pet Shop Hop					
Petal Palace					
Chuck Jones' Peter and the Wolf	IF/X Interactive/Time Warner Interactive	1994	Educational	Commercial	7.0+
Peter Pan					
Petz: Catz 2					
Petz: Dogz 2					
Petz Sports					
Phantasmagoria	Sierra	1995	Adventure/horror	Commercial	7.1
Phoenix Ball					
Pickup Words					
PictoWords					
Piggly	InterAction Studios	2009	Platform	Commercial	10.4+
Pillars of Garendall					
Pinball HD	Gameprom	2011	Pinball	Commercial	10.6.6+
Pinball Yeah!	Coderunners	2010	Pinball	Commercial	10.5.8+
Pingus					
Pipe Dream					
Pipmak					
Sid Meier's Pirates!	Robosoft Technologies/Feral Interactive	2008	Strategy/adventure	Commercial	10.4+
Pirates of the Caribbean Online					
Pirate Attack!					
Pirate Poker					
Pirate's Treasure					
Pixie					
Pizza Panic					
PlaneShift	Atomic Blue Corporation	2005	MMORPG	Freeware	10.4.11+
Planet Horse	Dancing Dots Studio	2010	Sports	Commercial	10.4+
Plant Tycoon					
Plants vs. Zombies	Popcap	2010			10.4.11-10.6.x
Plasma Pong	Steve Taylor	2007	Action	Freeware	10.4+
PlayDetective: Heartbreakers					
Playhouse Disney Preschool Time Online					
PlayMaker Football					
Plexer					
plobb!					
PlumeBoom: The First Chapter					
Plundered Hearts					
Pocahontas: Princess of the Powhatan					
Pocket Tanks					
Point of View					
Poker Copilot	Barbary Software SL	2008	Poker	Commercial	10.8+
Poker Ghost					
Poker Superstars II					
Poker Tournament Hero					
Polar Pays Slots					
Police Quest: In Pursuit of the Death Angel	Sierra	1987	Adventure	Commercial	6–7
Police Quest: Open Season	Sierra	1993	Adventure	Commercial	7.1
Polychromatic Funk Monkey					
The Polynomial	Dmytry Lavrov	2010	Space combat	Commercial	10.6.3+
Pontoon					
Pony World Deluxe					
Pool Shark					
PoolStars 3D Multi-player Online Pool and Snooker					
pop-pop					
Popnus Puzzle					
Populous					
Populous II					
Portal	Valve	2010	First-person shooter/puzzle	Commercial	10.5.8+
Portal 2	Valve	2011	First-person shooter/puzzle	Commercial	10.6.7+
Posh Boutique					
Postal	Ripcord Games	1997	Shoot'Em Up	Commercial	7.1+
Postal²					
PowerMonger	Bullfrog Productions	1994	Strategy	Commercial	7.5
Powerslam	Cobra Blade	2012	Wrestling	Commercial	10.4+
Pretty Good Solitaire					
PREDATORS	Fox Digital Entertainment	2011	Action/Beat-Em Up	Commercial	10.6.6+
Prey	Aspyr Media		First-person shooter	Commercial—digital download	10.5.8-10.8.2
The Price Is Right	Ludia	2009	Game Show	Commercial	10.4+
Prime Target	WizardWorks Software	1996	First-person shooter	Commercial	7.1.2–9
Prince of Persia (1989)					
Prince of Persia (2008)	UbiSoft			Commercial	10.5.6+
Prince of Persia 2: The Shadow and the Flame					
Prince of Persia: The Lost Crown	Ubisoft	2024	Action-adventure	Commercial	12.0+ (M1+)
Prince of Persia: The Two Thrones					
The Princess Bride Game					
Princess Isabella: A Witch's Curse					
Pro Pinball: Big Race USA	Cunning Developments	1998	Pinball	Commercial	
Pro Pinball: Fantastic Journey	Cunning Developments	2000	Pinball	Commercial	
Pro Pinball: The Web	Entertainment International (UK)	1996	Pinball	Commercial	7-9
Pro Pinball: Timeshock!	Cunning Developments	1998	Pinball	Commercial	
Professor Fizzwizzle and the Molten Mystery					
Profitville					
Project Nomads					
ProximityMines					
Psarakia					
Psychonauts	Double Fine	2011	Platform	Commercial	10.6.8+
PULSAR: Lost Colony	Leafy Games	2021	First-person shooter	Commercial	10.7+
PunkTrader					
Pure Hidden					
Putt-Putt Enters the Race	Humongous	1998	Children	Commercial	7.1+
Putt-Putt Goes to the Moon	Humongous	1995	Children	Commercial	
Putt-Putt Joins the Circus	Humongous	2000	Children	Commercial	7.5.3+
Putt-Putt Joins the Parade	Humongous	1995	Children	Commercial	7.0+
Putt-Putt Saves the Zoo	Humongous	1995	Children	Commercial	7.0+
Putt Putt Travels Through Time	Humongous	1997	Children	Commercial	7.0+
Puzzle Dimension	Doctor Entertainment	2010	Puzzle	Commercial	10.3+
Puyo Pop Fever	Sega	2004	Puzzle	Commercial	10.2.8-10.6.8
Puzzle Quest: Challenge of the Warlords					
PuzzleMaze					
Puzzler World	Team3 Games/Feral Interactive	2011	Puzzle	Commercial	
Puzzles Forever					
Pyst					

== Q ==
Title	Developer/publisher	Release date	Genre	License	Mac OS versions
Q*bert					
Qbix					
QuackMan	David Shelley	1999	Action	Commercial	7.0 - 7.6 - 9
Quagmire	Tony Small		Platform	Shareware	System 7
Quake	ID Software		First person shooter	Commercial	7.6–9.2.2; OS X
Quake 4	Aspyr Media		First person shooter	Commercial	10.5.8–10.8.x
Quake II	ID Software		First person shooter	Commercial	8.1–9.2.2; OS X
Quake III Arena	ID Software		First person shooter	Commercial	8.1–9.2.2; OS X
Quantum					
QuantZ	Gamerizon Studio	2009	Puzzle	Commercial	10.4+
Quest for Camelot: Dragon Games	Knowledge Adventure	1998	Action/Adventure	Commercial	7.5.1+
Quest for Glory I: So you want to be a Hero?	Sierra	1992	RPG	Commercial	2+
Quest for Glory V: Dragon Fire	Yosemite Entertainment	1998	RPG	Commercial	7–9
Questionable					
Qwak					
Quinn					

== R ==
Title	Developer/publisher	Release date	Genre	License	Mac OS versions
The Race	Gogii Games	2008	Hidden object	Commercial	10.3.9+
Race Gear-Feel 3D Car Racing Fun & Drive Safe	Sulaba Inc	2011	Racing	Commercial	10.6.6+
Race Driver: GRID	Feral Interactive	2013	Racing	Commercial	1.7.5+
Racing Days R	Takumi Abe/Feral Interactive	1998	Racing	Commercial	7.1–9
Radical Castle	Silicon Beach Software	1986	Adventure	Shareware	
Ragdoll Masters					
Sid Meier's Railroads!	Feral Interactive	2012	Simulation/strategy	Commercial	
Sid Meier's Railroad Tycoon	Micro Prose	1992	Simulation	Commercial	
Railroad Tycoon 3		2003			
Rainbow Mystery					
Tom Clancy's Rainbow Six	MacSoft		First Person Strategy Shooter	Commercial	8.1-9.2.2
Tom Clancy's Rainbow Six: Rogue Spear	MacSoft		First Person Strategy Shooter	Commercial	8.1-9.2.2
Tom Clancy's Rainbow Six 3: Raven Shield	Aspyr Media		First Person Strategy Shooter	Commercial	
Tom Clancy's Rainbow Six 3: Athena Sword Expansion	Aspyr Media		First Person Strategy Shooter	Commercial	
Rainbow Web					
Rally Shift					
Ranch Rush					
Random Factor Mahjong					
Rangy Lil's Wild West Adventure					
Ratatouille					
Rayman 3: Hoodlum Havoc	Zonic Limited/Feral Interactive	2004	Action/adventure	Commercial	
Rayman Raving Rabbids					
Ray's Maze	Ray Dunakin	1990	Adventure	Shareware	
Rayman Origins	Feral Interactive	2013	Platform	Commercial	
Reader Rabbit	The Learning Company	1987	Educational	Commercial	
Reader Rabbit 1	The Learning Company	1994			6.x–9
Reader Rabbit: 1st Grade	The Learning Company	1998	Educational	Commercial	
Reader Rabbit 1st Grade: Capers on Cloud Nine	The Learning Company	2001	Educational	Commercial	8.5–8.6, OS X
Reader Rabbit 2	The Learning Company		Educational	Commercial	
Reader Rabbit 2nd Grade	The Learning Company	1997	Educational	Commercial	7.0–7.6–9
Reader Rabbit 2nd Grade: Mis-cheese-ious Dreamship Adventure	The Learning Company	2001	Educational	Commercial	
Reader Rabbit 3	The Learning Company	1996	Educational	Commercial	7.0–7.6–9
Reader Rabbit and Friends: Let's Start Learning!	The Learning Company	1995	Educational	Commercial	7.0–7.6–9
Reader Rabbit: Bounce Down in Balloon Town	The Learning Company	2001	Educational	Commercial	8.5–8.6–9
Reader Rabbit Dreamship Tales	The Learning Company	2002	Educational	Commercial	8.5–8.6–9
Reader Rabbit Playtime for Baby	The Learning Company	1999	Educational	Commercial	
Reader Rabbit Preschool	The Learning Company	1997	Educational	Commercial	
Reader Rabbit Preschool: Sparkle Star Rescue	The Learning Company	2001	Educational	Commercial	
Reader Rabbit Presents: Math Journey for Grades 1-3	The Learning Company	1996	Educational	Commercial	
Reader Rabbit Thinking Adventures Ages 4–6	The Learning Company	1999	Educational	Commercial	
Reader Rabbit Toddler	The Learning Company	1997	Educational	Commercial	7.0–7.6–9
Reader Rabbit's Interactive Reading Journey 1	The Learning Company	1993	Educational	Commercial	7.0–7.6–9
Reader Rabbit's Interactive Reading Journey 2	The Learning Company	1994	Educational	Commercial	
Reader Rabbit's Interactive Reading Journey For Grades K-1	The Learning Company	1998	Educational	Commercial	
Reader Rabbit's Interactive Reading Journey For Grades 1-2	The Learning Company	1998	Educational	Commercial	
Reader Rabbit's Interactive Reading Journey For Grades 1-3	The Learning Company	1998	Educational	Commercial	
Reader Rabbit's Kindergarten	The Learning Company	1997	Educational	Commercial	7.0–7.6–9
Reader Rabbit's Learn to Read with Phonics 1st & 2nd Grade	The Learning Company	1999	Educational	Commercial	
Reader Rabbit's Learn to Read with Phonics: Preschool & Kindergarten	The Learning Company	1999	Educational	Commercial	
Reader Rabbit's Math 1	The Learning Company	1997	Educational	Commercial	
Reader Rabbit's Math 2	The Learning Company	1998	Educational	Commercial	
Reader Rabbit's Math Ages 4-6	The Learning Company	1999	Educational	Commercial	7.0–7.6, 8.0–8.1
Reader Rabbit's Math Ages 6-9	The Learning Company	1999	Educational	Commercial	7.0–7.6–9
Reader Rabbit's Reading 1	The Learning Company	1997	Educational	Commercial	
Reader Rabbit's Reading 2	The Learning Company	1998	Educational	Commercial	
Reader Rabbit's Reading Ages 4–6	The Learning Company	1999	Educational	Commercial	
Reader Rabbit's Reading Ages 6-9	The Learning Company	1999	Educational	Commercial	
Reader Rabbit's Reading Development Library 1	The Learning Company	1994	Educational	Commercial	7.0–7.6–9
Reader Rabbit's Reading Development Library 2	The Learning Company	1995	Educational	Commercial	7.0–7.6–9
Reader Rabbit's Reading Development Library 3	The Learning Company	1995	Educational	Commercial	7.0–7.6–9
Reader Rabbit's Reading Development Library 4	The Learning Company	1995	Educational	Commercial	7.0–7.6–9
Reader Rabbit's Ready for Letters	The Learning Company	1993	Educational	Commercial	6.x–7.0–7.6
ReadingMaze	Great Wave Software	1991	Educational		
Real Ball II					
Real Estate Empire					
Realmz	Fantasoft	1994	RPG	Shareware	
Reassembly	Arthur Danskin/Anisoptera Games	2015	Open world, strategy, shooter, simulation	Commercial	
Reckless Drivin'	Jonas Echterhoff	2000	Vehicle combat	Freeware	8.1–9.2.2, 10.1–10.5
Recyclorama					
Red Baron (1990 video game)	Dynamix	1992	Flight simulator	Commercial	6.0.x–7
Red Crucible	Rocketeer Games Studio	2010	First-person shooter	Commercial	10.6.6+
Red Eclipse	Red Eclipse Team	2011	First-person shooter	Open source	10.1.4+
Red Faction	GraphSim Entertainment (THQ)		First-person shooter	Commercial	8.6–9.2.2; Carbon version made
Red Stars, White Nights	SJP Enterprises	1987	Turn-Based Strategy	Commercial	1.0 to 6.0
Redjack: Revenge of the Brethren					
Redline					
Redline Racing	Julien Mairat/Julien Dupays	2013	Racing	freeware	OS X
Redneck Rampage		1999			
Reel Deal Card games					
Reel Deal Casino High Roller					
Reel Deal Slots Mystic Forest					
Regnum Online	NGD Studios	2011	MMORPG	Freeware	10.5+
Relic Hunt					
Remington: Top Shot	Head Games/Logicware	1998	Shooter	Commercial	7.5.3+
Republic: The Revolution	Feral Interactive	2004	Political Strategy	Commercial	
Restoring Rhonda					
Return of the Incredible Machine: Contraptions	Sierra	2000	Puzzle/physics	Commercial	8.5.1–9
Return to Castle Wolfenstein	Aspyr Media		First-person shooter	Commercial	10.2-10.6.8
Return to Dark Castle	Z Sculpt Entertainment	2008	Platform	Commercial	10.3.9+
Return to Mysterious Island	Kheops Studio	2009	Adventure	Commercial	10.4+
Return to Mysterious Island 2	Kheops Studio	2010	Adventure	Commercial	10.4+
Return to Zork	Activision	1993	Adventure	Commercial	7.0
Revenge of the Titans					
Rex Nebular and the Cosmic Gender Bender	MicroProse	1993	Adventure	Commercial	6.x, 7.0-7.6
RHEM	Knut Müller	2002	Adventure	Commercial	8.5.1–9.2.2, 10.2.8
RHEM 2: The Cave	Knut Müller	2005	Adventure	Commercial	9.x, 10.2.8+
RHEM 3: The Secret Library	Knut Müller	2007	Adventure	Commercial	10.2.8+
RHEM 4: The Golden Fragments	Knut Müller	2010	Adventure	Commercial	10.4+
Ricochet Infinity					
Ricochet Lost Worlds					
Riddle School					
Riddle School 2					
Righteous Kill					
Rigs of Rods	(Open Project)	2008	Vehicle Simulator	Open source	10.4+
The Rise of Atlantis	Playrix	2008	Puzzle	Commercial	10.4+
Rise of Industry	Dapper Penguin Studios, Kasedo Games	2019	Business simulation	Commercial	10.14+
Rise of Nations					
Rise of Nations: Gold Edition	MacSoft		Strategy	Commercial	10.2-10.6.8
Riven	UbiSoft	1997	Puzzle	Commercial	7.5+
River Raider					
River Raider: Retaliation					
Robin Hood: The Legend of Sherwood	Freeverse	2004	Strategy	Commercial	10.2-10.6.8
RoboCop: Rogue City	Teyon/Nacon	2025	First-person shooter	Commercial	14.0+ (M1+)
RoboSport					
Robot Battle					
Robot Rover					
Rock'N'Roll Dice Roller					
Rock Solid	Richard White	1998	Puzzle	?	7.0 - 7.6 - 9.0
Rocket Golf					
Rogue					
RollerCoaster Tycoon 3					
RollerCoaster Tycoon 3: Soaked!					
Roller Dicer					
Rollster					
Romance Of Rome					
Rome: Total War - Gold Edition	Feral Interactive	2010	Strategy/War	Commercial	10.5.8+
Romi					
Rooms: The Main Building					
Rotoadventures					
Royal Trouble	Orchid Games	2010	Adventure	Commercial	10.4.11+
Rubber Ninjas					
Rugby Nations 2010	Distinctive Developments	2011	Sports	Commercial	10.6.6+
Rune					
Runes of Avalon					
Runic					
Ryzom	Nevrax	2011	MMORPG	Freeware	10.6.6+
Resident Evil 2	Capcom	2024	Survival horror	Commercial	13.0+ (M1+)
Resident Evil 3	Capcom	2025	Survival horror	Commercial	13.0+ (M1+)
Resident Evil 4	Capcom	2023	Survival horror	Commercial	13.0+ (M1+)
Resident Evil 7: Biohazard	Capcom	2024	Survival horror	Commercial	13.0+ (M1+)
Resident Evil Village	Capcom	2022	Survival horror	Commercial	12.0+ (M1+)

== S ==
Title	Developer/publisher	Release date	Genre	License	Mac OS versions
Sacrifice	MacPlay	2001	Real-time strategy	Commercial	9.2
Safari Sketch help with info					
Safecracker	DreamCatcher Interactive	1997	Action/Adventure	Commercial	7.5+
Sailboat Championship	Infinite Dreams	2011	Racing	Commercial	10.6.6+
Sally's Salon					
Sally's Quick Clips					
Sally's Spa					
Sam & Max: Beyond Time & Space - Episode 201	Telltale Games	2010	Adventure	Commercial	10.5+
Sam & Max: Beyond Time & Space - Episode 202	Telltale Games	2010	Adventure	Commercial	10.5+
Sam & Max: Beyond Time & Space - Episode 203	Telltale Games	2010	Adventure	Commercial	10.5+
Sam & Max: Beyond Time & Space - Episode 204	Telltale Games	2010	Adventure	Commercial	10.5+
Sam & Max: Beyond Time & Space - Episode 205	Telltale Games	2010	Adventure	Commercial	10.5+
Sam & Max: The Devil's Playhouse - Episode 301	Telltale Games	2010	Adventure	Commercial	10.5+
Sam & Max: The Devil's Playhouse - Episode 302	Telltale Games	2010	Adventure	Commercial	10.5+
Sam & Max: The Devil's Playhouse - Episode 303	Telltale Games	2010	Adventure	Commercial	10.5+
Sam & Max: The Devil's Playhouse - Episode 304	Telltale Games	2010	Adventure	Commercial	10.5+
Sam & Max: The Devil's Playhouse - Episode 305	Telltale Games	2010	Adventure	Commercial	10.5+
Sam & Max Hit the Road					
Sammy's Science House	Edmark	1994	Educational	Commercial	
Samorost 2					
Samurai II: Vengeance	Madfinger Games	2011	Action	Commercial	10.6+
Samurai Shodown V Special	SNK	2016	Fighting	Commercial	10.7+
San Diego Zoo Presents: The Animals!	Arnowitz Studios	1992	Educational	Commercial	7.0 - 7.6 or 9.0
Santa's Super Friends					
Santa In The Valley Of Gifts	Ashish Verma	2013	Action	Commercial	10.6+
Saqqarah					
Sargon 4	Spinnaker Software	1988	Strategy	Commercial	
Sargon V: World Class Chess	Activision	1995	Strategy	Commercial	6.07+
Saturn Fighter Wing – Red Zone					
Sauerbraten					
Savage: The Battle for Newerth					
Savage 2: A Tortured Soul					
Scarab of Ra					
Schmoozer	Michael J. Bruno	1988	Adventure	Commercial	
Science Girls!					
Scoop					
Scopa					
Scrabble					
SCRABBLE Journey					
Scrabble Plus					
Scrambled					
Scrapbook Paige					
Screen Studio	Feral Interactive			Commercial	
The Scruffs	Sweet Tooth Games	2008	Hidden object	Commercial	10.3.9+
ScrumbleShip	OrangeHat Tech LLC	2012	Space flight simulator	Commercial	10.7+
Seastalker					
Second Life					
Second Life Notifier					
Secret Maryo Chronicles	SMC Team	2008	Platform	Freeware	10.5+
The Secret of Monkey Island	Lucasfilm Games	1992	Adventure	Commercial	7–9
The Secret of Monkey Island: Special Edition	LucasArts	2010	Adventure	Commercial	10.5+
Secret of the Lost Cavern	Kheops Studio	2008	Adventure	Commercial	10.4+
Secret of the Magic Crystals	Artery Studios	2010	Simulation/sports	Commercial	10.5+
The Secrets of Da Vinci	Kheops Studio	2009	Adventure	Commercial	10.5+
SEGA Superstars Tennis	Open Planet Software/Feral Interactive	2013	Tennis	Commercial	
Senet					
Sensory Overload	Reality Bytes	1994	First-person shooter	Commercial	
Sequoia					
The Serpent of Isis	Gamgo Games	2009	Hidden object	Commercial	10.4+
The Settlers 7: Paths to a Kingdom	Blue Byte	2010	City-building/strategy	Commercial	10.6.3+
The Settlers II					
The Seven Cities of Gold					
Shaaft					
Shadow Era	Wulven Game Studios	2011	Card game/strategy	Freeware	10.6.5+
Shadow Warrior					
Shadow Wraith	Terminal Sunset	1995	Action	Commercial	
Shadowbane	Wolfpack Studios	2003	MMORPG	Commercial	10.2–10.5
Shadowbane: The Rise of Chaos	Wolfpack Studios	2003	MMORPG	Commercial	10.2–10.5
Shadowbane: Throne of Oblivion	Wolfpack Studios	2004	MMORPG	Commercial	10.2–10.5
Shadowgate					
Shadowgrounds	Frozenbyte	2011	Action	Commercial	10.6.5+
Shadowgrounds Survivor	Frozenbyte	2011	Action	Commercial	10.6.5+
Shadow Keep	Glenn Seemann	1991	RPG	Shareware	
Shaman Odyssey - Tropic Adventure	Cateia Games	2011	City-building/simulation	Commercial	10.6.6+
Shattered Steel					
Shaun White Snowboarding					
Sheep	Feral Interactive	2001	Family	Commercial	
Shogo: Mobile Armor Division					
Shooter In The Abstract					
Shooting Gallery					
Shrek 2					
Shufflepuck	Julian Meinold	2011	Sports	Commercial	10.6.6+
Shufflepuck Café	Christopher Gross, Genes Portwood, Lauren Elliott	1989	Sports		
SimAnt	Maxis	1991	Simulation	Commercial	6.0.2-9.2.2
Sigma Chess HIARCS					
SimCity 2000	Maxis	1993	City-building	Commercial	7-9.2.2
SimCity 3000	Maxis	1999	City-building	Commercial	9+
SimCity 4	Maxis/Aspyr Media	2003	City-building	Commercial	10.2+
SimCity	Maxis/Aspyr Media	2013	City-building	Commercial	10.7+
SimEarth	Maxis	1990	Simulation	Commercial	6-9.2.2
SimFarm	Maxis	1994	Simulation	Commercial	7-9.2.2
SimLife	Maxis	1992	Simulation	Commercial	6.0.2-9.2.2
The Simpsons Cartoon Studio	Big Top Productions	1996	Simulation	Commercial	7.5
The Simpsons: Virtual Springfield	Digital Evolution	1997	Adventure	Commercial	7.6
The Sims	Aspyr Media	2000	Life Simulation	Commercial	
The Sims 2	Aspyr Media	2005	Life Simulation	Commercial	
The Sims 3	Aspyr Media	2009	Life Simulation	Commercial	10.5+
The Sims Medieval	Maxis Redwood Shores, Electronic Arts	2011	Life Simulation	Commercial	10.5-10.14
The Sims 4	Maxis, Electronic Arts	2014	Life Simulation	Freeware	10.7.5+
Simon the Sorcerer II					
Simply Solitaire					
SimSafari					
SingSong Karaoke					
Sim Theme Park/World	Zonic Limited/Feral Interactive	2000	Simulation/strategy	Commercial	
SimTower	Maxis	1994	Construction Simulation	Commercial	6-9.2.2
SimTown	Maxis	1995	City-building	Commercial	6-9.2.2
Sin					
SketchFighter 4000 Alpha					
SKIP-BO Castaway Caper					
SkyFighters 1918					
Skyfox					
Sky Shadow	Patrick Buckland/MacSoft	1990	Action	Commercial	6+
Slater & Charlie Go Camping	Sierra	1993	Educational	Commercial	
Slide & Stack					
Slide Colors					
Slope Rider	Monte Boyd Interactive	2002	Sports		9+
Slots	Masque Publishing	1999	Gambling		
Slots of Fun					
Smart Educational Games					
Smashing Tennis					
Smile: The Splattering	Gregory Katsoulis	1995	Point & Click/Simulation	Commercial	7.5
Snake Deluxe II					
Sniper Elite 4	Rebellion Developments	2025	Tactical shooter	Commercial	14.0+ (M1+)
Snood	Snood, LLC	1996	Puzzle		
Snood Solitaire					
Snooker					
The Snowmen and the Crown	RAMDreams	2007	Adventure	Freeware	10.3+
Solarian II	Ben Haller (Stick Software)	1989	Action	Shareware	7 to 9, 10.3 to 10.5
Solavant Solitaire					
Solace					
Sol Basics Solitaire					
Soldier of Fortune II: Double Helix	Raven Software	2002	First-person shooter	Commercial	10.1.4
Solitaire Epic					
Solitaire Forever					
Solitaire Greatest Hits					
Solitaire Plus!					
Solitaire XL	Lavacat Software	2005	Card game	Freeware	10.3+
Something Special					
Sonic & Sega All-Stars Racing	Open Planet Software/Feral Interactive	2013	Racing	Commercial	
Sorceress Solitaire					
Soulless	Cobra Blade	2008	Platform/shooter	Commercial	10.4+
Souls in the System	Terminal Sunset	1996	Action	Commercial	7-9
Spa Mania					
Space Academy GX-1	Edmark	2000	Educational	Commercial	
Space Colony					
Space Falcon Reloaded	Rapid Turtle Games	2011	Top-down shooter	Commercial	10.6.6+
Space Hulk	Full Control	2013	Turn-based tactics	Commercial	10.6+
Space Hulk: Ascension	Full Control	2014	Turn-based tactics	Commercial	10.6+
Space Madness	Changeling	1995	Action/Adventure	Commercial	6.0.7+
Space Prisoner					
Space Trader	HermitWorks Entertainment	2007	First-person shooter/strategy	Commercial	10.3.9+
SpacePig					
Spacestation Pheta					
Spaceward Ho!					
Spandex Force					
Sparkle					
Spectre	Peninsula Gameworks	1991	Vehicle combat	Commercial	6.0.3–9
Spectre Supreme	Green Dragon Creations	1993	Vehicle combat	Commercial	6.0.3–9
Spectre VR	Green Dragon Creations	1994	Simulation	Commercial	6.0.7–9
SpellbookMaster					
Spelunx					
Spider-Man	Aspyr Media	2000		Commercial	OSX
Spider-Man 2					
Spinnn					
Spiral Knights	Three Rings	2011	MMORPG	Freeware	10.5.8, 10.6.3+
Spirited Heart					
StarFlyers: Alien Space Chase	The Learning Company	2002	Educational	Commercial	8.5, 8.6 or Mac OS X
StarFlyers: Royal Jewel Rescue	The Learning Company	2002	Educational	Commercial	8.5, 8.6 or Mac OS X
Tom Clancy's Splinter Cell	Aspyr Media				
Tom Clancy's Splinter Cell: Conviction	Ubisoft	2011	Action	Commercial	10.6+
SpongeBob Diner Dash					
Spore					
Spore Creature Creator					
Spring Adventure					
Spring Up!					
Sprouts Adventure					
Spyde Solitaire					
Spy Fox in Cheese Chase	Infogrames	1998	Adventure	Commercial	7.0+
Spy Fox in "Dry Cereal"	Humongous	1997	Adventure	Freeware	
Spy Fox 2: "Some Assembly Required"	Humongous	1999	Adventure	Freeware	
Spy Fox 3: "Operation Ozone"	Humongous	2001	Adventure	Freeware	
Star Trek: The Game Show	Sound Source Interactive	1998	Quiz	Commercial	7.1+
Star Hammer: The Vanguard Prophecy	Black Lab Games/Slitherine Software	2015	Strategy	Commercial	10.6+
Spy Hunter	Aspyr Media	2003	Driving Simulation	Commercial	10.2–10.4
Spy Kids: Mega Mission Zone	Troublemaker Studios	2002	Action/Adventure	Commercial	8.6-9.2.x and 10.0.4+
Stack'n'Splash					
Star Chamber: The Harbinger Saga					
Star Defender					
Star Trek: 25th Anniversary	Interplay	1993	Adventure	Commercial	6.0.7–9
Star Trek: Borg					
Star Trek: D-A-C	Naked Sky Entertainment	2009	Action	Commercial	10.5.8+
Star Trek: Deep Space Nine: The Fallen					
Star Trek: Judgment Rites					
Star Trek: The Kobayashi Alternative					
Star Trek: The Next Generation – A Final Unity					
Star Trek: The Next Generation: Klingon Honor Guard					
Star Trek: The Promethean Prophecy	TRANS Fiction Systems	1988	Interactive fiction	Commercial	1–6
Star Trek: Starfleet Academy					
Star Trek: Starfleet Command	14° East/Quicksilver Software	1999	Strategy	Commercial	8.6
Star Trek Voyager: Elite Force I	Aspyr Media		First person shooter	Commercial	8.6–9.2
Star Trek Voyager: Elite Force II	Aspyr Media		First person shooter	Commercial	10.2-10.6
Star Wars	Atari	1988	Shooter	Commercial	6
Star Wars: Anakin's Speedway	Lucas Learning	2000	Educational	Commercial	8–9
Star Wars: Battlefront	Aspyr Media		First person shooter	Commercial	10.4–10.6
Star Wars: Dark Forces	LucasArts	1995	First person shooter	Commercial	8.1–9.2
Star Wars: DroidWorks	Lucas Learning	1998	Educational/adventure	Commercial	7.5.5
Star Wars: Empire at War		2007			
Star Wars Episode I: Racer	LucasArts	1999	Racing	Commercial	8.6–9.2.2, 10.1–10.4
Star Wars: The Force Unleashed (Ultimate Sith Edition)	LucasArts	2010	Action	Commercial	10.5.8+
Star Wars: Galactic Battlegrounds	Aspyr Media	2002	Real-time strategy	Commercial	8.6–9.2.2, 10.1
Star Wars: Galactic Battlegrounds: Clone Campaigns	Aspyr Media	2002	Real-time strategy	Commercial	8.6–9.2.2, 10.1
Star Wars: The Gungan Frontier	Lucas Learning	1999	Educational/simulation/strategy	Commercial	7.6–9
Star Wars: Knights of the Old Republic		2004			
Star Wars: Jar Jar's Journey Adventure Book	Lucas Learning	1999	Educational	Commercial	7.6
Star Wars Jedi Knight: Jedi Academy	Aspyr Media	2003	First person shooter	commercial	10.2–10.8.x
Star Wars Jedi Knight II: Jedi Outcast	Aspyr Media	2002	First person shooter	commercial	10.2–10.8.x
Star Wars Math: Jabba's Game Galaxy	Lucas Learning	2000	Educational	Commercial	7.6
Star Wars: Pit Droids	Lucas Learning	2000	Educational/arcade	Commercial	7.6–9
Star Wars: Rebel Assault		1993			
Star Wars: Rebel Assault II: The Hidden Empire		1995			
Star Wars: TIE Fighter					7.6–9.2.1
Star Wars: X-Wing					7.6–9.2.1
Star Wars: Yoda's Challenge	Lucas Learning	1999	Educational	Commercial	7.6
StarCraft	Blizzard	1999	Real-time strategy	Commercial	8.6–9.2.1–10.3.9 and higher (on Intel-based Macs; level editor not Intel-compatible)
StarCraft: Brood War	Blizzard	1999	Real-time strategy	Commercial	8.6–9.2.1–10.3.9 and higher (on Intel-based Macs; level editor not Intel-compatible)
StarCraft II: Wings of Liberty	Blizzard	2010	Real-time strategy	Commercial	10.5.8, 10.6.2 or newer
StarCraft II: Heart of the Swarm	Blizzard	2012	Real-time strategy	Commercial	10.5.8, 10.6.2 or newer
Starcross					
Starfall	Digital Concepts	2011	Strategy	Commercial	10.6.6+
Starfront: Collision	Gameloft	2011	Real-time strategy	Commercial	10.6.6+
Stationfall					
Stay Tooned!	Funnybone Interactive	1996	Action-adventure		
SteamTRAIN					
Steel Storm: Burning Retribution	Kot-in-Action Creative Artel	2011	Action	Commercial	10.5+
Steel Storm: Episode I	Kot-in-Action Creative Artel	2010	Action	Freeware	10.5+
Stella Obscura	John Calhoun	1990	Action	"emailware"	6-9
Stellar 7					
StepMania					
Stereodrome (unfinished but works)	John Calhoun	1994	Action	freeware	
Steve The Sheriff					
Still Life 2	Game Consulting	2009	Adventure	Commercial	10.4+
Stimuli Cards					
StoneLoops! of Jurassica					
Strange Adventures in Infinite Space					
Strategic Conquest					
Stray	BlueTwelve Studio	2023	Adventure	Commercial	12.0+ (M1+)
The Strix - Tales from the Dragon Mountain	Cateia Games	2011	Adventure	Commercial	10.4+
Strong Bad's Cool Game for Attractive People: Episode 1	Telltale Games	2011	Adventure	Commercial	10.5+
Strong Bad's Cool Game for Attractive People: Episode 2	Telltale Games	2011	Adventure	Commercial	10.5+
Strong Bad's Cool Game for Attractive People: Episode 3	Telltale Games	2011	Adventure	Commercial	10.5+
Strong Bad's Cool Game for Attractive People: Episode 4	Telltale Games	2011	Adventure	Commercial	10.5+
Strong Bad's Cool Game for Attractive People: Episode 5	Telltale Games	2011	Adventure	Commercial	10.5+
Stronghold	Firefly Studios	2001	Real-time strategy	Commercial	10.6.8+
Stubbs the Zombie in Rebel Without a Pulse					
Stunt Copter	Duane Blehm		Action	Shareware	
StuntMANIA	Sector3 Games	2007	Racing	Shareware	10.3.9+
StuntMANIA Reloaded	Sector3 Games	2010	Racing	Shareware	10.4.5+
Styrateg					
Styx					
Sudoku - Latin Squares					
Sudoku Epic					
Sudoku Solver					
SudokuAdept					
Sultan's Palace	Louise "Lucy" Hope	1997	Adventure	Shareware	
Summer Session					
Summoner	Volition	2001	Action RPG/adventure	Commercial	8.6
Sun Blast					
Sunday Search					
Sunken Words					
Sunset Studio Deluxe					
Sunset Studio: Love on the High Seas					
Super Animal Royale	Pixile Studios	2021	Battle royale	Commercial	10.9+
Super Collapse!					
Super Gerball					
Super Jigsaw Puzzles					
Super Laser Racer					
Super Mega Blackjack Supreme					
Super Mega Sudoku					
Super Munchers					
Supercow					
Supernova 2: Spacewar					
SuperTux					
SuperTuxKart					
Super Wing Commander	Electronic Arts	1994	Space flight simulator	Commercial	7.0.0–9.2.2
Supreme Commander 2	Gas Powered Games	2010	Real-time strategy	Commercial	10.6.3+
Sushi To Go Express					
Suspended					
Suspects and Clues					
Swamp Gas Visits the United States of America		1990	Educational game		
Swarm Gold					
Swarm: Gold Edition					
Swoop					
Symbolical					
Syndicate	Bullfrog Productions	1994	Strategy	Commercial	7.5
System Protocol One	While True Fork	2010	Action	Commercial	10.5.8+
System Shock					
System's Twilight					

== T ==
Title	Developer/publisher	Release date	Genre	License	Mac OS versions
Table Tennis Pro					
A Tale in the Desert	eGenesis	2010	MMORPG	Commercial	
Tales of Monkey Island: Chapter 1	Telltale Games	2010	Adventure	Commercial	10.5+
Tales of Monkey Island: Chapter 2	Telltale Games	2010	Adventure	Commercial	10.5+
Tales of Monkey Island: Chapter 3	Telltale Games	2010	Adventure	Commercial	10.5+
Tales of Monkey Island: Chapter 4	Telltale Games	2010	Adventure	Commercial	10.5+
Tales of Monkey Island: Chapter 5	Telltale Games	2010	Adventure	Commercial	10.5+
TaMiGoN					
Tanaka	Pacific Media WorX	1999	Vehicle combat	Commercial	7.5–9
Tangle					
TaskMaker	Storm Impact	1993	RPG	Freeware	7.0–8.1
Tavern Talk	Gentle Troll Entertainment	2024	Visual novel	Commercial	10.13+
Team Fortress 2	Valve	2007	First-person shooter	Commercial	10.5.8+
Tempest 2000					
Temple of Apshai					
Tennis Elbow 2009					
Tennis Elbow Manager					
Terminal Velocity	Terminal Reality	1996	Action	Commercial	7–9
Tetris	Spectrum HoloByte	1988	Puzzle	Commercial	
Tetris Zone					
TextTwist					
Theldrow					
The Three Musketeers: The Game	Dingo Games	2009	Adventure/RPG	Commercial	10.3.9+
The Tuttles Madcap Misadventures	Legacy Interactive	2008	Platform	Commercial	10.4.10+
Theseus and the Minotaur					
Thief Simulator	Noble Muffins	2018	Simulation/strategy	Commercial	
Thieves in the City					
Theme Park					
Thexder					
ThinkTanks					
Thoroughbred Derby					
Through the Looking Glass					
Tico					
Tiger Woods '99					
Tiger Woods PGA Tour 08					
Tiger Woods PGA Tour 2005					
Tiki Magic Mini Golf					
TikiBar					
Tilt2Joystick					
Time Crisis 2nd Strike	Namco Bandai	2011	Rail shooter	Commercial	10.6.6+
The Tinies	Inline Design	1992	Puzzle	Commercial	6.0.6+
Titan Attacks					
Titanic: Adventure Out of Time					
Race Driver 3	Feral Interactive	2008	Racing	Commercial	10.4.8+
Tomb of the TaskMaker	Storm Impact	1997	RPG	Freeware	7.0–8.1
Tomb Raider	Feral Interactive	2014	Action/adventure	Commercial	
Tomb Raider II					
Tomb Raider III: Adventures of Lara Croft	Core Design	1999	Action/adventure	Commercial	8.6
Tomb Raider: The Angel of Darkness					
Tomb Raider: Anniversary	Robosoft Technologies/Feral Interactive	2008	Action/adventure	Commercial	
Tomb Raider: Chronicles					
Tomb Raider: The Last Revelation	Core Design	2000	Action/adventure	Commercial	8.6
Tomb Raider: Underworld	Feral Interactive	2012	Action/adventure	Commercial	
Tomb Rumble	Atelier 801	2021	Platform	Commercial	
Tommy and the Magical Words					
Tongits					
Tonka Construction	Hasbro Interactive	1996	Simulation	Commercial	7.1+
Tony Hawk's Pro Skater 2					
Tony Hawk's Pro Skater 3					
Tony Hawk's Pro Skater 4					
Top Chef					
Toontown Online					
Torchlight					
Total Annihilation					
Total Immersion Racing	Zonic Limited/Feral Interactive	2003	Motor racing	Commercial	
Total War: Shogun 2	Feral Interactive	2014	Real-time strategy	Commercial	
Total War: Shogun 2: Fall of the Samurai	Feral Interactive	2014	Real-time strategy	Commercial	
Tourist Trap					
The Tower	Louise "Lucy" Hope	1997	Adventure	Shareware	
Toy Story 2: Buzz Lightyear to the Rescue	Traveller's Tales	2000	Action	Commercial	8.1
Toy Story 3: The Video Game	Avalanche Software	2010	Action	Commercial	10.5.8+
Toysight Gold					
Toxic Ravine					
Tradewinds Caravans					
Tradewinds Legends					
Trainz Simulator Mac	Auran Games	2011	Simulation	Commercial	10.5+
Traitors Gate	Daydream Software/DreamCatcher Interactive	1999	Adventure	Commercial	7.5+
TraktorSim	Kuhbuckel Studios	2011	Simulation/racing	Commercial	10.4+
Tranquil Checkers					
tranquility					
Transarctica					
Transformice	Atelier 801	2010	Massively multiplayer online, platform	Commercial	
Transylvania					
Travelogue 360 Paris					
Tremulous					
Trenches: Generals	Thunder Game Works	2011	Action/strategy	Commercial	10.6.6+
Trial of the Gods: Ariadne's Fate					
Tribal Trouble 2					
TriBond	Patch	1999	Puzzle	Commercial	
Trine	Frozenbyte	2010	Platform	Commercial	10.5.8, 10.6.4+
Trinity					
TripleA					
Tristan	Fujita	1991	Pinball	Shareware	7.5
Tron 2.0					
Trophy Truck Extreme	XmediaGrafx	2011	Racing	Commercial	10.6.6+
Tropico	Feral Interactive	2001	Simulation/strategy	Commercial	
Tropico 2: Pirate Cove					
Tropico 3: Gold Edition	Feral Interactive	2012	Simulation/strategy	Commercial	
Tropico 4: Gold Edition	Feral Interactive	2013	Simulation/strategy	Commercial	
Tropico 5	Kalypso Media	2014	Simulation/strategy	Commercial	
Tropico 6	Kalypso Media	2019	Simulation/strategy	Commercial	
Tropico Jong					
Troubled Souls					
Truck Jam	Invictus	2011	Racing	Commercial	10.6.6+
Trudy's Time and Place House	Edmark	1995	Educational	Commercial	
True Crime: Streets of LA					
Trump Castle: The Ultimate Casino Gambling Simulation		1989	Casino & Cards	Commercial	
Trump Castle II	Capstone	1992	Casino & Cards	Commercial	
TubeTwist					
Tunnel					
Turbo Subs					
Turret Wars MP	Sector3 Games	2008	Action	Commercial	10.4+
Turret Wars Retro					
Tux Paint					
Tux Racer					
TV Station Manager					
TwistAWord					
Two Worlds II	Reality Pump Studios	2011	Action RPG	Commercial	10.6.3+
Two Worlds II Castle Defense	Reality Pump Studios	2011	Action/strategy	Commercial	10.6.3+

== U ==
Title	Developer/publisher	Release date	Genre	License	Mac OS versions
Uberstrike	Cmune	2011	First-person shooter	Commercial	10.6.6+
UFO: Alien Invasion	UFO: Alien Invasion Team	2008	Strategy	Commercial	10.5.8+
U.F.O.s	Artech Digital Entertainment	1997	Adventure		
Ultima II					
Ultima III: Exodus					
Ultimate Doom					
Ultranium					
Ultratron					
Ultraviolet Dawn	Sad Cat Software	2011	Action	Commercial	10.6.6+
Unicycle					
Uninvited					
UniSudoku					
UnityStation	UnityStation Community	2020	RPG, Multiplayer	Open Source	
Universal Boxing Manager					
Universal Soccer Manager 2					
UNO Undercover					
Unreal	Epic MegaGames/MacSoft	1998	First-Person Shooter	Commercial	
Unreal Tournament					
Unreal Tournament 2003					
Unreal Tournament 2004					
The Untouchable	Creative Edge Studios	1998	Fighting	Commercial	7–9
Unwell Mel					
Uplink	Ambrosia Software	2003	Hacking simulation	Commercial	X
Urban Terror					
US Lacrosse					

== V ==
Title	Developer/publisher	Release date	Genre	License	Mac OS versions
Valheim	Iron Gate Studio/Coffee Stain Publishing	2024	Survival sandbox	Commercial	10.15+
A Vampyre Story					
Vampire: The Masquerade – Redemption					
vDrift	Joe Venzon	2005	Racing	Open source	10.4+
Vega					
Vegas Games	Presage Software; New World Computing, Inc.	1994	Card Games	Commercial	6.0.7+
Vendetta Online					
Venice Mystery					
Venture					
Venture Arctic	Pocketwatch Games	2008	Simulation	Commercial	10.3+
Vette!	Sphere/Spectrum HoloByte	1989	Racing	Commercial	6.0.4+
Veronica Rivers: Portals to the Unknown					
Victoria					
Victoria: Revolutions					
Virtual Families					
Virtual Forbidden City	Beyond Space and Time	2008	Simulation	Freeware	10.4.5
Virtual Villagers: A New Home					
Virtual Villagers: The Lost Children					
Virtual Villagers: The Secret City					
Voyna	Adam Buczek/Hell Yeah!	2022	Strategy	Commercial	10.15.7+
vSide	Doppelganger 2006-2009/ExitReality since 2009	2006	Social MMORLG	Freeware	10.4.10+

== W ==
Title	Developer/publisher	Release date	Genre	License	Mac OS versions
Wacky Mini Golf					
Walk of Fame					
WALL•E: The Video Game	Heavy Iron Studios	2008	Adventure	Commercial	OS X
Wandering Willows					
War Pinball HD	OOO Gameprom	2011	Pinball	Commercial	10.6.6+
Warbirds 2009					
Warblade	Edgar M. Vigdal		Action	Commercial	OS X
Warcraft: Orcs & Humans	Blizzard	1994	Real-time strategy	Commercial	7–9.2.2
Warcraft II: Battle.Net Edition	Blizzard		Real-time strategy	Commercial	7–9.2.2
Warcraft II: Beyond the Dark Portal	Blizzard		Real-time strategy	Commercial	7–9.2.2
Warcraft II: Tides of Darkness	Blizzard	1996	Real-time strategy	Commercial	7–9.2.2
Warcraft III: Reign of Chaos	Blizzard	2002	Real-time strategy	Commercial	9.0–10.1.3+
Warcraft III: The Frozen Throne	Blizzard	2003	Real-time strategy	Commercial	9.0–10.1.3+
Warhammer 40,000: Armageddon	Lordz Games Studio/Flashback Games/Slitherine Software	2014	Computer wargame	Commercial	10.8.5+
Warhammer 40,000: Mechanicus	Bulwark Studios/Kasedo Games	2018	Turn-based tactics	Commercial	10.9+
Warhammer Online: Age of Reckoning	Mythic Entertainment	2009	MMORPG	Commercial	10.5.7+
Warhammer Quest	Rodeo Games/Chilled Mouse	2015	Tactical role-playing	Commercial	10.6+
Warhammer Quest 2: The End Times	Perchang Games	2019	Tactical role-playing	Commercial	10.11+
Warlords	Strategic Studies Group	1992	Turn-based tactics	Commercial	
Warlords II	Strategic Studies Group	1994	Turn-based tactics	Commercial	
Warmux	Warmux Team	2007	Turn-based tactics	Freeware	10.4+
Warrior Kings	VP Virtual Programming/Feral Interactive	2003	Real-time strategy	Commercial	
Warsow	Warsow Team	2005	First-person shooter	Open source	10.5+
Warzone 2100	Pumpkin Studios	1999	Real-time strategy	Open source	10.4+
Waterloo Campaign	Design, Inc				
Waterscape Solitaire: American Falls					
Waterstorm					
Wedding Dash	ImaginEngine	2007	Time management	Commercial	OS X
Wedding Dash 2: Rings Around the World	ImaginEngine		Time management	Commercial	OS X
Wedding Dash: Ready, Aim, Love!	ImaginEngine		Time management	Commercial	OS X
Weekend Party: Fashion Show	Teyon	2009	Puzzle	Commercial	OS X
Weekend Warrior	Pangea Software	1996	Action	Freeware	7–9
Welltris	Spectrum HoloByte	1989	Puzzle	Commercial	3.0 or later
Wendy Wellness					
Westward II	Sandlot Games		Simulation	Commercial	OS X
Welcome to the Future	Blue Sky Entertainment				
Whack The Dead					
Wheel of Fortune Super Deluxe					
Where in the World Is Carmen Sandiego?	Broderbund	1985	Educational	Commercial	
Where in Space Is Carmen Sandiego?	Broderbund	1994	Educational	Commercial	
Where's Waldo: The Fantastic Journey	Ludia	2011	Hidden object	Commercial	10.6.6+
Whispers of a Machine	Clifftop Games/Raw Fury	2019	Adventure	Commercial	10.9+
Who Wants to Be a Millionaire	Feral Interactive	2002	Quiz	Commercial	
WidgetTD					
Wild Tribe					
Wild West Online: Gunfighter					
Wildlife Tycoon: Venture Africa	Pocketwatch Games	2006	Simulation	Commercial	10.2.8+
Winemaker Extraordinaire	Overplay	2009	Simulation	Commercial	10.4+
Wing Commander 3: Heart of the Tiger	Electronic Arts	1995	Space flight simulator	Commercial	8.1-9.2.2
Wing Commander 4: The Price of Freedom	Electronic Arts	1996	Space flight simulator	Commercial	7.1-9.2.2
WingNuts	Freeverse	2001	Shooter	Commercial	8.6–9.2.2, 10.1
WingNuts 2: Raina's Revenge	Freeverse	2006	Shooter	Commercial	10.4+
Wipeout 2097	Psygnosis	2002	Racing	Commercial	
Wishbringer	Infocom	1985	Interactive fiction	Commercial	
The Witness					
Wiz Solitaire					
Wolfenstein 3D	id Software	1994	First-person shooter	Open source	
Wolfenstein: Enemy Territory	Splash Damage	2005	First-person shooter	Freeware	10.1+
WolfQuest	Minnesota Zoo/Eduweb	2007	Educational/simulation	Freeware	10.3.9+
Women's Murder Club: Death in Scarlet					
The Wonderful Wizard of Oz	Big Fish Games	2008	Puzzle	Commercial	10.4+
Word Cross					
WordOMatic					
Wordtris	Realtime Associates	1991	Puzzle	Commercial	
Word War 5	Créalude	1995	Puzzle	Commercial	
World of Blackjack					
World of Goo	2D Boy	2008	Puzzle	Commercial	OS X
World of Padman	WOP Team	2007	First-person shooter	Freeware	10.1+
World of Warcraft	Blizzard	2004	MMORPG	Commercial	OS X
World of Warcraft: The Burning Crusade	Blizzard	2007	MMORPG	Commercial	OS X
World of Warcraft: Wrath of the Lich King	Blizzard	2008	MMORPG	Commercial	OS X
World of Warcraft: Cataclysm	Blizzard	2010	MMORPG	Commercial	OS X
World of Warcraft: Mists of Pandaria	Blizzard	2012	MMORPG	Commercial	OS X
World of Xeen	New World Computing	1993	RPG	Commercial	
World Mosaics 2					
World War II Online: Battleground Europe	Cornered Rat Software	2002	MMOFPS		OS X
Worms	Team17	1995	Turn-based tactics	Commercial	
Worms 3D	Team17/Feral Interactive	2004	Turn-based tactics	Commercial	OS X
Worms Blast	Team17/Feral Interactive	2003	Puzzle	Commercial	OS X
Worms Reloaded	Team17 Software	2011	Turn-based tactics	Commercial	10.6+
Worms Special Edition	Team17 Software	2011	Turn-based tactics	Commercial	10.6+
Wuthering Waves	Kuro Games	2025	RPG	Freeware	12.0+ (M1+)

== X ==
Title	Developer/publisher	Release date	Genre	License	Mac OS versions
X²: The Threat					
X³: Reunion					
X³: Terran Conflict	EGOSOFT	2009	Space combat/simulation	Commercial	10.5.7+
The X-Files Game	Fox Interactive	1998	Action/Adventure	Commercial	7.1+
X-Mas Lemmings	DMA Design	1992	Puzzle	Freeware	6.0.5–9
X-Moto					
X-Plane	Laminar Research	1993 – present	Simulation	Commercial, demo, full game	10.6
X2: Wolverine's Revenge	GenePool Software	2003	Action	Commercial	10.2.6
XCOM: Enemy Unknown - Elite Edition	Feral Interactive	2013	Action/strategy	Commercial	10.7.5+
XCOM: Enemy Within	Feral Interactive	2013	Action/strategy	Commercial	10.7.5+
XIII	Zonic Limited/Feral Interactive	2004	Action/adventure	Commercial	
XLarn	Swinfjord-Games	2011	Adventure	Commercial	10.6.6
Xonotic	Team Xonotic	2010-12-23	First-person shooter	Open source	
Xplorer					
Xyphus					

== Y ==
Title	Developer/publisher	Release date	Genre	License	Mac OS versions
Yahtzee Texas Hold'em					
Yam II - Return Of The Killer Potato	Jalada	2010	Action	Commercial	10.4.4+
Yard Sale Hidden Treasures: Sunnyville					
Yard Sale Junkie					
Ye Old Sandwich Shoppe					
YippyMac					
Yo Frankie!	Blender Institute	2008	Platform	Freeware	10.3+
Yohoho! Puzzle Pirates					
Yoot Tower (The Tower II in Japan)	OPeNBooK9003/Sega	1998	Construction Simulation	Commercial	7.0-9
Youda Farmer					
Youda Legend: The Curse of the Amsterdam Diamond					
Youda Marina					
Youda Rail of War					
Youda Skies of War					
Youda Sushi Chef					
You Don't Know Jack	Jellyvision/Berkeley Systems	1995	Party/trivia	Commercial	7–9
You Don't Know Jack: Louder! Faster! Funnier!	Jellyvision/Berkeley Systems	2000	Party/trivia	Commercial	9.0.4
You Don't Know Jack: Movies	Jellyvision/Berkeley Systems	1997	Party/trivia	Commercial	7.6
You Don't Know Jack: Offline	Jellyvision/Berkeley Systems	1999	Party/trivia	Commercial	8.6
You Don't Know Jack: Sports	Jellyvision/Berkeley Systems	1996	Party/trivia	Commercial	7.5
You Don't Know Jack: Television	Jellyvision/Berkeley Systems	1997	Party/trivia	Commercial	7.6
You Don't Know Jack: Volume 2	Jellyvision/Berkeley Systems	1996	Party/trivia	Commercial	7.5
You Don't Know Jack: Volume 3	Jellyvision/Berkeley Systems	1997	Party/trivia	Commercial	7.6
You Don't Know Jack: Volume 4 - The Ride	Jellyvision/Berkeley Systems	1998	Party/trivia	Commercial	8.1
Yu-gi-oh! Power of Chaos Trilogy					
Yule's Christmas Quest					

== Z ==
Title	Developer/publisher	Release date	Genre	License	Mac OS versions	
Z						
Zamby and the Mystical Crystals						
Zatikon						
Zen Bound 2	Secret Exit	2010	Puzzle/physics	Commercial	10.5.8+	
Zineth	Arcane Kids	2012	Action	Freeware		
Zen Of Clover 3D						
Zeus Quest						
Zoltan						
Zombie Crisis 3D	Kongzhong Corporation	2011	Rail shooter	Commercial	10.6.6+	
Zoombinis Island Odyssey	Broderbund/Feral Interactive	2003	Puzzle	Commercial		
Zone Raiders	Image Space	1995	Vehicle combat	Commercial	7.5	zonSudoku
Zoop						
Zoo Tycoon						
Zoo Tycoon 2						
Zork I	Infocom	1984	Interactive fiction	Commercial	1–7	
Zork II	Infocom	1984	Interactive fiction	Commercial	1–7	
Zork III	Infocom	1984	Interactive fiction	Commercial	1–7	
Zork: Grand Inquisitor	Activision	2001	Adventure	Commercial	8.6–9.2.2, 10.1–10.2	
Zork Nemesis: The Forbidden Lands	Activision	1996	Adventure	Commercial	7.5.1	
Zork: The Undiscovered Underground	Activision	1998	Interactive fiction	Freeware	7.6	
Zork Zero	Infocom	1988	Interactive fiction	Commercial	6	
ZPC	Zombie Studios	1996	First-person shooter	Commercial	8–9	
Zulu's Zoo						
Zuma						
Zuma's Revenge!						
Zurk's Rainforest Lab	Soleil Software	1994	Educational	Commercial	1.00	

== See also ==
- Mac gaming
- Lists of video games
- List of Macintosh software
