= MacHeist =

Mac software marketing website

- Website type: Macintosh software
- Owners: John Casasanta; Phillip Ryu; Scott Meinzer
- Creators: John Casasanta; Phillip Ryu; Scott Meinzer; Adam Betts
- Commercial: Yes
- Registration: Yes
- Launched: 2006
- Current status: Original defunct, 2016

MacHeist was a website that bundled and resold Mac OS X software. The site conducted marketing through challenges (or "heists") that allowed customers to win software licenses and/or discounts; and sold software in bundles that increased in size as more customers purchased the offer. The site was founded by John Casasanta, Phillip Ryu, and Scott Meinzer. After a final promotion in May 2016, the original incarnation went offline. As of November 2018, the website is a front-end for marketing by native advertising company StackCommerce.

== MacHeist ==
MacHeist I was a six-week-long event that the site ran at the end of 2006. It culminated with a week-long sale of a bundle of ten Mac OS X software applications for US$49. Prior to the sale, a number of challenges (or "heists") were posted on the MacHeist site. These challenges typically offered cryptic clues to Mac-related websites, where the answers could be found. Users who successfully completed the heists were rewarded a US$2 discount on the bundle for each heist completed, as well as free licensed copies of various Mac OS X software applications that were not included in the final bundle. This inaugural promotion sold more than 16,000 copies in one week.

The final bundle sold for US$49 and was available to any Mac user, regardless of participation in the heists leading up to the sale. It contained Delicious Library, FotoMagico, ShapeShifter, DEVONthink, Disco, Rapidweaver, iClip, Newsfire, TextMate, and the choice of one Pangea Software game (Bugdom 2, Enigmo 2, Nanosaur 2, Pangea Arcade). Newsfire was added to the bundle after the sale of approximately 4,000 bundles, and TextMate was added after approximately 5,600 bundles were sold. The other applications were available from the beginning of the sale. After the two later applications were unlocked, they became available for no extra charge to the initial purchasers of the bundle.

Following MacHeist I, a portion of the proceeds (US$200,000) were donated to charities. This amount was divided between the following charities: United Way International, Direct Relief, AIDS Research Alliance, Cancer Research and Prevention Foundation, Nature Conservancy, World Wildlife Fund, Hunger Project and Save the Children.

== MacHeist II ==
MacHeist II began in Nov. 2007 with the creation of a character named Malcor, a computer hacker with a grudge against "Apple fanbois." As a marketing stunt, the owners of a number of small Apple-related blogs were contacted by Philip Ryu and asked to participate in the lead-up to MacHeist II, by making their sites appear to have been hacked by Malcor. However, over the course of the stunt, many people in various communities became concerned they would be targeted or vulnerable.

- On November 16, 2007, glennwolsey.com was defaced for 24hrs with the image of a rotting apple. The site was hosted by Media Temple and ran on the WordPress blogging engine. Both Media Temple and the site designer were apparently unaware of the stunt, but it later became clear that it was a stunt and Glenn Wolsey had defaced the site himself.
- A few days later, the macapper.com site was defaced and the site owner, Miles Evans, wrote that the hack was due to a WordPress vulnerability. Evans later apologised for this, as many other WordPress users had been worried by this apparent vulnerability that did not really exist.
- Finally, applematters.com and iphonematters.com were defaced. In this case, however, their hosting company (EngineHosting) immediately took the site down and began an investigation. When they discovered the prank, they notified both their clients and the public that it wasn't a hack and neither their commercial product (Expression Engine) nor their hosting service were vulnerable.

Over the course of these apparent hackings, the parties involved had remained silent and allowed the situation to escalate within both the Apple and Wordpress developer communities, who had grown very concerned by the vulnerabilities and the targeting of apple-related websites.

Over the following 24hrs, explanations and apologies were posted by the owners of macapper.com, macheist.com, glennwolsey.com and applematters.com over their involvement in the stunt and letting it get out-of-hand.

The final MacHeist II bundle contained 14 applications: 1Password, CoverSutra, Cha-Ching, iStopMotion, Tiki Magic Mini Golf, WingNuts 2, Awaken, TaskPaper, Speed Download 4, AppZapper, CSSEdit, Snapz Pro X, Pixelmator with VectorDesigner unlocked after $300,000 had been raised. There was an offer for people who refer a friend to receive LaunchBar and NoteBook. In all, $500,000 was raised toward the various charities.

== MacHeist III ==
In early 2009, enciphered ads started to appear on RSS feeds for Mac related blogs. They were encrypted with rot15, similar to rot13:

Ztte pc tnt dc BprWtxhi iwxh lttz. Hdbtiwxcv’h vdxcv sdlc…
wiie://lll.bprwtxhi.rdb

Decrypted:

Keep an eye on MacHeist this week. Something's going down...
http://www.macheist.com

MacHeist III began on Friday, February 6, 2009 with the first nanoMission (not to be confused with the serious game series, NanoMission). On February 13, 2009 the first official Mission began introducing Sophia, a new secret agent played by Lisa Bettany. The member base was divided into four teams to compete.

The MacHeist III bundle's content was revealed during a scheduled live show lasting from 8:00PM EDT to 10:00PM EDT, March 24. Hosted by Veronica Belmont, Chris Pirillo, and Lisa Bettany, the show revealed each app one by one. The initial apps were iSale, Picturesque, SousChef, World of Goo, PhoneView, LittleSnapper, Acorn, and Kinemac. Big Bang Board Games was also given to the first 25,000 purchasers. Users who referred friends received pop-pop and the Koingo Utility-Package for one and two referrals. The unlockables, in order, were Wiretap Studio (set to unlock at $100,000, and did so 16 hours after the bundle was released). , BoinxTV (set to unlock at $400,000, and did so the morning of April 5) , and a mega-unlock, The Hit List, and Espresso (set to unlock together at $500,000, which was achieved a while before the end of the promotion). Additional "Bonus Applications" Cro-Mag Rally and Times were added March 31 and April 4, respectively, to boost sales. The Bundle concluded April 7 at Midnight with a total of 88,401 copies sold and $842,648 raised for charity. After the sale closed, one final app, AppShelf, was added along with a downloadable file containing a purchasers license info in an AppShelf plist file. Two days later, MacHeist donated $10,455 to make it an even $850,000.

After that, there were prizes for each team. 1st place (green) got 4 apps, 2nd (orange) got 3, 3rd (blue) got 2, and 4th (purple) got one (iClip).

== MacHeist nanoBundle ==
On November 6, 2009, MacHeist's first nanoBundle was presented on a live stream. The bundle consisted of six applications: ShoveBox, WriteRoom, Twitterrific, TinyGrab, Hordes of Orcs, Mariner Write (unlockable when 500,000 users received the bundle). This bundle was available for one week and was free. MacHeist was also offering Virus Barrier for free if the bundle was shared on Facebook.

== MacHeist nanoBundle II ==
On March 1, 2010, MacHeist's second nanoBundle was announced via an email to begin sales on March 3, 2010. In the time between the announcement and the sale, MacHeist offered Latenitesoft's Squeeze (Now known as Clusters) as a free download. The bundle consisted of seven applications: MacJournal, RipIt, Clips, CoverScout, Flow, Tales of Monkey Island (unlockable when 30,000 users received the bundle), and RapidWeaver (unlockable but not announced how many need to purchase). MacHeist also added Tracks, Airbust Extreme and Burning Monkey Solitaire for free if the bundle was shared on Twitter. This bundle was available until March 10, 2010 and was $19.95.

On March, 7, three days before the end of the offer, the number of purchases surpassed 30,000 and Tales of Monkey Island was unlocked. A target of 50,000 purchases was announced for unlocking RapidWeaver. As a teaser, Tweetie was briefly listed in the bundle. Later, Tweetie disappeared from the list, but its icon appeared half-occluded on MacHeist website. After the number of purchasers surpassed 50,000 and RapidWeaver got unlocked, it was announced that Tweetie would be unlocked at 56,789 bundle sales. The license for Tweetie was valid for Tweetie 2, and included pre-launch access to a beta of the software. On March 9, 2010, the number of bundle sales surpassed 56,789, and Tweetie was unlocked for all purchasers. The offer ended on March 11, 2010, and a total number of 87,854 bundles were sold.

== MacHeist IV ==
On September 12, 2012, MacHeist released a camera app for iOS called "Who's Quilly." The next day, MacHeist tweeted a quote from the poem "the Spider and the Fly," notifying of a website 'blackout'. Both of these pages have materials hosted in a '/mh4' folder, indicating MH4 was coming.

At around 11:00 BST, MacHeist 4 begun with a message on their Facebook page and the release of the MacHeist Agent App. Ironically, the site's previous intentional blackout preceded an unintentional blackout, as the site was slow to respond due to the number of visits.

On September 16, 2012, MacHeist 4 officially launched, after a message from John Casasanta on the previous day. MacHeist 4 had eight series of puzzle games (called Missions and nanoMissions, from 1 to 4 each) at the end of which users would get free software as prizes and also discount coins for this season's bundle. Later on, all the 20 software programs collectively called "the loot" were made available to everyone in a "pay with a tweet" program in order to help promote MacHeist 4 on Twitter. Users who had already 'heisted' the loot were awarded another application, Favs. The puzzle games called the Missions/nanoMissions each had their own Mac, iPhone and iPad apps and there was also a MacHeist Agent app that displayed the site's announcements and also awarded those who used it another discount coin for the bundle.

One month later, on October 16, the MacHeist 4 reveal show launched the bundle, initially consisting of 15 Mac applications: Bejeweled 3, Scrivener, Realmac Software's Courier, PDF Signer, Mapdiva Artboard], Jurassic Park, Radium, MacWare DiskTools Pro, Ohanaware HDRtist], Firetask, BioShock 2, Corel Painter Lite (which was promoted as originally launched on MacHeist 4) and a 15-month subscription to Evernote Premium. Initially Firetask, BioShock 2, Painter Lite were 'locked' and were supposed to be unlocked as the sales grew. Firetask was supposed to be unlocked at 25.000 bundles sold, and the other two at an 'unknown' but supposedly higher sales figure. 25% from each bundle sale was announced to be donated to the charity that users choose at purchase time, from the list put together by the MacHeist team. CleanMyMac was also offered as a referral reward.

MacHeist 4 added a total of 6 more applications to the bundle: MacGourmet Deluxe 3, Printopia, Braid, Bartender, TuneUp and MoneyBag, unlocked Firetask and BioShock 2 ahead of time, sold 25,000 bundles of Painter Lite, and added three more days to the bundle sale duration. The final sales figures were: 44,149 bundles sold, raising $315,000 for charity and three times more for MacHeist and its partners.

== MacHeist nanoBundle 3 ==
NanoBundle 3 contained Fantastical, CleanMyMac 2, Totals, Clarify, xScope, iStopMotion, Path Finder and Little Inferno.

== MacHeist nanoBundle 4 ==
NanoBundle 4 contained Mac DVDRipper Pro, Intensify Pro, Swift Publisher, Hype, Chocolat, LaunchBar, djay, Limbo and PaintCode.

== MacHeist nanoBundle 5 ==
NanoBundle 5 contained Cinemagraph Pro, WebCode, Periscope Pro, Vitamin-R, Silo, MediaCentral, and Oscura: Second Shadow, with Intaglio and Data Rescue 3 added after participation goals were met.

== Criticism ==
MacHeist I was criticized by several members of the Mac community, most notably John Gruber of the Daring Fireball blog, Paul Kafasis of Rogue Amoeba Software, and Gus Mueller of Flying Meat Software, who later participated in The Macheist III Bundle with Acorn. Some independent Mac software developers, who chose not to participate in MacHeist, felt that the proclamation from the MacHeist organisers that it was "The Week of the Independent Mac Developer" was an inappropriate form of marketing.

While exact royalty payment amounts have not been released to the public, Gruber and others questioned the value of the promotion to the participating developers, citing offers made to developers of around US$5,000 per application, whereas the MacHeist bundle grossed nearly US$800,000. Gruber's estimates indicate that the net profits for the MacHeist team likely far exceeded the total charity donation and the royalties paid to participating developers combined. Additionally, some thought that setting goals to "unlock" NewsFire and TextMate in terms of dollars raised for charity was deceptive and unethical.

However, several of the developers whose applications were featured in MacHeist I, including Wil Shipley, author of Delicious Library, defended their decision to participate in the promotion. They cited exposure to new users, the potential for increased upgrade revenue in the future, and other factors for their participation in MacHeist I, despite the seemingly low amount of revenue generated directly from MacHeist.

There has been criticism of MacHeist II, with some customers being charged multiple times for the software bundle despite the website proclaiming that 'the order can not be processed'. In addition to this, the support services provided by John Casasanta and the rest of the MacHeist team has been ridiculed as they initially refused to respond to customer complaints about the problem, or issue refunds for overcharging.

== Community ==
MacHeist maintained an online user forum. During missions, members actively chat, post and talk about the presented puzzles and possible methods of approach. The Staff and Directorate (head staff) often participate in discussions. Developers also discuss their applications on the forum and can update their applications based on MacHeist member feedback and bug-reports.

== Clones ==
After the initial MacHeist I promotion, several users of the site created imitation sites. Most of these sites proved to be much less successful than the original. On July 9, 2007, MacUpdate began a promotion that very closely resembled the MacHeist I bundle sale, in that it sold a bundle of Mac OS X software applications that increased in size with a greater number of sales. The MacUpdate bundle sold nearly 2,000 copies in the first two days. MacHeist became an affiliate with this bundle, selling additional applications that MacUpdate did not along with the MacUpdate bundle.
