= Camera (disambiguation) =

A camera is a device to make photographs or movies.

Camera may also refer to:

== Arts, entertainment and media ==
=== Film ===
- Camera (2000 film), a 2000 short film by David Cronenberg
- Camera (2014 film), a 2014 Singaporean film by James Leong

=== Music ===
- Camera (album), a 2010 album by Joe Morris
- "Camera" (Ed Sheeran song), 2025
- "Camera" (Charli XCX song), 2026
- "Camera", a 1984 song by R.E.M. from their album Reckoning
- "Camera", a 2005 song by Editors from their album The Back Room
- "Cameras", a 1980 song by Cardiacs from their album The Obvious Identity
- "Cameras", a 2011 song by Wiz Khalifa from his album Rolling Papers

=== Literature ===
- Camera (Japanese magazine), a former magazine
- Camera (magazine), a magazine published in Switzerland and elsewhere
- Camera (newspaper), a newspaper published in the U.S. city of Boulder, Colorado
- The Camera (American magazine), a former magazine
- The Camera (Irish magazine), a former magazine

== Science ==
- Camera (cephalopod), a chamber in the shell of some cephalopods
- Community Cyberinfrastructure for Advanced Marine Microbial Ecology Research and Analysis, an online cloud computing service project
- Camera (wasp), a genus of ichneumonid wasps

== Other uses ==
- Committee for Accuracy in Middle East Reporting and Analysis, a Boston-based nonprofit, pro-Israel media watchdog group
- Camera+, an app for Apple's iOS mobile operating system

== See also ==
- Apostolic Camera, an office of the Roman Curia
- List of camera types
- Camera obscura (disambiguation)
- 3D camera
- In camera (disambiguation)
- Camera Café
- Camera Camera
- Camera, Camera, Camera, a manga series
- Campaign for Real Ale (CAMRA)
- Camara
- Kamera
