= Otto Matic =

2001 video game

- Developers: Pangea Software; Ideas From the Deep (PC)
- Publishers: Aspyr Media (Mac); Ideas From the Deep (PC); Pangea Software (iOS, Apple TV)
- Platforms: Mac OS 8, Mac OS 9, Mac OS X, Linux, Microsoft Windows, iOS, Apple TV
- Release: December 4, 2001: Macintosh; NA: December 4, 2001 Microsoft Windows; WW: February 23, 2004 (Online); NA: February 23, 2005 (Retail) iPhone OS; WW: March 6, 2009
- Genre: Action-adventure
- Mode: Single player

Otto Matic is a 2001 action-adventure video game developed by Pangea Software and published by Aspyr Media for Mac OS 8, Mac OS 9 and Mac OS X. It came bundled with iMac G3 and G4 computers. The game was later ported by Ideas From the Deep to Microsoft Windows in 2004. An iPhone OS port, titled Otto Matic: Alien Invasion, was released by Pangea in 2009.

Otto Matic parodies the retro science fiction genre in a whimsical style. Its gameplay resembles that of Pangea's previous titles like Bugdom and Nanosaur.

In September 2021, the game as well as other Pangea software titles received a free, open source re-release for Windows, modern macOS, and Linux.

== Gameplay ==
The gameplay of Otto Matic is level-based, and the player's success on a level is measured with points. Levels typically begin with Otto landing his rocket ship on a planet controlled by the Brain Aliens. As soon as Otto has disembarked, the rocket ship promptly takes off again and lands at the end of the level. To progress to the next level, the player must return to the rocket ship with enough fuel for take off. The majority of the game's points are scored by saving humans from abduction, although some points are also awarded for finding weapons and ammunition.

The levels include power-ups such as weapons, health, rocket fuel and jump-jet fuel, and occasionally brief vehicle sections. The level design tends towards the whimsical: enemies include enormous walking vegetables, clowns, and miniature robotic wrecking balls, and the landscapes are usually cartoonish and warped.

== Plot ==
Otto Matic takes place in the year 1957, as the Earth is being conquered by the evil Brain Aliens from Planet X. The people of Earth are being systematically abducted by the flying saucers of the Brain Aliens, who wish to transform the humans into new Brain Aliens, subject to the will of their leader, the Giant Brain.

The player takes on the role of Otto Matic, one of a line of robots charged with policing the galaxy, as he attempts to defeat the Brain Aliens and restore the independence of the Earth. Otto travels to eight planets and rescues the humans, defeating the Giant Brain in a final confrontation.
