= Haarlemmerhout =

Oldest public park in the Netherlands

Coordinates: 52°22′00″N 4°37′27″E

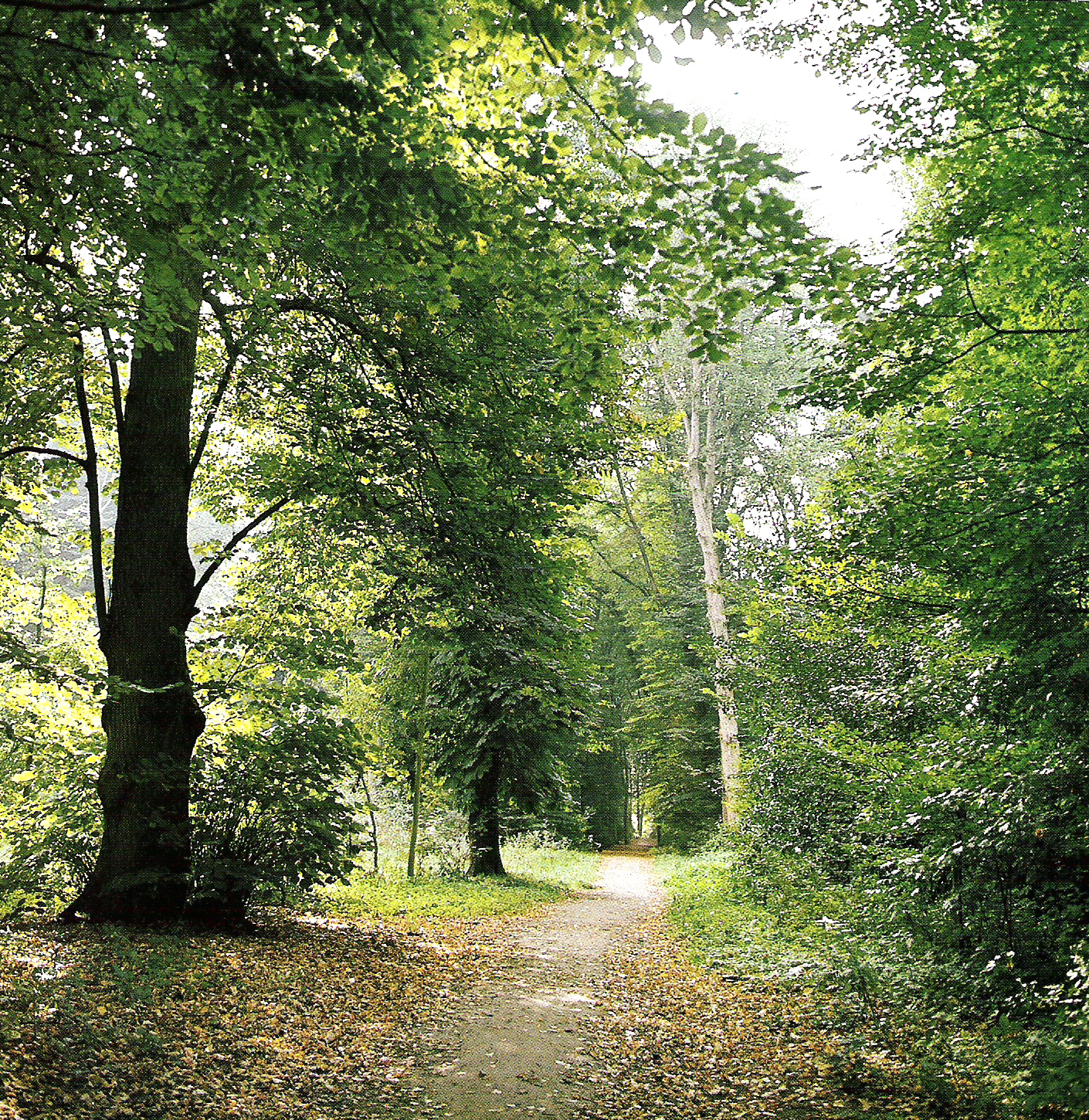
The Haarlemmerhout in Summer. It is said that Napoleon's soldiers carved their initials in these trees.

The Haarlemmerhout is the oldest public park of the Netherlands. It lies on the south side of Haarlem, on the same old sandy sea wall that is shared by the public park Haagse Bos in The Hague and the Alkmaarderhout in Alkmaar.

== History ==
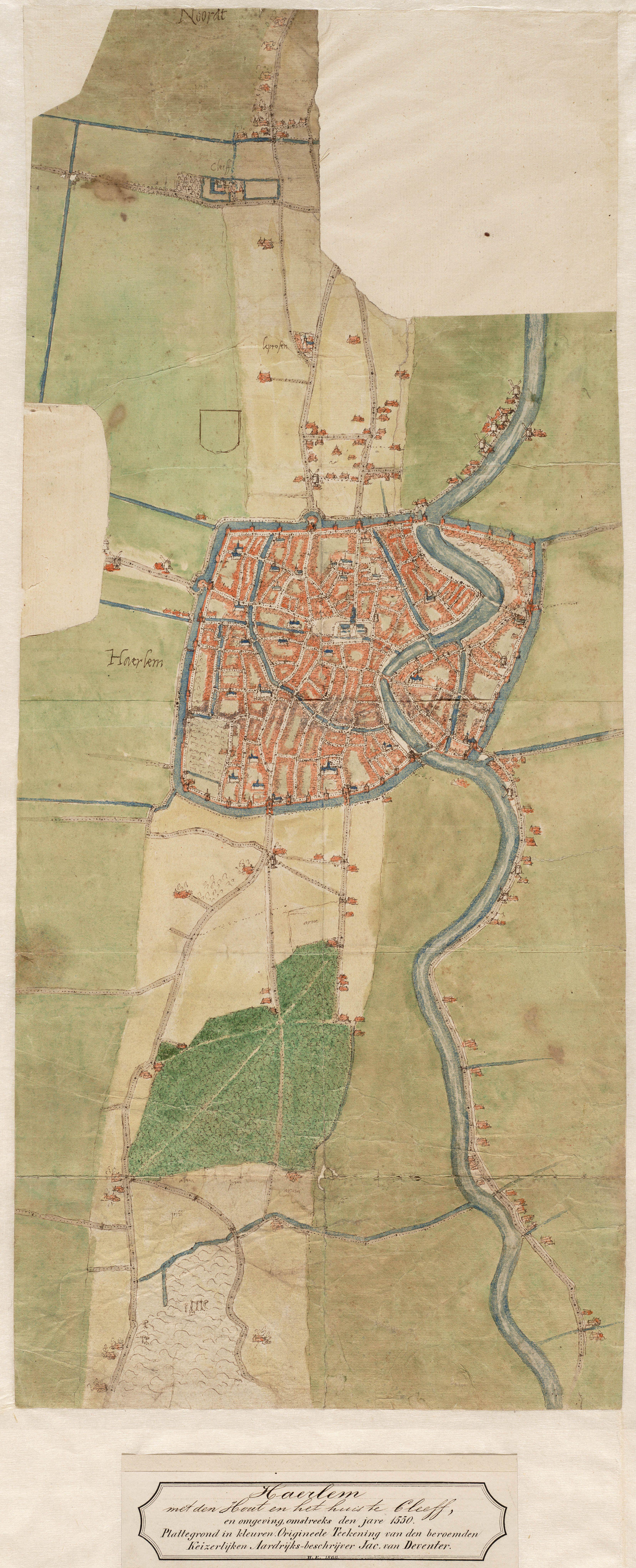
Early map of Haarlem from 1560 showing the Haarlemmer Hout much as it is today

On a map drawn in 1560 of Haarlem, the Haarlemmerhout is shown in the characteristic form that it has today. It was burned by the Spaniards during the siege of Haarlem, but replanted. The east–west road at the southern edge of the park still exists and is called the Spanjaardslaan (Spaniard's lane) in memory of this event.

Across the centuries, various landscape artists have made new plans for this wood. But the long vista through the eastern portion of the park designed in 1760 by Jan van Vorel exists up to this day, affording a view of the government building villa Welgelegen.

Though several parks in the Netherlands date from medieval times, the Haarlemmerhout is special because it was never locked by a gate, and when the park was redesigned in 1760, it was planted in the fashionable English style with a view for public access. Though in earlier centuries the park served as a common ground for farm animals and fire kindling, the redesigned park came to be used as a place for recreation in the sense currently given to public parks today.

Though today all of the park lies within the city limits of Haarlem, the Southern end of the park was in Heemstede until this land was annexed by Haarlem in 1927. Heemstede did not charge taxes on drinking beer and wine in public taverns, and for this reason drinking in Heemstede taverns in the park was very popular and even caused an argument between the Haarlem city council and the Heemstede city council that escalated to the high court of Mechelen and had to be resolved in 1539 with a special map by Simon Meeuszoon. At the time the economy of Haarlem was depressed, so the need for extra income was high.

== Gallery ==
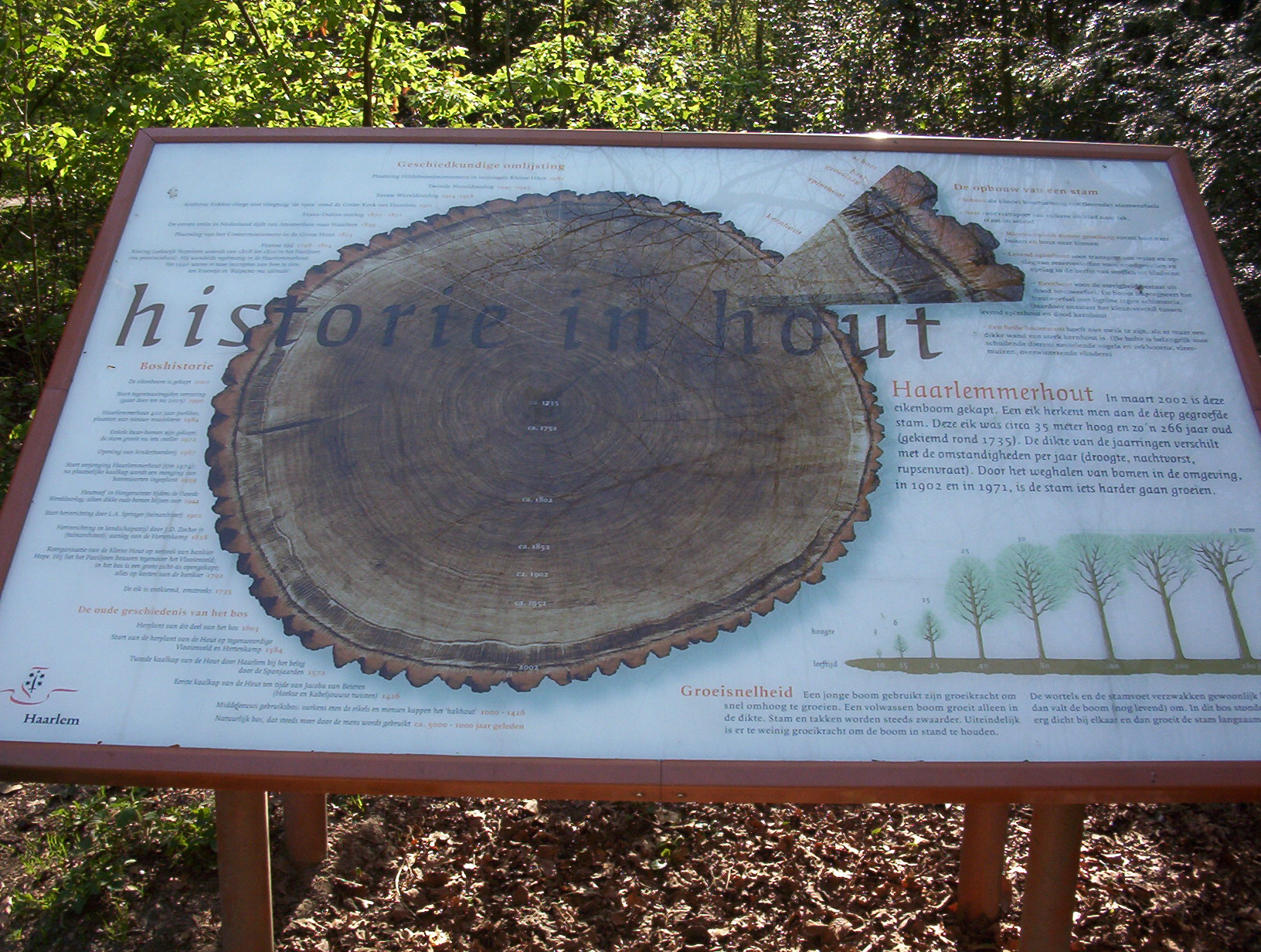
Plaque in Haarlemmerhout next to old treestump.

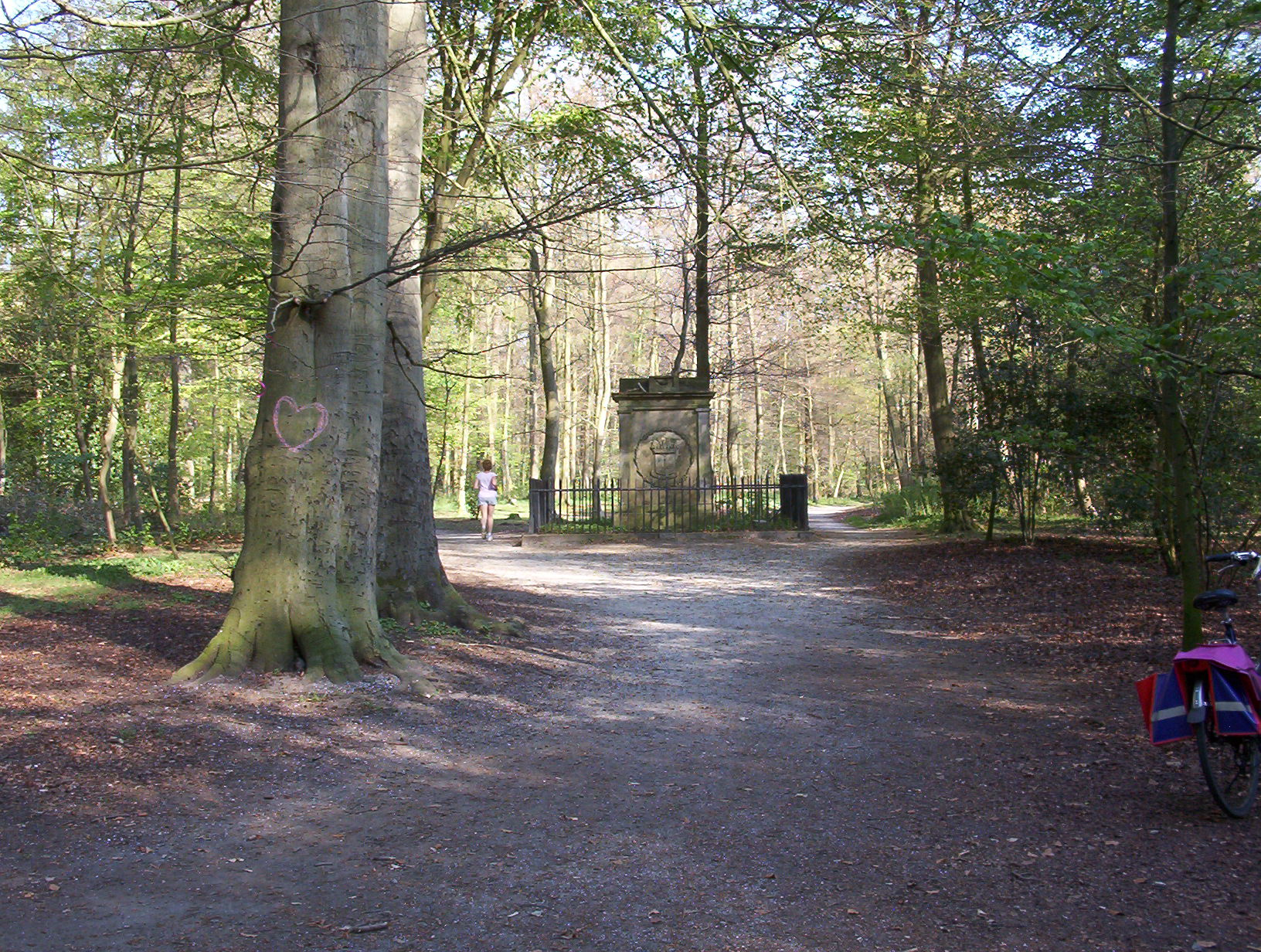
Monument in Haarlemmerhout to Laurens Janszoon Coster, once thought by Haarlemers to be the inventor of the printing press.

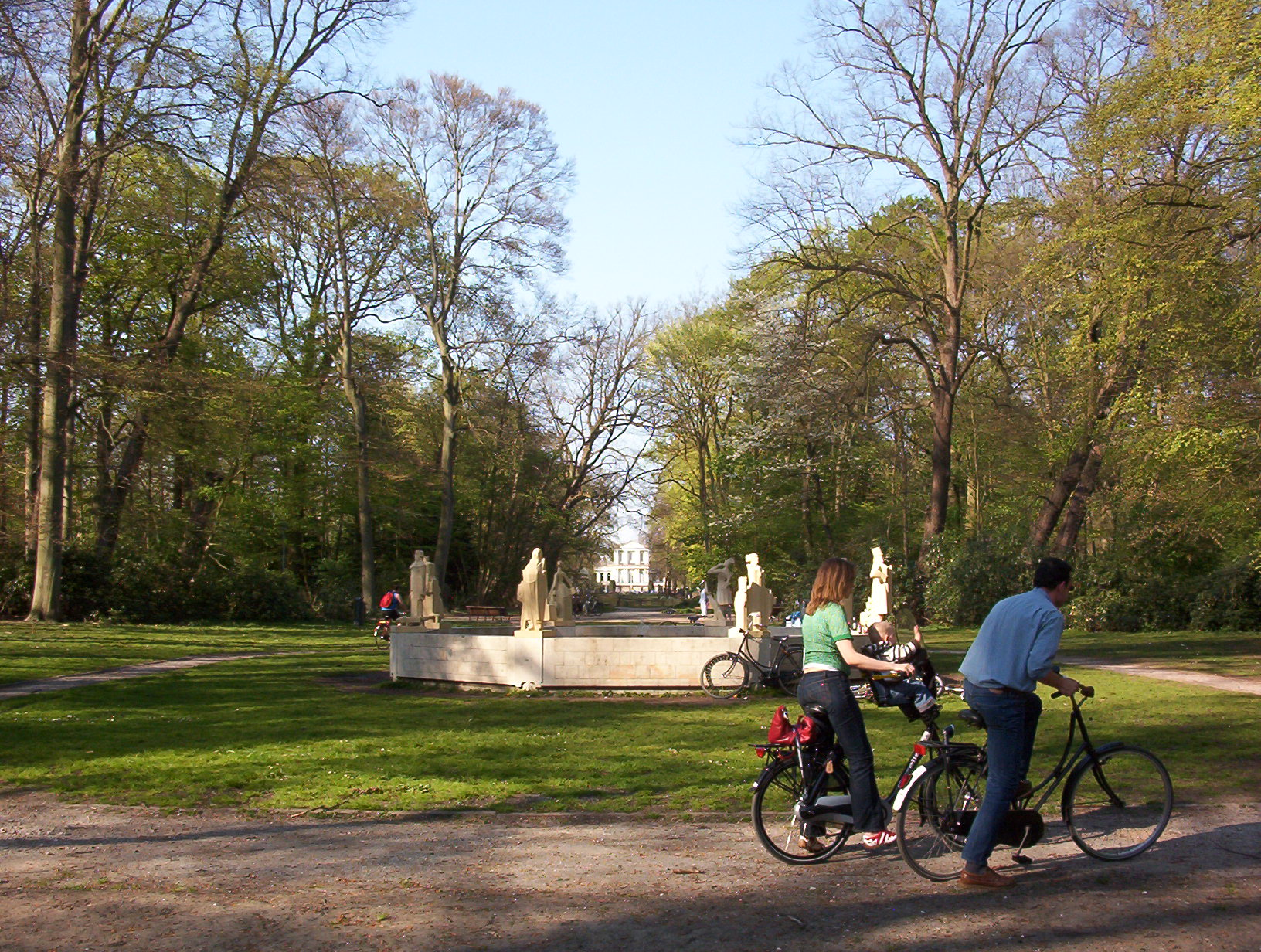
Hildebrand Monument in Haarlemmerhout. In the far background is villa Welgelegen. This view is Jan van Vorel's vista through the woods.

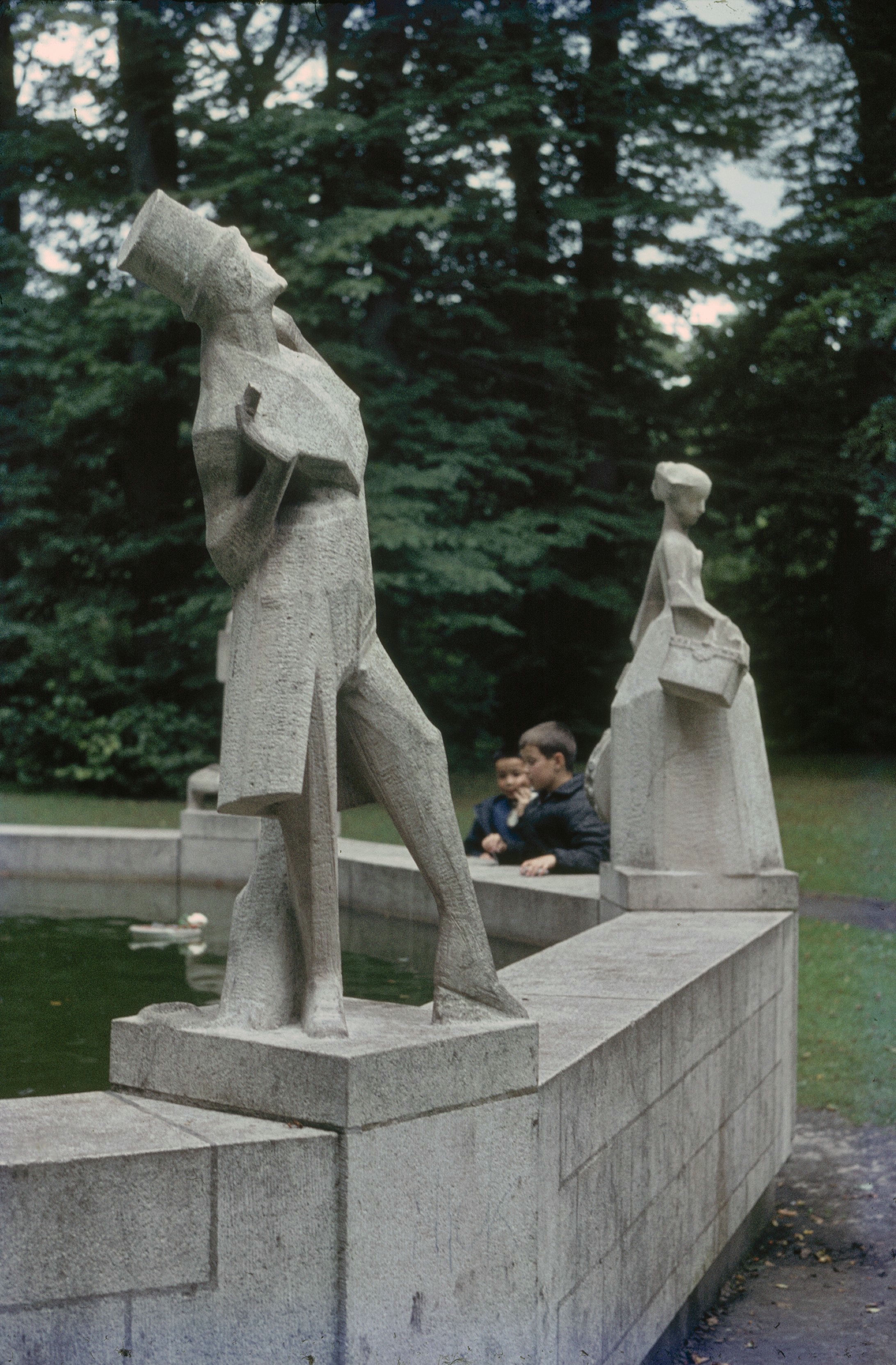
View on sculptures Camera Obscura in the park
