= Active Lancer =

2003 video game

- Developer: Freeverse
- Publisher: Freeverse
- Platforms: Mac OS, Mac OS X
- Release: October 20, 2003
- Genre: Shoot Em Up

Active Lancer is a 2D shoot 'em up video game created by Freeverse for Mac OS 9 and macOS. It plays in the style of many old school computer games and features little plot line or story development. The demo is downloadable from macgamefiles.com. There are several levels the player is required to complete. It lacks a multiplayer mode but two players can play together on the same computer. It was much less successful than Freeverse's popular WingNuts Series.

It was re-released as part of a 'Best of Original Mac Games' bundle from Freeverse.

== Storyline ==
In the game the player is cast as a member of the "Active Lancer Corps". He is the lone survivor of a failed attack on the home world of an alien race known as the "cherries" where he has to face fast unending attacks by the aliens.
