= Camera Camera =

Camera Camera may refer to:

- Camera Camera (Renaissance album), 1981
- Camera Camera (Nazia and Zoheb Hassan album), 1992

== See also ==
- Camera, Camera, Camera, a manga series
- Camera (disambiguation)
