= Cro-Mag Rally =

2000 video game

- Developer: Pangea Software
- Publisher: Aspyr
- Designer: Brian Greenstone
- Composer: Mike Beckett
- Platforms: Mac OS 9, Mac OS X, iOS, Windows Phone 7, Xbox 360, Android
- Release: NA: October 2000; (Mac): NA: July 10, 2008; EU: August 24, 2008; (iOS)
- Genre: Kart racing game
- Modes: Single-player, multiplayer

Cro-Mag Rally is a kart racing game developed by Pangea Software and published by Aspyr, which takes place in caveman times. It was originally released for Mac OS 9 and Mac OS X, and was later ported to iOS, Xbox 360, Android, and Windows Phone 7.

== Gameplay ==
Inspired by kart racing games like Mario Kart, the game centres around two caveman racers, Brog and Grag, in vehicles made out of materials associated with cavemen, as they race through stages of ancient history. The goal is to guide the caveman through different sets of tracks that include hazards, such as pits and tornadoes. Every track aside from the first 3 need to be unlocked by winning in tournaments in Tournament Mode. Races always last 3 laps, with multiple difficulty settings. During a race, the players can pick up 2 kinds of power up: offensive weapons that need to be manually activated (like exploding bones, oil slicks and roman candles) and temporary performance upgrades that are activated when picked up. The upgrades last for 20 seconds. At the beginning, only a few vehicles are available. They all behave differently, making a distinction in control, speed, suspension and traction attributes. However, as progress is made, all eleven vehicles can be unlocked.

The single-player mode consists of a Practice Mode, where the players can test the vehicles and tracks, and a Tournament Mode with nine stages divided between three periods: the Bronze Age, the Stone Age, and the Iron Age. To progress in the game, the player has to finish a race in third position or higher, while collecting eight arrowheads across the level at the same time. There is a Physics Editor, which allows the player to alter elements of play such as speed, acceleration, suspension, and traction of each car, as well as gravity.

Screenshot of a race at the Desert track

Cro-Mag Rally has multiple multiplayer modes. In the original Mac version, the game allows up to six players to compete via LAN and two in a split-screen mode. A number of modes are available, such as Race, Tag, Survive, and Quest For Fire. Race is the usual mode with the players having a battle for first place. There are two versions of Tag, both being each other's opposites: Keep-Away and Stampede. Keep-Away begins with one player being "it", with the goal of being the last player standing by avoiding elimination by not being "it" and ends when all but one of the players have been eliminated by being "it" far too long. Meanwhile, in Stampede, the winner is whoever has managed to be "it" for two minutes. Survive has the players fight by slamming into each other and firing weapons until one player is left. Similar to the game Capture The Flag, Quest For Fire splits the players into two teams, trying to seize five torches from the enemies and move them to their base.

The iOS version uses the accelerometer for steering left and right, with specific touch-screen buttons for driving forwards or backwards and using weapons. A variety of options can be adjusted separately, like steering sensitivity. It has only two game modes: Race, with a focus on beating the others to the finish line, and Gather, which relies on picking up arrowheads on the track as fast as possible. Every track is unlocked by default.

== Release ==
Cro-Mag Rally initially released for Mac OS 9 in October 2000 as the third in Pangea Software's line of 3D games. After its initial Mac OS 9 release, Cro‑Mag Rally was also bundled with Apple’s consumer Mac models. In April 2002, Pangea re‑released the game as a shareware title after its commercial run and bundle period.

Following the developer's transition to focus on iOS development, a port was released for iOS in 2008. Three years later in 2011, a port for Windows Phone 7 was produced by Citizen 12 Studio. The same studio released a port for Xbox 360 in January 2012, and an updated "Extreme!" version the following month. The Citizen 12 Studio ports offered multiplayer via Xbox LIVE, while the iOS port offered four-player multiplayer via Game Center.

In 2022, game developer Iliyas Jorio released an updated free and open-source port of the game on itch.io for Windows, Linux, and macOS with the permission of Pangea Software. In keeping with the original release order of Pangea Software's games, Cro-Mag Rally was the third game rewritten to be playable on modern operating systems, following Bugdom and Nanosaur.

== Reception ==
Reception

Review scores
Publication	Score
IGN	7/10
Pocket Gamer	4/5
Inside Mac Games	8.5/10
MacLife	3/5

Cro-Mag Rally has received mixed reviews. A reviewer for Inside Mac Games gave the original Mac version an 8.5 out of 10, praising the game's graphics, gameplay and audio. A reviewer for Windows Central gave a negative review of the Windows Phone port, criticising the controls, gameplay and graphics, and likened it to a straight port of E.T the Extra-Terrestrial with Xbox achievements.
