= Kamera =

Kamera may refer to:

- Kamera (genus), a genus of eukaryotes with only one known species.
- Poison laboratory of the Soviet secret services
- "Kamera", a song from Wilco's 2002 album Yankee Hotel Foxtrot
- Ivan Kamera (1897–1952), a Soviet military officer
- Kamera-Werkstätten, a photography company of Germany
- Aktuelle Kamera, a television newscast in the German Democratic Republic
- Goldene Kamera, a German film and television award

== See also ==
- Camera (disambiguation)
