= Lisa Bettany =

Canadian photographer and entrepreneur (born 1981)

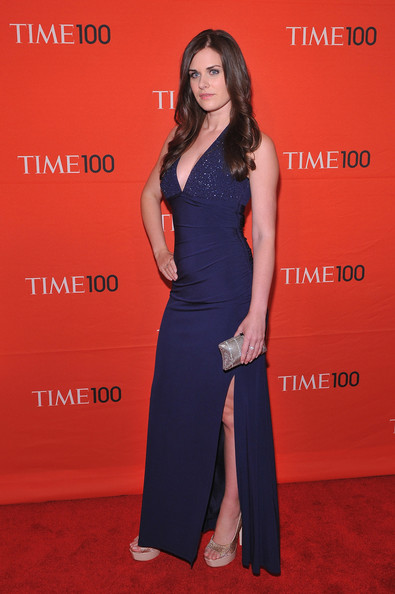
- Bettany in 2010
- Born: November 3, 1981 (age 45); Victoria, British Columbia, Canada
- Occupations: Photographer, Entrepreneur
- Notable work: Camera+ app

Lisa Bettany (born November 3, 1981) is a Canadian technology entrepreneur and photographer. She is the cofounder of the iPhone camera app Camera+. She has a YouTube channel based around travel and photography and lifestyle.

== Biography ==
Born to British parents, Bettany grew up in Victoria, British Columbia, where her father was a computer professor.

She was a competitive figure skater from the age of three until a back injury at 19. She also developed her blog during this time.

In 2009, Bettany partnered with a team of six developers to develop Camera+, which launched in June 2010. The app generated revenues of $2 million within its first year.

Lisa Bettany was included in the 2014 Fast Company Most Creative People in Business 1000 list. Forbes named Bettany as a top female tech entrepreneur in 2012. She has also been featured in Entrepreneur, Elle , The New York Times, Fast Company Labs and ShutterLove.

She served as a producer for MacHeist and has played the characters of Sophia and Amelia. She was formerly a host on the Canadian gadget show GetConnected.
