= Koingo Software =

Software company in Canada

Koingo Software, Inc.
- Type: Corporation
- Industry: Computer software
- Founded: May 7, 1995
- Headquarters: Canada
- Products: AirRadar; Alarm Clock Pro; Data Guardian; Digital Sentry; Display Maestro; Librarian Pro; MacCleanse; MacPilot
- Number of employees: 2
- Website: www.koingosw.com

Koingo Software, established in 1994, is a Canadian corporation that designs and distributes software for both Macintosh and Windows. Presently, the business develops a mix of 8 shareware and freeware applications, most of which are available for the Macintosh and Windows.

Except for a few games in the past, the majority of the titles have been geared towards personal time, data, security, and information management such as for home inventory, scheduling, password and data storage, and digital anti-theft monitoring and protection.

== Early history ==
Koingo Software originally branded its productions under both the Koingo Games and Pain Games titles. These products included titles such as Rocket Launch, Sewer Trouble, and Valley of the Vampire which were black and white HyperCard adventure games.

In 1999, the business began also developing products in REALbasic. These new products, such as Alarm Clock Pro (a time management utility), Password Retriever (password database utility), and Contact Keeper (simple address book), not being games, the organization rebranded itself as Koingo Software.

== Recent history ==
In December 2012, Koingo's founder took a leave of absence from the company for five years to pursue other business ventures such as starting his online travel blog on Instagram "adventurejosh.ca" and adventurejosh.com. Upon his return, Koingo gave away a new MacBook to one of the adventurejosh.ca followers on March 1, 2017. With his return, Koingo shortly thereafter released a massive overhaul of their flagship application MacPilot, bringing it to version 9, with promises of doing the same for MacCleanse.

== Community involvement ==
Koingo Software has played an active role in the Macintosh community by regularly donating licenses to Macintosh User Groups, and participating in third-party giveaways and discounts with sites like MacZot and MacHeist.

In 2006 through part of 2007, Koingo Software gave away 10,881 copies of their MacPilot application to all users renewing or signing up for a VersionTracker membership.

The largest joint venture undertaken was the coupling of Koingo Software's Utility Package (the combination of all 12 of their software titles at the time) with MacUpdate's 2008 back-to-school bundle. Then later that year, the businesses offered Koingo Software's MacPilot in the 2008 Christmas Holiday Bundle.

== Reviews ==
- MacWorld's Editor's Choice: Alarm Clock Pro
- MacWorld Editor's Review: MacPilot
- MacWorld Editor's Review: AirRadar
- MacAddict Magazine Feature for Alarm Clock Pro, April 2004 Issue
- C|Net: Alarm Clock Pro Editor's Review
- C|Net: MacPilot Editor's Review
- The Spinning Beachball: MacPilot Review

== Current software ==
=== Applications ===
- AirRadar

Scan for wireless networks, and provides detailed information such as encryption type, signal, noise, ad-hoc status, pbcc flag, channel, MAC address, and beacon interval.

- Alarm Clock Pro

Schedule tasks such as playing multimedia files (including via iTunes), running system scripts, composing and sending e-mails, pinging web URLs, sending text messages and taking web cam and screenshots on a schedule or by timer.

- Data Guardian

The successor to Password Retriever. Allows the secure storage of data into a 448-bit blowfish encrypted database.

- Display Maestro

Access all display resolutions and bit depths

- Librarian Pro

Interacting with Amazon, automatically downloads product details based on UPC or ISBN to create a home inventory. Items can be marked out as "borrowed by" entered users.

- MacCleanse

Erases caches, logs, recent file histories, and browser histories.

- MacPilot

Presents a graphical front-end for many advanced UNIX commands; additionally, provides the same interface for tweaking hundreds of hidden preferences available in Mac OS X.

== Discontinued software ==
=== As Koingo Software ===
The following applications have been discontinued:

- Alarm Clock
- Blaze
- Contact Keeper
- Digital Sentry
- E-Mail Commander
- File Sheriff
- Font Pilot
- Gallery Designer
- MacPilot Lite
- Magick 8 Ball
- Mystery Island
- Password Retriever
- PTE
- Robo Postman
- Swift Share
- Slideshow Magic

=== As Koingo Games ===
- Murder Mystery
- Rocket Launch
- Rocket Launch II
- Sewer Trouble

=== As Pain Games ===
- Captain Comic
- Character Creator
- Crime City
- Movie 2000
- New York Blast Out
- Slime House
- Super Dice
- Valley of the Vampire
