= Nour Zaki =

Egyptian film director (born 1988)

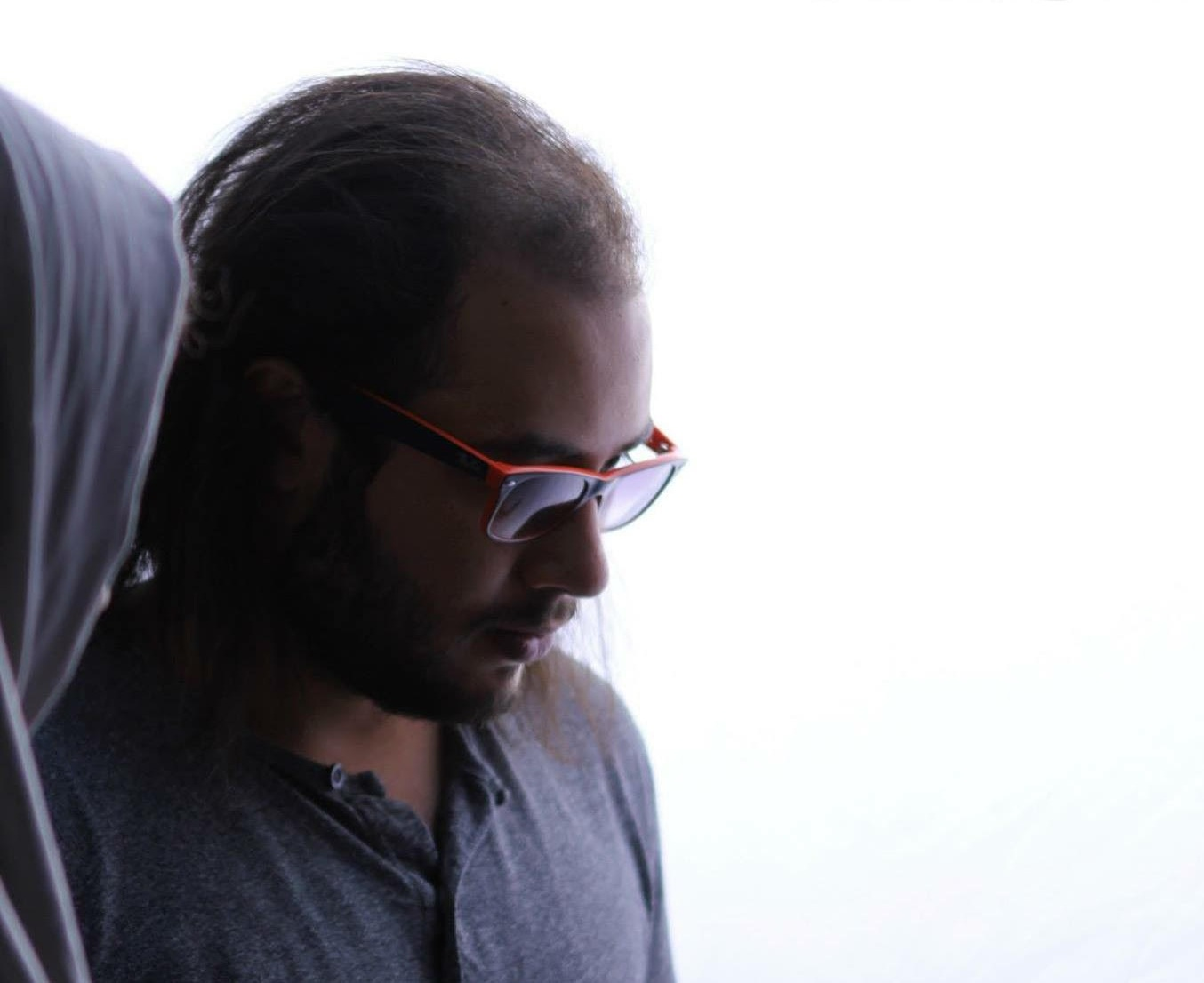
- Born: Nour El-din Samir Zaki; 17 August 1988 (age 38); Heliopolis (Cairo suburb)
- Education: New York Film Academy
- Occupations: Film Director, writer, producer
- Years active: 2005–present

Nour Zaki (Arabic: نور زكي) (born on 17 August 1988) is an Egyptian film director. A winner at the Women's Voices Now film festival, Zaki's works have been acclaimed for celebrating Arab heritage and putting a spotlight on the events and the aftermath of the 2011 Egyptian uprising.

== Early life and education ==
Zaki was born in the Cairo suburb of Heliopolis to a businessman and a journalist. A single child, he was raised by his mother. She decided to enrol Zaki in the directors program at the Film Science & Technology Academy.

== Career ==
Zaki studied for a Bachelors of Mass Communication at the University of Wales, Prifysgol Cymru. While there he directed his first short film, "The Chase", based on Nageeb Mahfouz's "Rawa we Skyna" novel. The film served as his Bachelor's thesis project.

Shortly after graduation Zaki traveled to Los Angeles and started a one-year conservatory film program at the New York Film Academy where he directed his second film, "Not Yielded but conquered". The film was highly praised as it focused on themes such as journalistic ethics and the Egyptian political and social arena at the time of the Muslim Brotherhood. After seeing the film, a number of his teachers recommended him for the Masters program at the academy which secured him a grant. He received his MFA in film in 2014. His MFA thesis was "A Chronicle of Tahrir Square". The movie follows the story of a young girl trying to save her father during the violent clashes of 2 February 2011 in Tahrir square, known to the media as "the battle of the camel". The movie was a big production, involving an international cast and was filmed between Los Angeles and Cairo. It won the 3rd prize at the Women's Voices Now film festival in 2014.

In 2014, Zaki served as a producer for his friend and writing partner, Leonardo Garcia, on his film "Afraid of heights" and a second unit director for Vincent Blake's music video "Muhamed Ali". From 2013 till late 2014 he worked as a director and a producer on the AppAdvice daily show with Robin Rhys.

In 2015, Zaki moved back to Egypt. His first project was "Camera Obscura", a film about Alhazen's discovery of light and subsequently the invention of the camera. It starred and was produced by the Egyptian Khaled Abol Naga in the role of Alhazen. The film is currently in the festival circuit and has been nominated for a few awards including The Boston Global Film Festival. It also served as the symbol for the Visionaria film festival in Milan. Khaled Abol Naga's involvement in the project along with the subject matter gave the film media attention in the Middle East with Khaled expressing his desire to turn it into a feature film.

Zaki collaborated with Amr Waked, directing the commercial campaign for RSM Egypt's 20th anniversary.

== Awards and honours ==
- Women's Voices Now film festival - Winner
- Boston Global Film festival - Nominated
- Qabila film festival – screening
- Visionaria film festival

== Filmography ==
- The Chase 2011 – Writer, director
- Not Yielded but conquered (2013) – Film Director
- A Chronicle of Tahrir Square (2014) – Writer, Film Director
- Camera Obscura 2015 – Writer, Film Director, Film editing
- 20 years RSM (2016) Director
