= Xenocide (video game) =

1989 video game

- Developers: Pangea Software (GS); Manley & Associates (MS-DOS)
- Publisher: Micro Revelations
- Designer: Brian Greenstone
- Programmers: Brian Greenstone (GS); Doug Deardorff (MS-DOS)
- Platforms: Apple IIGS, MS-DOS
- Release: 1989: Apple IIGS; 1990: MS-DOS
- Genre: Run and gun

Xenocide is a run and gun video game for the Apple IIGS written by Pangea Software and published by Micro Revelations in 1989. An IBM PC compatible port using VGA graphics was developed by Manley & Associates and published in 1990. The box cover credits Brian Greenstone as the game's creator on both versions. Xenocide was the first commercially published game from Greenstone's company, Panega Software.

Reviewers liked the scrolling visuals and arcade-style shooter gameplay. Computer Gaming World called the plot of exterminating an entire alien race "reprehensible" and criticized the documentation for sounding like "fascist propaganda".

== Plot ==
Hostile alien Xenomorphs have infested the moons of the planet Talos IV and must be eradicated, along with the moons themselves, before they invade the planet. The reptilian humanoid aliens intend to devour the inhabitants of Talos IV, forcing the player to take the action of committing xenocide (the extermination of the entire species).

== Gameplay ==
Levels consists of 3 differing modes of game play: driving a hovercraft (front-view), jetpack flying and scuba-dive swimming (side-view), and walking through a bio-lab (top-view). Weapon and power-up capsules can be collected and used throughout the game. The goal is to collect 5 bombs and then set them off, destroying the moon. The sequence is then repeated for the remaining moons. The game consists of 12 levels in total (4 per moon) and repeat with each new moon, barring some minor visual differences and new enemies. The game is won when all 3 moons have been destroyed thus saving the planet.

=== Hovercraft level ===
The player starts by piloting a hovercraft, which floats just above the surface of the barren moon using Anti-Gravity Pads. A first-person view of the craft's windshield is shown. The object is to follow a road, while collecting as many canisters as possible (which determine ammunition capacity for next level). The player must avoid collisions with rocks and alien bug lifeforms, which either damage the player's vehicle or splatter on the player's windshield impairing visibility. Weapons include a limited number of missiles and fireballs, and one nuclear bomb, to help clear a path. The craft has a limited amount of fuel, and the player must find the docking port before running out to advance to the underground levels.

=== Cave level 1 ===
Now in a side-scrolling view, the player uses a jet-pack to fly through caves and caverns, searching throughout to find and collect 5 bombs. The player eliminate aliens in the caves using firing weapons. A laser gun and grenades (ammunition limited by number of canisters collected the previous level) allow killing enemies or breaking through obstructions. Power-up capsules randomly appear, and grabbing them cycles through 5 different menu options. When the player chooses to select an item, an improved weapon, new ability or shielding is provided. When the player runs low on jet-pack fuel or ammunition, it can be replenished via refueling bays found throughout the level. If the player runs out of fuel or loses all health, a life is lost. Once all 5 bombs have been collected, the docking pad exit at the end of the level opens.

=== Cave level 2 ===
The second cave level is very similar to the previous level, except the player now swims through underwater caves. Fuel is now replaced by oxygen, which the player needs to replenish, along with ammo, by finding refueling bays. Again alien creatures infest the level and must be eliminated. The goal is now to find and pick up 5 keys, which must be collected to unlock doors. At the end of the level is an exit docking pad to the final level.

=== Bio-lab level ===
In the final stage the play-view changes to overhead. The player walks around a bio-laboratory, but no longer has a time limit (i.e. fuel or oxygen). Attacking robot enemies must be eliminated and power-up capsules now provide new sets of weapons or abilities in the options menu. The player must search rooms for the 5 nuclear fuel ports, where bombs are dropped, and then locate the central computer room with an emergency teleport. Once the self-destruct sequence is activated (an alarm will sound), the player has just seconds to enter the teleporter before the moon explodes. When the mission is complete, the player moves to the next moon where the levels are repeated, albeit with slight visual changes.

== Development ==
Xenocide was the first game published under the Pangea Software name, programmed by Brian Greenstone with artwork by Dave Triplet. While the Apple IIGS version boasted multi-palette graphics (up to 256 colors), fast scrolling and made good use of the sound capabilities of the machine, the MS-DOS port, done by a third party, was considered inferior both graphically and in terms of audio. Pangea's museum of old releases reads: "The DOS version totally blew chunks, but the original Apple version kicked butt!"

Pangea advertised the games as: "Fast action - 12 play fields - 3 view modes - puzzle strategy" and boosted: "Three different modes of play view (3-D, Profile and Overhead), high-res graphics and superb sound"

== Reception ==
Charles Ardai reviewed the game for Computer Gaming World, and stated that "Encouraging players to take pleasure in indiscriminate killing can have no good end. One need not call for censorship, claim lasting harm to players or even direct people away from this game — Xenocide is quite enjoyable as a game and deserves to be played — but one can certainly register disapproval of the game's fiction and do oneself a favor by ignoring pages two and three of the manual and leaving of them unread."

Alfred C. Giovetti for Compute! said "A good shoot-'em up with all the bells and whistles, Xenocide doesn't allow for saving games. You may forgive this deficiency when you watch the colorful graphics scroll effortlessly. This one's for arcade addicts of all sorts, but especially trigger-happy xenophobes."

InCider magazine rated the Apple IIGS version 4 stars, stating, "The finest graphics and absolutely finest scrolling and animation of the year."
