= Power Pete =

1995 video game

- Developer: Pangea Software
- Publisher: MacPlay
- Platform: Classic Mac OS, Windows, Linux
- Release: August 8, 1995
- Genre: Run and gun
- Mode: Single-player

Power Pete is an overhead view 2D run and gun video game developed by Pangea Software and published by Interplay under the MacPlay brand name. It was released in 1995 and packaged with Mac OS 7 on new Macintosh Performa computers. The player's character is an action figure named Power Pete who has to save the fuzzy bunnies of the doll department from the bad toys while progressing through the fifteen levels of the game.

It won Best Arcade Game of the Year for 1995 from Macworld, and was a runner-up for MacUser's 1995 Best Action Game award.

== Plot ==
Power Pete is an action figure residing in a toy store. After the store closes, all of the toys come to life and chaos ensues. A group of plush rabbits escape from their bin and scatter throughout the store, helpless against the hordes of the more dangerous toys. The only one able to save them is the most popular toy in the store, the action figure Power Pete. Power Pete begins a crusade to try to find and save the rabbits. The other toys in the store, whose sales have been eclipsed by those of Power Pete, are less than happy to see the action figure and spend the game trying to hinder his efforts. Power Pete is aided however by the variety of weapon accessories designed for the Power Pete model that are found throughout the store.

== Gameplay ==
Since the game is based on the premise of being inside a toy store, the game levels correspond to departments in the context of geographics. Each level is further divided into three sections. The number of departments a player sees is dependent on the difficulty level setting. While only three departments are available on easy, four are available on medium, and all five can be played on hard.

The player moves about each area shooting bad toys and rescuing fuzzy bunnies. Fuzzy bunnies are rescued by walking up to them. Once Power Pete rescues all the fuzzy bunnies the player can move on to the next area. The harder levels and departments have more powerful weapons and more resilient toys. When a bad toy is defeated, it explodes showering confetti and jawbreakers, which can be collected like coins in Super Mario Bros. Sometimes a power-up will appear where the destroyed toy used to be. This can be either ammo or a special power-up. Weapons and ammo aren't collected separately in the game, so having ammo means having the weapon. Special power-ups have temporary effects and include "fire in the hole" (many small explosions everywhere), invulnerability, an expanding ring of fire, an enemy freezer, or superspeed. The jawbreakers and power-ups created upon destruction of a toy disappear after a few seconds.

There are power-ups spread throughout the different areas of each department that won't disappear until activated. Power-ups activate immediately when Power Pete walks over them. There is a fuzzy bunny radar screen that shows the position of nearby bunnies relative to the player, although the lay out of the game map makes it extremely difficult to reach some otherwise nearby bunnies. Unless the game is set to the easy difficulty setting there are doors or barriers marked with colored dots in each area. The player must collect correspondingly colored keys spread around each area to unlock them. Keys are picked up like other power-ups. Collected keys display in a special section of the status bar until they are used, at which point they disappear. The keys for each department look different in each department. They are, in order from first to last: hammers, keys, bombs, tickets, or radio controls.

Power Pete starts out with four health hearts per life. Each time Power Pete is hit by a bad toy, he loses a heart. The number of starting lives varies depending on the difficulty setting the player chose at the beginning of the game. Power Pete can replenish his health by eating food power-ups that are found throughout the game, one heart per-power up. Food can't be picked up if Power Pete is already at full health. If the player collects 200 or more jawbreakers in an area Power Petes maximum health hearts per life will increase by one heart, up to a maximum of eight, at the beginning of the next area or department. Extra lives are gained by finding hidden "FREE DUDE!" Power Pete action figure power-ups and by reaching certain score thresholds. Points are awarded during gameplay for shooting bad toys. Upon completion of an area, points are awarded for jawbreakers and fuzzy bunnies collected in that area.

Power Pete includes a variety of weapons available to the player. Each has its own advantages and drawbacks.

== Reception ==
The 1996 edition of The Macintosh Bible called Power Pete "truly pleasurable" and "a great deal of fun". Writing for Computer Games Strategy Plus, Peter Smith remarked, "Mac owners don't have a lot of these full screen, fast paced arcade games to choose from, but even if they did I'd still give Power Pete a vigorous thumbs up."

== Re-release ==
Pangea regained the rights to Power Pete in 2001 and re-released it in upgraded form as shareware with the name Mighty Mike, also providing a demo version of the game available to download. Afterwards the developers decided to make the game entirely free through the public release of the product key to unlock the full version of Mighty Mike on the official game's website. In 2021, the source code was released and remastered for modern computers.
