= Nanosaur 2: Hatchling =

2004 video game

- Developer(s): Pangea Software
- Publisher(s): Pangea Software
- Platform(s): Mac OS X, Windows, iOS
- Release: 2004
- Genre(s): Third-person shooter
- Mode(s): Single-player, multiplayer

Nanosaur 2: Hatchling (or just Nanosaur 2) is a continuation of the original Nanosaur storyline. It was released in 2004 by Pangea Software. Nanosaur 2 is the first stereoscopic game released for the Mac.

== Story ==
Nanosaur 2 takes place shortly after the original Nanosaur, assuming that it has been completed successfully, when valuable dinosaur eggs are now in the hands of the Nanosaur race. However, an unnamed rebel group of Nanosaurs steal the eggs to create a fighting force against Earth. One Pteranodon egg is left behind, and it is the eponymous hatchling that becomes the player's avatar for the game. The objectives are to recover the lost eggs from the rebel group.

== Gameplay ==
A screenshot of Nanosaur 2 on the Macintosh.

The objectives are to recover the lost eggs (somehow there are multiples of each type of egg) from the rebel group. The main weapon is a lethal shriek made by said Pteranodon, but there are other weapons which may be found during the course of the game, including a defensive force-field. This game is much larger than the original. There is no time limit. There are three levels rather than one, each with its own layout, music, challenges and environment. The game does not name on what planets the dinosaurs are, although it does state that they are not on Earth. The entire game can be played in 3D using anaglyphic imagery. The environments for each level, in order they are played, follow below.

1. A redwood forest planet, with no particularly unusual geography. Basic enemies such as dromaeosaurs, brachiosaurs and laser-shooting robots appear in this level. The dromaeosaurs may jump out at your avatar, but the brachiosaurs don't actually attack it, they just lumber around.
2. A desert planet (pictured), covered with odd crystalline structures, tornadoes and surface lava.
3. The third and final level is a swamp planet (shown on cheat window) with strange plants and obstacles. These include giant jumping worms, poisonous gases and Rhamphorhynchus, along with the basic enemies.

There is also a multiplayer option for use on the same computer; the software does not support games over the internet. There are six two-player levels and three missions, thus two levels each. The missions are racing, capture the eggs and battle.

== Release ==
Nanosaur 2 was released for Microsoft Windows PCs. It is published by Ideas from the Deep. Both games were packaged with some new Macintosh computers, like many of Pangea Software's products. Despite Universal Binaries being released for both titles, Apple has not continued to bundle either title with their new line of Intel-based Macintosh systems. In October 2008, Pangea Software released a port of Nanosaur 2 to the iPhone and iPod Touch. The iOS version featured motion controls and online multiplayer, and lacked local co-op, but was otherwise the same as the Mac version. On December 19, 2022, a free updated and enhanced version was released on Windows, MacOS, and Linux by Iliyas Jorio, with permission from Pangea Software.

== Reception ==
Reception

Review scores
Publication	Score
IGN	5.6/10 (iOS)
Macworld	4/5
Inside Mac Games	6.75/10
Slide to Play	2/4 (iOS)

== See also ==
- List of stereoscopic video games
- Stereoscopic video game
