= TinyGrab =

Screenshot sharing software

- Original author(s): Chris Leydon
- Developer(s): Keyone Productions
- Initial release: April 2009
- Stable release: 2.04 / July 27, 2011
- Type: Image hosting service
- Website: tinygrab.com

TinyGrab was a screenshot sharing tool for Windows, Mac and iOS. The tool allowed a user to take a screenshot and automatically upload it to their servers. The URL would directly be copied to the user's clipboard, allowing them to paste the link in an email, blog post, Twitter, or an instant messaging application.

== History ==
TinyGrab was created in April 2009 by Chris Leydon, when he attended Staffordshire University in the United Kingdom. The first version of TinyGrab was only able to run on the Mac OS X operating system. Later, TinyGrab released an application that was able to run on Microsoft Windows. TinyGrab was released for the iPhone on 26 May 2010.

TinyGrab was one of the original applications featured in the MacHeist nanoBundle in November 2009 and offered as a free download for a limited time.

In March 2010, TinyGrab was profiled in Macworld Magazine.

In May 2010, TinyGrab appealed to its users for help with funding the project in order to keep it alive.

In 2011, TinyGrab's servers were hacked. This compromised the product's code base and led to speculation about the developer's financial future.

In July 2011, TinyGrab announced they had been purchased by US developers, Company 52, and claimed that the product was now secure.

In July 2016, the TinyGrab website went offline and stopped all services without any messages to buyers.
