= Harley's Humongous Adventure =

1993 video game

- North American box art
- Developer: Visual Concepts
- Publishers: NA: Hi Tech Expressions; JP: Altron
- Composer: Brian Schmidt
- Platform: Super NES
- Release: NA: February 1993; JP: October 28, 1994
- Genre: Platform
- Mode: Single-player

Harley's Humongous Adventure is a 1993 platform video game developed by Visual Concepts for the Super Nintendo Entertainment System. It was originally funded by publisher Electronic Arts, but eventually published by Hi Tech Expressions.

== Gameplay ==
Screenshot of a fly vomiting onto the player character.

The player controls Harley, a man in a green suit who has shrunk himself to the size of a bar of soap. Harley's mission is to gather the parts of his shrinking machine to return himself to normal size. Harley advances through the levels, picking up items such as tacks, rubberbands, and marbles. Harley adventures through his lab, where the initial incident occurs, his kitchen, his toy room, where the player pilots a toy tank by himself, his bathroom, and other stages.

Enemies include flies, bees, and ants. Players must avoid such enemy attacks as the flies vomiting overhead. The main boss is a deformed rat that tries to jump on Harley, and after each encounter utilizes a household item for the limb he had lost in the previous encounter.

== Development ==
Visually, the game utilizes a mix of pixel art for the stage backgrounds, the menus and most objects, and digitized clay animation models for all characters. The clay animation was produced by A-OK Animation, who had also worked on Claymates, another Super NES game featuring a somewhat similar graphical style.

The game was programmed, and designed in part, by Brian Greenstone of Pangea Software. This programmer previously wrote games for the Apple IIGS computer, which happens to share the same 65C816 microprocessor as the Super NES.

The box art was created for EA by veteran gaming illustrator Marc Ericksen. It features Harley blasting out of the kitchen sink, holding a red plastic push pin for scale reference.

== Reception ==
Upon its release Harley's Humongous Adventure received mixed reviews. Overall critics praised the game for its creative mini world and beautiful graphics. However many found that the game was very easy. Four different critics reviewed this game. The first critic, Martin Alessi wrote “a great original action game” The gameplay is interesting but the game is just too easy. Another critic, Sushi-X agreed with this. They said “the obstacles are easily avoided, and finishing levels is simple.” However the obstacles are easy to dodge and the levels are easy to complete. Steve Harris, an editor for the game said “I didn't think the game had a great concept.” Ed Semrad was the only positive review. He said “The graphics are very clear. The backgrounds look lifelike. There are lots of power ups to play with. Whilst it may be slightly easy for experienced players it is still worth a go.” GamePro gave the game a 16.5/20 before it was released in North America. Super Play, a British magazine gave the game a 69% whilst Super Action gave it a much higher score of 89%.

Reception

Aggregate score
Aggregator	Score
GameRankings	63.63% (4 reviews)

Review scores
Publication	Score
AllGame	3.5/5
Computer and Video Games	45/100
Electronic Gaming Monthly	28/40
Famitsu	21/40
GameFan	72.75% (Note: In GameFan's review, four critics scored Harley's Humongous Adventure differently: 80%, 77%, 69%, and 65%.)
GamePro	16.5/20
Mega Fun	58/100
Nintendo Power	14.1/20
Super Play	69%
Total!	45%
Video Games (DE)	77%
VideoGames & Computer Entertainment	8/10
Control	60%
Electronic Games	83%
Super Action	89%
