= Villa Welgelegen =

Neo-classical building in Haarlem, Netherlands

Coordinates: 52°22′18″N 4°37′52″E

Villa Welgelegen after restoration in 2009, with the bronze Laocoön and His Sons

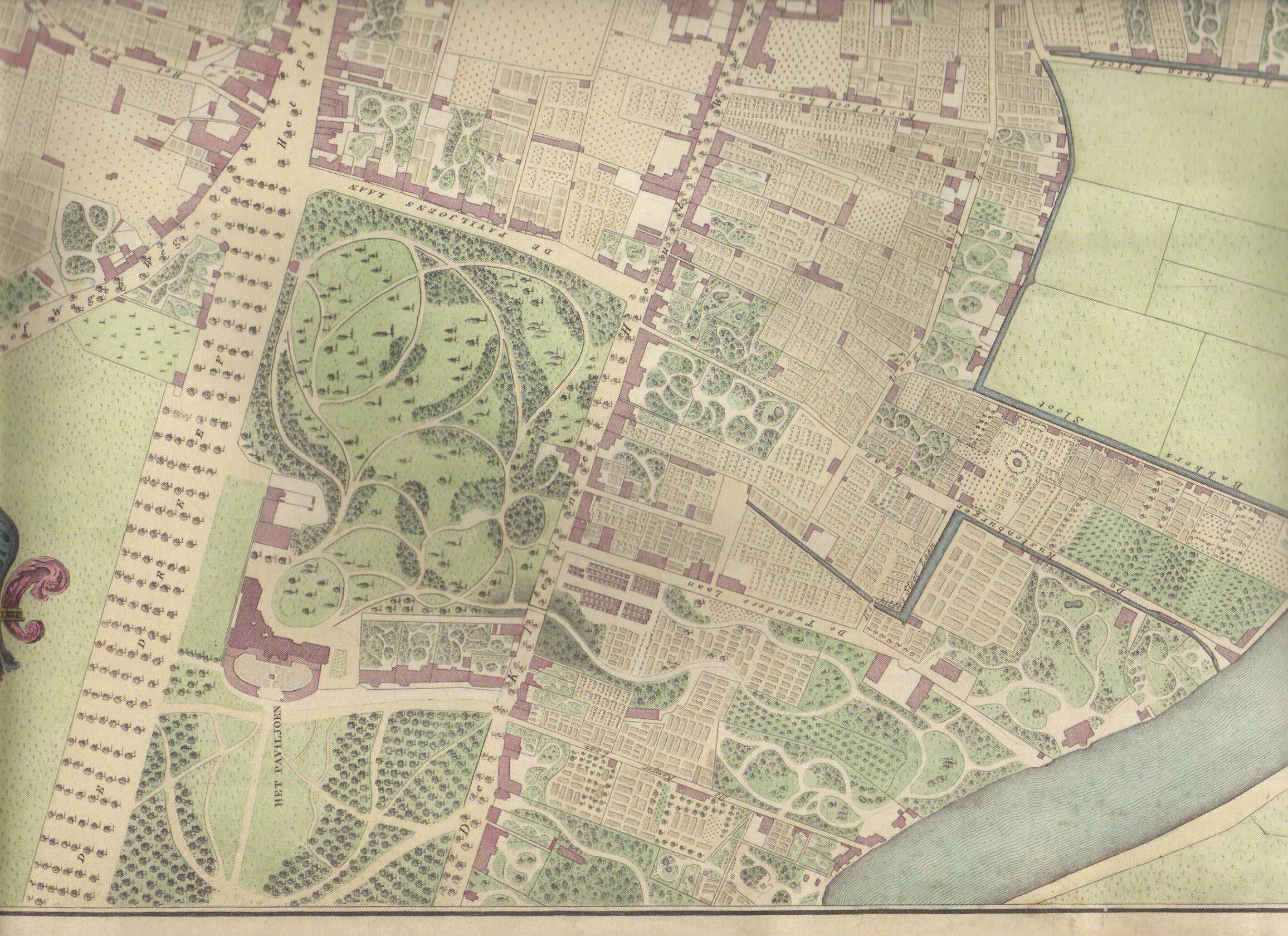
Situation map of Welgelegen in 1827.

Villa Welgelegen is a historical building in Haarlem, the Netherlands, which currently houses the offices of the provincial executives of North Holland. Located at the north end of a public park in the city, it is an example of neoclassical architecture, designed by Abraham van der Hart and unusual for its style in the Netherlands.

== History ==
It was built by Henry Hope of the famous family banking company Hope & Co. of Amsterdam, from 1785 to 1789 as a summer home to replace the already quite impressive structure that he purchased there in 1769. From 1769 onwards, Henry Hope purchased more and more adjoining land in order to fulfill the plans he had for a great palace and picture gallery. During the five-year period that the construction took place, it was the talk of the town. No one had seen such a large summer home. To give an impression of the size compared to his contemporaries, see the map from 1827 showing the size of Welgelegen and its gardens (that go much further south than the map shows) compared to its neighboring summer homes of Amsterdam mayors and bankers.

== Local politics ==
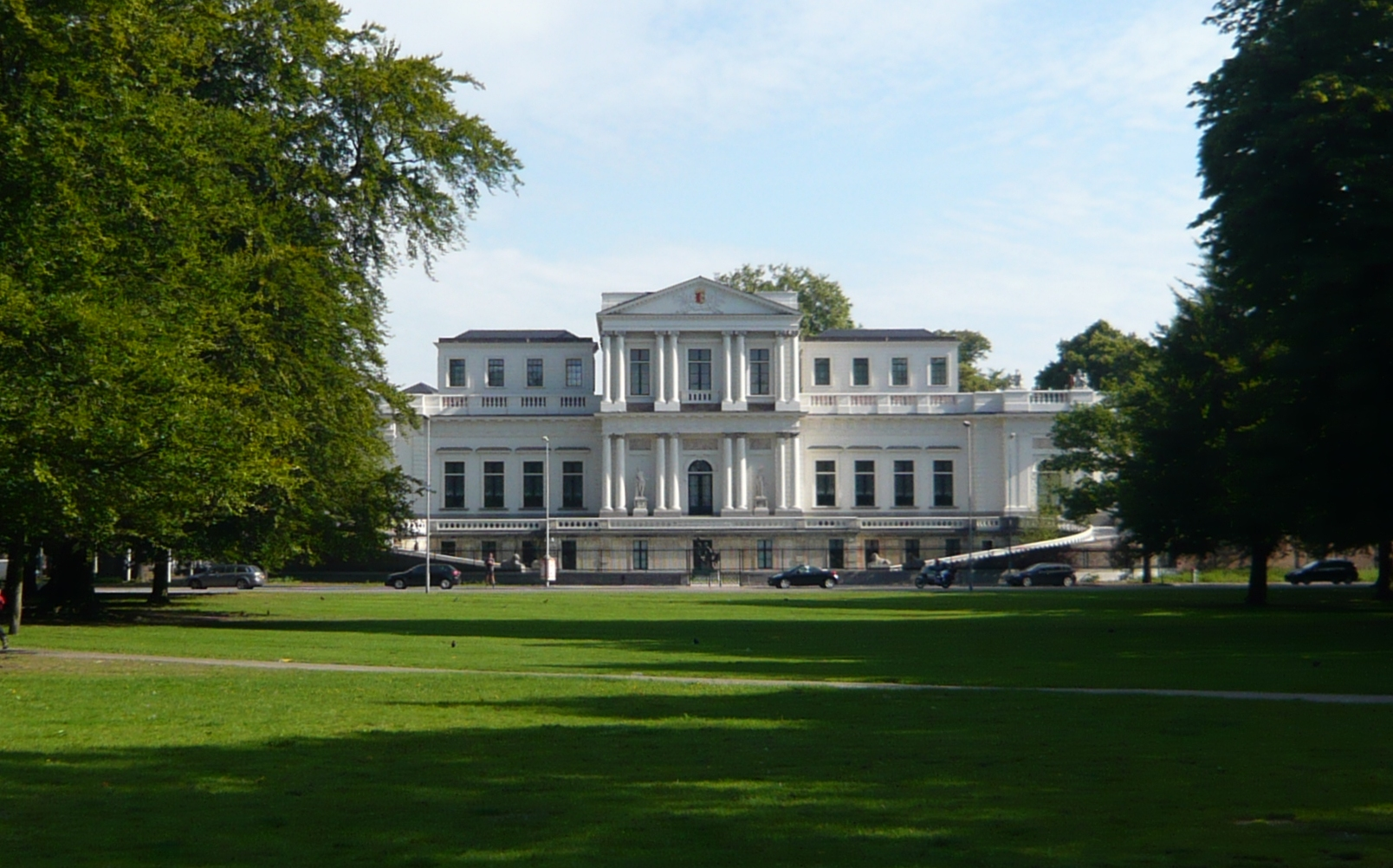
Front of Villa Welgelegen on the Paviljoenslaan, Haarlem

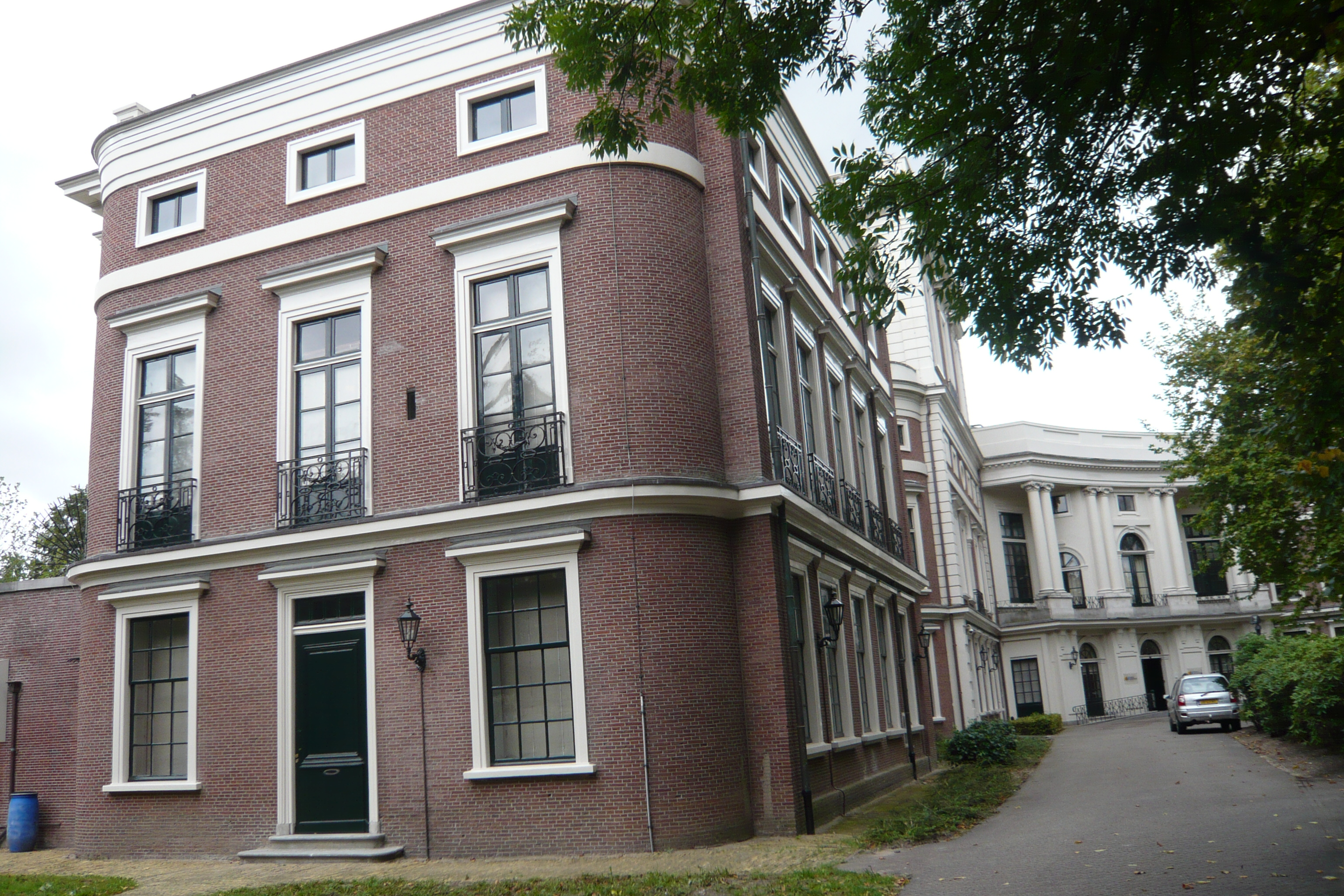
East entrance to Welgelegen, and the private residence of Henry Hope when in Haarlem. In the back on the right is the rear entrance (today the only entrance).

Henry Hope was so influential that he persuaded the Haarlem local government to redesign the public park Frederickspark and he persuaded the Heemstede local government to redesign the Haarlemmerhout, both of which adjoined his property. Henry Hope collected many paintings and sculptures and had renowned artisans design the interior. He had many famous visitors to this palace, including William V of Orange, who visited with his wife, Princess Wilhelmina of Prussia, and Thomas Jefferson in 1788. Holland was the first country to recognize the United States as a country in 1782, and attracted many US visitors looking to trade with the wealthy merchants of Amsterdam, that was at that time the financial center of Europe.

== Henry Hope's departure ==
Before he could complete his vision of expanding the Welgelegen gardens to the Spaarne river, Henry Hope left Welgelegen only 5 years after the main house was completed. In 1794 Henry Hope fled to England before the French revolutionary forces, taking most of his art collection with him. He transferred the property to his nephew John Williams Hope who remained behind in Amsterdam to see to the family banking business. John Hope carried on the Hope & co. family business in Amsterdam together with Alexander Baring and Adriaan van der Hoop, young partners in the firm. In 1800 Henry Hope became influential together with his London friend Francis Baring in financing the Louisiana Purchase. On behalf of the French government, Baring and Hope sold US government bonds worth $11.25 million in 1804, more than a year after the treaty was signed. It is known as the largest land transaction in history.

== French occupation ==
John Williams Hope sold the villa in 1808 to Napoleon's brother Louis Bonaparte who had just been named King of Holland. Louis, or Ludwig as he called himself, loved Holland and enjoyed a good reputation among the people. He gave the villa its current name 'Paviljoen Welgelegen'. Louis Napoleon enjoyed his stay there, but left in a hurry in 1810 when he was forced to abdicate the throne by his brother Napoleon, who felt he was being too 'nice' to his subjects. His brother Napoleon then annexed Holland, making the King function redundant. Three years later after the War of 1812 Welgelegen became the property of the government of the Netherlands.

== Museum Welgelegen ==
From 1814 to her death in 1828, Princess Wilhelmina of Prussia, who remembered the villa from her marriage, kept the villa as a summer palace and opened it to the public as a museum of modern art. After Wilhelmina died, Welgelegen housed many museums that later moved to Amsterdam or Leiden. In 1885 the "Museum van Levende Nederlandsche Meesters" was closed (especially since most of the "levende meesters" or living masters had since deceased), but the "Koloniaal Museum" (1871-1923) and the "Museum voor Kunstnijverheid" (1877-1926) remained open. When the Frans Hals Museum moved to its present location on the Klein Heiligland, the "Fotografisch Museum" (1913-ca.1918) was opened here (now called Spaarnestad Photo).

== Current function ==
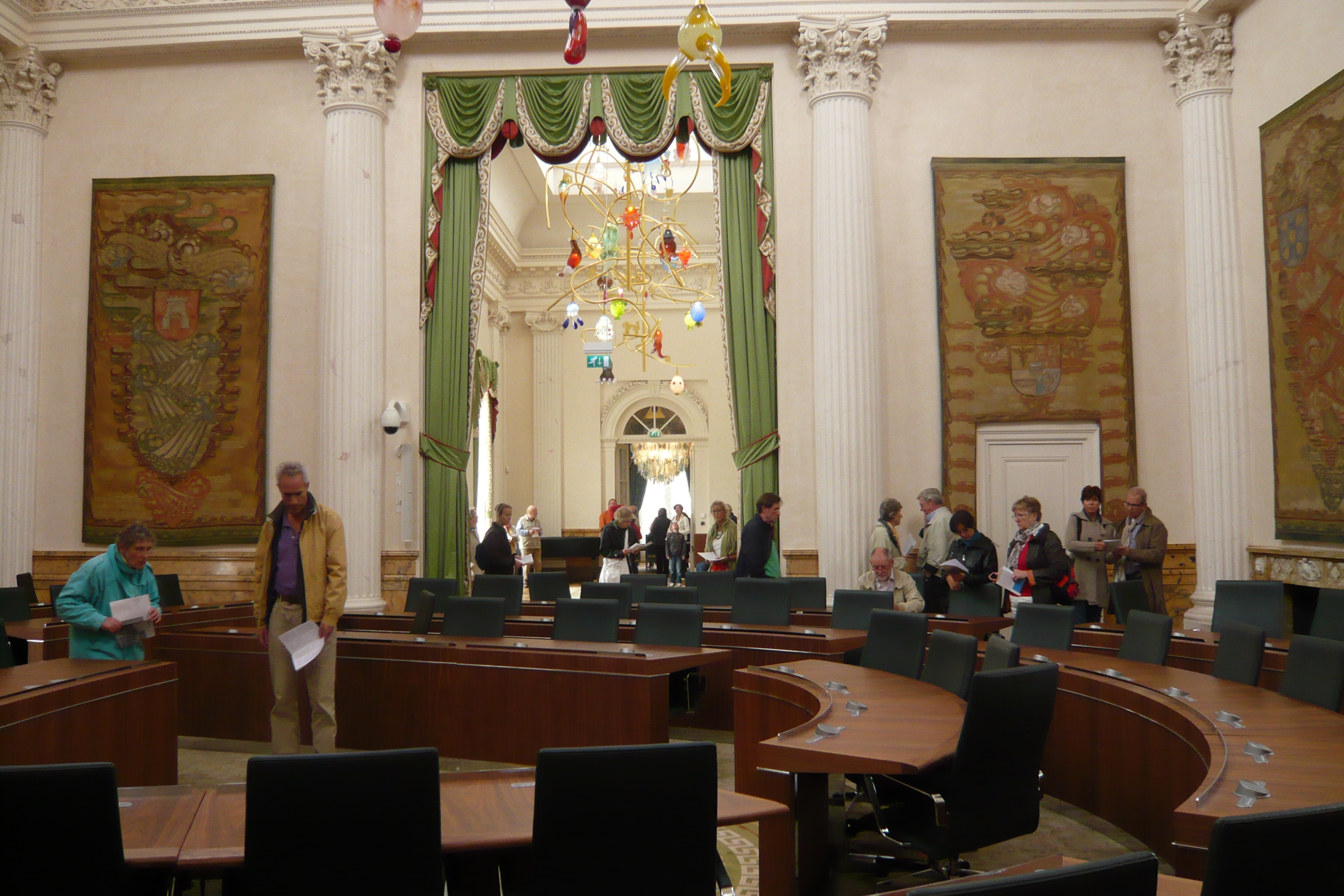
Interior showing the official meeting room of the Province of North Holland.

Unlike Teylers Museum, that was built at the same time, Welgelegen lost its museum function and has been in use since 1930 by the Provinciale Staten as the seat of government for the Province of North Holland. Since the last restoration in 2009, the private park grounds and some of the rooms are open to the public during office hours, while the larger meeting rooms are open to the public for walking tours only one day of the year on Monumenten Dag.
