= A Chronicle of Tahrir Square =

- Film poster
- Directed by: Nour Zaki
- Written by: Nour Zaki
- Starring: Abbey Aziz; Taylor Ann Trad; Mike Batayeh; Vargha Davari; Fouad Hajji; Mohamed Kholai; Greg Lucey; Will Rian
- Release date: 25 January 2014
- Running time: 11 minutes
- Language: English

A Chronicle of Tahrir square is a 2014 American-Egyptian independent historic short film written and directed by Nour Zaki. The film won at the 2014 Women's voices now film festival and was screened at the Chinese theater in Hollywood as a part of the Holly-shorts film festival. The movie sheds the light on the events that occurred in Tahrir Square on 2 February 2011 and the clashes between the anti and pro Mubarak crowd.

== Plot ==
During the climax of the 2011 Egyptian revolution, a young Egyptian girl must go through the violent square to save her father.

== Awards ==
- Women's voices now film festival 2014 - Winner
