= Pangea Software =

American video game developer

Pangea Software, Inc.
- Type: Private
- Industry: Video games
- Founded: December 1987; 38 years ago
- Headquarters: Austin, Texas
- Key people: Brian Greenstone
- Website: pangeasoft.net

Pangea Software is a video game developer based in Austin, Texas, owned and operated by Brian Greenstone. The company began with Apple IIGS games in 1987, then moved to Macintosh and later iOS. Pangea found its primary success with a series of 3D games, when 3D hardware accelerators first began to appear on the Macintosh, beginning with Nanosaur in 1998 and extending into the early 2000s. Bugdom was included with new iMac models. In addition to games, Pangea also provides panoramic photography services.

== History ==
Pangea Software began as a developer of Apple IIGS games, with the first (and most notable) being Xenocide, which was commercially published by Micro Revelations in 1989. Between 1989 and 1990, they introduced so-called "24 Hour Games" shareware, a proof of concept of what could be accomplished in a limited time.

In 1991, Pangea switched to Macintosh development; notable titles included Power Pete, Nanosaur, Bugdom, Cro-Mag Rally, and Otto Matic. In 1995, Pangea made a deal with Apple to begin bundling their games with Macintosh computers; this deal ended in 2006, when Apple transitioned to Intel CPUs and decided to stop bundling third-party software.

Since 2008, the company has mostly ceased developing Mac games and instead chosen to focus on iOS games, due to the latter becoming a more lucrative market.

== Games ==
=== Apple IIGS ===
- Xenocide (1989)
- Grackle (1989)
- Copy Killers (1989)
- Quadronome (1989)
- Senseless Violence: Survival of the Fetus (1989)
- Orbizone (1989)
- Senseless Violence II: You Use, You Die (1990)
- Cosmocade, with: Journey to Calibus and Naxos (1990)

=== Macintosh ===
- Firefall Arcade (1993)
- Bloodsuckers (1993)
- Power Pete / Mighty Mike (1995)
- Gerbils (1996)
- Weekend Warrior (1996)
- Nanosaur (1998)
- Bugdom (1999)
- Cro-Mag Rally (2000)
- Otto Matic (2001)
- Bugdom 2 (2002)
- Enigmo (2003)
- Billy Frontier (2003)
- Nanosaur 2: Hatchling (2004)
- Enigmo 2 (2006)
- Pangea Arcade, with: Firefall, Warheads, and Nucleus (2006)
- Leaf on the Wind (2014)

=== Published ===
- Runic (Macintosh, 2007), developed by CodeTurbine

== Other products ==
In 1990, Xenocide was ported to the IBM PC by Manley & Associates without the involvement of Pangea Software.

In 1993, Brian Greenstone programmed and co-designed Harley's Humongous Adventure for the Super Nintendo Entertainment System. In 2004, Greenstone wrote The Ultimate Game Programming Guide, a book about programming a 3D game engine for Mac OS X.

Since 2006, Pangea has also provided a panoramic photography service, allowing customers to have a 360˚ view of an area that can be navigated and interacted with via a cursor.
