= Camera Obscura (2015 film) =

- Directed by: Nour Zaki
- Written by: Nour Zaki
- Produced by: Nour Zaki; Khaled Abol Naga; Sofy Lotfy
- Starring: Khaled Abol Naga; Ahmed Tangy; Mohamed Abdol Azeem
- Release date: May 9, 2015
- Running time: 3 minutes

Camera Obscura is a 2015 Egyptian independent historic short film written and directed by Nour Zaki. Starring Khaled Abol Naga, the film depicts the story of Al Hazen (Al Hassan Ibn Al Haytham’s) discovery of image reflection while being held in prison.

== Plot ==
Accused of madness and jailed, AL-Hassan Ibn-Al Haitham (AL HAZEN) battles to adapt to his captivity till he makes an unexpected discovery that will change the course of human history.

== Awards ==
- Boston Global Film festival - Nominated
- Visionaria film festival- festival symbol
