= Camera Café =

Camera Café may refer to:

- Caméra Café, a 2001–2004 French sitcom with several international versions, including:
  - Camera Café (Italian TV series), 2003-2017, co-starring Paolo Kessisoglu
  - Camera Café (Spanish TV series), 2005–2009
  - Camera Café (Philippine TV series), 2007–2009
