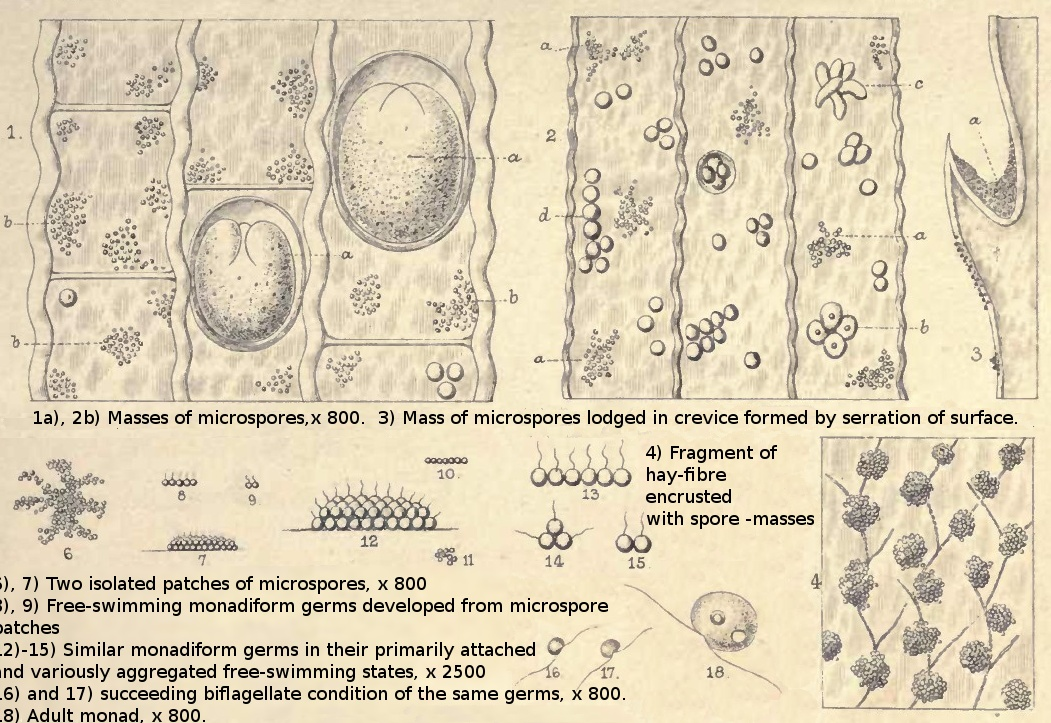

Scientific classification
- Domain: Eukaryota
- (unranked): incertae sedis
- Genus: Kamera (O.F.Müller) Patterson & Zölffel, 1991
- Species: K. lens

Binomial name
- Kamera lens (O.F.Müller) Patterson & Zölffel, 1991

Synonyms
- Monas lens O.F.Müller (1773); Heteromita lens (O.F.Müller) W.S.Kent (1881); Bodo lens (O.F.Müller) Klebs (1892); Heteromastix lens (O.F.Müller) H.M.Woodcock (1916)

= Kamera lens =

Unicellular organism in the genus Kamera

Kamera lens is a unicellular, flagellate organism and the only species in the genus Kamera. Though the species has been known for centuries, it is poorly understood. Its systematic position within the Eukaryota is uncertain.

== Anatomy, nutrition and reproduction ==
Kamera lens is a free-living, swimming, heterotrophic organism. It is 6 to 7 by 2.5 to 3 micrometers on average and ovate. The base of both its long flagella is below the tip (subapical). There is only one nucleus. Ultrastructural characters are not known.

Kamera lens lives as a saprobiont and can be found in hay infusions. William Saville Kent reported spore-masses of it in such an infusion in 1880.

== Taxonomy and history ==
The first valid description (as Monas lens) was published by Otto Friedrich Müller in 1773. William Saville Kent placed it in the genus Heteromita in 1880. Edwin Klebs moved it to Bodo in 1892, but this was rejected by H.M. Woodcock, who removed the species from Bodo and made it the type species of Heteromastix. David J. Patterson and Michael Zölffel found Woodcock's description to be insufficient and established the genus Kamera for Kamera lens in 1991, creating a play on words in the binomial's resemblance to "camera lens". Due to lacking ultrastructural or molecular biological data, the species' rank is uncertain; thus it is placed as incertae sedis in the Eukaryota.

This species has been provisionally placed in the Ochrophyta.
