= The Camera (American magazine) =

American photography periodical 1897-1953

The Camera: A Practical Monthly Magazine for Photographers was originally issued by the Columbia Photographic Society of Philadelphia under various subtitles, and continued publication until July 1953.

== Columbia Photographic Society ==
Henry S. Marsteller started the club in his Columbia Avenue apartment in 1889, and it quickly grew from 12 to more than 130 members, so that in less than a decade the Society relocated to four-story building at 1811 North Broad Street. The main interest was in photography which was catered with six darkrooms and a sky-lit studio, but there was a strong social element to activities. Members of the club's ‘Wheelman’ committee organised regular weekend cycling and photographing excursions to Perkiomen, the Brandywine and Atlantic City and the resulting images were shown in lantern-slide shows accompanied by music.

== The magazine ==
Camera, originally the Society's gossip sheet, soon became a magazine and achieved national circulation. Its articles catered to the amateur, being largely concerned with technical considerations and avoided the controversies over Pictorialism that occupied more serious publications of the period, though it reproduced work by accomplished Pictorialists, such as Leonard Misonne and Robert S. Redfield.

Early editors included, from July 1897–June 1899, John Curtis Jr. and others; from July 1899 the editor was Frank Virginius Chambers (1861–1940), who published numbers of technical books on photography, joined by John Bartlett from January 1901–January 1904, and others. From Vol. 12, no. 3 (Mar. 1908) the imprint was published by The Camera Publishing Co.

In 1923 the magazine merged with The Photographic Journal of America (the latter formerly Wilson's photographic magazine) but retained The Camera in its title. Chambers also edited the Bulletin of photography: the weekly magazine for the professional photographer (Aug. 14, 1907–June 24, 1931, formerly titled the St. Louis and Canadian photographer), which from 1931 also merged with The Camera.
