= WingNuts: Temporal Navigator =

- Developer: Freeverse Software
- Publisher: Freeverse Software
- Platforms: Classic Mac OS, Mac OS X, Windows
- Release: 2001
- Genre: Shooter game
- Mode: Single-player

WingNuts: Temporal Navigator is a 2001 top-down multi-directional shooter for Macintosh made by Freeverse Software. It was inspired by arcade games Time Pilot and 1942.

In WingNuts, the player navigates an aircraft around a two-dimensional map, and travels through time to fight robot planes and defeat the game's antagonist, Baron Von Schtopwatch. To progress, the player must destroy hostile aircraft and ground vehicles, while avoiding hazards and picking up "goodies". At the end of each level, a final boss appears, whose defeat unlocks the next level.

Freeverse released a sequel, WingNuts 2: Raina's Revenge in mid-2006, and subsequently made the original game available on their website for free.

== Gameplay ==
WingNuts screenshot

The player controls a pilot in a series of airborne missions, hopping to different geographical locations and time periods in search of the villainous Baron von Schtopwatch. The player's objective is to destroy enemy fleets, bomb ground installations, and reach level-specific objectives. Floating power-ups grant extra guns, or boosts to the player's s fuel and shields. The game features a variety of vintage and modern aircraft for the player to use, with the ability to collect and upgrade them as the player progresses through the game. The player is supported by an airborne aircraft carrier where they can land to swap their plane with any other unlocked plane. Once a player has destroyed all enemy fleet and ground weaponry, a boss character appears, whose defeat unlocks the next level. There are 30 levels in total.

== Development ==
WingNuts was originally released for Windows and classic Mac OS. On Mac OS X, the game's support for game controllers was non-functional until Freeverse released a patch in 2002, making WingNuts officially compatible with Mac OS X. WingNuts's game engine was coded by Freeverse employee Mark Andersson.

== Reception ==
Reception

Review scores
Publication	Score
Macworld	5/5
Inside Mac Games	7.5/10
MacGamer	85%

MacAddict's Ian Sammis said WingNuts was "the sort of game you can easily play through the night, regaining awareness only when the glare from the rising sun finally causes you to lose a life." Macworld's Peter Cohen said the game was "fun and extraordinarily well executed", and praised its graphics, sound effects and gameplay.

=== Awards ===
WingNuts won Macworld's 2002 Best Old-School Arcade Game award, and was the only game in Macworld's 2002 Hall of Fame to receive a five-mouse rating.
