= WingNuts 2 =

2006 video game

WingNuts 2: Raina's Revenge
- Developer(s): Freeverse Software
- Publisher(s): Freeverse Software
- Platform(s): Mac OS X
- Release: June 2006
- Genre(s): Multi-directional shooter
- Mode(s): Single-player

WingNuts 2: Raina's Revenge is a 2006 top-down multi-directional shooter for Mac OS X developed and published by Freeverse Software. The player takes control of several historical and fictitious aircraft as they travel through time to stop Baron von Schtopwatch.

WingNuts 2 is the sequel to WingNuts: Temporal Navigator; both were inspired by arcade games Time Pilot and 1942. WingNuts 2 also ships with a scenario editor.

== Gameplay ==
Screenshot of WingNuts 2

The player controls a pilot in a series of airborne missions, hopping to different geographical locations and time periods in search of the villainous Baron von Schtopwatch and the mysterious Raina. The player's objective is to destroy enemy fleets, bomb ground installations, and reach level-specific objectives. Floating "Goodies" grant power-ups, like extra guns, or boosts to the player's s fuel and shields. The game features a variety of vintage and modern aircraft for the player to use, with the ability to collect and upgrade them as the player progresses through the game. The player is supported by an airborne aircraft carrier, the Temporal Command carrier, where the player can land to swap their plane with any other unlocked plane. Once a player has destroyed all enemy fleet and ground weaponry, a boss character appears, whose defeat unlocks the next level.

== Development ==
The game's sound effects were created by Freeverse designer Chelsea Bridge.

== Reception ==
Reception

Review scores
| Publication | Score |
|---|---|
| Macworld | 4.5/5 stars |
| LudoMac | 8.5/10 |
| CNET | 5/5 stars |
| Applelinks | 5/5 stars |

Macworld's Peter Cohen praised WingNuts 2's gameplay, graphics, soundtrack, and sense of humor, and called it "a fantastic sequel" to the original game.

=== Awards ===
In 2006, WingNuts 2 was the runner-up for the Game of the Year Apple Design Award and received Macworld''s Eddy Editor's Choice award. The next near, Macworld named it Best Game Worth Waiting For in its 2007 Game Hall of Fame.
