= NanoMission =

- Promotional image from NanoMission
- Developer(s): PlayGen
- Platform(s): Microsoft Windows

NanoMission is a serious game series made by PlayGen for Wellcome Trust and FEI to teach the player about the world of nanomedicine. There are four downloadable modules available, each teaching different concepts related to nanotechnology. The gameplay varies greatly between the different modules in the series offering a wide variety of gameplay.

== Research and development ==
A board of four scientists oversees the development of NanoMission to assure the game remains based in fact. The science board of NanoMission is made up of:

- Mark Welland FRS, FREng, the Professor of Nanotechnology, Director of the IRC in Nanotechnology and Director of the Nanoscience at the University of Cambridge.
- Richard Jones FRS, the Professor of Physics at the University of Sheffield, the author of the book Soft Machines and a frequent writer on nanotechnology.
- Kostas Kostarelos FRSM, the Chair of Nanomedicine and Head for the Centre for Drug Delivery Research at the School of Pharmacy, University of London.
- Wolfgang Luther, the head of nanotechnologies at VDI The Association of German Engineers, a non-profit organization of 126,000 engineers and natural scientists and author of numerous VDI and EU reports on nanotechnology.

An educational advisory board is currently being formed to help teachers be able to better utilize NanoMission as part of their curriculum. In the meantime, The Association for Science Education or ASE, The Sector Skills Council for Science, Engineering and Manufacturing Technologies or SEMTA, Science, Engineering, Technology and Matechmatics Network or SETNET and Science, Engineering, Technology and Matechmatics Network or SCENTA, are helping develop NanoMission as an educational aide.

== Modules ==
NanoMission is a series of several related games that can be downloaded and run independently of one another. There is no required order of play for the game modules and the player may play them in any order the player wishes. Each module is different and covers different topics related to nanotechnology.

=== NanoMedicine V1 ===
In this game, the player helps the laboratory aide guide the nanorobot to destroy the cancer in the patient. As the body naturally attempts to expel foreign particles from inside itself, special carrying cases disguised to look like naturally occurring cellular objects such as the vesicle used in the game are used by the robot to hold and carry medicines to help the patient.

At the start of the game, the player is given their choice of three different nanorobots to choose from, each with different amounts of speed, strength and stealth. Speed is the speed of the vessel, stealth is how likely the body is to reject the vessel as a foreign particle, and strength is how well the machine holds up when under attack by the body. This module is played with the mouse and keyboard and is very similar in style to a flight simulation/combat game only played inside the body with dodging blood cells, platelets, and particles instead of dodging enemy fire and attacking cancer cells instead of enemy bases.

=== Nano Medicine V2 ===
In the bloodstream in Nanomedicine V2

In this module the player takes on the role of a scientist attempting to create better nanomedicine and nanomachines. The player designs their own vesicle, then gets to release it into a test body to see how well the new creations help treat lung cancer.

The gameplay is less action-oriented and more strategy-oriented in this module than in V1. The player begins the game by selecting the edit button and using a drag and drop interface similar to that of FloodSim to design a vesicle. The goal is to create a vesicle with the same key signature as the cancer cells that can survive in the body long enough to deliver the medicine to kill the lung cancer. The Strength, Speed and Stealth stats are still in use, but now can be independently controlled and a new "key" mechanic is introduced to replicate delivering the correct medicine to match the cancer type.

Once the player is happy with their selections, the vesicle is injected and the player watches the reactions of their creation with the lungs on several different levels from cellular to full-scale with airflow and blood flow realistically depicted. The player also controls the vesicle to find and destroy the cancer as in V1. If successful, the cancer's health meter falls and the patient is cured.

=== NanoImaging ===
In this module a mad scientist has created and released a new strain of fast-blooming Red Algae that is threatening to wipe out all life in freshwater lakes and streams worldwide. The player takes the role of a scientist attempting to find and isolate the new strain of algae then create a countermeasure using nanotechnology to destroy the invading algae and save the world's lakes and streams. The NanoImaging Module is also sponsored by the FEI Company and features the Phenom scanning electron microscope as one of the tools the player will use to help combat the mad scientist.

In the water with Identified particles in NanoImaging

This is an action game in a style similar to a shooter. The player is represented by a small golden nanorobot that floats on the rapidly changing water currents. Your goal is to identify all the unknown particles (represented by bubbles) by clicking on them with the right mouse button, and to destroy harmful particles once identified by clicking them with the left mouse button. Life is lost when a friendly particle is destroyed, but can be regained by destroying harmful particles.

When a particle is identified, the player is shown a 3d rendered image of the particle, the particle as seen through an electron microscope, a few facts about the identified particle and if the particle is friendly (smiling face) or harmful (skull and crossbones). The identified particles are also added to a gallery so the player can look at them again later if they so wish.

The game is won by identifying all particles, then finding and destroying the harmful red algae in the water.

=== NanoScaling ===
Character Mode of NanoScaling

This module teaches the players the differences in the size of items from a microscopic atom of hydrogen (pico meters) to the sun (gigameters). Players can scroll between the items, or they can have their character shrink or grow to the size of the item pictured to be able to see the items' sizes in perspective.

This game is a learning toy. A scrollbar at the bottom allows the player to scroll between different sizes for comparison and buttons change the mode of view. Common items such as bicycles and people and famous landmarks such as the Eiffel Tower and Mount Everest are used to help the player be able to gain a better understanding of comparative sizes. There also is a Character Mode in which the player's avatar shrinks down to the size of the chosen item to see the other comparative items from a new perspective.
