= In camera (disambiguation) =

In camera is a legal term meaning "in private".

In camera may also refer to:

- In Camera (Arthur & Yu album)
- In Camera (Peter Hammill album)
- In Camera (band), a London-based post-punk band
- In Camera, a duo project of the musicians Christoph Heemann and Timo Van Luyck
- In Camera (film), a 2023 British drama film
- No Exit, Jean-Paul Sartre's existentialist play, as its original title Huis Clos is the French legal term for "in camera"
- In-camera effects or in-camera editing in film and video production
