= Camera obscura (disambiguation) =

A camera obscura (Latin for dark chamber) is a device for projecting an image on a screen, using either a lens or pinhole.

The term may refer to specific large-scale camera obscuras:

- Camera Obscura (San Francisco, California), at the Cliff House, San Francisco
- Camera Obscura, Edinburgh, on the Royal Mile in Edinburgh
- Great Union Camera Obscura, on Douglas Head on the Isle of Man

Camera Obscura may also refer to:

== Film ==
- Camera Obscura (1921 film), silent German film
- Camera Obscura (1997 film), short film featuring Francesco Salvi
- Camera Obscura (2000 film), by Hamlet Sarkissian
- Camera Obscura (2010 film), starring Jack Klugman
- Camera Obscura (2015 film), Egyptian short film
- Camera Obscura (2017 film), American horror film directed by Aaron B. Koontz
- "Camera Obscura", a 1971 episode of Night Gallery

== Literature and publications ==
- Camera Obscura, an 1839 novel by Nicolaas Beets
- Laughter in the Dark (novel), a 1932 novel by Vladimir Nabokov, originally titled, and sometimes translated as, Camera Obscura
- "Camera Obscura", a short story by Basil Copper that was adapted as a 1971 episode of Night Gallery
- Camera Obscura (Rose novel), a 2002 Doctor Who novel by Lloyd Rose
- Camera obscura (Gazvoda novel), a 2006 novel by Nejc Gazvoda
- Camera Obscura, a 2011 novel by Lavie Tidhar
- Camera Obscura, a 1969 short play by Robert Patrick
- Camera Obscura (journal), a feminism, culture and media studies journal

== Music ==
- Camera Obscura (album) by Nico
- Camera Obscura (band), indie pop band from Glasgow
- Camera Obscura (duo), British synth pop band, who had a minor hit in 1983 with the Destitution EP
- Camera Obscura (record label), Australian independent label specializing in psychedelic styles
- "Camera Obscura", the 9th track in Enigma's 2000 album The Screen Behind the Mirror

== Video gaming ==
- Camera Obscura (Fatal Frame), the name of a camera used to exorcise spirits by taking pictures, in the Fatal Frame series

== See also ==
- Pinhole camera
