= XScope =

xScope

- xScope 2.0 showing the Dimensions, Rulers, and Loupe functions, on its About box
- Developers: The Iconfactory; ARTIS Software
- Stable release: 3.2.2 / June 2012; 13 years ago
- Operating system: Mac OS X
- Type: Screen measuring device
- License: Proprietary, Shareware
- Website: iconfactory.com/software/scope

xScope is a utility by The Iconfactory & ARTIS Software that can measure any element displayed on screen. The idea behind the program is that designers can check the size of their work against real-world computer display measurements and be able to measure their work as well.

== Features ==
- Dimensions show the pixel size (for both X and Y dimensions) of any object within a color range under the mouse.
- Rulers measuring pixel size in both X and Y dimensions are shown over the screen and can be rotated 360 degrees.
- Screens overlays common screen resolutions along with the area of webpages visible to common browsers within those resolutions.
- Loupe is an adjustable magnifying glass that shows the specific pixel color under the mouse.
- Guides are vertical and horizontal guide lines displayed over the screen to be used as guides.
- Frames of to custom sizes can shown on-screen.
- Crosshair shows the pixel coordinates of the cursor on the monitor.
