= 3D camera =

3D camera may refer to:

- Range camera, a device which produces a 2D image showing the distance to points in a scene from a specific point.
- Stereo camera, a type of camera with two or more lenses with separate image sensors or film frame for each lens, which allows the camera to simulate human binocular vision, and therefore capture three-dimensional images.

== See also ==
- 3D scanner
- 3D reconstruction from multiple images
- Heightmap
- Laser rangefinder
- Lenticular lens
- Time-of-flight camera
- Vectograph
