= Camera, Camera, Camera =

Manga series

- Cover of the first volume of Camera, Camera, Camera as published by Digital Manga Publishing

カメラ・カメラ・カメラ (Kamera Kamera Kamera)
- Genre: Yaoi
- Manga
- Written by: Kazura Matsumoto
- Published by: Shinshokan
- English publisher: NA: Digital Manga Publishing
- Magazine: Dear+
- Original run: February 28, 2002 – February 28, 2003
- Volumes: 2

Camera, Camera, Camera (Japanese: カメラ・カメラ・カメラ, Hepburn: Kamera Kamera Kamera) is a manga series written and illustrated by Kazura Matsumoto. The series was originally published in Japan by Shinshokan between February 2002, and February 2003. The manga is licensed in North America by Digital Manga Publishing under its Juné imprint, which released the first volume on 24 November 2007, and the second on February 12, 2008. It's about Akira, a teenage boy who loves his stepbrother and is pursued by a photographer, Kaoru.

== Reception ==
The artwork was praised by Mania Entertainment as not showing the characters as unrealistically beautiful. Comic Book Bin praises the "endearing" characters, especially Miyata, who is not portrayed as a "girl-in-the-way". Active Anime describes Camera, Camera, Camera as having "a romping dose of comedy". While Mania Entertainment was initially disappointed at having the storyline of Akira loving his stepbrother resolved so quickly in the second volume, Mania appreciated the focus this allowed on the developing Akira-Kaoru relationship. Comic Book Bin, writing about the second volume, described it as "smooth and entertaining".
