= Camera+ =

Camera app for iPhone

- Developers: Heavy Plumb Apps, Ltd
- Release: June 7, 2010
- Stable release: 23.4.1 / November 6, 2023; 2 years ago
- Operating system: iOS 15.0 or later
- Size: 185 MB
- Type: Photography
- License: Proprietary
- Website: camera.plus

Camera+ is an app for Apple's iOS mobile operating system developed by Heavy Plumb Apps, Ltd. The app serves as an alternative to the standard iOS camera app, primarily adding basic and advanced editing tools (including special effects and lighting filters), an image stabilizer.

Camera+ received generally positive reception; PC Advisor gave the app 4 1/2 stars out of 5 and declared it a "must-have" app for iPhone photographers, praising its advanced editing functionality for allowing users to "[make] poor snaps into great photographs that will wow your friends", making the built-in camera app feel like a pinhole in comparison. Wired gave the app a 9 out of 10, describing it as a "secret weapon" for photographers, and stating that it contained so much functionality that it was "too easy to get lost in the deeply layered menus or forget where you found that killer function the other day." In May 2012, Camera+ was the 10th most popular paid app on the iPhone until then.
