= Nanosaur =

1998 video game

- Developers: Pangea Software (Mac); Ideas From the Deep (Windows)
- Publishers: Pangea Software (Mac); Ideas From the Deep (Windows)
- Producer: Lane Roathe (PC)
- Programmers: Brian Greenstone (Mac); Rebecca Heineman (Windows); Eric Drumbor (Windows); Lane Roathe (Windows)
- Artist: Scott Harper
- Composers: Mike Beckett; Jens Nilsson
- Series: Nanosaur
- Platforms: Macintosh, Windows
- Release: Macintosh: WW: April 6, 1998 (Nanosaur); WW: 2002 (Nanosaur Extreme); Windows: WW: December 22, 2002 (Nanosaur Extreme)
- Genres: Third-person shooter, platformer
- Mode: Single-player

Nanosaur is a platform third-person shooter video game developed by Pangea Software and published by Ideas From the Deep for Mac OS 9 and Microsoft Windows. The player takes on the form of a Nanosaur, a genetically engineered intelligent dinosaur from the future, sent back in time just prior to the Cretaceous–Paleogene extinction event.

== Story ==
The Nanosaur encounters a Stegosaurus during the first visit to the jungle area. None of the five eggs needed, nor any additional jetpack fuel, have been collected, and 19 minutes and 28 seconds remain in the game.

In the distant year of 4122, a dinosaur species, Nanosaurs, rule the Earth. Their civilization originated from a group of human scientists who experimented with genetic engineering. Their experimentation led them to resurrect the extinct dinosaur species; however, their victory was short-lived, as a disastrous plague brought the end of their civilization itself. The few dinosaurs resurrected were lent an unusual amount of intelligence from their human creators, leaving them to expand on their growing civilization. However, as the Nanosaurs were the only species on Earth, inbreeding was the only possible choice of reproduction. This method largely affected the intelligence of the various offspring, and slowly began to pose a threat to their once-intelligent society.

The Nanosaur government offers a quest that involves time traveling into the year 65 million BC, where the five eggs of ancient dinosaur species must be retrieved and placed in a time portal leading to the present year. Their high-ranking agent, a brown Deinonychus Nanosaur, is chosen to participate in this mission. On the day of its mission, it is teleported to the past via a time machine in a Nanosaur laboratory.

The Nanosaur arrives in a lush jungle, with twenty minutes given to collect the eggs before the meteor that caused the initial extinction of the dinosaur race hits the Earth. After battling various Tyrannosauruses, the Nanosaur enters a volcanic crater, where it must cross several stone formations in a river of lava in order to retrieve the eggs. After making its way across the river, the Nanosaur detects the final eggs in a canyon oasis, where various dinosaurs, namely Dilophosaurus and Stegosaurus, are attempting to hinder its progress in order to protect their eggs. After evading defeat, the Nanosaur beams the final egg into the time portal, and is carried along with it back to the present.

Following the completion of the Nanosaur's mission, the eggs are placed in nationwide laboratories, where the scientists intend on breeding them for their own purposes. Several months following this event, the eggs finally start to hatch.

== Gameplay ==
The object of the game is to collect the eggs of five dinosaur and flying reptile species and deposit them in time portals to the future in twenty minutes; at the end of the countdown, the asteroid that caused the Cretaceous–Paleogene extinction event hits Earth. The Nanosaur is equipped with a "fusion blaster" (a basic multi-purpose energy weapon), a jet pack allowing flight, a temporal compass for locating time portals, and a GPS locator for navigation.

The native animals will attack the Nanosaur when their eggs are threatened; species encountered include Dilophosaurus (which spits venom as in the Jurassic Park film), Pteranodon, Stegosaurus, Triceratops, and Tyrannosaurus. As well as hostile creatures, the Nanosaur must also avoid environmental hazards which slow the player down or inflict damage, such as: water, lava, tumbling boulders, and spores from poisonous fungi.

== Legacy ==
The game was being ported to Linux by Three Axis Interactive, but the port was never completed. Around 2003, the source code of the game was made available by the developer under a restrictive license. In 2021 an open source version of the game utilizing OpenGL was ported to modern systems (Windows, Mac, and Linux) with the developer's blessing by Iliyas Jorio. Jorio had previously ported their other title, Bugdom, to modern systems in 2020.

Nanosaur Extreme is another version of Nanosaur, released at a later time with heftier system requirements. It has many more enemies and weapons than Nanosaur, and it is described on the Nanosaur downloads page as "what Nanosaur was meant to be – a total kill-fest".

Nanosaur 2: Hatchling, a continuation of the original Nanosaur storyline, was released in March 2004. Nanosaur 2 is the first stereoscopic game released for the Mac.
