= Bugdom =

- Developers: Macintosh; Pangea Software; Windows; Hoplite Research (2000); Ideas From the Deep (2003)
- Publishers: Macintosh; Pangea Software; Windows; On Deck Interactive (2000); Ideas From the Deep (2003)
- Programmer: Brian Greenstone
- Artist: Scott Harper
- Composer: Mike Beckett
- Platforms: Mac OS 9, Microsoft Windows
- Release: December 1, 1999: Macintosh; NA: December 1, 1999 Microsoft Windows; NA: October 27, 2000; WW: March 24, 2003 (Re-release)
- Genre: Platformer
- Mode: Single player

Bugdom is a 1999 platform video game developed and published by Pangea Software for Mac OS 9. It was included with the iMac DV 2000 and later iBook models.

Bugdom was ported to Microsoft Windows by Hoplite Research and released in 2000 by On Deck Interactive, a division of Gathering of Developers. Following the acquisition of Gathering by Take-Two Interactive in 2002, the game was ported again by Ideas From the Deep. However, Take-Two Interactive apparently continued publishing illegal copies of Bugdom, prompting Ideas From the Deep to contact the FBI's crime division. Despite this, Take-Two Interactive continued to publish copies following the debate.

Bugdom was generally well received by critics, being praised for its graphics, gameplay and soundtrack but criticized for certain technical glitches as well as gameplay repetition, and sold fairly well.

A sequel, Bugdom 2, was released on December 30, 2002.

== Gameplay ==
Bugdom is a third-person 3D platformer in which the player controls the main character Rollie McFly through ten different stages set in the Bugdom, namely a lawn, a pond, a forest which resembles a bug's interpretation of a garden, a beehive, a nighttime-themed level, and an anthill.

Rollie has the ability to jump, kick, and roll, the latter two of which can be used to attack most hostile enemies. Nuts are scattered throughout the level which, upon being opened, have power-ups, keys, clovers, buddy bugs, or enemies. Gates can only be opened when Rollie has the appropriate colored key. Ladybugs are trapped at several points of each level and can be freed by kicking their web cages. When Rollie reaches the level exit, a hollow log, the player's score is tallied based on the number of ladybugs freed, the number of clovers found, and if all four pieces of the blue clover has been found. In Level 9, if all 4 gold clovers are found, they will be tallied in that level.

== Plot ==
Bugdom's story centers on the Bugdom, a kingdom inhabited by insects that appears as an outdoors bug environment. Originally, the kingdom was peacefully ruled by rollie pollies and ladybugs, but not long ago, the kingdom was overthrown by the tyrannical and pompous King Thorax, leader of an evil clan of fire ants, as well as their evil follower bugs recruited prior to the kingdom's downfall. Thorax now rules the kingdom with an iron fist, and the ladybugs have been imprisoned in spider web cages scattered across the environment. The player assumes the role of Rollie McFly, who has survived the ambush of the kingdom by taking refuge in the lawn area. Rollie must travel to Thorax's anthill on the distant reaches of the Bugdom, while freeing various trapped ladybugs along the way.

== Reception ==
Reception

Review score
Publication	Score
Macworld	4/5

Pangea Software considers Bugdom to be their most popular Mac game. The Mac OS version of Bugdom received generally positive reviews, according to a 70% on GameRankings. Dziga Robilev of IGN rated Bugdom a 7/10, calling it "one of the best crafted platform games available for the Mac." However, Robilev also stated "The only thing holding this baby back is that the levels themselves don't offer enough variety. There is a lot of the same activity being performed over and over again. Still, the game is a fun play and younger gamers will definitely have a good time with it." MacMagazin rated the game a 6/6 Mac score, saying "We are sure: Bugdom will be the summer hit this year among the Mac games." iMacSidian rated the game a 5/5, saying "Bugdom really fills the huge gap of platform games for the Mac... The graphics are absolutely top notch - you have to see it to believe it." Mac Gamer's Ledge rated the game a 4.5 out of 5 score, calling it "a feast for the eyes and ears." AppleLinks called the game's musical score "fantastic" and called the game "one of the first games that really can be enjoyed by both children and adults." Inside Mac Games rated the game a 4/5, saying "Bugdom is certainly a great game... and it is good enough to rival many of the Nintendo 64 and PlayStation titles that it is similar to. Its easy-to-grasp controls and interface are almost totally transparent, even to new users, and the feel of the game is just plush and polished - as is the look.

== Legacy ==
A sequel to Bugdom, Bugdom 2, was released in 2002. It stars a grasshopper named Skip who attempts to retrieve his stolen knapsack from a large Bully Bee. As of March 1, 2002, it has sold over 30,000 copies worldwide, prompting Pangea to rerelease the game as a shareware release.

In December 2020, an open source version of Bugdom that uses OpenGL was released for modern systems (MacOS X, Linux, Windows) by Iliyas Jorio with the approval of PangeaSoft. In February 2021, Jorio also released a ported version of PangeaSoft's game Nanosaur.

== See also ==
- Truform, rendering technology used in Bugdom
