= William Appleton (entrepreneur) =

American entrepreneur and technologist

- Born: May 23, 1961 (age 65)
- Occupation: Software entrepreneur
- Years active: 1985–present
- Known for: CyberFlix; Titanic: Adventure Out of Time

William "Bill" Appleton (born May 23, 1961) is an American entrepreneur and technologist best known as the programmer of the first rich media authoring tool World Builder, the multimedia programming language SuperCard, a best-selling CD-ROM Titanic: Adventure Out of Time, the DreamFactory REST API platform, and Snapshot Org Management for Salesforce.

== Early life and background ==
Originally from Oak Ridge, Tennessee, Appleton graduated from Oak Ridge High School in 1979 before moving on to Davidson College, where he studied philosophy, painting and economics. In 1984 Appleton passed up an economics graduate fellowship at Vanderbilt University and moved into his parents’ basement, where he developed programs for his Macintosh computer.

== Career ==
Appleton has designed and written more than 30 professional software publications throughout his career, including World Builder, the first-ever rich media authoring tool. Appleton also created the multimedia programming language SuperCard and developed Titanic: Adventure Out of Time, a national best-selling CD-ROM game that sold more than 5 million copies worldwide. He was the founder and Chief Technology Officer of DreamFactory and developed a serverless REST API platform in the enterprise space. Currently he is the Chief Technology Officer at Metazoa working on Snapshot Org Management for Salesforce.

In 1989, Appleton won the Silicon Beach Software Technical Innovation Award, presented for his work in hypermedia development environments. Appleton owns two patents. The first, issued in 1997, covers a method for the production of digital movies. The second, issued in 1998, describes a computer display system for the real-time display of digital movie frames.

Appleton's software applications include the following:

Silicon Beach Software

- 1985, Enchanted Scepters
- 1986, World Builder
- 1988, Apache Strike
- 1989, SuperCard

TeleRobotics Inc.

- 1986, Course Builder
- 1987, Video Builder

Symmetry Corp

- 1988, HyperDA

Reactor

- 1991, Creepy Castle

Cyberflix

- 1993, Lunicus
- 1994, Jump Raven
- 1995, Dust: A Tale of the Wired West
- 1996, Skull Cracker
- 1996, Titanic: Adventure Out of Time
- 1996, Timelapse
- 1997, Power Rangers Zeo vs. The Machine Empire
- 1998, Redjack: Revenge of the Brethren

Disney Interactive

- 1997, MathQuest
- 1998, The D Show
- 1998, ReadingQuest
- 1999, Villains’ Revenge

MessageBay

- 2000, VoiceAnimation
- 2001, VideoAnimator

DreamFactory

- 2002, DreamFactory Player
- 2003, SBuilder
- 2005, DreamTeam
- 2006, OrgView
- 2006, SnapShot
- 2006, Carousel
- 2006, FormFactory
- 2006, Web Meeting Mashup
- 2008, TableTop
- 2008, Monarch
- 2009, GamePlan
- 2010, Retail Relay
- 2011, LaunchPad
- 2013, DreamFactory API Platform

=== CyberFlix ===
After stints in Silicon Valley and Chicago, Appleton moved back home to Knoxville, Tennessee. From 1994 to 1998, Appleton served as founder and president of Cyberflix Inc., a Knoxville-based multimedia computer programming company specializing in interactive movie production. While at Cyberflix, Appleton worked on the hit titles Lunicus and Jump Raven, both of which were sold to Paramount Technology Group. In a 1993 interview with the Chicago Tribune, Appleton discussed what he saw as the future of video game characters. "Great dramatic issues will be played out on CD-ROM, things that will play all of the human emotions, love hate, joy, greed, childbirth, death, promotion, firing – you name it," he was quoted as saying.

Cyberflix launched its hit title Titanic: Adventure Out of Time in November 1996. Production costs totaled $2 million, and the game retailed for $50. The Titanic title went on to sell millions of copies and become an international best-selling CD-ROM game. The game features an interactive, authentic replica of the Titanic ship that took two years of research to create digitally and included the use of the ship's original blueprints. At the time, the Discovery Channel called it "the most historically accurate digital model of Titanic available." Titanic: Adventure Out of Time earned a MacHome Journal Home Choice Award in 1997, as well as a first place prize for best animation at the World Animation Celebration. By 1998, Cyberflix had 35 employees, and annual revenue exceeded $3 million. Throughout his career, Appleton has worked with Disney, Paramount and Viacom to create applications for content development.

=== DreamFactory ===
Appleton served as the chief technology officer of DreamFactory, a Campbell, California-based company he co-founded. DreamFactory builds software tools for the enterprise, originally targeting Salesforce.com users and currently developing a cloud service platform for enterprise companies to move their apps and data freely without any lock-in restrictions to any hosted cloud. Appleton is also credited with developing third-party enterprise applications for Cisco WebEx Connect, Microsoft Azure and Intuit WorkPlace.

== Personal life ==
Appleton lives in Los Gatos, California.
