= Redjack: Revenge of the Brethren =

1998 video game

- Developer: Cyberflix
- Publisher: THQ
- Producer: Bob Clouse
- Programmer: Steve Britton
- Artists: Eric Whited; Steven McBride
- Writers: Molly Johnson; Bill Appleton
- Composer: Scott Scheinbaum
- Platforms: Windows, Mac OS
- Release: EU: 1998; NA: September 22, 1998
- Genre: Action-adventure
- Mode: Single-player

Redjack: Revenge of the Brethren is an action-adventure video game developed by Cyberflix and released by THQ for Windows and Mac OS in 1998.

== Gameplay ==
Redjack uses several different engines: the main engine is a rotatory 3D engine, which is used for exploration. When the character enters a fight, the game loads a new screen. There are also different screens for different scenarios, such as concocting volatile drinks, shooting from a cannon on a speeding cart, and puzzles.

== Plot ==
The player assumes the role of a young blond-haired man named Nicholas Dove who inhabits Lizard Point. He is pressured by people that are close to him to make something of himself. Nicholas decides to join a pirate crew in order to make a living. He meets a pirate named Lyle who, after saving him from assassins, tells him that Captain Justice is hiring men because he lost some in an "accident". Captain Justice only hires those that are generally brave enough to form his crew and dares Nicholas to kill a shark. After killing the shark (with poison) and finding a sword and learning to fight from Lyle, Nicholas joins the crew.

After taking the pirate's oath, Nicholas roams the ship and meets Sullivan, who is revealed to be a woman named Anne disguised as a man. When the ship docks at Port Royal, Nicholas is given a watch by Captain Justice. He visits Erzulie who tells him of his future. Nicholas witnesses Captain Justice being murdered by assassins and is blamed for it as he has the captain's watch. After escaping from prison he is captured by Bone and saved later on by Lyle, who maroons him with Sullivan, who was found out.

Nicholas washes ashore onto Redjack Island where he discovers Redjack's corpse. He lights a fire signal and is found by a balloon ship. He is escorted to Blackbeard's fortress and requests an audience. Blackbeard tells Nicholas some of the mythology of the brethren but is knocked unconscious by Bone and his men. Nicholas kills Bone and set sail for Cartagena.

Nicholas enters the city through a secret sewer entrance. He frees his captive friends, Elizabeth and his brother. He enters the Viceroy's room and get captured by a man named Marquez, who is revealed to have betrayed Redjack. After breaking up the reunion of the brethren, Nicholas kills Marquez and rescues Anne before sinking the Spanish fleet and rescuing Blackbeard. The game ends with Nicholas finding treasure at the wreckage of Redjack's ship.

== Development ==
According to Jack Neely of Metro Pulse, developer CyberFlix had Redjack "on the drawing board for years" in various forms as it developed other games, such as Titanic: Adventure Out of Time. PC Gamer US reported in early 1995 that the game, then called RedJack's Revenge, was being created concurrently with Titanic and was "in the early stages" of development. Despite the other pirate-themed games of the period, a writer for the magazine noted that "Cyberflix feels the outlaw spirit and mysterious lives of these roguish individuals just hasn't been given the full attention they deserve." The game was set for release in the fall of 1995. Ultimately, it did not launch until September 22, 1998.

In February 1996, the magazine reported that Red Jack's Revenge had been pushed back to a late-1996 launch alongside Titanic, and was set to be a musical. This version of the game had a lighthearted tone, with songs written by CyberFlix composer Scott Scheinbaum, among others. CyberFlix ultimately reworked the project after its musical version was "laughed out of a focus group", according to artist Jay Nevins. As a result, the team opted instead for a more serious theme, a redesign that delayed Redjack past its earlier ship date.

== Reception ==
Reception

Aggregate score
Aggregator	Score
GameRankings	69%

Review scores
Publication	Score
Adventure Gamers	2/5
AllGame	4/5
Computer Games Strategy Plus	3/5
Computer Gaming World	2/5
EP Daily	7/10
GameRevolution	B
GameSpot	6/10
Hyper	57%
MacLife	"Spiffy"
Macworld	4/5
Next Generation	3/5
PC Gamer (US)	58%
PC Zone	75%
MacHome	3.5/5

The game received average reviews according to the review aggregation website GameRankings. Next Generation wrote, "While not as accessible as Titanic, Redjack may just transform steadfast adventure gamers over to the action genre." Macworld's Michael Gowan wrote that Redjack "features a good story line, slightly rough language, and arcadelike swordplay that's a bit too hard to master." He summarized it as an "enjoyable pirate adventure".

Jack Neely of Metro Pulse wrote in October 1999, "RedJack didn't sell nearly as well as hoped; its total sales may have been as little as 10,000 nationwide, hardly 1 percent of Titanic's success."

The Electric Playground nominated the game for their 1998 "Best Adventure Game" award, which ultimately went to Grim Fandango. Shoeless Lyle earned a runner-up position for the publication's "Best New Game Character" prize as well, but lost to Aya Brea of Parasite Eve.
