= Jump Raven =

1994 video game

- Cover art by Mark Maxwell
- Developer: Cyberflix
- Publisher: Paramount Interactive
- Programmer: Bill Appleton
- Artists: Jamie Wicks; Debbie Hughes
- Writer: Andrew Nelson
- Platforms: Windows, Mac OS
- Release: 1994
- Genre: Shooter
- Mode: Single-player

Jump Raven was the second game released by Cyberflix, in 1994. The game's technology is similar to that of Lunicus, released by Cyberflix one year prior, but this time employs a more detailed storyline and environment. In an opening sequence of the game, we see future New York City, which has fallen into horrible disrepair in the aftermath of global warming and rising sea levels and a bankrupt federal government. The premise of the story is that gangsters, neo-nazis, and various other thugs have acquired large stores of weapons from the government, and have ransacked New York's store of cryogenically-frozen DNA of endangered species. The player's job as a bounty hunter is to retrieve them.

== Gameplay ==
Before taking off in a fancy hovercraft, the player chooses a co-pilot who can navigate or fire weapons. selecting Nikki, Chablis, "Cheesestick" Limbaugh (supposedly descended from Rush, though he is black), Thrash, Lark or Dogstar. Each co-pilot is unique and may not be available for every level.

The game's three difficult and lengthy levels are played in the player's hovercraft flying around the streets of New York. The opponents drive tanks or fly planes and insult the player frequently. The user can choose between one of several bands for theme music, each of which has a unique song per level. The bands include: X-Static, Deathkiller, Pink Flannel, and Smoove Da Groove. The name "Deathkiller" was coined at a trade show - two Japanese girls watched the demo and described it as "deathkiller".

Game control is rather complicated as the player can move up, down, left, right, and forward and backward. The player must also control weapons. Fortunately, the copilot can take care of one or more of these functions.

== Development ==
Following the successful launch of its CD-ROM game Lunicus in April 1993, developer CyberFlix began to create Jump Raven with the DreamFactory development environment from the first title. At the time, CD-ROM games tended to run slowly, but DreamFactory was designed to allow an unusually high level of speed for the era. However, CyberFlix considered its projects to be "interactive movies" rather than games, according to Jack Neely of Metro Pulse, and DreamFactory placed an emphasis on storytelling. As with Lunicus, production of Jump Raven began in the basement of a log cabin owned by CyberFlix founder William Appleton. The game's development team was composed of four members: Appleton, creator of DreamFactory, who handled the game's programming; audio lead Scott Scheinbaum; artist Jamie Wicks; and screenwriter Andrew Nelson. The four had originally founded CyberFlix to create Lunicus, and the company was incorporated a month after its release, with the help of manager Erik Quist. Science Fiction and Fantasy Illustrator: Debbie Hughes was hired as a freelancer to create the "puppet characters" for the game. Hughes Illustrated over 14 characters that players interacted with in the game.

CyberFlix demonstrated Jump Raven at the Macworld Expo later in 1993, to public acclaim, and impressed Paramount Interactive employees who were in attendance. As a result, CyberFlix received a "multi-million-dollar deal for it" from Paramount, Neely later wrote. The agreement, which the two companies closed by November 1993, contracted CyberFlix for three games.

== Reception ==
Reception

Review scores
Publication	Score
Hyper	79%
PC Gamer (US)	76%
MacUser	4/5
CD-ROM Today	3/5
Electronic Entertainment	9/10

Jump Raven's initial Macintosh release was a commercial success. Discussing the multimedia development scene in 1994, a writer for The New York Times called the game one of "the best-selling and most critically praised [multimedia] titles on the market", alongside Myst. Market research firm PC Data named it the fourth-best-selling Macintosh game of July 1994, and the platform's seventh-highest seller in September. By August, Jump Raven had reached sales of 50,000 units. Around the 28th of that month, another 50,000 units were shipped for Microsoft Windows. Erik Quist of CyberFlix expected the game to sell 100,000 units overall "by Christmas", Barbara Kantrowitz of Newsweek reported at the time. Sales of Jump Raven had reached close to the 100,000 mark by January 3.

Christopher Breen of Computer Gaming World enjoyed Jump Raven's combat and "often very amusing" writing, and noted that "the game is darned fast for a CD-ROM". However, he criticized the "incredibly annoying" copilot voices and "inane dialogue", and considered its interface clumsy. He concluded, "Adequately addressing these issues might have made Jump Raven a great strategy/action adventure rather than just a good arcade game." The game was reviewed in June 1995 in Dragon #218 by Paul Murphy in the "Eye of the Monitor" column. Murphy's review was negative, concluding "I don't care how good a game looks or sounds, how cool the animation and special-effects are, how easy it is to load or save: if it isn't any fun to play, it's a failure." CNET called the writing and humor in Jump Raven excellent.
