= Dream Factory =

Dream Factory or DreamFactory or The Dream Factory may refer to:

== Film and theatre ==
- The Dream Factory (film), a 1997 Chinese film directed by Feng Xiaogang
- Dream Factory (2019 film), the English title of Traumfabrik, a 2019 German film directed by Martin Schreier
- The Dream Factory, a Playbox Theatre Company theatre in Warwick, England
- Dream Factory (distributor), an Indian film distribution company
- Mithun's Dream Factory, an Indian film studio
- Kanavu Variyam, a 2017 Indian Tamil-language drama film

== Literature ==
- Dream Factory (short story), a 2022 short story by Greg Egan

== Technology companies ==
- DreamFactory, an American software company
- DreamFactory (game company), a video game developer

== Music ==
- Dream Factory (album), a 1986 unreleased double LP by Prince and The Revolution
- Dream Factory, a 2009 album by Neno Belan

== See also ==
Traumfabrik, German for "Dream Factory"

- Traumfabrik, a 2025 album by Vanessa Mai
- Traumfabrik (Showtheater), a German show theatre
- Traumfabrik (film), a German film by Martin Schreier (2019)
