= Skull Cracker =

1996 video game

- Developer: CyberFlix
- Publisher: GTE Entertainment
- Director: Rand Cabus
- Producer: Robb Dean
- Designer: Robb Dean
- Programmers: Don McCasland; Bill Appleton
- Artists: Eric Whited; Anthony S. Taylor
- Writer: Mark Cabus
- Composer: Scott Scheinbaum
- Platforms: Windows, Mac OS
- Release: 1996
- Genre: Beat 'em up
- Mode: Single-player

Skull Cracker is a 1996 supernatural beat 'em up video game developed by American studio CyberFlix and published by GTE Entertainment on Macintosh and Windows. It is sometimes considered a spiritual successor to the 1991 title Creepy Castle, which the game's head of technology William Appleton had previously written for Reactor Inc. Skull Cracker was conceptually designed by Ben Calica.

== Development ==
After the release of Titanic: Adventure Out of Time, Cyberflix released this old project which had been sitting in the vaults for a few years. The game was demoed on October 28, 1995 at the Double Tree Hotel (Crowne Plaza) in Rockville. It also previewed at the 1994 Summer Consumer Electronics Show along with other Cyberflix games, presented by Paramount.

== Plot and gameplay ==
The developers described it as an "old-fashioned side-scrolling arcade game". The game sees the player battle through 16 levels of the undead and monsters. The game contains 50s-style monsters and 90s-style urban grit.

== Reception ==
GameSpot offered a scathing review, panning the title's "bad art, poor animation, limited controls, no decent action, lame gameplay". MacLedge felt the game was a letdown from Cyberflix's previous work. Inside Mac Games praised the title's intriguing storyline, witty humor and exciting gameplay. Cyberflix head Scott Scheinbaum would later say "Every company makes mistakes, and that was ours...It should have come out a year and a half before it did", noting that 1994 technology seemed stale by 1996. World Village noted the game was a departure from the history-based title Titanic.
