= Debbie Hughes =

American artist

- Hughes
- Born: May 14, 1958; Lexington, Kentucky
- Occupations: Artist and illustrator
- Known for: Science fiction and fantasy illustrations

Debbie Hughes (born May 14, 1958 in Lexington, Kentucky) is an American artist specializing in science fiction and fantasy illustration. Her work has appeared in over 150 publications.

== Early career ==
Hughes is the granddaughter of Hildegarde Hamilton, an impressionist painter, well known in the U.S. and Europe. Hughes received her BA from Furman University. Her first published cover was for Science Fiction Chronicle. Her next book covers appeared on Baen Books in 1989 which included covers for Roger Zelazny, Aline Boucher Kaplan and Don Wismer. This was followed by frontispiece work for Easton Press/MBI books which included illustration for such authors as Alexei Panshin, Sir Kingsley Amis, Charles Pellegrino, Mike Resnick, Allen Steele, Gentry Lee, Sheri S. Tepper, Spider Robinson, and Jack McDevitt.

Hughes did interior color illustrations for Amazing Stories Magazine, Science Fiction Age Magazine and Realms of Fantasy Magazine. She created interior illustrations for Ben Bova, Martha Soukup, A.J. Austin, Vivian Vande Velde, Deborah Wheeler, Gary W. Herring, and Joyce K. Jensen. In her work for a CD Rom Company: The Bookworm, Hughes illustrated the entire book Little Women with over 45 illustrations. She illustrated the works of Edgar Allan Poe with 12 illustrations, Nathaniel Hawthorne's The Scarlet Letter with seven illustrations and Mary Shelley's Frankenstein with 10 illustrations. From 1992 to 1994, Hughes did illustration work for Cyberflix, a local game company in Knoxville, TN. Cyberflix also signed on with Paramount Interactive and as a result Debbie worked for both companies. She worked on the CD Rom titles: Title JumpRaven, Viper and Dust. She went on to work for The Bookworm and The Learning Company. At the Learning Company she illustrated for numerous Language learning CD titles and she also worked on the Title: Reader Rabbit.

== Games, cards and software ==
Hughes' work has been seen in the CD Rom games JumpRaven and Dust. The Bookworm's Illustrated Classic Series, The Learning Company's Learn to Speak Series, and Reader Rabbit feature her artwork. She also created animation work for Dust, Reader Rabbit and the Bookworm's Illustrated Classic Series.

Her collectible game card work includes illustrations for Wizards of the Coast, Thunder Castle Games, DragonStorm Games, Gatekeeper Press, Mayfair Games, Companion Games, Last Unicorn Games, Five Rings Publishing, Precedence Entertainment, and Iron Crown Enterprises.

== Recent work ==
Hughes' work "Dark Streets" is featured in Neither Beginnings nor Endings, The JordanCon 2022 Anthology.

Hughes' work was featured in the 2020 December issue of Utopia Magazine where she was interviewed by the Editor Tristan Evarts. This is a very in depth interview with many of Debbie's published and unpublished works.

Hughes' work was featured in the 2019 Yandex - Museum of the Future (Russian Magazine)

Hughes' recent work includes 2011 ASFA Journal cover, the frontispiece illustration for Spider Robinson's newest novel, Very Hard Choices, published by Easton Press; the frontispiece illustration for Sheri S. Tepper's novel The Margarets, published by Easton Press, a full color wrap around illustration for Nancy Farmer's Sea of Trolls, published by Editorial Presenca, Portugal and a full color wrap around cover illustration for the Postscripts Cover, Spring issue 6, 2006, P & S Publishing, UK.

The book Ruins Metropolis by Eric T. Reynolds (editor) is the third volume in the Ruins series from Hadley Rille Books. It is a collection of 35 fantasy and science fiction stories based on Hughes' art work.

Hughes has been the artist guest of honor at many conventions in the North and Southeast United States. She is listed in the 2009 edition of Science Fiction and Fantasy Artists of the Twentieth Century written by Jane Frank. Her work has been exhibited in galleries across the United States.

== Honors ==
Hughes was invited to show over 50 pieces of her original paintings at the Lexington Public Library, Lexington KY from March 17 - May 16, 2023. The Show was titled Fantastic Worlds & Visions of the Future. The Downtown Lexington Library exhibits occur 6 times a year. Debbie was invited to show her works because she is a native of Lexington, KY, born there in 1958. This exhibit was a retrospective of her published works in Science Fiction and Fantasy art since 1989 to the present and included current works.

Hughes received The Bernadette Award for her work: "Impedance in Slumber" from The National Association of Women Artists 132nd Annual Exhibition. This was held at One Art Space, 23 Warren Street (Tribeca)NY. NY. Oct. 16-23 2021. Debbie' work, "Seasons of Wither won an Honorable Mention with The National Association of Women Artists exhibit: "Grand Visions, we are here", September 2020. This was held at the Grand Central Library, NYPL, 135 East 46th Street, New York, NY 10017.

Hughes received the Chesley Award from the Association of Science Fiction & Fantasy Artists (ASFA) October 2020. Category: Unpublished Color Art work for her painting: "The Raven, the Wolf and the Maiden".

On November 14, 2019, she was inducted into the National Association of Women Artists which is the oldest women's fine art organization in the country. Debbie joins a list of distinguished American women artists.

== Published works ==
Utopia Magazine Volume VII • March, 2026. Interior Illustration, “Alien Landscape” © Debbie Hughes.

The Ninth Rule of Rebirth, by Eric Carl Wolf, full color front and back book cover by Debbie Hughes. 2026.

The Peregrino Prison Blues, by Eric Carl Wolf, full color book cover by Debbie Hughes. 2025.

Neither Beginnings Nor Endings, The JordanCon 2022 Anthology Edited by Richard Fife. A yearly anthology for JordanCon. Interior Illustration.

Utopia Magazine, 2020 December issue. Featured Art and interview.

Acta Astronautic, 2012, Dyson Dots: Changing the Solar Constant to a Variable with Photovoltaic Lightsails by Robert Kennedy. Illustrations by Debbie Hughes

The SFWA Bulletin Winter 2012 Full color cover by Debbie Hughes.

Science Fiction and Fantasy Artists of the Twentieth Century: A Biographical Dictionary, by Jane Frank, 2009.

This books includes Debbie's biography and a list of all published works up until that date.

Like Mayflies in a Stream Hadley Rille Books, Full Color Cover by Debbie Hughes, Story by Shauna Roberts. August 2009.

Very Hard Choices, Easton Press 2008, Color Frontispiece. Limited Leatherbound Edition. Story by Spider Robinson

Ruins Metropolis, Hadley Rille Books, Thirty-five fantasy and science fiction stories based on Debbie Hughes's cover art, "The Spirits of Hathor." 2008.

The Margarets, Easton Press 2007. Color Frontispiece by Debbie Hughes Novel by Sheri Tepper.

O Mars dos Trolls, Editorial Presenca, Portugal. Full Color Wrap around cover by Debbie Hughes, Novel by Nancy Farmer, 2006.

Postscripts, Spring Issue 6, 2006, UK. Full Color Wrap around Cover by Debbie Hughes

Coyote Rising, Easton Press, 2005, Color Frontispiece by Debbie Hughes. Novel by Allen Steele.

Tranquility Wars, Easton Press, Color Frontispiece by Debbie Hughes, Novel by Gentry Lee.

Infinity Beach, Easton Press. 2000, Color Fronispiece by Debbie Hughes Novel by Jack McDevitt.

The Death of Jabari, Full color cover by Debbie Hughes, Novel by Kim Bundy. ISBN 0-595-16024-7.

Would That it Were, July – September issue, 2000 – online. Color Cover by Debbie Hughes, Edited by Don Munchow

Dust, Easton Press, Color Frontispiece by Debbie Hughes, Novel by Charles Pelligrino.

New Millennium Writings, Winter 1997–1998. Black and white interior illustrationby Debbie Hughes for Phyllis D. Kasler short story: Horse Opera.

Mimosa Issue 19. Wrap around cover by Debbie Hughes. Edited by Nicki and Rich Lynch.

Mother Movies In, Realms of Fantasy Magazine, July issue 1995. Full Color Interior Illustration by Debbie Hughes, Short Story by Deborah Wheeler.

"Tiny Demons" Bookworm Student Library, Collection of Poetry. 1995

Kubla Khan, by Samuel Taylor Coleridge. Bookworm Student Library. Collection of Poetry.1995

The Scarlet Letter. Bookworm Student Library. 1995. 10 illustrations

Frankenstein Bookworms Student Library 1995. 10 Illustrations

Collected works of Edgar Alan Poe. Bookworm Student Library. 1995. 10 Illustrations.

Little Women. Bookworm Student Library. 1995. 25 illustrations.

Newsweek August 1994. Article: Garage-Band Programmers. Page 50–51. Artwork I created for JumpRaven appeared in this issue.

Purgatory, Easton Press, 1993. Color frontispiece by Debbie Hughes. Novel by Mike Resnick.

A Defense of a Social Contract, Science Fiction Age Magazine, July 1993. Interior Color Illustration by Debbie Hughes. Short Story by Martha Soukup.

The Alteration, Easton Press 1993. Color Frontispiece by Debbie Hughes. Novel by Sir Kingsley Amis.

Merging Forever with the Dolowei, Amazing Stories Magazine. January 1993. Interior Color illustration by Debbie Hughes. Short Story by Joyce K. Jenson.

Thy Kingdom Come, Science Fiction Age Magazine, May 1993. Interior Center Spread color by Debbie Hughes. Short Story by Ben Bova.

Fireballing, Amazing Stories Magazine, issue 4, 1991. Interior Color illustration by Debbie Hughes

Sunday Driver, Yeah, Amazing Stories Magazine, Issue 1, 1991. Full color Interior Illustration by Debbie Hughes. Short Story by A.J. Austin.

Time Enough, Amazing Stories Magazine, Issue 6, 1991. Full Color Interior Illustration by Debbie Hughes. Short Story by Vivian Vande Veldi.

Rite of Passage, Easton Press, 1991. Color frontispiece by Debbie Hughes. Novel by Alexei Panshin.

A Roil of Stars, Baen Books, 1990. Color Cover by Debbie Hughes. Novel by Don Wismer.

Four for Tomorrow, Baen Books, 1990. Wrap around color cover by Debbie Hughes. Short story collection by Roger Zelazny.

World Spirits, Baen Books, 1990. Color Cover by Debbie Hughes. Novel by Aline Boucher Kaplan.

When the Black Lotus Blooms, Unnamable Press, 1990. Interior black and white illustration by Debbie Hughes short story: Waygift by Gerald W. Page

Science Fiction Chronicle. 1989. Color Cover by Debbie Hughes

Published work on Collectible Game Cards:

Dune: Eye of the StormTM. Published by Last Unicorn Games and Five Rings Publishing Group. 1998. Color Illustrations by Debbie Hughes

Lidless Eye, Lord of the Rings Expansion, Iron Crown Enterprises 1997. Color Illustrations by Debbie Hughes

Kanchaka Valley, DragonStorm Expansion, 1997. Color Illustrations by Debbie Hughes

Silent Impact, Wizards of the Coast. Expansion 2 for NetRunner, 1997. Color Illustrations by Debbie Hughes

Proteus, Wizards of the Coast. Expansion 3 for NetRunner, 1997. Color Illustrations by Debbie Hughes

Towers in Time - The Greek Edition, Thunder Castle Games, 1997. Color Illustrations by Debbie Hughes

Fantasy Adventures, Mayfair Games, 1996. Color Illustration by Debbie Hughes

Galactic Empires, The Universe Edition, Companion Games, 1996. Color Illustrations by Debbie Hughes

DragonStorm, GateKeeper Press, edition 1, April 1996. Color Illustrations by Debbie Hughes

Dragons, Lord of the Rings Expansion, Iron Crown Enterprises. 1996. Color Illustrations by Debbie Hughes

Gridiron, Precedence Games, 1995. Color Illustrations by Debbie Hughes

Published work on CD Rom:

Passport to 39 Languages published by The Learning Company, 1999. Hand-drawn Black and White Illustrations by Debbie Hughes

Learn to Speak German, The Learning Company, 1999. Hand-drawn Black and White Illustrations by Debbie Hughes

Reader Rabbit, The Learning Company, 1998. Color Illustration by Debbie Hughes

Learn to Speak French, The Learning Company, 1998. Hand-drawn Black and White Illustrations by Debbie Hughes

Frankenstein, The Complete works of Edgar Allan Poe, Little Women, Making the Modern and Atfter the Fire, The Scarlet Letter,

published by The Bookworm Student Library. 1995. Combination of Black and white Illustrations and full color illustrations by Debbie Hughes.

Learn to Speak Spanish, published by Hyperglot/The Learning Company. 1994. Illustration and Concept work by Debbie Hughes

JumpRaven, Viper and Dust C.D. Rom Games, published by Cyberflix and Paramount Interactive. Debbie Hughes created hand drawn

color illustrations and created animations. 1992–1994.
