= GTE Interactive Media =

American entertainment software company

- Formerly: GTE ImagiTrek; GTE Entertainment
- Type: Subsidiary
- Industry: Video games; Interactive television
- Founded: 1990
- Defunct: March 14, 1997
- Fate: Dissolved
- Headquarters: Carlsbad, California, United States
- Number of locations: 1 (1997)
- Owner: GTE Corporation
- Number of employees: 120 high in 1996, 85 end (1997)
- Parent: GTE Vantage
- Website: www.im.gte.com

GTE Interactive Media was a video game development company located in Carlsbad, California. Its focus was on the development of videos, of interactive television platforms, and of interactive video game products for arcade machines, home console cartridges, and CD-ROMs, including development and publishing under the GTE Entertainment brand. It folded in 1997.

== History ==
GTE Interactive was founded as GTE ImagiTrek in 1990 by Richard E. Robinson, as a division of GTE Vantage, a wholly owned subsidiary of the now-defunct telecommunications provider GTE. Originally named GTE ImagiTrek, it was renamed GTE Interactive Media in 1994. Richard Scott, vice president of New Ventures at GTE said "At its inception, GTE Interactive Media was viewed as a complementary adjunct to GTE's plans to develop broadband video services networks."

In January 1995, the division entered a partnership with Nintendo for the development of arcade games and of online networking. In the same month, the partnership previewed its first title, FX Fighter, at Consumer Electronics Show in Las Vegas.

In 1995, the division employed a high of 120 employees. Experiencing difficulties in the video game market and with the Telecommunications Act of 1996 putting a pinch on GTE due to deregulation, the division began to steadily lay off staff. The parent company GTE planned to cease its own content creation in favor of feeding its networks with the rapidly expanding market of third party content.

Failing to find a buyer or partner, the division announced in January 1997 that it would lay off 85 employees and cease operations on March 14, 1997. The remaining "skeleton staff" would provide technical support and further shutdown services through June 30. Citing hardships in the entire CD-ROM market, Dick Nordman, finance director for GTE's New Ventures group in Irving, Texas, explained, "In the beginning, the idea was that we wanted to get into the content business. Now, with everything else going on in the telecommunications industry, we felt our energies would be better spent in the telco arena."

== List of games ==
This is a list of video games designed in whole or in part by GTE Interactive Media.

Title	Platform	Developer	Release date
Time Traveler Hologram	Arcade	GTE Interactive Media (for Sega)	1991
M.C. Hammer's Soulfire	Genesis	Unknown	Unreleased
StreetSports Jammit	MS-DOS; 3DO, SNES; Genesis	GTE Interactive Media	1994
Vitsie Visits Dinosaurs	PC; Classic Mac OS	GTE Interactive Media (under the Interactive Toys brand)	1994
Vitsie Visits Space	PC; Classic Mac OS	GTE Interactive Media (under the Interactive Toys brand)	1994
Vitsie Visits the Ocean	PC; Classic Mac OS	GTE Interactive Media (under the Interactive Toys brand)	1994
FX Fighter	MS-DOS	Argonaut Games	1995
Rolling Stones Voodoo Lounge	MS-DOS	Second Vision	1995
Forrest Gump: Artists, Music, and Times	MS-DOS	GTE Interactive Media	1995
NCAA Championship Basketball	MS-DOS	GTE Interactive Media	1995
Street Hockey '95	SNES	GTE Interactive Media	1995
Night Light	MS-DOS; Mac	GTE Interactive Media (under the Interactive Toys brand)	1995
Tank Girl	MS-DOS	Argonaut Games	Unreleased
Dust: A Tale of the Wired West	MS-DOS	Cyberflix	1995
Sea Legends	MS-DOS	Ocean Software	May 31, 1996
Skull Cracker	MS-DOS	Cyberflix	September 30, 1996
Timelapse	MS-DOS; Mac	GTE Interactive Media	October 16, 1996
Titanic: Adventure Out of Time	MS-DOS	Cyberflix	November 12, 1996
FX Fighter Turbo	MS-DOS	Argonaut Games	1996
