= Street Hockey '95 =

1994 video game

- Cover art
- Developer(s): GTE Entertainment
- Publisher(s): GTE Entertainment
- Composer(s): Dwight Stone; Dominique Wildiez
- Platform(s): Super NES
- Release: NA: November 1994
- Genre(s): Alternative sports (Street hockey)
- Mode(s): Single-player, multiplayer

Street Hockey '95 is a roller hockey video game for the Super NES released in 1994 to an exclusively North American market.

This video game takes place in an urban environment. Instead of ice, the players play on cement and instead of ice skates, they use rollerblades. Players assemble their squads from nine hockey players who are savvy in the ways of the street. There are six different kinds of urban arenas and five different variations on the "traditional" road hockey game.

Street Hockey '95 uses more than two thousand frames of digitized animation, making it relatively advanced for its era.

== Reception ==
GamePro praised the game's variety of options and trash talking voices, but criticized the music and the controls, elaborating that "Jerky player movements and slow reactions to the button presses can be frustrating and might cause you to spend too much time on defense." They nonetheless concluded the game to be "a decent walk on hockey's wild side."

== See also ==
- Jammit (another GTE-produced game from their "StreetSports" series utilizing a similar game engine)
