= List of Days of Thunder video games =

The list of Days of Thunder video games has several licensed video games based on the film series, which started with Days of Thunder (1990).

== Days of Thunder (1990) ==
Days of Thunder was released in 1990 for PC, the NES, and the Game Boy. It was developed by Beam Software, Creative Materials, Ltd., Tiertex Design Solutions, and Argonaut Software and was published by Mindscape Group.

== Days of Thunder (2011) ==
Days of Thunder was released in 2011 for PlayStation 3 and Xbox 360. It was developed by Piranha Games, and published by Paramount Digital Entertainment and 505 Games.

== Cancelled games ==
In 1990 a second game was developed for the NES by Chris Oberth but never released. After Oberth's passing in 2012, the Video Game History Foundation extracted and compiled the source code for the game, turning it into a playable product.
