= Red Jack =

Red Jack, redjack, or variation, may refer to:

== People ==
- Jack the Ripper, of the Whitechapel murders, 19th century serial killer also nicknamed "Red Jack"
- Jack Beattie (ice hockey) (1906-1981; aka Red Jack Beattie) UK ice hockey player
- Red Jack Ellsmore (1859-1931), a captain of the Kulshan (steamship)
- Jack Keating (1916-1951; aka Red Jack Keating) Canadian ice hockey player
- Red Jack Heavenridge, U.S. basketball player, member of the 1930s ICC AllStars
- Red Jack Lamberton, American football player, member of the 1915 College Football All-America Team
- John McMartin (Canadian politician) (1858-1918; aka Red Jack McMartin)
- Red Jack Murray (1884-1958) U.S. baseball player
- Red Jack Teehan (hurler), great-grandfather of Brian Carroll (hurler)

=== Fictional characters ===
- Redjac, a Star Trek character from the episode "Wolf in the Fold", named after Jack the Ripper
- Redjack, a fictional character from the 1998 videogame Redjack: Revenge of the Brethren
- Redjack, a fictional character from the 1996 TV cartoon Project G.e.e.K.e.R.
- Redjack, a fictional character from the comic book Bucky O'Hare; see List of Bucky O'Hare characters
- Red Jack Stillwell, a fictional character from the telefilm The Tracker (1988 film)
- Red Jack Taylor Jr., a fictional character from the 2003 film My Boss's Daughter
- Red Jack (DC Comics), a comic book supervillain, named after Jack the Ripper
- Red Jack (Japanese: レッドジャック), a fictional character from the 1991 anime cartoon Armored Police Metal Jack

== Flags ==
- A Red Ensign flag of the British Empire
- A red jack version of the Flag of France
- A red jack version of the French ensign

== Other uses ==
- Red jack (Caranx ruber), a fish found on the U.S. Atlantic seaboard
- A jack (playing card) from a red suit in cards, the jack of hearts and jack of diamonds
- Redjack: Revenge of the Brethren, a 1998 videogame
  - Redjack Island, a fictional location from the videogame Redjack: Revenge of the Brethren
- Battlebook: Redjack (comic book), a 2018 comic by Geoffrey Thorne
- "Red Jack", a 1951 episode of the TV Western The Range Rider
- Red Jack Gang (1880s), an Old West gang, see List of Old West gangs

== See also ==
- Jack red, the red colour of the Union Jack and the Red Ensign
- Jack the Ripper (disambiguation)
- Jack of Diamonds (disambiguation)
- Jack of Hearts (disambiguation)
- Black Jack (disambiguation)
- Jack (disambiguation)
- Red (disambiguation)
