= Dust: A Tale of the Wired West =

1995 video game

- Developer: CyberFlix
- Publisher: GTE Entertainment
- Producer: Andrew Nelson
- Programmer: Bill Appleton
- Artists: Jamie Wicks; Michael Gilmore
- Writer: Andrew Nelson
- Composer: Scott Scheinbaum
- Engine: DreamFactory
- Platforms: Windows, Classic Mac OS
- Release: 1995
- Genre: Adventure
- Mode: Single-player

Dust: A Tale of the Wired West is a video game made for Windows and Classic Mac OS. It was developed by CyberFlix and published by GTE Entertainment on June 30, 1995.

The game is a point-and-click adventure in which the player takes on the role of The Stranger and travels around a virtual old west desert town in the New Mexico desert in 1882. There are several minigames, including blackjack and poker, where the player can choose to play honestly or cheat, and a shooting range which helps prepare the player for a later segment of the game.

The characters encountered in Dust are rendered by way of photographs of professional actors given limited animation in sync with dialogue. A later game produced by the same company, Titanic: Adventure Out of Time, uses the same technique and contains several references to Dust, including a reappearance of the character Buick Riviera.

Dust: A Tale of the Wired West—The Official Strategy Guide (Prima Publishing, 1995; re-released by the author, 2019) was written by Steve Schwartz in cooperation with CyberFlix.

== Plot ==
Set in 1882, the game opens by introducing the mysterious protagonist known only as "the Stranger", who is playing cards with a fictionalized version of Billy the Kid in an unknown town in the American West. The Stranger discovers that The Kid is cheating, and The Kid draws his gun and begins firing. After stabbing The Kid with an ornate Plains Indian dagger, The Stranger runs out of the saloon and escapes. In the early morning hours, The Stranger finds himself in the desert town of Diamondback, New Mexico, whose inhabitants treat him with suspicion. The Stranger discovers that there is a target range, a general store, a saloon, a brothel, and a mining camp with a cockfighting ring (though the mining camp cannot be visited). The Mayor's daughter, Marie Macintosh, recognizes The Stranger. It is revealed that The Stranger has some renown for fighting in the Comanche Wars.

The Stranger trades for a new pair of boots which were recovered from a corpse. He then learns that local sheriff William Purvis was recently murdered, and that a local resident who immigrated from Malmö, Sweden has Purvis' six-shot revolver concealed in the bucket of the well from which he waters his pigs. During the night, The Stranger takes the stolen revolver for himself. Later, The Stranger uses a distraction to steal a cache of ammunition from Levon Deadnettle by giving him some risqué burlesque photographs to put in his collection. The Stranger has to save "Help", a Chinese storekeeper, whose shop is about to be burnt down by brothers Cobb and Dale Belcher, drunkard troublemakers who come from a battered family. The two were motivated to drive out "Help" because U.S. President Chester A. Arthur had recently signed the Chinese Exclusion Act. The Stranger uses force to stop the two men, winning support from much of the town and receiving the post of town sheriff. In doing so, however, The Stranger attracts the attention of The Kid, who travels to Diamondback.

A woman whom locals call "Sonoma", one of the few remaining members of the fictional Yunni Tribe, asks The Stranger to recover five sacred objects belonging to her tribe, in exchange for helping him find the legendary Devil's Breath silver mine. Other tasks for The Stranger include helping Nate Trotter, a local rancher, treat his melancholia and saving the life of Herodotus Mezamee. Mezamee is an African-American poker player who is being hunted by corrupt bounty hunters because he killed a white man in self-defense.

The Kid arrives, sending in gunmen ahead of him to kill The Stranger, but The Stranger eliminates the attackers and kills The Kid in the duel that follows. Then he returns the Yunni objects to "Sonoma". Keeping her word, Sonoma helps the player gain access to the Devil's Breath silver mine, the entrance to which is hidden under the town's abandoned schoolhouse.

In the mine, The Stranger encounters a mysterious Guardian who reveals that The Stranger's actual name is Ahote—in reality a Hopi name meaning "restless one". The Guardian discloses that The Stranger is a member of the Yunni tribe who was separated at birth, and is destined to help restore the Yunni tribe. The Guardian tasks him with one final puzzle while also urging Ahote to remove a box that appears. He explains that early Spanish colonists massacred much of the Yunni tribe in their attempt to steal the box. Ahote solves a puzzle, which reveals that the box is filled with treasure, but then Ahote is held at gunpoint by Radisson Bloodstone-Hayes, a wealthy English aristocrat who seeks to take the treasure for his own gain. Making use of mystical Yunni rituals, Ahote performs an invocation to summon the Yunni Thunderbird. The apparition strikes Hayes down and kills him.

Upon leaving the mine with the treasure, Ahote finds the town gathered to meet him. He is offered five choices on what to do with the treasure. The game's five endings depend on what choice the player picks. Ahote can go into the ranching business with Nate Trotter, go into the lead business with Mayor Cosimo Macintosh, run away with Marie to live in opulence, leave town with the treasure, or give the treasure to Sonoma to help rebuild the Yunni tribe.

== Development ==
Dust was built from a script of 400 pages.

== Reception ==
Reception

Review scores
Publication	Score
Next Generation	4/5
MacUser	4.5/5
NewMedia	"Thumbs Up"
Electronic Entertainment	4/5

Awards
Publication	Award
Macworld	Best Multimedia Game 1995
Inside Mac Games	Best Adventure Game 1995 (finalist)

Dust was a commercial failure; Chris Hudak of GameSpot later wrote that it "drew high praise from critics but still somehow sold less than 50,000 copies". According to Jack Neely of Metro Pulse, its sales reached roughly 30,000 units by 1999.

Reviewing the Macintosh version, a critic for Next Generation summarized that "Dust fulfills all the requirements for a successful adventure: largely nonlinear, multiple solutions to problems, multiple story endings, no hand-holding (yes, you can die), and a strong but not constricting plotline." He said that the characters having only their mouths animated looks "hokey" but is an acceptable sacrifice for more dialogue and gameplay (since presenting all the dialogue in full-motion video would have been impossible due to space constraints). Additionally praising the fully 3D environment and the real-time interactions between characters, he gave the game four out of five stars.

The editors of Macworld gave Dust their 1995 "Best Multimedia Game" award. Steven Levy of the magazine summarized, "All in all, Dust is a high-spirited period romp that puts the fun back in computer adventuring." Recommending the game in PC Magazine's 1995 Christmas buyer's guide, Bernard Yee called Dust "a refreshing mix of adventure and first-person action." Writing in the 1996 edition of The Macintosh Bible, Bart Farkas stated that "PowerPC technology has allowed computer games to venture ever closer into the realm of virtual reality. No game comes as close as Dust".
