= Radical Castle =

1986 video game

- Opening title screenshot
- Publisher: None
- Designer: Christopher Kent Wigginton
- Engine: World Builder
- Platform: Macintosh
- Release: 1986
- Genre: Adventure game
- Mode: Single player

Radical Castle is a point-and-click adventure game released for Macintosh in 1986, developed in World Builder and distributed as shareware by Christopher Kent Wigginton.

The player assumes the role of a 'Squire', who after mistaking the princess for a serving wench, is given a choice by the King between death and a quest to recover an oracle stolen by a wizard. At one point of the game, an area identical to the opening screen of Enchanted Scepters is shown. If the player continues, a prompt is given encouraging the purchase of Enchanted Scepters from Silicon Beach Software.

The game was distributed on magazine shareware collection disks, Macintosh user group mail-outs, and pre-Internet online services. Gaming historian Richard Moss described it as a standout amongst early World Builder games, popular with players due to its Monty Python humour.

At the height of its popularity, the game made the top 100 downloads on GEnie. It can be played on a modern computer using Mini vMac. Macscene.net featured it as their "Retro game of the week" in August 2010. The review praised the visuals, sound effects and storyline. MacUser cited Radical Castle as an example of World Builder's "ability to allow authors to design commercial-quality adventure games." In 1987, Macworld selected Radical Castle as a runner-up to Deep Angst as the best World Builder game.
