= Timelapse (video game) =

1996 video game

- Developer: GTE Interactive Media
- Publishers: GTE Interactive Media, Barracuda (1998 re-release)
- Designer: Lori Nichols
- Platforms: Windows, Mac OS
- Release: October 15, 1996
- Genres: Graphic adventure, puzzle

Timelapse (sometimes Timelapse: Ancient Civilizations) is a 1996 graphic adventure game developed and published by GTE Entertainment. Inspired by the game Myst, it tasks the player with the rescue of an archaeologist trapped in another dimension. The player navigates a series of time portals to locations such as ancient Egypt, Maya and the prehistoric Puebloan civilization, while solving puzzles and searching for clues to the archaeologist's whereabouts.

Timelapse was commercially successful, with sales of 250,000 units by late 2000.

== Gameplay ==
Timelapse is a first-person graphic adventure patterned after games such as Myst. Gameplay consists of the exploration of various ancient temples and cities, and the solving of complex and difficult puzzles. The game is made up of five areas: Easter Island, Egypt, Maya, Anasazi and Atlantis.

== Plot ==
Professor Alexander Nichols, a friend of the unnamed and silent player character, has called the player to Easter Island, where he believes he has found a link to the legendary city of Atlantis. The player arrives at the island, picking up the Professor's Camera and Journal, only to realize the Professor is already gone. The Player then explores the island, finding the Professor's camp abandoned, and eventually stumbles upon a cave which contains a Timegate, with the Professor trapped inside. The player then uses this time gate to go to one of three time periods; Ancient Egypt, the Maya civilization, and the Anasazi civilisation. Each civilisation is deserted or almost deserted, with the people having recently left in mass exoduses. The player may visit the three civilisations in any order, but the Professor's journal claims that he visited them in the order listed; this is also the order of the game's four CD-ROMs. The player encounters a robot which appears to be constructed out of energy in each civilisation; this robot is not named in the game, but is referred to as "The Guardian" in official materials. The player's main goal in each civilisation is to collect a device known as a Gene Pod, which contains DNA from the culture, and install it into the Timegate.

Once the Genepods of the Egyptians, Mayans, and Anasazi are collected, the player is able to access Atlantis. The player traps the Guardian inside a stasis tube and discovers the Atlantis timegate, with Professor Nichols still trapped inside. The Professor failed to complete the timegate connections with the genepods before attempting to access Atlantis, so he remains trapped until the player character can free him. However, when the Professor is released back to Easter Island, the Timegate is destroyed, and a two-minute countdown begins, at the end of which Atlantis will launch into space.

If the player waits for the countdown to run out, the game plays a cutscene of Atlantis launching into space with the player aboard, then warping to the Atlantean homeworld. The player then sees a Message sent by the Guardian to the homeworld stating that he has with him crew members and 1 Terran (the player), who have been placed in Stasis for the remainder of the journey, and states that he was damaged, and that being in stasis repaired him. Instead of letting the countdown run out, however, the player can choose to escape from Atlantis. At this point the game shows a cutscene of Atlantis blasting off from the point of view of the player in an escape pod. The game ends with a series of newspaper headlines indicating that the Atlantean finds make the player rich and famous.

== Development ==
=== Origins ===
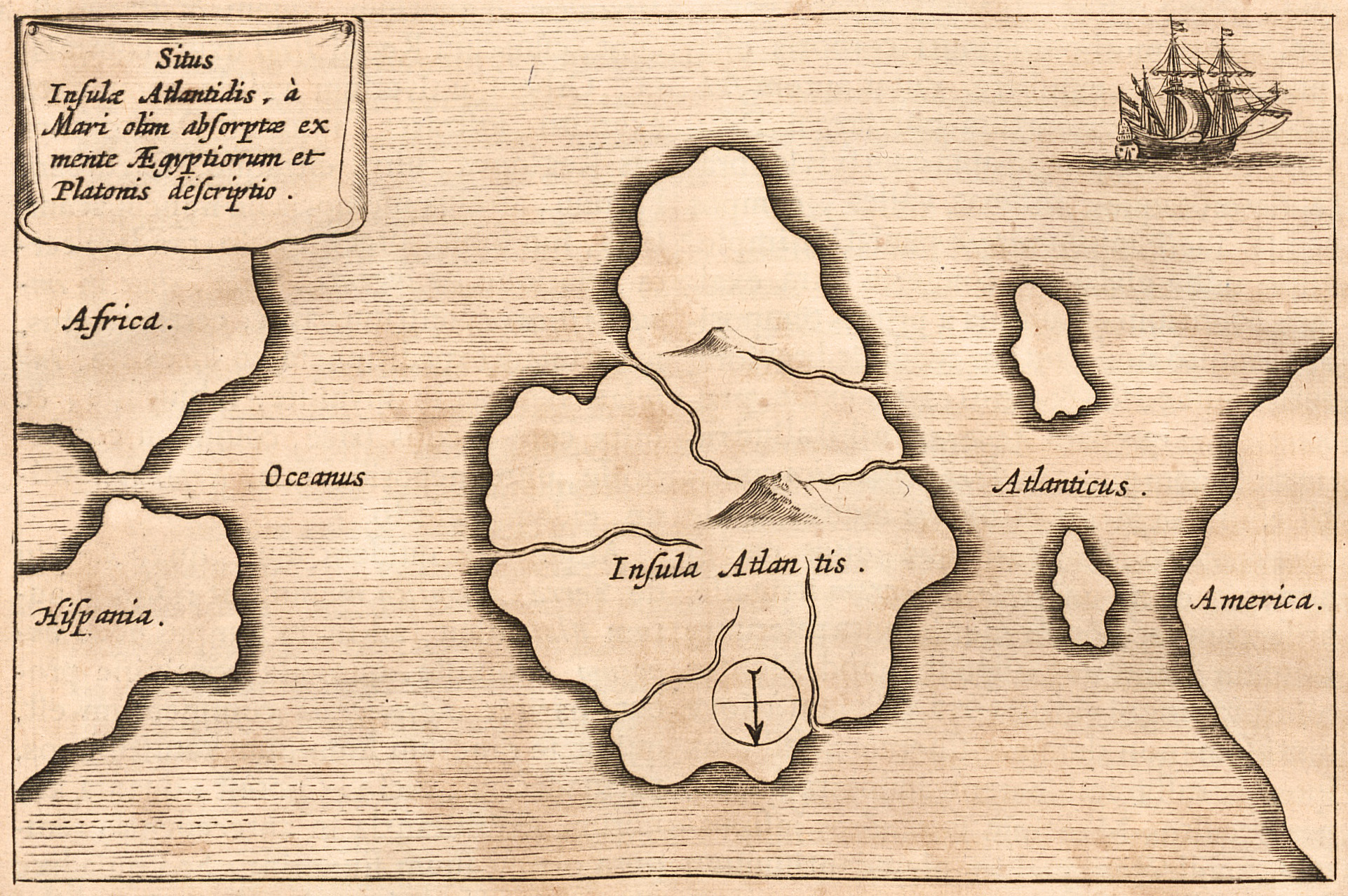
Producer Lori Nichols' fascination with the mythical island of Atlantis was a core influence on Timelapse.

Timelapse was conceived in early 1994 by lead designer and producer Lori Nichols, who had worked at GTE Entertainment since 1991. Her main inspiration for the project was Myst, which she later said had "combined puzzles, graphics, and story in a style that I had never seen before." She sought to build a superior game upon this foundation that drew from her fascination with archaeology, ancient cultures, science fiction and the myth of Atlantis. Obtaining permission from GTE Entertainment head Richard Robinson to start the project—on the condition that she work on it concurrently with her regular job at the company—Nichols approached artist Ed Deren to flesh out the idea and design a proof of concept demo.

Timelapse remained in the prototyping stage for six months: Nichols and Deren collaborated with programmer Tim Bank to create part of the Egyptian world as their demo. The art direction and game design of this early sequence were handled by Deren. Research and development of the game's technology were key focuses during this time, as the team planned to use ray-traced and pre-rendered visuals at a resolution of 640x480, a technique that Nichols said "hadn't been done before" in a game. According to marketing manager Mike Yuen, the team worked extensively with focus groups while prototyping, both to refine Timelapse and to determine players' opinions on Myst and similar adventure titles. A camera was included because these players felt that the feature would have improved Myst. Similarly, tester criticism that Myst was "devoid of life" led to an emphasis on animation in the worlds of Timelapse, according to Deren.

Following the completion of Timelapse's demo, the team submitted it for approval by the internal "product review" board at GTE Entertainment, and the company agreed to move the game into full production.

=== Production ===
Creation of Timelapse was highly collaborative. Developer CyberFlix assisted in finishing the game near the end of development. Timelapse was displayed at the 1996 Electronic Entertainment Expo (E3) in June. At the show, a writer for Computer Games Strategy Plus described it as a "visually stunning game, with full-screen ray-traced graphics".

Timelapse was released on October 15, 1996, with a list price of $70. The game shipped first in the United States, simultaneously with its Prima Games strategy book—an effort by GTE to increase bundled sales of Timelapse and its guide. At the time, GTE announced that South American, Asian, Japanese, European and British editions of the game were set to launch soon after the initial release.

== Reception ==
=== Sales and distribution ===
In January 1997, Variety reported that Timelapse and the GTE-published Titanic: Adventure Out of Time were both "selling well". However, on the 7th of that month, GTE announced its plan to shutter the majority of GTE Entertainment by March, with a final closure set for June. According to GTE's Richard Scott, the parent company "made a strategic decision that it does not need to be a primary participant in the creation and management of content." The plan to close GTE Entertainment outright came after it was unable to find a suitable buyer.

The rights to Timelapse were obtained in February 1998 by the company Barracuda, founded by Michael Kaye and Mike Yuen of the game's original team. By that point, the title's global sales had surpassed 200,000 units, of which half were sold in the United States. It had been localized in Japanese, German, French and Portuguese, and been shipped in 30 regions worldwide. In the United States, the game's strategy guide had sold above 30,000 units. Barracuda returned the game to store shelves in June, relaunched its official site in September and began selling it through online mail order in October. In mid-1999, the company announced a distribution deal with DICE Computer Games to re-distribute Timelapse in more than 12 countries across Europe. Sales of the game rose above 250,000 units worldwide by October 2000. In 2014, the game was digitally rereleased by Night Dive Studios on GOG.com.

=== Critical reviews ===
Reception

Review scores
| Publication | Score |
|---|---|
| Computer Gaming World | 3/5 |
| PC Gamer (US) | 60% |
| MacHome Journal | 3.5/5 |
| Inside Mac Games | 4.5/5 |
| Computer Games Strategy Plus | 3/5 |
| PC Games | B+ |

Award
| Publication | Award |
|---|---|
| Inside Mac Games | Best Adventure Game 1996 (finalist) |

Inside Mac Games nominated Timelapse as its pick for 1996's best adventure game, but ultimately gave the award to Titanic: Adventure Out of Time. The editors called it "the only Myst-style game of the year that 'worked'." PC Magazine included Timelapse in its 1996 holiday shopping recommendations guide.

Entertainment Weekly gave the game a C.
