= Rango (video game) =

2011 video game

Rango: The Video Game
- PAL Xbox 360 cover art
- Developer: Behaviour Interactive
- Publishers: Electronic Arts; Paramount Digital Entertainment
- Director: James Ward Byrkit
- Producer: Behrouz Bayat
- Designer: Paolo Pace
- Composer: Lorne Balfe
- Platforms: Nintendo DS, PlayStation 3, Wii, Xbox 360
- Release: EU: February 25, 2011; NA: March 1, 2011; AU: March 3, 2011
- Genres: Action-adventure, platform
- Mode: Single-player

Rango is a 2011 action-adventure video game developed by Behaviour Interactive and published by Electronic Arts and Paramount Digital Entertainment for the Nintendo DS, PlayStation 3, Wii, & Xbox 360. It is a video game sequel to the 2011 movie of the same name.

== Plot ==
A meteorite crashes into a sand dune near the home of Beans, Rango's desert iguana girlfriend. The impact of the explosion scatters fragments everywhere. Beans's father walks up the hill and examines the crater, but he is taken in a flash of green light.

15 years later, Rango, the chameleon from the film, enters the scene, asleep on his roadrunner, "Excelsior". He wakes up and makes his way into the Gas Can Saloon. Just then, Slim walks in with parts of a meteor, and Rango opens it, vaporizing Slim. Explaining the plotline of how he first saw the rocks, he says that Bad Bill was involved. He teamed up with the Jenkins cousins in an unnatural alliance. Rango tracks down Bill at the barber shop, their hideout. Rango blows up the barbershop, and Bill escapes, but not before Rango gets one of the rocks.

As Rango continues the story, Bill tries to hijack the water train. Rango catches up with him, and he attempts to follow him. The henchmen even sabotaged some parts of the train; the back train up to the coal cart burned down after the dynamite was burned. Rango finds Bill and gets the next rock, but the train explodes, and Rango escapes on Excelsior.

Rango catches up with Bill, and Beans accompanies him into the Forbidden Mine at the foot of the majestic cliffs of Dry Creek. After making it into Area 102 and finding Bill there, he escapes into Andromeda 5 and hides near a machine gun. After trying to shoot Rango, failing in the process, Rango blows up the hideout, retrieving the 3rd rock.

Rango tells everyone that the rocks are meteorite fragments. As Buford cooks up "Zucchini muffins", Rango resumes his story. Hiding out in an RV, where a man takes vengeance on aliens, Rango defeats the bad guys and gets the fourth rock.

Rango gets knocked out at Dirt, and Beans is kidnapped. Thrown in jail, Rango escapes and blows up Bill's stagecoach, which keeps Beans freeing her and collects the 5th rock.

Beans enters, and Rango tells the others how, outside the cantina, Rattlesnake Jake returned for revenge. A showdown begins, and Rango defeat Jake as the 6th rock comes out of his mouth.

Then, Rango enters Mr. Black's laboratory and destroys it with his genetic, "morally incorrect" experiments. He goes out to stop the Zombies he made, but it is too late. They set fire to Dirt and escape, but Rango defeats them all and pursues Bill. Distracted, Bill gets hit by a car's windshield while Rango gets another rock.

Rango continues his story of falling into a 3d graphics world and escaping on his windup fish toy, Mr. Timms, getting another rock. He falls off and is knocked unconscious. Hallucinating, he is picked up by Excelsior.

Beans had a key around her neck, revealing it to be a safe deposit box key. It's also revealed that Beans' father scattered the rocks. Taking the last one, they forge into alien technology, zapping the citizens. Mr. Black tells them to get on the clock tower, which is a rocket. Going to a shuttle near Mars, Rango, Mr. Black, and Beans destroy the aliens. Beans reunites with her father, and Rango is a hero once again.

== Reception ==
Reception

Aggregate score
Aggregator	Score			
Aggregator	DS	PS3	Wii	Xbox 360
Metacritic	55/100	65/100	52/100	68/100

Review scores
Publication	Score			
Publication	DS	PS3	Wii	Xbox 360
Game Informer	N/A	7.5/10	N/A	7.5/10
GameRevolution	N/A	C	N/A	C
GameSpot	N/A	7/10	N/A	7/10
NGamer	38%	N/A	49%	N/A
Nintendo Life	N/A	N/A	4/10	N/A
Nintendo Power	7/10	N/A	5/10	N/A
Nintendo World Report	7/10	N/A	5.5/10	N/A
PlayStation Official Magazine – UK	N/A	6/10	N/A	N/A
Official Xbox Magazine (US)	N/A	N/A	N/A	8/10
PALGN	3/10	N/A	N/A	N/A
Common Sense Media	2/5	4/5	4/5	4/5

Rango: The Video Game received "mixed or average reviews" on all platforms according to the review aggregation website Metacritic. While acknowledging its gameplay and other elements as commendable, the majority of critics noted the game's short play time and replay value as a major pitfall.
