= After Zero =

2019 short story by Greg Egan

- Short story by Greg Egan
- Country: Australia
- Language: English
- Genre: Science fiction

Publication
- Published in: Phase Change: New SF Energies
- Media type: Print
- Publication date: 2022

"After Zero" is a science fiction short story by Australian writer Greg Egan, first published in the anthology Phase Change: New SF Energies edited by Matthew Chrulew in 2022. It describes the efforts to stop climate change, both from a scientific and sociological perspective. The short story was also included in the collection Sleep and the Soul in 2023. "Crisis Actors", another story from this collection, also deals with climate change.

== Plot ==
In 2060, Latifa (also the protagonist from "Zero for Conduct") is pursuing a project to launch a plasma-powered scattering device to the first Lagrange point between Earth and Sun. It is supposed reduce the amount of sunlight reaching Earth in an attempt to cool down its record-breaking temperatures caused by climate change. Her project competes for funding against another known as Time Portal, which aims to send four humans into the past to change history by using a rotating ring dragging spacetime with it (as described by the Kerr metric). Although this project is complete nonsense, it receives twice as many votes. In 2072, Latifa can proudly watch her struggle having paid off, although she explains to her grandson that they cannot literally see the device in the sky.

== Reviews ==
Russell Letson wrote in the Locus Magazine, that the short story is "another engineering procedural" and that this "hard-SF procedural built on ingenious and unlikely engineering efforts" is "another familiar Egan pattern". Furthermore, the story is "a kind of The Man Who Sold the Moon scenario, extending over decades" and features a "dire" problem.
