= DreamFactory =

American software company

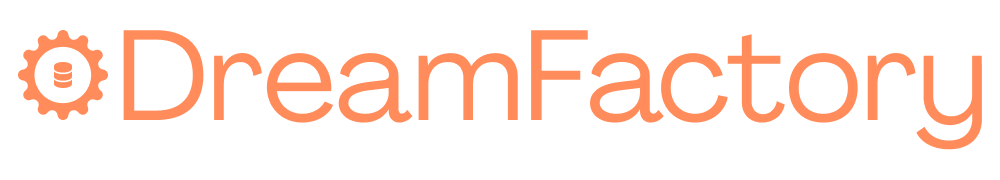
- Industry: Software development
- Founder: Bill Appleton
- Headquarters: Las Vegas, Nevada
- Key people: Terence Bennett (CEO)
- Website: dreamfactory.com

DreamFactory is an American software developer based in Las Vegas. It develops both commercial and open-source software that provides self-hosted integration and API generation services to multiple applications in cloud-based or on-premise environments.

== History ==
DreamFactory was founded in 1998 by technology entrepreneur Bill Appleton. The company's flagship software, DreamFactory, was developed during his tenure as president of Cyberflix. The software was used in Cyberflix's CD-ROM video game Titanic: Adventure Out of Time. DreamFactory began work on its foundation development environment in 2002. By 2004 they released their first product, SBuilder. Ultimately, DreamFactory sold a series of products on the SalesForce AppExchange including DreamTeam, SnapShot, OrgView, and Sbuilder. The product evolved over time until 2015, when the current iteration of DreamFactory first began in the current GitHub Repo. This new version of DreamFactory was built in Laravel and was originally entirely Open Sourced. The original team built a business model on only selling support, but by 2018 this business model failed. The company was sold, and the decision was made to close source some connectors and features.

== Funding ==
DreamFactory took on a $5.6 million Series A round of funding from New Enterprise Associates in 2006. Greg Papadopoulos, former chief technology officer at Sun Microsystems and a partner at NEA, sat on the DreamFactory board during this time.

In 2018, DreamFactory was acquired by Xenon Partners, a tech-centric private equity fund that has funded companies such as Right Signature, Dropbox, Packagecloud and Earth Class Mail.

== Service ==
DreamFactory's core product is the same between Open Source and Commercial Versions. DreamFactory can run on Linux, Windows, and Docker and includes security controls and management services for Roles Based Access, API Key Management, Rate Limiting, Authentication, Logging, and Service-Side Scripting. The DreamFactory Scripting is in PHP, Python, and NodeJS.

DreamFactory has the following native database connectors:

- AlloyDB
- Apache Hive
- Azure DocumentDB
- Cassandra
- CosmosDB
- CouchDB
- DB2
- DynamoDB
- Firebird
- IBM Informix
- MariaDB
- Mem SQL
- MongoDB
- MySQL
- Oracle
- PostGres
- Redshift
- Salesforce
- SAP SQL Anywhere
- Snowflake
- SQL Server
- SQLite
