= Sleep and the Soul =

2023 short story collection by Greg Egan

- Author: Greg Egan
- Language: English
- Genre: Science fiction, Hard science fiction
- Publication date: 2023
- ISBN: 978-1-922240-46-0

Sleep and the Soul is a collection of ten science-fiction short stories by Australian writer Greg Egan, published in 2023.

== Contents ==
- You and Whose Army? (2020)
- This Is Not the Way Home (2019)
- Zeitgeber (2019)
- Crisis Actors (2022)
- Sleep and the Soul (2021)
- After Zero (2022)
- Dream Factory (2022)
- Light Up the Clouds (2021)
- Night Running (2023)
- Solidity (2022)

== Reception ==
=== Reviews ===
Russell Letson writes in the Locus Magazine, to be "struck by how consistent Egan has been in his ethical and social concerns; by his relentless pursuit of philosophical questions; by the sometimes daunting sophistication of his mathematical, topological, and cosmological speculations; and by the surprising ways he turns and re-turns his imagination to those questions. Even after seven volumes of short work (and more than a dozen novels and novellas) these variations on themes never get old."

Letson further writes about the title story in the Locus Magazine, that it is "an intriguing piece presented as an alternate history where the Jonbar point is a biological change, not a historical one." He adds that "Egan’s logical working out of the consequences of his central idea is fascinating, and the story is involving."

=== Awards ===
"This is Not the Way Home" was nominated for the Japanese Seiun Award in 2021. "Light Up the Clouds" reached the 4th place in Asimov's Readers Poll in 2022. "Solidity" reached the 8th place in the Locus Award for Best Novelette in 2023 and the 5th place in Asimov's Reader Poll in 2023 and won the Japanese Seiun Award in 2024.
