= Crisis Actors (short story) =

2019 short story by Greg Egan

- Short story by Greg Egan
- Country: Australia
- Language: English
- Genre: Science fiction

Publication
- Publication date: 2022

"Crisis Actors" is a science fiction short story by Australian writer Greg Egan. It describes the journey of a denier of climate change. The short story was included in the anthology Tomorrow’s Parties: Life in the Anthropocene edited by Jonathan Strahan in 2022 and the collection Sleep and the Soul in 2023. "After Zero", another story from this collection, also deals with climate change.

== Plot ==
Carl denies climate change and furthermore thinks that news about its devastating effects are staged with crisis actors. Determined to expose the false game, Carl travels into a region recently hit by a cyclone, but is only confronted with real suffering.

== Reviews ==
Russell Letson wrote in the Locus Magazine, that the short story "has a kind of inside-out intrigue plot" and the "tight point of view immerses us in Carl’s actions." Furthermore, he compared it to the short story Sleep and the Soul also appearing in the collection Sleep and the Soul and wrote about its similar premise that "the contortions it causes in its holders’ belief systems (and actions) echo Carl's delusions."

Gary K. Wolfe wrote in the Locus Magazine, that Greg Egan, "from whom we might have expected the most arcane variety of hard SF, instead provides a bruising satire of climate deniers and anti-science attitudes."

Ian Randell wrote in Physics World, that "Egan paints a delicately layered picture of someone in the grip of doublethink (accepting conflicting views about a subject, mostly due to political indoctrination) that still, in keeping with the book’s overarching theme, offers hints of hope in the end."
