= FX Fighter =

1995 video game

- Developer: Argonaut Software
- Publisher: GTE Entertainment
- Producers: Jerry Albright, Nick Halstead
- Designers: Jaid Mindang, Gary O'Connell
- Programmers: Simon Hargrave, Steve Thompson
- Composers: Martin Gwynn Jones, Justin Scharvona
- Engine: BRender
- Platform: MS-DOS
- Release: June 16, 1995
- Genre: Fighting
- Modes: Single-player, multiplayer

FX Fighter is a 3D fighting game for MS-DOS. It was developed by Argonaut Software and published by GTE Entertainment in June 1995. It is an early realtime 3D fighter, originally meant for Super NES using the Super FX chip, on which Argonaut was collaborating together with Nintendo. OEM versions have support for 3D acceleration, bundled with 3D graphics accelerator cards such as the Diamond Monster 3D. A sequel, FX Fighter Turbo, was released in 1996.

This game has no relation to Hudson Soft's cancelled FX Fighter for PC-FX, which was conceived around the same time.

== Gameplay ==
Gameplay screenshot

The game features 8 different characters, 8 different arenas, movie cutscenes, and 40 attacks per fighter. The player selects a character to face against 8 of the best fighters in the universe, with the prize being the most powerful weapon in the universe.

== Characters ==
- Magnon, from Inferno: A primeval volcanic wasteland.
- Sheba, from Rhomb: A world of vast savannahs ruled by the highly respected feran monarchy.
- Venam, from Peres: A planet dominated by tropical forests and caves.
- Jake, from Sentral: Massively overpopulated and polluted industrialized world.
- Kiko, from Lusk: Mountainous planet with low technology but a developed culture.
- Siren, from Ursae: A water world completely covered by a single ocean.
- Ashraf, from Karlak: Temperate planet with an ancient culture.
- Cyben, from Axone: A world rich in mineral deposits but with no atmosphere.
- Rygil, from Anarchis: A high gravity world owned by the cadre.

== Cancelled Super NES version ==
FX Fighter was originally conceived as a Super NES titled Fighting Polygon. It was first shown in November 1994 at Nintendo's Shoshinkai Software Exhibition in Japan, using the Super FX 2 chip to deliver polygon graphics, otherwise unattainable on the console. At the Winter Consumer Electronics Show in January 1995, GTE Entertainment and Nintendo announced that they would be jointly developing and publishing the game.

The game was previewed in GamePro and Nintendo Power. It was compared to Sega's Virtua Fighter. Although the approximately 500 polygons per character was tame compared to Virtua Fighter and Tekken on 32-bit hardware, FX Fighter's capabilities were still impressive considering the SNES's older 16-bit hardware.

After Nintendo decided to port Killer Instinct to the Super NES, FX Fighter was canceled by Nintendo to avoid competition between the two games.

== Reception ==
Reception

Review scores
| Publication | Score |
|---|---|
| Next Generation | 4/5 |
| CD Player | 7/10 |
| Entertainment Weekly | A− |
| Computer Game Review | 259/300 |

For the launch of FX Fighter, GTE Entertainment shipped 200,000 units to stores and dedicated more than $2 million to its promotional campaign.

Entertainment Weekly gave the PC version an A− and wrote that the game was as good as any that was offered on home consoles, but remarked that playing games on a television screen was better than a computer screen.

Next Generation reviewed the PC version of the game, rating it four stars out of five, and stated that "Even without the spectacular visuals, FX Fighter would be better than Mortal Kombat II - and that's saying a lot."

Frank Snyder of Computer Game Review was largely positive toward the game, calling it "definitely worth checking out".

== In other media ==
A comic based on the video game was created by Jim Lee of Wildstorm Productions, which was hosted by GTE Interactive Media's web site.

== Legacy ==
FX Fighter Turbo
- Developer: Argonaut Software
- Publisher: GTE Entertainment
- Engine: BRender
- Platform: Windows 95
- Release: November 5, 1996
- Genre: Fighting
- Modes: Single-player, multiplayer

FX Fighter Turbo is a sequel released for Windows 95 in 1996 with new characters, moves, environments, costumes, special effects, network play, and support the S3 Graphics chipset. It was influenced by the fatalities in Mortal Kombat.

== See also ==
- List of fighting games
