= Ray's Maze =

1990 video game

- Developer: Ray Dunakin
- Engine: World Builder
- Platform: Macintosh
- Release: 1990
- Genre: Adventure
- Mode: Single-player

Ray's Maze is a graphic adventure game, released in 1990.

Ray's Maze was created with the World Builder game creation system by San Diego, California-based developer Ray Dunakin. With no formal training, Ray started making World Builder games on the family computer with his son in 1989. After creating several simple games together, Ray started developing a complex puzzle game. This ended up becoming Ray's Maze and was released as shareware.

The player takes on the role of "Fearless" Frank Farley exploring an interdimensional maze through teleportation devices known as "jump doors." Their goal is to both escape the maze and collect enough valuables to cover the cost of the journey, $1,000. Starting in a store where the player can purchase items to take with them, they then must travel through hundreds of scenes across several different worlds, all while fighting monsters and evading traps.

== Legacy ==
Three more games were released following the success of Ray's Maze. Two were direct sequels and one was a spiritual successor in the style of the Ray's Maze series. All of the games were created with World Builder, and all were released as shareware. In exchange for registration, players would receive documents with tips and maps. Ray's games had a huge impact on the Mac community, inspiring others to create games as well.

=== Another Fine Mess ===
Released in 1992, this is the first sequel to Ray's Maze. The player again takes on the role of Frank exploring another interdimensional maze and solving puzzles.

=== A Mess O'Trouble ===
The third and final game in the Ray's Maze series was released in 1994. It is the largest of the three and allows the player play as the female character "Daredevil" Dawn. An updated version was also released for Mac OS X in 2015

=== Twisted! ===
Twisted! was a successor to the Ray's Maze series, released in 1997. The player takes on the role of a storm chaser who is transported to a strange world and must solve puzzles to find their way home.
