= Lunicus =

1993 video game

- Developer: Cyberflix
- Publishers: Cyberflix (1993); Paramount Interactive (1994)
- Programmer: Bill Appleton
- Artists: Jamie Wicks; Susan Metros
- Writer: Ben Calica
- Composer: Scott Scheinbaum
- Platforms: Windows 3.1, Mac OS
- Release: NA: April 1994
- Genre: Adventure

Lunicus is a 1993 video game developed by Cyberflix and published by Paramount Interactive. It shares many traits in both graphical style and gameplay with some of Cyberflix's other games, like Jump Raven. It was rated as 1993 CD-ROM game of the year in the magazine MacWorld.

It was released for the Mac and Windows 3.1, and was one of many adventure games released to capitalize on the adoption of CD-ROM drives.

== Gameplay ==
Lunicus is primarily an adventure game; in between combat missions players may wander the Moon base they are stationed on and talk to the various non-player characters contained within, with full voice acting and some stilted animation which is characterized on the game packaging as "Talking Cyber Puppets".

During the combat missions, the player enters various parts of Earth and cleans out alien infestations either on foot or in a vehicle. The player's weapons are relatively static throughout the game, including machine guns, rocket launchers, and grenade attacks. While in the vehicle, the player can opt to duck inside one of the buildings to find additional ammunition and supplies. Nearly all buildings (except for quest-specific ones) are identical.

The game's latter missions involve defending the Moon base from attack by the alien forces, and attacking the alien mothership.

The player's activities are seen from a first person perspective, but they can only face one of four directions, turning left or right on a tile-based grid similar to games such as Scarab of Ra. Direct targeting is accomplished with the mouse, while movement is accomplished with either the mouse or the game's heads up display.

The game includes several pre-rendered full motion video sequences, usually bookending the combat sequences. Several difficulty levels are available, which alter the strength and numbers of the enemy waves.

Nearly all graphics in the game are pre-rendered sprites, including walls and city components.

== Plot ==
As the game begins, the player is stationed on the United Nations moon base, Lunicus, to defend against the threat of the alien attack, led by the Hive Queen.

The aliens are present as an archeological dig in 2023 unearths several alien artifacts, one of which is mistakenly activated and alerts the alien force.

== Development ==
Lunicus was the first game developed by CyberFlix, a startup company that Bill Appleton founded months ago. It was created with DreamFactory, a development environment programmed by CyberFlix founder William Appleton, who had previously designed the Macintosh software SuperCard.

Lunicus was released in a wide capacity in April 1994, after a limited release in mid-to-late 1993. After the game's limited release, in late 1993, the company signed a three-year distribution deal with Paramount Interactive to handle mass market distribution of CyberFlix's games, including the wide release, which was released in April 1994.

== Reception ==
In its initial Macintosh release, Lunicus was a commercial success, with sales of 50,000 units by August 1994. Around August 28, another 50,000 units of the game were shipped for Microsoft Windows. CyberFlix's Erik Quist expected the game to sell 100,000 units overall "by Christmas", Barbara Kantrowitz of Newsweek reported at the time. By January 3, sales of Lunicus had reached close to the 100,000 mark.

Macworld presented Lunicus with its 1993 "Best CD-ROM Game" award. The magazine's Steven Levy called the game "a mindblower", and praised its visuals and fast-paced action. Singling out the game's high frame rate as its best feature, he wrote, "Unlike other CD-ROM games, which have an annoying lag between the time you pull the trigger and the time something happens, Lunicus moves with sufficient speed to keep you in the action."

Computer Gaming World in August 1993 criticized the varying quality of the graphics but concluded that Lunicus was "CD-full of fist-fighting action ... fancy footwork and a solid punch". In April 1994 the magazine said that the game had challenging fights but "graphic quality is mixed and begs more realistic detail".
