= Dream Factory (short story) =

2022 short story by Greg Egan

- Short story by Greg Egan
- Country: Australia
- Language: English
- Genre: Science fiction

Publication
- Published in: Clarkesworld Magazine
- Publication type: Periodical
- Media type: Print
- Publication date: April 2022

"Dream Factory" is a science-fiction short story by Australian writer Greg Egan, first published in the Clarkesworld Magazine in April 2022. It describes the development of an app to watch the dreams of pets. The short story was included in the collection Sleep and the Soul in 2023.

== Plot ==
In the near future, people put electrodes in their pet's brains to make them do tricks. James intends to expose this as nonsense and uses the cat Pawpaw to program an app, which shows the dreams of pets. But instead of the world realizing that they should not mess with their brains, the app goes viral after the recommendation of a famous pop singer. James then begins to work on a fake decoy app to undermine his own success.

== Reviews ==
Victoria Silverwolf wrote in Tangent Online that Egan "creates unusually plausible speculative technology, while also demonstrating a profound understanding of the cultural impact of social media". She further adds that "subtle hints of a near future when today’s disturbing trends have continued in an all too believable way add a sense of authenticity to a story that will appeal to many, whether or not they are ailurophiles."

Karen Burnham wrote in Locus that the short story "might be a bit long for its premise, but it’s a great look at a modern day intersection of different technologies."

Russell Letson also wrote in Locus that the short story is "a canny and rewarding hacking project."
