= Andrew Nelson (author) =

Andrew Nelson is a writer and professor living in New Orleans. He worked as a senior producer of Britannica.com, a creative director for Cyberflix, a visiting professor at Loyola University New Orleans, and a Public Relations and Social Media Account professional at Peter A. Mayer Advertising in New Orleans. Two computer games he developed for CyberFlix – Titanic: Adventure Out of Time (1996) and Dust: A Tale of the Wired West (1995) – were bestselling PC game and Macintosh Games of the Year. In 2007 he was awarded a Lowell Thomas Award for his work with the Society. He is a writer-at-large for Salon, National Geographic Traveler, ReadyMade, The New York Times, Via magazine, Weekend Sherpa and San Francisco Magazine (which featured Nelson's monthly history column).

Nelson is a Missouri School of Journalism Alumni.

== Projects ==
Harlem Renaissance websites were developed by Andrew Nelson and Tom Michael as a spotlight for Encyclopædia Britannica Online, to promote the encyclopedia and to serve customers in schools by observing Black History Month. He developed the format for National Geographic Traveler's award-winning "Insiders" series that uses social media to explore a travel destination. He ran a Twitter guided travel project for the National Geographic Society in 2010. The resultant story "Tweet Me in Miami" for National Geographic Traveler won the Folio Award for magazine writing in 2010. His @WWIIToday Twitter feed won a 2009 Public Relations Society of America award and endorsements from the Pritzker Military Library and CNN News.

== Awards ==
=== Websites ===
- 2000: Site of the Day, All About Oscar, Yahoo
- 1999: Hot Site, Harlem, USA Today
- 1999: Cool Site, Site of the Day, The Martini, Netscape
- 1998: Blue Web'n educational award, Lost Secrets, Pacific Bell
- 1998: Site of the Day, Clicking Anastasia, Yahoo

=== Games ===
- 1998: Best Animation CD-ROM/Games, Titanic, Animation Magazine
- 1997: Game of the Year, Titanic, MacHome Journal
- 1996: Game of the Year, Dust, Macworld
- 1994: Game of the Year, Jump Raven, Apple-Japan

=== Journalism ===
- 2011: Folio Award, Silver. For magazine article "Tweet Me in Miami," National Geographic Traveler
- 2007: Lowell Thomas Prize for Travel Writing; Client: National Geographic Traveler
- 2004: Lowell Thomas Prize for Travel Writing; Client: National Geographic Traveler
- 1997: Andrew Nelson: "20 to Watch in Multimedia", Daily Variety
- 1987: Young Journalists winner, Rolling Stone

=== Public relations ===
- 2011: Adrian Award (Platinum) for Public Relations (Client: The National World War II Museum), HSMAI
- 2011: Adrian Award (Gold) for Public Relations (Client: The National World War II Museum), HSMAI
- 2011: Adrian Award (Bronze) for Social Media (Client: The National World War II Museum), HSMAI
- 2010: Silver Quill:, Merit Award for Twitter Campaign (Client: The National World War II Museum), International Association of Business Communicators
- 2010: Public Relations Campaign for The Solomon Victory Theater Opening (Client: The National World War II Museum), Press Club of New Orleans
- 2009: Silver Award for Twitter campaign (Client: The National World War II Museum), Public Relations Society of America
