= Paramount Digital Entertainment =

Video game system in 1993

Paramount Digital Entertainment, Inc.
- Formerly: Paramount Interactive (1993–1994)
- Type: Division
- Industry: Movie and video Game distribution
- Founded: May 1993; 33 years ago
- Defunct: August 8, 2019; 7 years ago
- Successor: Paramount Games Studio
- Headquarters: Los Angeles, California, U.S.
- Parent: Paramount Pictures
- Website: www.paramount.com

Paramount Digital Entertainment, Inc. (formerly known as Paramount Interactive) was a subsidiary of Paramount Pictures that distributed movies and video games digitally via various platforms including online, mobile, virtual reality and portable devices.

== History ==
Paramount Digital Entertainment was originally formed in 1993 under the name of Paramount Interactive, and operated under the newly-formed Paramount Technology Group, this company was short lived (lasting until 1994), before Paramount licensed its properties to other publishers unrelated to them. The company's first title is Richard Scarry's Busytown, a best-selling children's educational title.

The company had development partnerships with Medior, Music Pen, Novotrade International and Cyberflix to produce games. In November 1993, Cyberflix struck a deal with Paramount Interactive to handle marketing and distribution of its video game titles.

In early 1994, the company partnered with Tachyon Inc. to develop video games based on Star Trek: Deep Space Nine. In March 1994, the company partnered with Interplay Productions to bundle its equipment with other software. In mid 1994, the company signed a deal with NEC to distribute titles for Japan. In mid 1994, the company partnered with the Sundance Institute to develop games based on its properties.

In June 1994, Paramount Interactive was merged and absorbed into Viacom New Media after Viacom acquired Paramount Communications.

In 1995, the company decided to launch a web online division with the name, Paramount Digital Entertainment, a reformatting of Paramount Technology Group, operating under Paramount Television and other Paramount units.

In 2009, the brand was expanded into video games, returning Paramount to the video game industry, alongside with also creating content (shows and films) for streaming platforms. In 2010, the company signed a deal with Red Hour Films to produce digital series. The company became dormant on August 8, 2019 after their streaming program Bajillion Dollar Propertie$ ended.

In 2022, Paramount Global reentered the gaming industry through their licensing brand Paramount Game Studios. In June 2026 after Paramount merged with Skydance Media to form Paramount Skydance in August 2025, their video game business expanded as they when they merged with Skydance Interactive and Skydance New Media to form Paramount Games Studio where they will develop and publish games in-house.

== List of video games ==
=== as Paramount Interactive ===
Title	Release date	Platform(s)
Lenny's Music Toons	1993	Microsoft Windows, Mac OS
Richard Scarry's Busytown	1993	MS-DOS
Rock, Rap 'N Roll	1993	Microsoft Windows, Mac OS
Movie Select	1993	Microsoft Windows, Mac OS
Jump Raven	1994	Microsoft Windows, Mac OS
Lunicus	April 1994	Windows 3.1, Mac OS
Bebe's Kids	April 1994	Super NES
Lenny’s Multimedia Circus	1994	Microsoft Windows, Mac OS
Richard Scarry's How Things Work in Busytown	1994	MS-DOS, Mac OS

=== as Paramount Digital Entertainment ===
Title	Release date	Platform(s)
Star Trek DAC	May 13, 2009	PlayStation 3, Xbox 360, Microsoft Windows, Mac OS X
The Warriors: Street Brawl	September 23, 2009	Xbox Live Arcade, Microsoft Windows, Mac OS X
Grease	August 24, 2010	Wii, Nintendo DS
Days of Thunder	February 22, 2011	PlayStation 3, Xbox 360, PlayStation Portable, iOS
Rango	March 1, 2011	PlayStation 3, Xbox 360, Wii, Nintendo DS
The Adventures of Tintin: The Game	December 6, 2011	PlayStation 3, Xbox 360, Wii, Nintendo 3DS, Microsoft Windows, iOS, Android, Symbian
Star Trek	April 23, 2013	PlayStation 3, Xbox 360, Microsoft Windows
World War Z	May 30, 2013	iOS, Android

== Digital series ==
Title	Years	Network
The Legion of Extraordinary Dancers	2010–2011	Hulu
The Hotwives	2014–2015	Hulu
Resident Advisors	2015	Hulu
Bajillion Dollar Propertie$	2016–2019	Seeso; Pluto TV
