= Titanic: Adventure Out of Time =

1996 point-and-click adventure game

- Developer: CyberFlix
- Publishers: NA: GTE Entertainment; UK: Europress
- Producer: Andrew Nelson
- Designer: Bob Clouse
- Programmers: Bill Appleton; Todd Appleton
- Writer: Andrew Nelson
- Composer: Erik Holt
- Engine: DreamFactory
- Platforms: Windows, Macintosh
- Release: November 20, 1996
- Genre: Point-and-click adventure
- Mode: Single-player

Titanic: Adventure Out of Time is a 1996 point-and-click adventure game developed by CyberFlix and published in the United States and United Kingdom by GTE Entertainment and Europress respectively, for Windows and Macintosh. It takes place in a virtual representation of the RMS Titanic, following a British spy who has been sent back in time to the night Titanic sank and must complete a previously failed mission to prevent World War I, the Russian Revolution, and World War II from occurring. The gameplay involves exploring the ship and solving puzzles. There are multiple outcomes and endings to the game depending on the player's interactions with characters and use of items.

The game was created with CyberFlix's proprietary engine DreamFactory, which was also used to create Dust: A Tale of the Wired West. Extensive research was done by the development team to ensure historical accuracy and to precisely recreate the ship's interior and exterior 3D environments. As with Dust, Titanic's character animation was done by overlaying multiple still photos of actors to create mouth and facial movements.

With sales above 1.5 million units, Titanic was a commercial success. It received generally positive reviews from gaming critics, who praised the game's story, atmosphere and recreation of the ship, though there was some criticism towards the character animation and some of the puzzles.

== Gameplay ==
Screenshot showing the game's HUD and the Grand Staircase of the Titanic

Titanic: Adventure Out of Time is an adventure game played from a first-person perspective with a point-and-click interface in which players roam a fully rendered model of the RMS Titanic. The game's control scheme is composed of a keyboard, whose arrow keys control the player's movements, and a mouse, with which the player can interact with objects, characters, select dialogue and options from the HUD interface; these are a lifesaver (which brings the player to the options menu), an inventory bag and a pocket watch that indicates the game's progression.

The puzzles in Titanic rely on collecting and using certain items to advance the story. Dialogue is also a significant aspect of the game. Characters are programmed to remember the player's actions and react accordingly, and thus the choice of dialogue options deeply influences the story's progression as to which items the player obtains or the tasks the player is able to complete. As a result, the game can have a total of eight distinct endings, only one of which presents success in the mission. The Titanic herself cannot be saved from her fate under any circumstances.

Time is another important aspect of the game. The story initially does not occur in real time, with time progressing only if certain tasks and puzzles are completed, as indicated by the aforementioned pocket watch; however, as soon as the player reaches the point in which the Titanic is sinking, the game progresses in real time, and the player is thus given a time limit to complete the mission and board a lifeboat. As mentioned above, there are multiple endings for the game's completion, all but one of which result in death.

In addition to the main story, the game also includes a "ship's tour" game mode which features characters in the game narrating certain aspects of the ship, its crew and passengers, and the sinking. These characters can be found in different locations in the ship. Three of the character narrations were already included with the game, while others could be downloaded from CyberFlix's official website.

== Plot ==
On April 14, 1942, Frank Carlson, a former British Secret Service agent, whose career ended in disgrace after he failed a mission on the RMS Titanic, living in his apartment in 9 Stanley Crescent, London, having made a hobby of fixing old watches and clocks, surrounded by mementos of his past, while being threatened with eviction by his landlady, is caught in an air raid of the London Blitz and is sent back in time thirty years to the Titanic on April 14, 1912. Having the opportunity to have a second chance to complete his mission, he meets with his contact, fellow agent Penny Pringle. Carlson's first mission is to locate and retrieve a stolen copy of Omar Khayyam's Rubáiyát, suspected of being in the possession of German Colonel Zeitel, who is traveling to New York to inspect embassies in the United States and Central America, alongside his young protégé Willi Von Haderlitz. Carlson finds that the Colonel has made a deal with art dealer Sasha Barbicon to exchange the Rubáiyát for a painting in which there are hidden war plans stolen from the British government. They both act through a go-between, the Serbian stowaway Vlad Demonic. In addition to the Rubáiyát and the painting, Carlson discovers that Willi is a spy for the Russians and has a notebook with names of top Bolshevik leaders. The notebook must be handed over to the Ochrana so that Communist rebels will be executed, preventing a threat to the Czar. Barbicon is also in possession of a stolen diamond necklace intended to finance the Black Hand, a Serbian military group. Willi is killed by being electrocuted in the electric bath, in the Turkish bath, murdered by Zeitel after realizing that Willi is a spy and is not loyal to Germany.

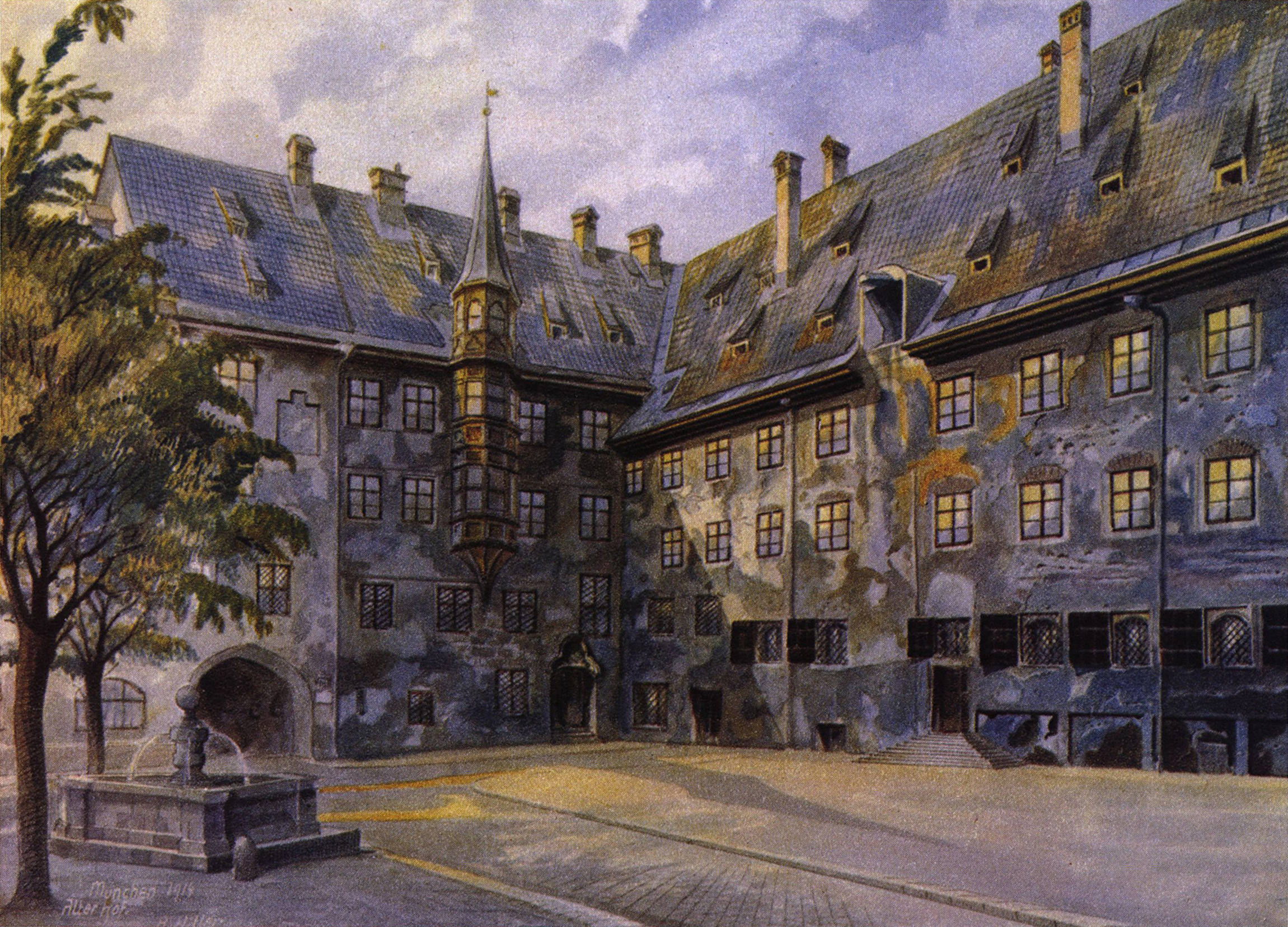
Adolf Hitler's The Courtyard of the Old Residency in Munich appears as a key plot element

The player can also become involved in subplots that do not necessarily pertain to the central mission or the winning conditions of the game. One subplot involves retrieving a business document stolen by steel magnate Andrew Conkling's maid Shailagh Hacker. Other plots involve meeting with passengers such as the Lambeths, a once wealthy couple that perished in the original timeline whose marriage has deteriorated; Lady Georgia Lambeth, a former lover of Carlson; Leyland Sachem Trask, a psychic from Boston who is aware of Carlson's travel from the future; Reverend Edgar Troutt, a Protestant preacher from New Hampshire who is returning from a mission in Nyasaland; and Max Seidelmann, a businessman from Philadelphia. After the ship hits the iceberg and begins sinking, Sasha is killed by Vlad in the Turbine Room for not being loyal to Serbia and the cause of the Black Hand, while Georgia is poisoned by Zeitel and Carlson is offered the choice of trading in the painting to Zeitel for an antidote; after he saves Georgia, he retrieves the painting after he wins the Death card from Buick Riviera in a game of blackjack. The card functions as a ticket to a lifeboat and can be given to a desperate Zeitel to regain the painting after the initial trade.

The number of objects the player obtains before escaping the ship affects the ending and how history plays out. If the player manages to leave the ship with the painting and notebook while ensuring Vlad escapes with neither the diamonds nor the Rubáiyát, history is altered, with World War I, the Russian Revolution, and World War II never occurring.

- Without Vlad providing the necklace or the Rubáiyát, the Black Hand is not financed and their plan to assassinate Archduke Franz Ferdinand of Austria never materializes, preventing World War I.
- If the painting is obtained, it becomes a popular piece because of it surviving the sinking. The painting is revealed to be Adolf Hitler's The Courtyard of the Old Residency in Munich, which causes him to become a famous artist after the painting is retrieved, leading him to devote his life to his art career and averting the rise of the Nazis and World War II. In addition, the secret military deployment plans end up being scrapped.
- If Willi's notebook survives, it's delivered to the Czar and the Bolshevik leaders — Stalin, Lenin, and Trotsky — are executed, and the Russian Revolution never occurs.

In the alternate 1942, Carlson retires after a successful career to a world of peace. Depending on which items the player fails to collect, history will change, but certain wars or revolutions will still occur. The only items required to complete the game successfully, as long as Zeitel and Vlad do not have the other items, are the painting and the notebook. The Rubáiyát and the necklace can go down with the ship and will not affect a successful ending. The player is then given the option of replaying the game again to get the successful ending.

== Production ==
Because you are inhabiting and moving in an artificial environment that is responding to you in real time, you have to really imagine yourself in 1912. Perhaps a better word is "immersed". Our researcher provided us with pictures, photos, images, artifacts, even etiquette books from that era. We bathed in them.

— Andrew Nelson on the creation of Titanic

=== Conception ===
The concept for the game was created by writer and producer Andrew Nelson, who spent ten months working on the game's script, changing the plot and characters in accordance to the needs and demands of the project. He was inspired by a comment his wife Debi Lambert made about video games requiring too much time investment, leading him to pursue a race-against-the-clock game mechanic. Originally, the title was "A Journey out of Time" to reflect this. Nelson pitched the idea to CyberFlix as a "Steam Punk star ship suspended in a vast void", to an enthused audience, and returned with a completed script after writing it over the summer in a New York City loft in Soho.

=== Development ===
CyberFlix's team spent two years researching to ensure the game would be authentic and historically accurate. Apollo 13 screenwriter William Broyles, Jr. served as a historical and photo researcher for the game, collaborating with CyberFlix in finding resources to faithfully re-create the ship and the period the game is set on. Broyles made an extensive use of the Internet and the Library of Congress's online photo department to find historical photos.

Todd Appleton served as lead programmer. The game was developed using CyberFlix's proprietary game engine and software DreamFactory, which was also used by the company to develop Dust: A Tale of the Wired West. The engine allowed the developers to create 3D environments and script the characters so that they retain memory of the player's actions and react differently each time they encounter the player. Wire-frame models of the Titanic, created by the Zygote Media Group in Utah, were textured and polished by graphical artists Michael Kennedy, Alex Tschetter and Paul Haskins. Bob Clouse and Billy Davenport were responsible for the 2D and interface design.

James Cameron contacted the company for the sinking animations. A sequel had been planned set on either the Lusitania or the zeppelin Hindenburg. Hints for both are within the original game, including Carlson having a ticket for the Hindenburg's 1937 voyage in his London flat.

To create Titanic's character animation and movements, the developers cyberscaned multiple still photos of actors and overlaid them on the character's faces to create accurate facial and mouth movements. CyberFlix used the proprietary software HeadShop to combine photography and animation, as opposed to video, for the characters; according to Nelson, the team was not able to use QuickTime for the characters "as video takes up more disk space" and only a few characters could be created. The game's development took nineteen months, with CyberFlix finishing the game in November 1996. GTE Entertainment picked the game for release after Viacom turned it down; it was released on November 20. Due to mention in the game of Adolf Hitler (specifically "The Courtyard of the Old Residency in Munich"), the German version of the game omitted certain references to Nazism in conformant with Germany's censorship laws: "I recall that in the localization efforts, we had to omit references to Hitler. That was a difficulty to achieve as that was a central part of the game. I can't remember which parts were particularly irksome to the German censors, but I do remember we made some complicated maneuvers to fulfill the requests of the censors".

=== Music ===
The soundtrack was composed by Erik Holt, with Scott Scheinbaum serving as musical director. Holt cited as inspirations Igor Stravinsky and Joe Satriani, and also studied composers who were popular in 1912, the game's time period, such as Chopin, Verdi, Rossini, and Mahler, to better evoke both the splendorous and melancholic atmosphere surrounding the Titanic's disaster.

Holt worked for three months on the game's core themes, mixing classical and early 20th-century music with elements of cinematic score. Aside from its original music, the game also features Chopin's Prelude Op. 28 No. 7, which plays on the radio in the opening scene.

== Reception ==
=== Sales and distribution ===
Titanic: Adventure Out of Time sold 43,000 copies in its debut month, and surpassed 100,000 sales by its second, a figure that CyberFlix's Andrew Nelson said made the team "very happy indeed." In January 1997, Variety reported that the game and GTE Entertainment's Timelapse were both "selling well". However, on the 7th of that month, GTE announced its plan to shutter the majority of GTE Entertainment by March, with a final closure set for June. CyberFlix's Erik Quist and Bill Appleton visited GTE Entertainment and pressured the management into signing over the rights to Titanic, as well as providing monetary reimbursement. According to Jack Neely of Metro Pulse, Rand Cabus said that the company "was the only GTE client to get money back from the sinking distributor." Titanic remained on store shelves intermittently; no new copies were printed, and "many locations remained devoid of stock" after selling out, reported GameSpot's Helen Lee. In May, CUC Software signed a deal with CyberFlix to become the new publisher of Titanic, and to print and distribute a second run of the game. By that time, its sales were "approximately" 100,000 copies, Lee noted.

James Cameron's film Titanic debuted in December 1997. While the two products were not directly related, the film's success heavily increased sales of Adventure Out of Time, making it a major commercial hit. Over 200,000 new units of the game were printed and shipped to stores in January and February 1998, and CyberFlix provided $5 rebates in exchange for stubs of Titanic film tickets. It entered PC Data's weekly top 10 for computer game sales during the first half of February; Erica Smith of CNET Gamecenter reported in March, "Local computer software stores say they can't keep enough copies in stock." Stores noted a "diverse" audience for the game, and David Haynes of CyberFlix explained that it drew a high percentage of female players. At the time, Jason Ocampo of Computer Games Strategy Plus remarked that Adventure Out of Time "didn't make that much of a splash the first time out[... but] has managed to hitch a ride on the so-far unsinkable movie."

In the United States, Titanic secured seventh place on PC Data's monthly computer game sales chart for February 1998. It rose to #2 the following month, with an average retail price of $24. The game stayed in PC Data's monthly top 10 from April through July, and returned to #8 in September following a drop to #11 in August. After falling to 20th place in October, it exited the monthly top 20. During the first six months of 1998, Titanic was the United States' fourth-best-selling computer game. It maintained this position in the country's January–November rankings. Finishing 1998 as the United States' sixth-highest computer game seller, again at an average price of $24, it ultimately sold 436,174 copies and earned $10.2 million in revenues in the region for the year. Neely later wrote that Titanic also "broke into the international market, selling well in Britain; the CyberFlix product was eventually translated into seven other languages, including Japanese." By November 1998, Titanic had spent 20 consecutive weeks in the top 10 of Chart-Track's computer game sales rankings for the United Kingdom. It remained in eighth after 25 weeks, peaking at #3, and claimed position 8 for the month of December.

Titanic continued to sell during 1999, and placed 17th for the year overall in the United States, with sales of 269,834 units. Chart-Track ranked the game ninth for January 1999; it was absent from February's chart. By June 1999, Titanic had achieved global sales close to 1 million units. That month, CyberFlix sold the rights to Titanic to the marketing company Barracuda, following Bill Appleton's decision to close the developer. Barracuda continued to support the game, which retained all of its pre-existing publishing and distribution deals under the new arrangement. The game's worldwide sales ultimately surpassed 1.5 million copies by October 2000.

=== Reviews ===
Reception

Review scores
Publication	Score
AllGame	4.5/5
Computer Gaming World	3/5
GameSpot	6.6/10
Next Generation	5/5
The Electric Playground	8.5/10
Just Adventure	B+
Inside Mac Games	4/5
MacHome Journal	5/5
Computer Games Strategy Plus	2.5/5
PC Games	A−
MacAddict	"Spiffy"

Awards
Publication	Award
Inside Mac Games	Adventure Game of the Year
MacHome Journal	Top Game
Computer Game Developers Conference	Best Prerendered Art (finalist)
Computer Game Developers Conference	Best Adventure Game/RPG (finalist)

In a review for Just Adventure, Michal Necasek rated Titanic B+ and praised the game's story and its nonlinearity, as well as the accurate reconstruction of the Titanic, saying that it "greatly adds to the atmosphere of [the game]". He also commended the music and voice acting, but criticized the action sequences. Tony Seideman of Computer Shopper overall praised the game but criticized some of the game's fictional elements and the lacking historical background provided by the Tour guide mode. GameSpot's Tim McDonald rated the game 6.6 /10, praising its re-creation of the ship and the story, but criticizing the long dialogue sequences and the lack of puzzles. The reviewer for Next Generation praised it as "easily one of the best adventure titles of the year".

The editors of MacHome Journal named Titanic the best overall game of the year, and noted its "luscious graphics, great interactivity and repeatable gameplay". It was also declared 1996's best adventure game by Inside Mac Games, whose editors wrote that it "bucked the trend[s] and did something truly unusual." Titanic was nominated by the Computer Game Developers Conference for the "Best Prerendered Art" and "Best Adventure Game/RPG" Spotlight Awards, although these went respectively to Zork Nemesis and The Elder Scrolls II: Daggerfall.

=== Retrospective ===
Reception

Review score
Publication	Score
Adventure Gamers	3.5/5

In 2002, Adventure Gamers' Heidi Fournier rated the game a 3.5/5 and gave high praise to the exploration of the ship and the storyline, calling the subplots "engrossing", but offered minor criticism regarding some of the puzzles, calling them easy, and the characters' movements.

Discussing Titanic in 1998, Dan Bennett of PC Gamer US called it "an average adventure at best." However, in a 2014 retrospective review of the game, PC Gamer's Richard Cobbett praised the game, stating that it is an inspired take on the Titanic story that treats it respectfully "while still spinning off into cool new directions." He compared it to The Last Express, finding similarities between plot elements, gameplay and calling it its "spiritual cousin". In 2017, the magazine's Samuel Horti echoed this praise, calling Titanic "an excellent adventure game".

Adventure Gamers included the game in its list of the Top 100 All-Time Adventure Games, in the 100th position, praising the setting and the timed element as highlights.

== Legacy ==
A full conversion of the game on Java was made available online by Daniel Hobi, and can be played on web browsers. Television documentaries on the Titanic and channels such as Discovery have used scenes from the game because of its faithful recreation of the ship.

In December 2017, a DRM-free version of the game was released via GOG.com, officially making it playable on modern Windows systems.

The creators of Titanic: Honor and Glory have credited the game as an inspiration.
