= World Builder =

1986 video game

- World Builder software icon
- Developer: Silicon Beach Software
- Release: 1986; 40 years ago
- Final release: 1.2 / 1995; 31 years ago
- Operating system: System 3
- Type: Game Creation System
- License: Freeware

World Builder is a game creation system for point-and-click text-and-graphics adventure games. It was released for Macintosh in 1986 by Silicon Beach Software and had already been used for creating Enchanted Scepters in 1984. On August 7, 1995, developer William C. Appleton released World Builder as freeware.

== Functionality ==
World Builder creates games that consist of two windows: a scene window containing a 1-bit black-and-white illustration of the current location; and a text window containing a text description of the current location, a log of any player interactions in this location, and a text parser. The player interacts with the game world by clicking objects in the scene window, typing commands into the text parser, and selecting options from the game's Commands and Weapons menus. World Builder includes an optional combat system that tracks physical and spiritual damage.

The world map is organized into rooms, which World Builder calls scenes, with movement between scenes possible in cardinal directions and up/down as was common in earlier interactive fiction. Other types of movement such as teleportation are possible with scripting. The game engine only supports hostile interactions with NPCs, but scripting can be used for more complex behavior such as peaceful interactions and controlled or random NPC movement. Character combat strength and behavior can be set, as well as the accuracy and strength of native weapons (such as fists and teeth), natural armor and inventory weapons and armor. Combat is turn-based and resolved by the characters' natural attributes modified by armor, weapons and a random component similar to dice rolls in role-playing games.

A large number of games were made and released in circulation, many after the application was made freeware with the release of version 1.2 in 1995. The software did not support 32-bit addressing until version 1.2 and hence games created with prior versions are not compatible with System 7 or later. A ResEdit hack was provided to allow the program (and its games) to run on System 7 to 9 but sounds would not play on Power PC Macs.

Ray Dunakin, author of numerous titles using the game development system, contributed various documentation and supporting files for the World Builder 1.2 release.

=== Interface ===
A screenshot of World Builder editing a game

World Builder's workflow interface consists of four base windows containing the four types of World Builder components that comprise a World Builder game: scenes, characters, objects, and sounds. From these windows, dialog boxes and editing windows can be opened to define the properties of individual components.

- Scene Map: This window contains a scrollable grid map displaying the scenes in the game. Scenes are added as cells in the map. Each cell can be moved around within the map and opened to edit the scene's graphics, text description, data and code.
- Character List: The player character and NPCs have editable data determining attributes such as gender, combat details, sound effects associated with various actions, and comments displayed when the character takes actions. All NPCs are hostile and player interactions are limited to combat, bribery, chasing, and fleeing. Making peaceful NPCs capable of other interactions requires the use of objects and code.
- Object List: These include inventory items and interactive scene objects like doors.
- Sound List: World Builder can import sounds from sound libraries and digitized audio, with each sound effect capped at a maximum size of 65.535 kB.

World Builder includes a graphics editor to illustrate objects, scenes and characters, with support for QuickDraw vector graphics and bitmap raster graphics and the option to paste raster graphics into the editor.

=== Scripting ===
World Builder has a scripting language allowing the user to manipulate the game's components via two layers of code: scene code and global code. World Builder's scripting language allows the user to program global code to define interactions across all scenes, and scene code to define any scene-specific interactions. The scripting language allows tracking and manipulation of the player character, NPCs, objects, player clicks, typed text, predefined numeric variables and user-defined variables via if-then expressions, let expressions, relational operators, and statements.

The World Template included with the program contains default global code with default failure responses to standard text commands like north, south, up, down, and so on. Other than actions with characters (which are always combat oriented) and clicking on objects to pick them up, everything has to set up through code and dialog boxes.

== Reception ==
Gaming historian Richard Moss considered World Builder to be a part of the Macintosh's "for the rest of us" philosophy that democratized home computing with user friendly, accessible tools. World Builder allowed those who weren't skilled coders to develop and modify games with "a few clicks in the authoring tool" and a powerful scripting language. By 1987, World Builder had "spawned a whole breed of games on bulletin boards" ranging "from fairly professional stories to clever, creative efforts by kids and teenagers."

Macworld reviewed World Builder in 1986, praising its ability to create potentially elaborate games by "simply... organizing the pieces the way you want them." The review pointed out several limitations. The simplistic coding language makes implementing advanced features difficult, the lack of a complex text parser in the style of Infocom games limits interactivity, and interacting with other characters is "largely confined to fighting."

The program was reviewed in 1987 in Dragon #118 by Hartley and Patricia Lesser in "The Role of Computers" column. The reviewers stated that "The variety of worlds, scenes, and characters you can create and motivate seems endless... We are really impressed with World Builder." In a subsequent column, the reviewers gave the program 3½ out of 5 stars.

MacUser reviewed World Builder in 1987, awarding it four and a half out of five mice overall and praising it as an "adventure game 'construction set' that can produce commercial quality games with a modicum of effort." In 1989, MacUser selected World Builder as one of the 27 best Macintosh games, saying it "lets anyone with enough imagination design and program a fantasy adventure game."

In 1994, Newsweek cited World Builder, along with Course Builder, SuperCard, and HyperDA, as the reason Appleton was "something of a legend".

== Games ==
- Another Fine Mess
- A Mess o' Trouble
- Bug Hunt
- Canal District
- Double Trouble
- Enchanted Scepters
- Little Pythagoras
- Lost Crystal
- Minitorian
- Midnight Snack
- Mountain of Mayhem
- Psychotic!
- Quest for T-Rex
- Radical Castle
- Castle of Ert
- Ray's Maze
- Star Trek Game
- Sultan's Palace
- The Tower
- Wishing Well

== See also ==
- Adventure Construction Set
- Adventure Game Studio
- MacVenture
