= Creepy Castle (1991 video game) =

1991 video game

- Publisher: Reactor Inc.
- Platform: MacIntosh
- Release: 1991

Creepy Castle is a 1991 video game for the Macintosh published by Reactor Inc.

== Gameplay ==
Creepy Castle is a game in which a fast-paced, black-and-white arcade-style game puts players into a gothic rescue mission across four haunted landscapes: the woods, graveyard, castle, and dungeon. The player is a rugged protagonist on a quest to save a kidnapped village girl from the sinister Dr. Whatever, battling through increasingly perilous environments with only three lives and no continues. Each level presents a trio of challenges: a recurring monster, a flying creature that drops helpful items, and a Boss guarding the path forward. Combat is both hand-to-hand and ranged, with weapons and artifacts scattered throughout each scene to aid survival. Talismans act as screen-clearing, while special powers—earned by defeating monsters in specific ways—are essential for completing the final showdown. In the woods, players face werewolves and ravens; in the graveyard, ghouls and buzzards; in the castle, bats and vampires; and in the dungeon, Frankenstein's Monster and his Bride.

== Reception ==
Derek Pearcy reviewed Creepy Castle for Pyramid magazine and stated that "I have so much fun when I'm playing Creepy Castle, the dull glow from the LCD screen rippling across my face. I think it's serious. Everything's moving so fast -- should I introduce it to my parents? No, it's too soon. I need to play it some more; I think I still have a few things to work out."

Computer Game Review gave the game an overall rating of 85% and said that "No one said life would be simple, but someone has to rescue the poor girl from the Creepy Castle!"

Tim Warner for MacWorld gave the game 2 stars and said that while Reactor had previously "put out some great stuff", he felt that "Creepy Castle's limitations outweigh its merits, and I would not spend my hard-earned dollars on it."
