= Jammit =

1994 basketball video game

- Super NES cover art
- Developer: GTE ImagiTrek Studios
- Publishers: Virgin Interactive Entertainment (Genesis); GTE Entertainment
- Platforms: Genesis, Super NES, 3DO, MS-DOS
- Release: Genesis: NA: May 1994; Super NES: NA: November 1994; 3DO: NA: 1994; MS-DOS: NA: 1994
- Genre: Sports
- Modes: Single-player, multiplayer

Jammit is a video game for the Sega Genesis, Super NES, 3DO, and MS-DOS. It was developed by GTE ImagiTrek Studios and published in 1994.

== Gameplay ==
The game features arcade-styled 1-on-1 street basketball, like NBA Jam or Arch Rivals. Player can choose from three playable characters.

== Reception ==
Quick-Draw McGraw of GamePro reviewed that the 3DO version has better graphics and audio than the earlier Genesis and SNES versions, but not to the extent that one would expect from the far more powerful hardware. He also criticized the jerkiness of the characters' moves, but acknowledged that there were very few street-ball games to offer competition, especially on the 3DO. A reviewer for Next Generation gave it two out of five stars, likewise stating that the 3DO version fails to offer significant enhancement over the versions on less powerful consoles. He added that "in the end though, what kills this one is that the controls are so sluggish you'd think your Nikes had melted to the blacktop".
