= CyberFlix =

Defunct computer game company

CyberFlix Inc.
- Industry: Video games
- Founded: June 28, 1993
- Defunct: November 30, 1998
- Headquarters: Knoxville, Tennessee, U.S.
- Key people: Bill Appleton, Andrew Nelson
- Products: Titanic: Adventure Out of Time; Dust: A Tale of the Wired West
- Website: cyberflix.com (archived)

CyberFlix Incorporated was a computer game company founded in 1992 and it was officially incorporated in 1993 by Bill Appleton. CyberFlix was based in Knoxville, Tennessee. They made many interactive story-telling games in the 1990s, but stopped any and all productions in 1998 before finally going out of business in 2006. The company is a play on two words, cyber and flicks.

In the company's early years, the company had a three-year distribution deal with Paramount Interactive, shortly before Paramount Communications was sold to Viacom.

Two of its best known games were Titanic: Adventure Out of Time and Dust: A Tale of the Wired West. CyberFlix also released the games Skull Cracker, Redjack: Revenge of the Brethren, Power Rangers Zeo vs. the Machine Empire, Lunicus, and Jump Raven.

CyberFlix's founder, Bill Appleton, is famous for his work with the SuperCard development environment and for the early World Builder adventure game production system. He also founded a company called DreamFactory in 1998. DreamFactory kept the trade mark for CyberFlix registered until November 25, 2006.
