= Enchanted Scepters =

1984 video game

- Developer: Silicon Beach Software
- Engine: World Builder
- Platform: Macintosh
- Release: 1984
- Genre: Adventure
- Mode: Single-player

Enchanted Scepters is a point-and-click adventure game released in 1984 for Macintosh. The player must find the four fire, earth, air and water scepters hidden across the Kingdom, and return them to the Wizard. The gameplay is much like a text adventure game. The screen shows a picture of the room the player is currently in and to the right is a description. The description mentions any items that can be used or picked up by the player. The pictures change as the player moves to a new scene. There is no movement in the picture, but enemies are inserted when encountered, accompanied by sound effects. The player can then select from a drop down menu whether to flee, and which way (north, south, east or west and occasionally up or down), or to fight, with a choice of weapon.

Enchanted Scepters was created with the World Builder adventure authoring system which was later released to consumers in 1986.

Opening screen

== Legacy ==
In 1990, a fangame titled Lost Crystal was released that was also developed using the World Builder engine and that took up the plot of Enchanted Scepters.
