= Metro Pulse =

- A cover of Metro Pulse from February 1993 featuring the Knoxville Museum of Art
- Type: Alternative newspaper
- Owner: E.W. Scripps Company
- Founder(s): Ashley Capps, Rand Pearson, Ian Blackburn, and Margaret Weston
- Founded: 1991
- Ceased publication: 2014
- Language: English
- Headquarters: Knoxville, Tennessee
- Sister newspapers: Knoxville News Sentinel
- Website: metropulse.com

Metro Pulse was a weekly newspaper in Knoxville, Tennessee. It was founded in 1991 by Ashley Capps, Rand Pearson, Ian Blackburn, and Margaret Weston, and was a member of the Association of Alternative Newsweeklies.

In 2007, Metro Pulse was sold to the media conglomerate E.W. Scripps Company, which also owns several other local media outlets, including Knoxville's daily newspaper, the Knoxville News Sentinel, and the Shopper News in Halls.

Scripps ceased publication of the newspaper on October 15, 2014. The News Sentinel, Knoxville's daily newspaper, also owned by Scripps, launched a free arts and entertainment supplement in its place. Employees were told not to talk to the media or they would not receive severance. In November 2014, a group of Knoxville journalists announced plans for Hard Knox Independent, a new alternative weekly to launch in January 2015 that aims to fill the niche formerly occupied by Metro Pulse. Meanwhile, the actual editors of Metro Pulse declined to sign their severance agreements, which included a non-compete clause with the News Sentinel. Instead, they announced plans to start their own weekly paper, the Knoxville Mercury, utilizing a Kickstarter campaign and donations collected by a non-profit, the Knoxville History Project, for start-up funding. The Knoxville Mercury was officially launched in March 2015.
