= MacHome Journal =

- Circulation: Montly
- First issue: August 1994
- Language: English

MacHome Journal was a monthly magazine and website based in San Francisco covering the Macintosh platform. Jim Capparell was president of MacHome Journal.

== History ==
MacHome Journal was first launched in August 1994. MacHome Journal offered Mac shareware, updates and demos. In addition it had Short Takes, Mac Home Journal's questionsand-answers section on how to use the various popular Mac software and hardware.

By 1997, MacHome Journal had a circulation of 105,000. The same year the magazine appointed former reviews editor Ed Prasek to the position of editor.

In 1999, MacHome Journal has published an iMac Buyer's Guide, for readers to see a more complete list of "iStuff."
