= Ares (video game) =

1998 video game

- Developer: Nathan Lamont
- Publisher: Ambrosia Software
- Platform: Mac OS
- Release: 1998
- Genre: Strategy
- Modes: Single-player, multiplayer

Ares is a space strategy video game created by Nathan Lamont of Bigger Planet Software, and first released by Changeling Software in 1998. In 1999 the game was re-released as shareware by Ambrosia Software and released as open source software and freeware in 2008. The key feature of the game was its ability to zoom in and out smoothly; this allowed the player to switch between a close-up view, which emphasized space combat skills, and a strategic view of the entire map.

== Story ==
Ishiman vessels defend a newly captured station.

The player is cast as the commander of the U.N.S. Apollo, humankind's first interstellar vessel, dispatched at light speed to investigate the source of a signal broadcast at Earth from one hundred and fifty light years away. On reaching the source, the crew is told that, due to relativistic effects, Earth has by now been taken over by the religious Cantharan Order, and the signal was a ruse from the friendly Ishiman, who wished to maintain humanity as a free race; the Ishiman planned to find a new world for the crew of the Apollo. Although the advanced but peaceful Ishiman are unwilling to enter into direct war with the Cantharans, the Apollo's crew is able to persuade them to supply a limited amount of their technology in an attempt to free Earth. Upon undertaking their new mission, the ship is renamed the Ares.

== Gameplay ==
Ares offers combat situations and strategic planning combined by allowing the player to directly control a single spaceship, at the same time as building and commanding others.

Ares is a saga between six main alien species, with humans being one of the less advanced races in the universe: the Audemedons, the Salrilians, the Ishimans, the Cantharan, the Gaitori and the Humans. There are numerous smaller species which come up throughout the solo play levels, such as the Obish, the Elejeetians, and the Bazidanese. These species are not available for online play.

The single player game consists of a story plot and 21 levels. When released as a shareware game, Ares came with limited functionality and was limited to the first six levels.

In multiplayer, five different game modes are available. Each game has with it a set of absolute strategies to use.

Ares had its own page on the Macintosh Gaming League, organized by Ares supporters. Clans were also found around Ares briefly. One of the oldest and highest ranking clan was called "TAG".

== Development ==
Ares was developed by Nathan Lamont for Classic Mac OS. It also runs natively in OS X Classic environment, available for non-Intel-based Macs.

The game was published by Changeling Software and released in 1998. In 1997, during the game's beta testing, Changeling president Jeanine DeSocio expressed apprehension about how well the game would sell, due to retailer reluctance to stock Macintosh-only games. Changeling became defunct in 1998.

In 1999 the game was re-released as shareware by Ambrosia Software. Ambrosia allowed those who had purchased the original Changeling release to "upgrade" to their version by mailing in $10 and the original game disc. This revision of the game added a level editor named "Hera", which allowed Ares levels to be edited and plugins to be made, similar to the plugins available for Ambrosia software's hit game Escape Velocity.

== Reception ==
Reception

Review scores
Publication	Score
Inside Mac Games	3.5/5
MacHome Journal	4/5

== Legacy ==
In 2008 the Ares source code was released under the GPLv2 software license and most assets under a CC BY-NC Creative commons license by Nathan Lamont. In 2011 a LGPLv3 license option was added. The availability of the source code and assets resulted in continued development by the game's community.
