= Escape Velocity =

Escape speed, often called "escape velocity", is the minimum speed an object without propulsion needs to have to move away indefinitely from the source of the gravity field.

Escape Velocity may also refer to:

== Books ==
- Escape Velocity (Doctor Who), a Doctor Who novel
- Escape Velocity: Cyberculture at the End of the Century, a nonfiction book by Mark Dery
- Escape Velocity, prequel to the Warlock series by Christopher Stasheff

== Video games ==
- Escape Velocity (video game)
  - Escape Velocity Override, its sequel
  - Escape Velocity Nova, the most recent title in the Escape Velocity franchise, along with an expandable card-driven board game based on it

== Music ==
- "Escape Velocity" (song), a 2010 song by The Chemical Brothers
- Escape Velocity, an album by The Phenomenauts

== Film and television ==
- "Escape Velocity" (Battlestar Galactica), an episode of the TV show Battlestar Galactica
- Escape Velocity (film), a 1998 Canadian thriller film
