= Goo ball =

Goo ball may refer to:

- GooBall, a 2005 video game
- Goo ball, a creature of the 2008 video game World of Goo
- Goo balls, a type of cannabis food
