= Museum of Science Fiction =

- Established: April 2013
- Location: Washington, D.C.
- Type: Science Fiction Museum
- Directors: Greg Viggiano, PhD
- Curator: Rachel Frederick
- Website: www.museumofsciencefiction.org

The Museum of Science Fiction (MOSF) is a 501c(3) nonprofit museum that originally had plans to be based in Washington, D.C. It was founded in the spring of 2013 by Greg Viggiano and a team of 22 volunteer professionals with a goal of becoming the world's first comprehensive science fiction museum.

As of 2023, the Museum does not yet have a permanent building or location and is currently developing a virtual reality-based photo-realistic, digital twin of several proposed museum galleries and exhibitions. The Museum is also a frequent collaborator with other organizations, such as the London Science Museum for their 2022 exhibition on science fiction.

Museum of Science Fiction Press
- Publisher: Greg Viggiano, PhD
- Associate Publisher: Mandy Sweeney
- Founded: 2023

== Establishment ==
The Museum of Science Fiction was planning to open a preview museum in late 2015 as a step toward opening the full museum in 2018. The preview museum was envisioned to be a 4,000 square foot multi-purpose location, open for 48 months near a DC Metro station before redeployment as a satellite location that traveled to other global cities to promote the Museum and its mission. This first physical iteration of the preview museum was to feature four gallery change-outs to encourage higher revisit-rates and provide a way for curators to capture early visitor feedback. The interior was expected to also function as a venue for special events including dinners, presentations, film screenings, and lectures with seating for up to 150 attendees.

Despite an Indiegogo crowdfunding campaign not reaching its goal, in July 2014 the Museum hosted an architecture design contest for the Museum's first home, with locations in D.C. and northern Virginia under consideration. In August 2014, the Museum hosted an exhibit design competition seeking exhibits that would have been used in the four-year life of the preview museum.

MOSF Journal of Science Fiction
- Discipline: Science fiction studies
- Language: English
- Edited by: Anthony Boynton II

Publication details
- History: 2016-present
- Publisher: Museum of Science Fiction (United States)
- Frequency: Triannual
- Open access: Yes
- License: Creative Commons Attribution 3.0

Standard abbreviations
- ISO 4: MOSF J. Sci. Fict.

Indexing
- ISSN: 2474-0837
- OCLC no.: 957987943

Links
- Journal homepage; Online access; Online archive

The Museum intends to develop seven permanent galleries that celebrate and encourage the human tendency to always ask, "What if?" The permanent galleries include: The Creators; Other Worlds; Vehicles; Time Travel; Lifeforms; Computers and Robots; and Technology. Science fiction is to be presented as a form of rational speculation that has influenced and been influenced by scientific and technological progress for centuries.

In March 2022, it was announced that work had begun on a VR museum that would provide a photo-realistic virtual reality experience until a physical space is constructed. The first group of galleries are on schedule to open in the fall of 2023.

In September 2022, the Museum received a community education grant from BAE Systems for the design of a quantum computer virtual reality tour to be part of the Computer and Robots Gallery in its VR Museum.

== Publishing ==
=== Landscapes of Dying Worlds: The Art of Michal Klimczak ===
In October 2024, the Museum launched a Kickstarter campaign for an art book entitled "Landscapes of Dying Worlds." The hardcover coffee table book features over 140 pieces of surrealist, post-apocalyptic art and includes augmented reality features on select pages. Polish artist Michał Klimczak, whose work was also featured in the Museum's Ukrainian online exhibition, created all of the artwork. The project was fully funded in November.

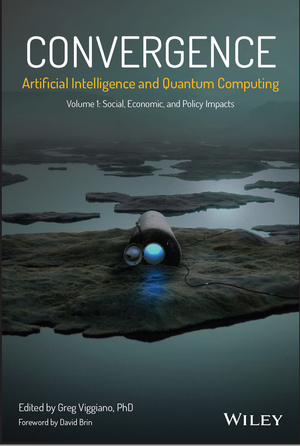
Cover art for the Convergence Vol. 1 book.

=== Convergence: Artificial Intelligence and Quantum Computing: Social, Economic, and Policy Impacts ===
In 2023, the Museum of Science Fiction published a collection of essays on two converging technologies: quantum computing and artificial intelligence. These essays cover how quantum AI may impact our economies, governments, businesses, and ethics as a society. Prominent authors such as Nobel laureate Roald Hoffmann and Hugo and Nebula award-winning author David Brin are featured, as well as a diverse array of experts from industry, academia, and government. Polish artist, Michal Klimczak created the cover art for the book. A second volume will be published in 2024, featuring essays that discuss the application of the aforementioned technologies.

=== Catalysts, Explorers & Secret Keepers: Women of Science Fiction ===
In October 2016, the Museum of Science Fiction launched a Kickstarter campaign to fund its first "take-home exhibit," an anthology entitled Catalysts, Explorers & Secret Keepers: Women of Science Fiction. The campaign was fully funded by November 2016.

The Kindle eBook edition of the anthology was released for general purchase on 14 November 2017, and hardback and paperback editions were released in December 2017.

Julie Dillon created the cover art for Catalysts, Explorers & Secret Keepers. Monica Louzon was the lead on the anthology's editorial team, which also included Jake Weisfeld, Heather McHale, Barbara Jasny, and Rachel Frederick. The anthology includes three new poems by 2017 SFWA Grand Master Jane Yolen and new short stories from Floris M. Kleijne, AJ Lee, Seanan McGuire, Pat Murphy, Sarah Pinsker, and Bonnie Jo Stufflebeam. Reprinted works included in the anthology were written by Eleanor Arnason, Catherine Asaro, Monica Byrne, Betsy Curtis, Kiini Ibura Salaam, N. K. Jemisin, Nancy Kress, Naomi Kritzer, Karen Lord, Anthea Sharp, Carrie Vaughn, and Sarah Zettel.

=== MOSF Journal of Science Fiction ===
The MOSF Journal of Science Fiction is a triannual peer-reviewed open access academic journal covering science fiction studies published by the Museum of Science Fiction from January 2016. The current managing editor is Anthony Boynton II.

According to its editorial policy, the Journal "seeks to uphold the spirit of educated inquiry and speculation through the publication of peer-reviewed, academic articles, essays and book reviews exploring the myriad facets of science fiction." As of April 2023, it has published 14 issues with three to four academic articles per issue.

== Activities ==
=== Ukrainian Online Exhibition ===
In May 2022, the Museum of Science Fiction opened an online digital art exhibition of art in support of Ukraine in its conflict with Russia. The exhibition featured digital artwork by artist Michał Klimczak which could be downloaded for free as a “take home exhibition,” and an exhibition narrative translated into 18 different languages. The Museum launched a successful Kickstarter campaign in Fall 2024 to fund production of an art book of Klimczak's work, titled 'Landscapes of Dying Worlds.'

=== Competitions ===
The Museum of Science Fiction has sponsored several educational competitions since its inception, ranging from artistic exhibitions to engineering projects.

Competition Type	Date Announced
Architectural Design	July 2014
Exhibit Design	August 2014
CubeSat	October 2015
Deep Ocean Robotics	October 2016
Costume Design	September 2017
Prop Replica	October 2018

=== Escape Velocity ===
From July 1 through 3, 2016, the Museum of Science Fiction and NASA hosted its first annual convention called Escape Velocity. Described as a futuristic world's fair to promote STEAM education within the context of science fiction using the fun of comic cons and fascination of science and engineering festivals, the convention featured guests with backgrounds in both science and science fiction such as Rod Roddenberry, Adam Nimoy and Jamie Anderson. A gallery showcasing original replicas of props, models, and costumes from notable works of science fiction offered a preview of the kinds of exhibits which will be on display in the permanent museum.

The CubeSat 2016 award speech at Escape Velocity 2016.

The second annual Escape Velocity was held September 1 through 3, 2017. The theme of the show was Robotics, Computers, AI, and Drones, and guest speakers included Thomas Dolby, Joe Haldeman, and Cas Anvar.

The third Escape Velocity event took place May 25 through 27, 2018. The theme of the show was "Other Worlds", and guest speakers included Greg Nicotero and award-winning author and Museum board member, Greg Bear. The Museum of Science Fiction in cooperation with The Arthur C. Clarke Foundation also celebrated the 50th anniversary of 2001: A Space Odyssey. This celebration featured a special program with a film screening, special guests, and never-before-seen prop reproductions - such as the full size EVA pod.

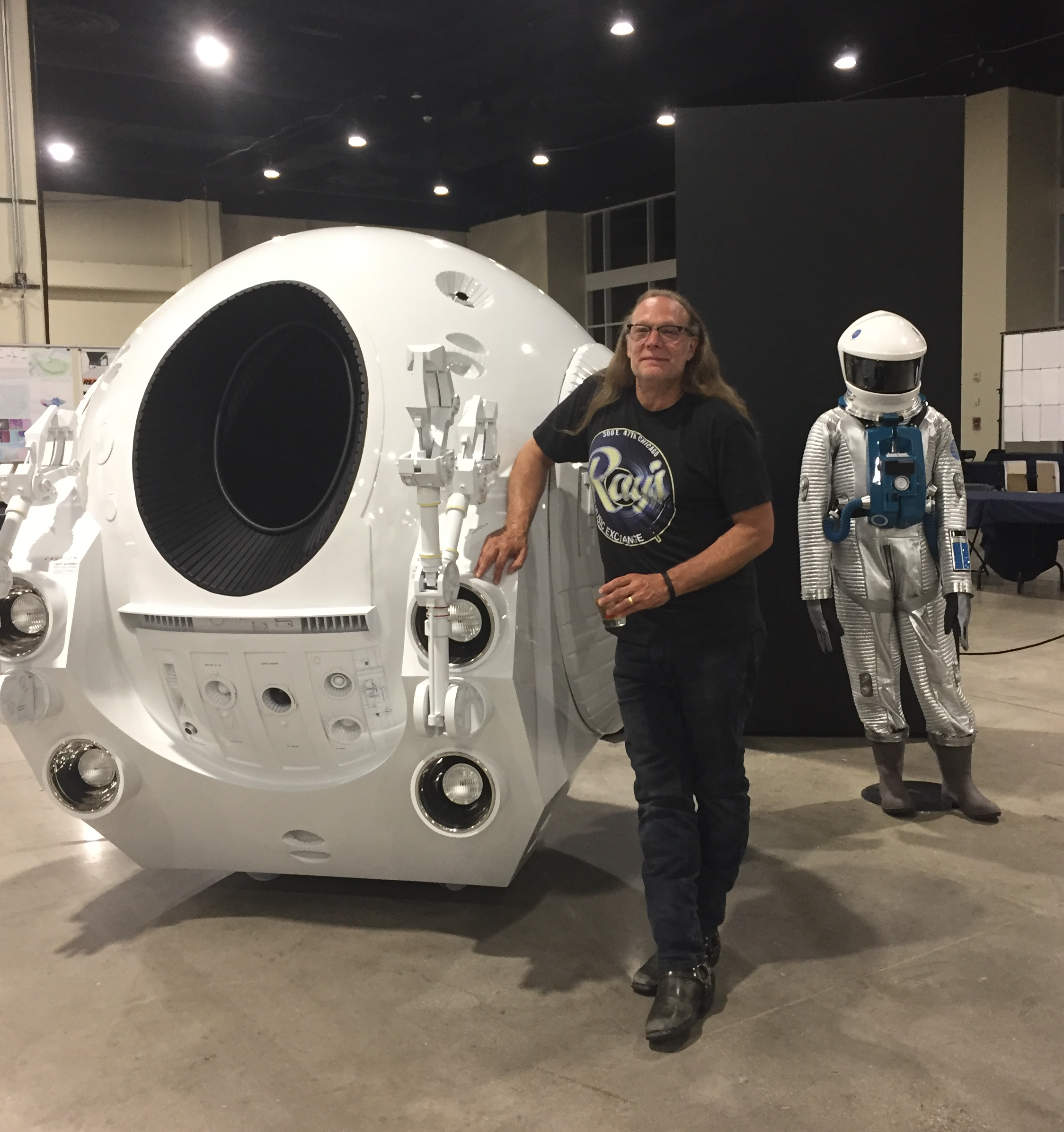
The replica pod from 2001: A Space Odyssey, with Greg Nicotero standing next to it, at Escape Velocity 2018.

Escape Velocity 2019, the fourth iteration hosted the first ever Cosmic Encounter Galactic Championship Tournament as well as the first public reunion of the original three primary Cosmic Encounter designers Peter Olotka, Jack Kittredge and Bill Eberle in many years. Special guests included actresses Dominique Tipper from the Expanse and Gigi Edgley from Farscape.

On July 29, 2020, author of the Martian, Andy Weir led an online panel discussion on the Artemis Mission as part of the Escape Velocity Extra program series, an online-only alternative experience to the annual Escape Velocity convention which could not be held due to the global COVID-19 pandemic.

=== Teacher Development Workshop ===
In May 2016, the Museum of Science Fiction held a Teacher Development Workshop to offer educators new approaches for teaching STEAM courses through the use of science fiction. The workshop was held on Sunday, July 3, 2016 at the Gaylord National Resort and Convention Center as part of the Museum’s first annual Escape Velocity convention. The convention featured appearances by science fiction legacies Rod Roddenberry, Adam Nimoy, and Jamie Anderson who are active supporters of education.

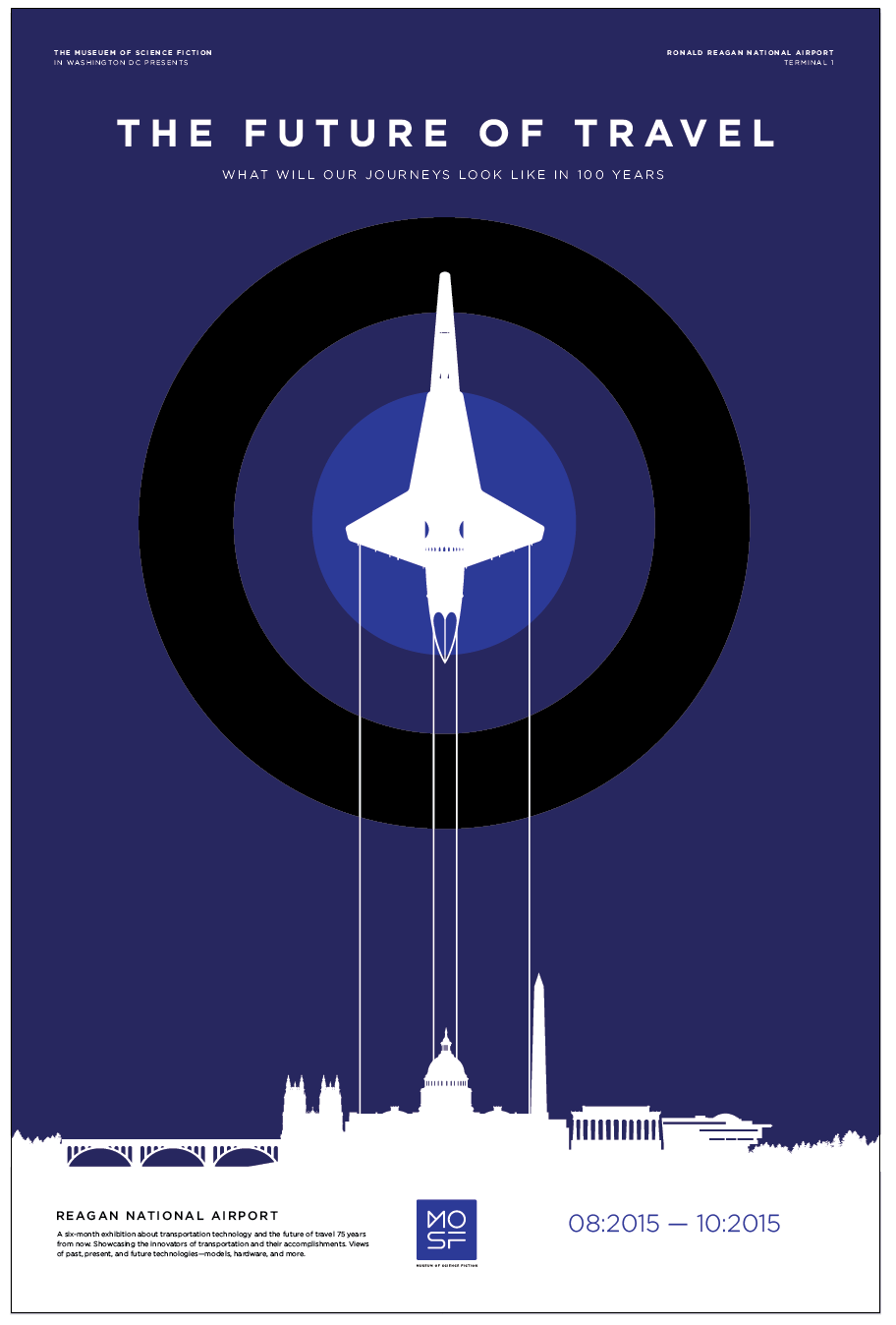
Poster for the Future of Travel exhibit.

=== Future of Travel Exhibit ===
In July 2015, the Museum opened its first public exhibition in the form of the “Future of Travel” gallery. This four-month exhibition in the Ronald Reagan Washington National Airport featured a large-scale model of the Orion III spaceplane from 2001: A Space Odyssey, retro-futuristic travel posters designed by artist Steve Thomas, and a digital companion guide via the Museum mobile app.

=== Mobile App ===
In June 2015, the Museum released a free mobile app for iPhones that featured a science fiction trivia game and guide to the Future of Travel exhibit that it would open the following month.

=== Film Screenings ===
In 2014, the Museum of Science Fiction partnered with the District of Columbia Public Library system to host a monthly science fiction movie screening.

=== Partnerships ===
Beginning in 2014, the Museum started a partnership with the John Eaton Elementary School (Washington, DC) to bring a range of STEAM programs to local school children using science fiction as an educational tool. The Museum worked with educators to develop enrichment experiences and classroom workshops for students. Planned activities include the art of storytelling, writing, illustration techniques, and numerous project-based learning science activities. Additional notable partnerships which have been reported in the Washington Post include the Science Channel and Awesome Con.

In January 2018, the Museum of Science Fiction began a quarterly lecture series in Washington, DC that focused on present day and near future developments in the fields of commercial space travel, artificial intelligence, robotics, and other technology. The first lecture, "AI and Cognitive Computing," took place on February 22 at the offices of K&L Gates, a co-sponsor of the series.

In February 2016, the Museum of Science Fiction co-sponsored a workshop in Los Angeles on the future of human space exploration with the White House Office of Science and Technology Policy (OSTP) and the Science & Entertainment Exchange. “Homesteading in Space — Inspiring the Nation through Science Fiction” brought together stakeholders from academia, government, the commercial space industry, and the entertainment industry to focus on developing a positive, inventive view of future space exploration.

In May 2015, the Museum entered into a Space Act Agreement with NASA which helped to support the launch of the first Escape Velocity convention the following year. In addition to the Space Act Agreement, in 2016 the Museum of Science Fiction joined the NASA Heliophysics Education Consortium at the Goddard Space Flight Center and received a $200,000 5-year grant through a NASA Cooperative Agreement. During this time, NASA and the Museum prototyped a VR environment of a 4,000 square-foot museum space that allowed visitors to interact with exhibits and operate a heliophysics science station that offers an unprecedented view of the sun. The solar data provided by NASA satellites ensured that visitors experienced the most realistic and scientifically accurate presentation of the heliosphere and solar weather. "We are always looking for disruptive innovations on better storytelling," said Bryan Stephenson, a VR developer at NASA's Goddard Space Flight Center working on the project. "New virtual reality technologies, like the Oculus Rift, will bring about a revolution in education and entertainment that will completely change how we experience digital realms. We are delighted to begin exploring how we may deliver this new content with the Museum of Science Fiction." The VR Museum was later incorporated into NASA's STEM Innovation Lab.

In spring of 2015, the Museum partnered with the costume production MFA program at the University of North Carolina at Chapel Hill to create screen-accurate costume replicas for display of iconic costumes from science fiction films. These costumes are displayed at the Escape Velocity convention and are part of the museum's permanent collection. The graduate students create the replicas under the supervision of the program faculty and with the assistance of undergraduate costume lab students. Examples of costumes created are the spaceflight attendant from 2001: A Space Odyssey, Neo's costume in the first Matrix film, the Stillsuit from the original Dune film, a Borg unit from Star Trek, and the Frankenstein creature from classic horror iconography.

The Museum of Science Fiction has also hosted a monthly science fiction movie screening in conjunction with the District of Columbia Public Library System.
