= Avarus =

Avarus (masculine) or Avara (feminine) is a Latin adjective meaning "greedy, covetous" and may refer to:

- Avara, a 1996 computer action game made by Ambrosia Software for the Apple Macintosh
- Avarus (Finnish band), a psych folk band from Tampere, Finland

For the Roman term for a northern cape in Portugal, see Cape Santo André.
