= Mars Rising =

1998 video game

- Developer: Ambrosia Software
- Publisher: Ambrosia Software
- Designer: David Wareing
- Programmer: David Wareing
- Platform: Mac OS
- Release: NA: January, 12 1998
- Genre: Scrolling shooter
- Mode: Single-player

Mars Rising is a vertically scrolling shooter written by David Wareing and released as shareware by Ambrosia Software for Macintosh computers in 1998. Reviewers called out similarities to Xevious and Raiden. It was followed by Deimos Rising in 2001.

== Reception ==
Mars Rising

Review scores
Publication	Score
Macworld	4/5
MacHome	3.5/5

== Legacy ==
The 2001 sequel, Deimos Rising, adds 16-bit color, alpha transparency, motion blur, improved artwork and a wider range of enemies and weapons. It was ported to Microsoft Windows.

Deimos Rising

Review scores
Publication	Score
Macworld	4/5
MacGamer	90%
Inside Mac Games	8/10
Applelinks	4/5
MacHome	3/5
