= The Adventures of El Ballo =

2005 video game

- Software icon for The Adventures of El Ballo
- Developer: ProRattaFactor
- Publisher: Ambrosia Software
- Platforms: Mac OS, Mac OS X
- Release: September 19, 2005
- Genre: Platform
- Mode: Single-player

The Adventures of El Ballo is a 2D side-scrolling platform game for Mac OS 9 and X released by Ambrosia Software on September 19, 2005. It focuses on blatant, crude humor and mild animated nudity and includes parental controls to disable some content. The game was poorly received by Macintosh publications. It costed 25 dollars on release.

== Gameplay ==
The gameplay was similar to Mega Man, with Ars Technica describing it as a retro sidescrolling shooter.

== Plot ==
The game takes place on the planet Testicular which is located in the "Circular Assmosphere" solar system. Testicular is populated by an unsanitary but peace-loving and playful alien race. The evil Dr. Cough is out to cleanse the planet Testicular and to make the inhabitants give up their love of nakedness in favor of being clothed. El Ballo, one of the aliens who lives on Testicular with such companions as "Butts" and "Boobs", must take on the Chlorine Copters, Mic the Mop, and other henchmen of Dr. Cough before heading to the castle where El Ballo must deal with the evil doctor.

== Reception ==
In MacWorld, Peter Cohen complimented the game's art and music but felt that the gameplay itself lacked fun. Inside Mac Games gave El Ballo a 3.75 out of 10 rating, stating that the gameplay was unexciting though the game's plot was unique. The reviewer commented, "It is possible to complete about 90% of the game by simply holding down one of the directional keys and constantly jumping or firing until you reach the end." Also mentioned was the issue of the game's adult theme posing concerns for parents and that the game's parental control feature was easy to bypass. MacLife gave it a more positive review at 3/5, citing its funny nature but criticizing its high cost.
