= Pillars of Garendall =

2001 video game

- Developer: Beenox Studios
- Publisher: Ambrosia Software
- Composer: Mathieu Lavoie
- Platforms: Mac OS Classic; Microsoft Windows; Mac OS X
- Release: NA: August 27, 2001
- Genre: Role-playing

Pillars of Garendall is a role-playing video game that was built by Beenox Studios and Ambrosia Software. It was built using the Coldstone game engine, which was also a joint Beenox/Ambrosia project. The game was released in 2001 for Mac OS Classic, Microsoft Windows and Mac OS X.

Due to problems with the Coldstone game engine, which renders Pillars of Garendall unplayable on recent versions of the Mac OS X platform, Ambrosia Software stopped selling licenses for the full game and as of December 2008, the Coldstone game engine has been indicated as being "discontinued" with regard to the latest version information on the Ambrosia Software website. The new management of Beenox is uninterested in fixing these problems with the game engine. Ambrosia Software has stated that they want to fix the Coldstone software, but that they never would have agreed to distribute the project if they had known they would have to provide updates and bug fixes.

== Description ==
In the game, the capital city of the kingdom of Garendall, Gidolan Keep, is being attacked by monsters, and the player must train to eventually defeat them. Demos of the game were made available for the Mac OS platform, the Mac OS X platform and the Windows platform.

Among other things, the game-making capabilities of the Coldstone game engine software were confirmed by the building of the PoG game. Inside Mac Games gave Pillars of Garendall a 7.75 out of 10 rating, noting the game's detail and elaborateness with such things as 2D sprites in a 3D environment even though the game premise was unoriginal.

== Engine ==
The Coldstone game creation software is designed to provide a full solution for creating role-playing or adventure-style games. Although the Coldstone software itself only runs on the Mac OS platform, it is capable of compiling stand-alone games that run on the Mac OS 9 platform, the Mac OS X platform, or the Windows platform. The full version of Coldstone shipped with a CD of royalty free artwork for use in one's custom games.
