= ShadowWraith =

1995 video game

- Developer: Terminal Sunset
- Publisher: StarPlay
- Designer: Ravi Mehta
- Platform: Macintosh
- Release: 1995
- Genre: Scrolling shooter
- Mode: Single-player

ShadowWraith is a top-down view scrolling shooter video game created by American studio Terminal Sunset for the Macintosh, and published by StarPlay. The game has a sequel called Souls in the System.

As of December 2002, the StarPlay online product catalog indicated that the company was no longer selling games directly.

== Story ==
In the game, the player assumes the role of an artificial intelligence representation of a man named Alex Kendall, who was assassinated for having associations with the Defense Department. Before his annihilation, Kendall's work in the Defense Department had grown unsatisfying for him, and so he instead devoted his time and efforts to the expansion of the ever growing cyberspace. In his latest project, he had created a way of designing a person's ego into the net, with such a cybernetic ego incorporating personality and intelligence in addition to tactile senses, using his own as a prototype. His attempt at doing so was a success, though Kendall never got a chance to reveal his findings to the world, as he was killed shortly after, awaking to see his family die at the hands of his murderers. Soon afterwards, Kendall's mind came to life again in the form of a cyberspace program.

Throughout the game, the player controls Alex Kendall's cyberspace program of himself, seeking revenge of his family, and his own mortal self. The phrase "Revenge is best served on the Net" is shown in the opening titles before game play commences.

== Soundtrack ==
The soundtrack was composed by Steven Allen, Andrew Schlesinger, Volker Tripp, and Thomas Chenhall, with the songs being stored in MOD format. It consisted of the following song titles in alleged order of game play:

1. Extend
2. Into the Shadow
3. Haunt
4. Night
5. Cyberride
6. Fall
7. Wraith
8. Marshins
9. Dance of Zax
10. Overlord
11. World
12. Ryu
13. Stardust (Memories)
14. Oblivion
15. Silntrac (Silent Racer)
16. Elysium
17. Molecule (Molecule's Revenge)
18. DENSETSU
19. Pulse
20. Off Line Pulse
21. Dance Factory
22. Internal Impactor
23. Evergladez
24. Space
25. Xenon

== Reception ==
Inside Mac Games complimented the game on its detailed physics model and music, among other things, and commented that ShadowWraith was better than the other games in its genre, though there were slight difficulties with switching weapons during gameplay and slower performance on 68030-based Macs.

== Sequel ==
Souls in the System is a sequel to ShadowWraith, released in 1996 for the Macintosh. It included multiplayer modes. It was designed and developed by Ravi J.K. Mehta of Terminal Sunset Software. The cover illustration was designed by Peter Bollinger and came with the CD containing the program and music files.
