= Deathground =

1999 video game

- Developer: Freeverse Inc.
- Platform: Mac OS
- Release: August 23, 1999

Deathground is a 1999 video game from US developer Freeverse.

== Gameplay ==
In Deathground, players step into the role of mob bosses vying for control over New York City's boroughs, each neighborhood a battleground in a stylized turf war. The game involves gritty urban domination with tommy gun-toting gangsters vying over districts. Up to six players—human or AI—take turns at the keyboard, since network play is not supported. The core strategy is straightforward: expand your territory, reinforce your strongholds, and overwhelm adjacent enemies. Success hinges on tactical troop placement, calculated assaults, and end-of-turn fortifications. Bonuses are awarded based on territorial size, encouraging aggressive expansion while defending key access points to your criminal empire. The game includes several strategic components: occupying zones with police stations or hospitals yields special perks, and seizing areas marked "Deathground" can trigger chaotic, game-changing events. The aerial map offers a broad view of contested zones. Deathground offers a "Demand Surrender" option to shorten drawn-out campaigns, voiceover gunfight commentary, and an intuitive interface.

== Development ==
The game was showcased at the 2000 Macworld Expo.

== Reception ==
Reception

Review scores
Publication	Score
Inside Mac Games	4/5
MacWorld	4/5

MacAddict said "Deathground is a slick little strategy game that will interest teenagers and adults alike, but only when players are competing against human opponents"

The game was awarded best traditional game in MacWorld's 1999 Game Hall of Fame.
