= Aphelion (disambiguation) =

An aphelion is the furthest point of an orbit around the Sun.

Aphelion may also refer to:

== Music ==
- Aphelion (Edenbridge album), 2003
- Aphelion (Dave Rempis album), 2014
- Aphelion (Leprous album), 2021
- Aphelion, 2014 electronic music single by the American group Scandroid

== Other uses ==
- Aphelion (software), a software suite for image processing and analysis
- Aphelion, 2007 novel by Australian writer Emily Ballou
- Aphelion (video game), 2026

== See also ==
- Apeiron (disambiguation)
