= Redline (2006 video game) =

- Developers: Jonas Echterhoff and Ambrosia Software
- Publisher: Ambrosia Software
- Designer: Jonas Echterhoff
- Platform: Mac OS X
- Release: 2006-09-21
- Genre: Sim racing
- Modes: Single-player, multiplayer

Redline is a video game for Mac OS X developed by Jonas Echterhoff and published by Ambrosia Software. The game's primary features are its ability to simulate actual racing physics, online play, and support for the addition of third party content via plug-ins. The combination of these features have attracted numerous players and led to the creation of a seasonal racing league. Redline also has several modes of gameplay for those who prefer arcade style physics commonly found in other racing games. The game is now currently obsolete and an error message will be displayed upon opening the application as of OS X Snow Leopard and above. However, a fan-made patch allows the game to run on OS X Mavericks and above, but in single-player modes only.

== Gameplay ==
Players may race in one of four modes: Time Trial, Quick Race, Challenge, or Multiplayer. In all of these modes, except for Challenge, the player may choose the track, their car, the weather, forward or reverse orientation, and the physics mode to race under. The modes available are: Simulation, Strict, Arcade, and Turbo Arcade. In Simulation, every car handles differently based on weight, drivetrain, horsepower, suspension setup, and other variables. Strict is a derivative of the Simulation mode, that was added in a later update that adjusts how car-scenery collisions are handled to help reduce the effectiveness of the "wall riding" technique. Arcade sacrifices realism for playability. Cars in Arcade differ less in performance than they do in Simulation or Strict. Turbo Arcade has the same physics as Arcade, but all cars much faster than normal, resulting in the least realistic method of play.

Screenshot of Redline's gameplay

The main modes of gameplay are Quick Race and Multiplayer, the former a single player race between the player and up to eleven Artificial intelligence opponents, the latter a race of up to twelve human or A.I. racers over the internet. The host of the game chooses the track, weather, physics mode, and number of laps to be raced. Any cars a player has unlocked in the Challenge mode can be used, even if other players in the game have not unlocked them. However, if the host chooses, they can force all players to use the same car. Additionally, only plug-in cars and tracks that are had by all players may be used. If a player chooses a car or track which other players do not have, an error message is displayed and the race can not be started.

In the Time Trial mode, the player attempts to get the fastest lap time possible. They are able to compete locally on the host machine with stored scores and worldwide via an online time tracker. Times are submitted to the time tracker when a lap is completed and the rank, if any, of the time is returned. To simulate a rolling start, the player is placed some distance away from the starting line, allowing them to begin the first lap at the same speed as a normal race lap (versus Redline's usual standing start).

Challenge mode presents the player with specific car and track combinations, and a set of rules for completion. Some challenges require getting from start to finish under a certain time limit, and others call for avoiding obstacles that will disqualify the player if they are touched. Players are graded by how fast they complete the challenges with bronze, silver, or gold medals. Fast completion times can unlock new cars for use in any of the other modes. Additionally, like Time Trial, the player can compete for best times locally and worldwide.

== Redline Racing League ==
The Redline Racing League (RRL) is a multi-race Simulation tournament (the Summer 2007 season was 20 races) held over the course of about 3 months. Three seasons of RRL have been held so far, and the last one, in the summer of 2007, attracted more than 30 racers from all over the globe.

== Third party content ==
Several user-made cars racing on a user-made track.

Redline has a now-inactive community of dedicated third party developers who once constantly released new cars, tracks, weather settings, challenges, and other plug-ins for the game. As of February 24, 2011, there are over 450 cars and tracks available for download.

== Reception ==
Reception

Review scores
Publication	Score
Macworld	3.5/5
Inside Mac Games	8/10

Redline has received positive reviews from critics, including an 8/10 from Inside Mac Games. The game was praised for its accurate simulation of realistic physics as well as including arcade style physics. Macworld noted its multiple game modes, open architecture, and multiplayer, among other things. Many reviewers stated that, "the graphics, while certainly not PGR3 or Gran Turismo 4 quality, are completely adequate" and "allow Redline to run on almost any Mac." However, reviewers almost universally disliked the lack of a damage model in the simulation mode. ATPM stated that the controls, when played with a keyboard, felt like the driver was slamming the pedals and suddenly jerking the wheel.
