= Endless Sky =

2015 video game

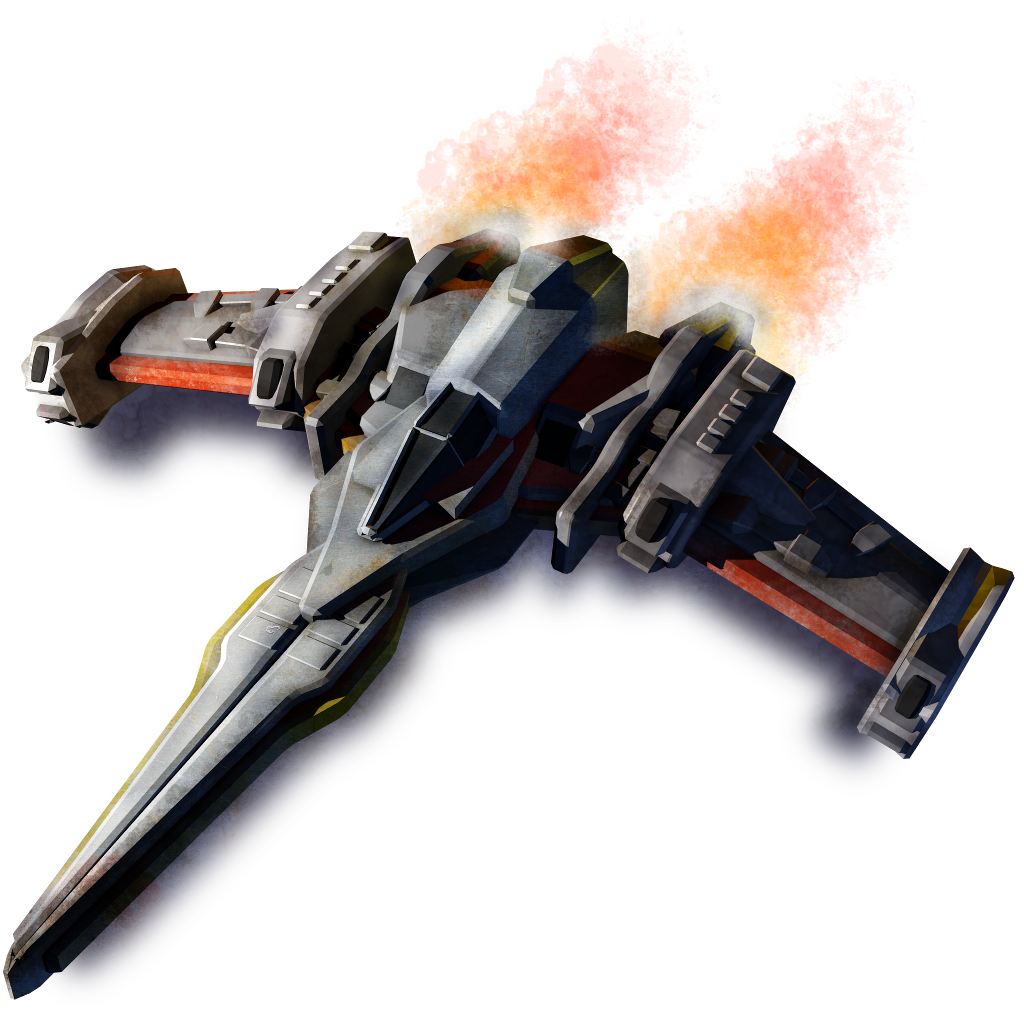

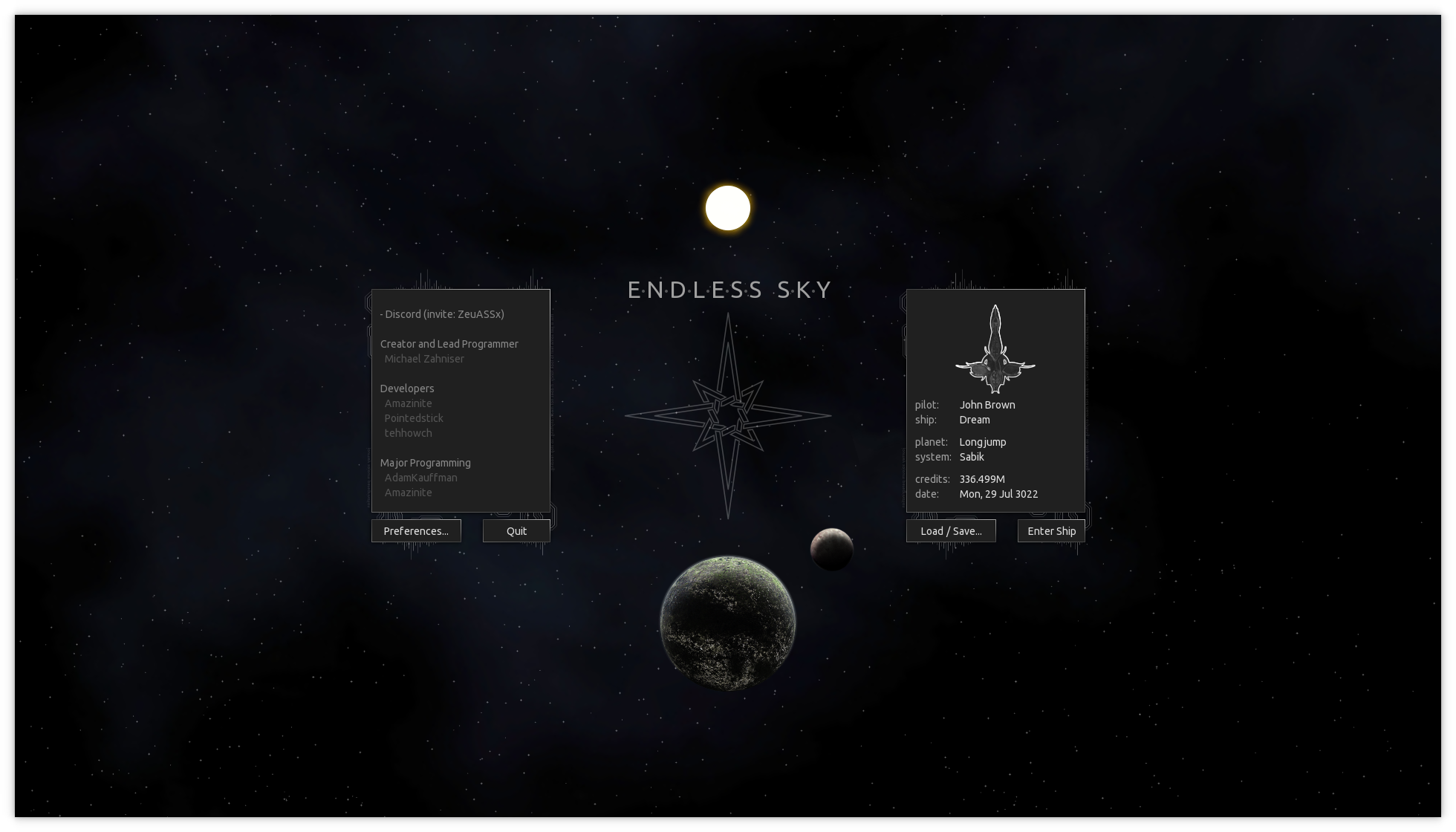
- Title screen from version 0.9.12
- Original authors: Michael Zahniser and others
- Release: July 22, 2015; 11 years ago
- Stable release: 0.11.4 / October 31, 2026; 0 days ago
- Written in: C++
- Platform: Windows, macOS, Linux
- Available in: English
- Type: Single-player, space trading and combat simulator
- License: GPLv3
- Website: endless-sky.github.io
- Repository: github.com/endless-sky/endless-sky

Endless Sky is a space trading and combat simulation video game, created by Michael Zahniser and first released in June 2015. In Endless Sky, the player starts out as a spaceship captain and can trade, transport passengers or fight pirates to earn money. There are also a few story lines that the player can choose to participate in. The game is similar to games in the Escape Velocity series.

Endless Sky is free software, available under the GPLv3 license in source form and for a variety of operating systems.

== Gameplay ==
Endless Sky is a space trading and combat simulation game. The gameplay is similar to that of Escape Velocity: Nova. The game is played from a top-down perspective in 2D. The player starts the game as a captain of a spaceship. There are various ways to earn money in the game, some of which are: trading commodities, delivering cargo, transporting passengers and stealing from other ships. Player can purchase spaceships, outfits and commodities when landed on planets. Various aspects of ships can also be modified, including engines, weapons, shield generators and other outfits. There are several different story lines involving different human and alien factions.

The stable version of Endless Sky currently comes with one human and one incomplete alien campaign, as well as many shorter mission chains.

It is possible to create and distribute additional content, such as alien species, campaigns and map additions, via add-ons officially known as plugins. Plugins currently need to be installed and updated by manually downloading the plugin's files and placing them in the appropriate directory, and can be removed by deleting these files. There is also an unofficial application which can manage plugins automatically.

It is also possible (and encouraged) to contribute new features or content to the game via the Endless Sky GitHub repository.

== Setting ==
Endless Sky takes place in the Milky Way galaxy. Various star systems are connected by hyperspace links which allow the ships to travel between the star systems, although it is possible to travel between star systems not joined by a hyperspace link with an outfit that is difficult to obtain. There are various human and alien factions in the game that may be friendly or hostile towards other factions and the player.

Endless Sky currently has 18 factions. Each faction controls a region of space, and each race can be split into several different factions. In addition, there are also four factions that are known to have gone extinct at the time of gameplay. The exact spaceships used by the factions, and the territory controlled by them, change during the course of the various campaigns.

== Development ==
The game is programmed in C++. OpenGL is used to render the game. It is cross-platform, runs on macOS, Windows, and Linux, and has an unofficial port to Android. Over 300 contributors have contributed code and content to the game.

Endless Sky releases can be downloaded in stand-alone binary form and also from the GOG and Steam digital game stores.

== Reception ==
Reception

Review score
Publication	Score
Softpedia	3.5/5 stars

Upon the game's Steam Greenlight campaign, Adam Smith of Rock Paper Shotgun called Endless Sky "caught somewhere between the 4X majesty of Endless Space and the interstellar tourism of No Man's Sky", describing it as "like catnip to me". In his impressions upon the game's successful Steam release, he noted that the most impressive part of the game was the reactive nature of AI vessels, also noting the dynamic nature of the galaxy. Calling it a "special game", he relayed his belief that "I think Space Rangers 2 has finally been replaced".

Alexandru Chirila of Softpedia said that the game was casual and easy to pick up, but had a lot to offer, noting the amount of missions on each inhabited planet. While he stated that the graphics did not "look fantastic", he nevertheless noted that it "held its own". Linux Voice called the game "a great deal of fun", saying that, despite its top-down view, it "still looks great", and calling it "ideal for younger people" due to its trading simulation gameplay. Gameplay Magazine called it one of the best free games in a long time, describing it as both impressive and well-presented. It was also noted as one of the best open source video games by The Gamer.

== See also ==
- List of free and open-source software packages
- List of open source games
