= 3030 Deathwar =

2007 video game

- Box art with main character John Falcon third from left
- Developer: Bird in Sky
- Publisher: Crunchy Leaf Games
- Platform: Windows
- Release: 2007: Original; 2014: Re-release; 2017: Redux
- Genre: Space trading and combat simulator
- Mode: Single-player

3030 Deathwar is an open world action-adventure game by British developers Matt Griffiths and Mic Newsam as Bird in Sky. The game was mostly known for the Redux version, released by Crunchy Leaf Games and Bird in Sky on Steam in 2017.

== Plot ==
The game opens in the year 3029, with humanity and some friendly alien species having just barely survived the onslaught of mysterious nano-machines, known only as the "Cleaners". These machines have made planets completely uninhabitable and so forced the survivors to live on ships and stations spread across space.

The player takes the role of John Falcon, a rogueish space adventurer, who just wants to make ends meet. Over the course of the game, the player joins the Taoists, an organization aiming to bring down the Cleaners and uncover the conspiracy behind them.

== Gameplay ==
Similar to games like Escape Velocity, Elite, and Wing Commander: Privateer, the game involves 2D open world exploration of star systems, trading and combat, from a top-down perspective. Player can choose freely when and where to travel. Some of the activities the player can partake in are trading, hunting pirates, searching for derelicts and wormholes and taking on various missions, ranging from cargo delivery to planet photography.

Over the course of the game, once the player has earned enough money, he is able to buy new ships, of various types such as: trader, interceptor and allrounder. He can then equip it with weapons such as guns and missiles and buy additional upgrades of a large variety, such as different types of scanners, tractor beams, shields, thrusters, a fuel scoop and an afterburner.

The player can board stations and walk around on them in a visual style similar to adventure games of the '90s like Indiana Jones and the Fate of Atlantis. Some of the possible actions are talking to characters on the station, trading, upgrading and taking missions. Besides the randomly generated side-missions there is also a main plot, split into 10 acts that the player can progress through.

Players are required to board space stations and talk to characters to complete missions and advance the main plot, where the perspective switches to side-scrolling. The game has a comedic tone and graphical style reminiscent of early 1990s LucasArts adventure games.

== Production ==
The game was originally developed and released by Matt Griffiths and Mic Newsam as Bird in Sky in 2007. In 2014 game developer Max Dohme joined Matt Griffiths in creating an updated release for the game. They teamed up after Max had created a number of mods for the game and had gotten in touch with Matt about creating an updated version. The new version was launched on October 15, 2014, with Crunchy Leaf Games acting as the publisher for this re-release.

== Redux Version ==
In September 2017 Crunchy Leaf Games and Bird in Sky released the Redux Version of 3030 Deathwar on Steam. This version adds an extended adventure, extra characters and side quests, space races, graphical enhancements, balancing and gameplay changes, a polished tutorial and many minor improvements.
