= GooBall =

2005 video game

- Developer: Over the Edge
- Publisher: Ambrosia Software
- Engine: Unity
- Platform: Mac OS X
- Release: March 2005
- Genre: Puzzle
- Mode: Single-player

GooBall is a 2005 puzzle video game developed by Over the Edge and published by Ambrosia Software for Mac OS X. It is Over The Edge's first game, and runs on an early beta version of the Unity engine, which it was meant to showcase. The game was commercially unsuccessful, leading Over The Edge to change its focus from making games, to making the Unity engine.

== Gameplay ==
The player assumes the role of an alien stranded on Earth. "Goober", as the alien becomes known to the CIA, is stuck inside a life support device made of protoplasm. The gameplay is similar to the Super Monkey Ball series in that the player tilts the environment, which causes Goober to roll around in it, collecting gems and making its way to the end gate within the imparted time. Goober can stick to surfaces by holding down the command key; this ability can be used to climb walls, or to avoid falling off from ledges. Jumping while in sticky mode launches Goober away from the wall, which players can use to reach the end of more advanced levels.

== Reception ==
GooBall

Review scores
Publication	Score
Macworld	4/5
Inside Mac Games	8.5/10

Inside Mac Games writer Mark Satterthwaite praised the game's level design, sound effects, and especially its graphics, saying that the game "offers lighting and shader and particle effects more commonly seen in top-of-the-line shooters like Doom 3". He said that "smooth sand and rippling water [...] looks better than anything in Halo or Doom 3", and called it "one of the few truly [graphically] impressive" Mac games at the time. However, he criticized GooBall's camera orientation, and its lack of gamepad support.

Apple games reviewer Brad Cook compared GooBall to Robert A. Heinlein's Stranger in a Strange Land.

In an October 2005 interview, Over the Edge CEO David Helgason called GooBall a "perfect showcase for Unity". Despite high downloads, the game was not a commercial success, leading Over the Edge to change its focus to engine development.
