= Ambrosia Software =

Defunct American software company

- Type: Private
- Industry: Software, video games
- Founded: August 18, 1993; 33 years ago
- Defunct: July 19, 2019; 7 years ago
- Headquarters: Rochester, New York, U.S.
- Key people: Andrew Welch; Dominic Feira
- Products: Shareware video games and utilities

Ambrosia Software was a predominantly Macintosh software and gaming company founded in 1993 and located in Rochester, New York, U.S. Ambrosia Software was best known for its Macintosh remakes of older arcade games, which began with a 1992 version of Atari, Inc.'s Asteroids from 1979. The company also published utility software. Its products were distributed as shareware; demo versions could be downloaded and used for up to 30 days. Later the company released some products for iOS. Ambrosia's best-selling program was the utility Snapz Pro X, according to a 2002 interview with company president Andrew Welch.

In 2017, customers reported on Ambrosia's Facebook page that attempts to contact the company were unsuccessful and they were unable to make new purchases. As of July 2019, the website is offline. As of May 2021, the website resolves but leads to a domain parking page with ads unconnected to the company.

== History ==
The first game distributed under the Ambrosia Software name was Maelstrom, a 1992 remake of the 1979 Asteroids arcade video game. It uses raster graphics similar in style to Atari's later Blasteroids (1987) and the Atari ST game Megaroids (1988). Despite the concept being 13 years old at the time of release, Maelstrom was popular at a time when Macintosh action games were in short supply, and it won some software awards.

Ambrosia Software was incorporated August 18, 1993, by Andrew Welch after he graduated from the Rochester Institute of Technology in 1992. Maelstrom was followed by more action games, including Apeiron (a remake of Centipede), Swoop (a clone of Galaxian), and Barrack (a clone of JezzBall). In 1999, Cameron Crotty of Macworld wrote that "No other company has gotten so much mileage out of renovating mid-1980s arcade hits."

Nearly all of the company's ten employees were laid off in 2013, but Welch denied rumors of the company closing. In late 2018, the company's last remaining employee announced that Ambrosia was officially shutting down operations.

== Products ==
=== Games ===
Ambrosia Software's games, in order of release:

Games published by Ambrosia Software
Year	Game	Author	Platform
1992	Maelstrom (Note: Compare to Asteroids)	Andrew Welch	Classic Mac OS
1994	Chiral (Note: Compare to Atomino)	Trevor Powell, Andrew Welch	Classic Mac OS
1995	Apeiron (Note: Compare to Centipede)	Andrew Welch	Classic Mac OS
1995	Swoop (Note: Compare to Galaxian)	David Wareing	Classic Mac OS
1996	Barrack (Note: Compare to Jezzball)	Greg Lovette	Classic Mac OS
1996	Escape Velocity	Matt Burch	Classic Mac OS
1996	Avara	Juri Munkki	Classic Mac OS
1996	Bubble Trouble	Alex Metcalf, David Wareing	Classic Mac OS
1997	Harry the Handsome Executive	Ben Spees	Classic Mac OS
1998	Mars Rising	David Wareing	Classic Mac OS
1998	Escape Velocity Override	Matt Burch, Peter Cartwright	Classic Mac OS
1998	Slithereens	Jesse Liesch	Classic Mac OS
1999	Cythera	Glenn Andreas	Classic Mac OS
1999	Ares	Nathan Lamont	Classic Mac OS
1999	Ferazel's Wand	Ben Spees	Classic Mac OS
2001	Pillars of Garendall	Beenox	Classic Mac OS, OS X (Note: PowerPC only), Windows
2001	Deimos Rising	Sheryn Wareing, David Wareing	Classic Mac OS, OS X, Windows
2002	Coldstone (game engine)	Beenox	Classic Mac OS, OS X
2002	Escape Velocity Nova	Matt Burch, ATMOS	Classic Mac OS, OS X, Windows
2002	Bubble Trouble X	Alex Metcalf, David Wareing	Classic Mac OS, OS X
2002	pop-pop	Andrew Campbell	Classic Mac OS, OS X, Windows
2003	Uplink	Introversion Software	Classic Mac OS, OS X
2003	Aki Mahjong Solitaire	Liquid Metal Software	OS X
2004	Apeiron X	Andrew Welch	Classic Mac OS, OS X
2005	GooBall	Over the Edge Entertainment	OS X
2005	Darwinia	Introversion Software	OS X
2005	El Ballo	ProRattaFactor	Classic Mac OS, OS X
2006	Redline	Jonas Echterhoff	OS X
2006	SketchFighter 4000 Alpha	Lars Gäfvert	OS X
2007	DEFCON	Introversion Software	OS X
2008	Aki Mahjong Mobile	Kent Sutherland	iOS
2008	Mr. Sudoku	Tod Baudais	iOS
2008	mondo Solitaire	Glenn Andreas	iOS
2008	mondo Top 5 Solitaire	Glenn Andreas	iOS
2008	Aquaria	Bit Blot	OS X
2009	Multiwinia	Introversion Software	OS X
2010	Aki Mahjong for iPad	Jerome Knope	iOS
2010	Mr. Sudoku for iPad	Tod Baudais	iOS
2010	Mondo Solitaire for iPad	Glenn Andreas	iOS
2010	Mondo Top 5 Solitaire for iPad	Glenn Andreas	iOS
2011	Mondo Solitaire for Mac	Glenn Andreas	OS X (Note: Intel only)
2011	HypnoBlocks	Lars Gäfvert	iOS

Ambrosia, in conjunction with DG Associates, has also released the Escape Velocity Nova card-driven board game.

=== Productivity software ===
Ambrosia Software's utilities, in order of release:

- Eclipse — Screen saver CDEV
- Big Cheese Key — FKey to mask screen image from boss.
- FlashWrite — Text editor Desk Accessory
- FlashWrite ][
- ColorSwitch — Menu bar item to change monitor color depth
- EasyEnvelopes — Envelope printing Desk accessory. Later a Mac OS X v10.4 and Mac OS X v10.5 Dashboard widget.
- Snapz
- To Do!
- Oracle
- ColorSwitch Pro
- Snapz Pro — Screen capture application
- iSeek — Desktop search application
- Snapz Pro X — Mac OS X-compatible version of original
- WireTap Pro — Audio recording utility
- Screen Cleaner Pro — April Fool's joke
- Dragster — File transfer application
- iToner — iPhone custom ringtone transfer utility
- WireTap Studio — Audio recording, editing and master storage; won a 2007 "Eddy Award" from Macworld
- WireTap Anywhere — professional virtual audio patchbay utility, enabling the recording of any Mac OS X application's audio output from within any Mac OS X audio application.
- Soundboard — Mac OS X Audio playback ("computerized cart machine")
- Big Cheese Key X — Mac OS X-compatible version of original

== Abandoned projects ==
In 1996, Ambrosia announced the development of a 3D horror-themed adventure game called Manse by Brian Barnes. It was demoed at Macworld Expo in 1998.

In 2000, Ben Spees worked on a racing/combat game called Ragnarok for Ambrosia.

In 2014, Tod Baudais claimed to be continuing work on a cancelled Ambrosia project called Goo Moo, or Gooliens, a game about a green alien blob that must grow in size in order to abduct cows.

== Shareware policies ==
One of Ambrosia's founding mantras was that shareware software should not be distributed as crippleware. The company's software was released on the honor system with only a short reminder that you had used the unregistered software for "x" amount of time, creating what is commonly called nagware.

This policy was later changed and the company employed typical shareware piracy prevention measures, as well as more innovative ones such as used in the Escape Velocity line of games where the team's mascot, Hector the Parrot (known in-game as Cap'n Hector), would use her heavily armed ship to ceaselessly attack players of unregistered copies after the trial period had expired. Their software products therefore began to fall under the category of crippleware. Although the company no longer provides new expiring license codes, Ambrosia's founder Andrew Welch released Decoder Ring which allows anyone to generate new license codes.

Matt Slot has written about the factors that played into the policy change.
