= Escape Velocity Nova =

2002 video game

- Developers: Ambrosia Software and ATMOS
- Publisher: Ambrosia Software
- Director: Andrew Welch
- Designer: Matt Burch
- Series: Escape Velocity
- Platforms: Mac OS 9, Mac OS X and Windows
- Release: WW: March 19, 2002
- Genre: Space trading and combat game
- Mode: Single player

Escape Velocity Nova (a.k.a. EV Nova or EVN) is a video game developed by Ambrosia Software in collaboration with ATMOS. It is the third game in the Escape Velocity series of space trading and combat games. It was released on March 19, 2002 for Mac OS X and Mac OS 9, and later ported to Windows and released on July 11, 2003. The game's premise, set in a time period after mankind has discovered hyperspace technology, grants the player freedom to take missions, trade goods, steal from other ships, and enter one of six storylines.

Originally a plug-in for Escape Velocity Override created by ATMOS, Nova development began with Ambrosia contracting ATMOS to make the plug-in the scenario for a new game. ATMOS developed the scenario and graphics, while Matt Burch developed the game engine. The game features six different mutually exclusive plot lines, but players have control to act as they will from the start of the game. Reception to the game praised the gameplay, plot, and ability to be replayed, but was critical of the lack of a soundtrack, repetitiveness, and pace and difficulty of the storylines.

== Gameplay and plot ==
A typical in-game screen of Escape Velocity Nova. The player's shuttle is in the center, while a Federation ship is in battle above and to the left. At the right is a player interface.

In Escape Velocity Nova, the player is placed in command of a shuttlecraft in space. The game is played from a top-down perspective in 2D. A tutorial is offered, but players are granted freedom to act as they will at the start. Players can earn money by purchasing and trading goods, taking missions transporting people or goods to various locations, or by stealing from other ships. The player's ship moves between systems of planets by using a hyperspace jump. At various planets, the player can take on missions and trade goods, buy new ships, or outfit their current ship with new weapons and accessories. Ship classes vary from shuttlecraft to large frigates. There are six different storylines within the game that can be played; each one is mutually exclusive and a new game must be begun to play a different story. A player's choices in the plot can impact the political alignment of the entire map. If players become strong enough, they can demand tribute from a system. Doing so will cause the system to deploy its fleet of ships, but should the player defeat the fleet, the system recognizes the player as its warlord and pays tribute.

Escape Velocity Nova is a shareware game. Its status is enforced in game by a character named Captain Hector, who will continuously remind the player to pay their shareware fee. The game also supports plug-ins, allowing players to create their own ships and campaigns, but access to do so is disallowed if the shareware fee is not paid.

Set in the year 1177 N.C., Escape Velocity Nova's plot begins long after mankind has begun to explore outer space. Years before, a person named Omata Kane designed a "hypergate" system connecting systems of human-inhabited worlds that had been discovered by colonists from Earth. Terrorists destroyed the hypergate in the Sol system, which damaged the entire network. With this isolation, warlords arose and fell in the various disconnected systems. The later invention of hyperspace technology allowed for the lost systems to be reconnected, and resulted in order. Centered around Earth and the Sol system is the Federation, while to the south is the Auroran Empire, categorized as "a savage race". Another group, called the Polaris, hold the east, while the north and west are unexplored territory. The player, having just purchased a shuttle, is cast out to begin a life as the captain of their own ship.

== Development ==
Nova began as a plug-in for Ambrosia Software's Escape Velocity Override in July 1998. A group of students from Tasmania: Dafydd Williams, Jason Cook, and Scott Vardy were fans of Override and began working on a modding project called Override Nova. Their updates on the project were shared on Ambrosia Software's website forums, which caught the attention of Ambrosia employee Andrew Welch. Shortly afterward, the student group took the name ATMOS Software and signed a contract with Ambrosia to work on a new game. Ambrosia Software's Matt Burch developed the game engine, while Welch managed the project and ATMOS developed the graphics and scenario. Burch, who had programmed Escape Velocity and Override, programmed Nova while also working a second job as an engineer. In July 2000, Ambrosia contracted ATMOS to convert the plug-in into the scenario for Nova. Development of the game from Override took approximately 12 months, with an additional 8 months of beta testing. Escape Velocity Nova was released on March 19, 2002 for Mac, and received both OS X and OS 9 releases. Later that year was announced to be receiving a Windows port, which was released on July 11, 2003. A 2008 update for Mac was built as a universal binary with native support for Intel processors.

== Reception ==
Reception

Review scores
| Publication | Score |
|---|---|
| PC Gamer (UK) | 71% |
| Macworld | 4/5 |
| Inside Mac Games | 8.0/10 |
| MacAddict | 4/5 |

Escape Velocity Nova received praise for its gameplay and game design, especially in light of it being a shareware game. MacAddict gave Escape Velocity Nova its Editor's Choice Award. Reviewer Chris Barylick stated that the gameplay is essentially the same as its predecessors, Escape Velocity and Override. He called the game "more beautifully designed than you could expect a shareware game to be". Two years after the game's release, Barylick said the game was still worth the download. In a review for Inside Mac Games, Richard Porcher expressed that Nova's graphics were superior for a shareware game. Macworld's Peter Cohen lauded the combination of action-based space battles with adventure-style gaming. He noted the game made improvements over Nova's predecessors while stating that Ambrosia Software "has wisely left alone what ain't broken."

The game's story and game length received more mixed reviews. Porcher stated that Nova's strongest point is its ability to be replayed repeatedly, especially with support for plug-ins in the game. He also pointed out flaws with the storylines being too easy and the plot lines being mutually exclusive, but felt all would be addressed with plug-ins. PC Gamer's J.T. Trollman gave praise for the game's story writing but was critical of the game's lengthy repetition and time span between points in the story. By contrast, MacNN was critical of the small universe size and dialogue, though it called the game "extraordinary" and praised the game's replayability.

== See also ==
- Endless Sky
