= Bubble Trouble (1996 video game) =

- Developer: Ambrosia Software
- Publisher: Ambrosia Software
- Platforms: Mac OS 7, Mac OS X
- Release: November 23, 1996
- Genre: Maze
- Mode: Single-player

Bubble Trouble is a maze video game released for Mac OS 7 by Ambrosia Software in 1996. It is a clone of Sega's 1982 Pengo arcade video game with the penguin recast as a goldfish and the setting moved underwater.

== Gameplay ==
Bubbles appear all over the playing field and can be used to defeat the balls by launching them in their direction, crushing them. However, the bubbles are just as deadly to the player if they are launched in their direction. Only certain tougher enemies can launch bubbles. Certain bubbles contain useful items, pushing them together can rack up points. Bubbles that are blue, purple, yellow, or green will bounce off of surfaces once they have been launched, bouncing a number of times dependent on their color, for example blues bounce once, purples twice etc. Some bubbles also contain dynamite, which will detonate either by igniting or by being pushed towards a target. There are two kinds of dynamite, a red one and a purple one; the latter has a much larger blast radius. Occasionally, a bonus bubble will float up across the screen, which can bestow powers of invisibility, or temporarily capture all enemies in static bubbles. Bubbles containing the letters of the word "extra" also appear, which provide a score bonus to the player and the equivalent of the capture bubble when all five are collected.

There are four kinds of enemies in the game.

1. Chombert the Piranha - He is slow, and easy to avoid. He cannot push bubbles around.
2. Remington Eel - Moves faster than Chombert, and can push bubbles around.
3. Normal the Shark - Has the capability to launch a special bubble to trap the player.
4. Haarrfish - The most dangerous enemy in the game. She is extremely fast, and can push bubbles around in quick succession. Haarrfish will appear on any level if the player manages to push two of the gem-containing bubbles together with only a few of the enemies remaining out of the original complement.

== Reception ==
"About This Particular Macintosh" wrote "In summary, the interface and controls are delightfully simple. The graphics and sound are rich. Difficulty is enough to hold adults' interest, yet it's still enjoyable for children. Bubble Trouble is well worth the purchase price of $15".

== Legacy ==
A new version of the game titled Bubble Trouble X was released for Mac OS X in 2002. It includes a level editor. The editor cannot be used without a license for the OS X version, although owning a prior "Classic" license provides a discount on the cost of a new one.
