= Pengo (video game) =

1982 video game

- North American arcade flyer
- Developer: Coreland (Note: Game Gear version by Arc System Works)
- Publisher: Sega
- Designers: Nobuo Kodera; Tsutomu Iwane; Akira Nakakuma; Shinji Egi
- Platforms: Arcade, Atari 5200, Atari 8-bit, Atari 2600, Game Gear, mobile phone, Sharp Zaurus
- Release: September 1982: Arcade; JP: September 1982; NA: October 1982; EU: December 1982 5200; December 1983 Atari 8-bit; March 1984 2600; May 1984 Game Gear; JP: October 6, 1990; EU: December 12, 1991 Mobile; JP: August 27, 2001 Zaurus; JP: September 2001
- Genre: Maze
- Modes: Single-player, multiplayer

Pengo (ペンゴ) is a 1982 maze video game developed by Coreland and published by Sega for arcades. The player controls Pengo, a red penguin who resides in the Antarctic. The game takes place in an overhead maze made of ice blocks, where Pengo crushes blob-like Sno-Bees by sliding blocks into them. The objective is to survive each round by eliminating all Sno-Bees and Sno-Bee eggs, while optionally lining up the three diamond blocks to earn a large score bonus.

There are two versions of the arcade game: the first uses "Popcorn" as the theme, and the second has original music. There are other small differences as well. Pengo was ported to the Atari 2600, Atari 5200, Atari 8-bit computers, and Game Gear.

== Gameplay ==
The start of a round with Pengo in the center (arcade)

The player uses a four-position joystick and a single button to control Pengo, a penguin character. Pressing the button while pushing the joystick against an ice block will cause it to slide in that direction until it hits another block or a wall if the space ahead of it is empty. If that space is occupied, pressing the button will crush the block instead.

The goal is to destroy every Sno-Bee on the board by sliding ice blocks to crush them, crushing blocks that contain unhatched Sno-Bee eggs, or running over them after stunning them at a wall. Doing so in less than 60 seconds awards bonus points based on the time taken.

At the start of each round, a certain number of eggs hatch into Sno-Bees, while other blocks flash to indicate that they contain eggs. As the player destroys active Sno-Bees, new ones hatch from the eggs to replace them. Crushing multiple Sno-Bees with one block awards extra points. The Sno-Bees can crush blocks in an attempt to reach Pengo. Pushing against a wall causes it to vibrate and temporarily stuns any Sno-Bees in contact with it; the player may then crush them with a block or simply run over them to destroy them.

Three blocks in each round are marked with diamonds and cannot be crushed. Bonus points are awarded for forming a continuous vertical or horizontal line of these blocks: 10,000 if none of them are touching a wall, or 5,000 otherwise. Forming such a line also stuns every active Sno-Bee for a short time.

If the player survives for two minutes without either losing a life or completing the round, all active Sno-Bees become Blobs. Their movement speed increases and they will move directly toward one of the walls, crushing all ice blocks in their path. Once a Blob reaches a wall, it will move toward a corner of the screen and disappear upon reaching it. Once all Blobs have either disappeared or been destroyed, the round ends. If the player destroys one of the last two Sno-Bees, the survivor will become a Blob after a 12-second delay. However, if the player destroys multiple Sno-Bees and leaves only one alive, it will become a Blob immediately.

The game includes a total of 16 rounds. After every second round, one of six intermission animations is displayed. It then repeats indefinitely.

One life is lost whenever Pengo touches an un-stunned Sno-Bee or Blob. When all lives are lost, the game ends.

== Reception ==
Reception

Review score
Publication	Score
Famitsu	5/10, 6/10, 7/10, 5/10 (Game Gear)

In Japan, the annual Game Machine chart listed Pengo as the fourth highest-grossing arcade game of 1982. Game Machine later listed Pengo as the fifteenth top-grossing table arcade cabinet of May 1983. In North America, the game was a commercial arcade success for Sega in 1982, selling an estimated 2,000 arcade cabinets in the United States.

Computer and Video Games (C&VG) magazine gave it a highly positive review upon release, calling it "the cutest of coin-operated video games" and praising the "wonderful graphics, delightful characterisation, plenty of scope to work out your own" tactics, "catchy melody" and "that feeling of satisfaction you get when an ice-block picks up speed and knocks all the wind out of a surprised sno-bee!" Four members of the C&VG team gave a verdict that "is unanimous... Pengo is the C&VG tip for 1983".

== Legacy ==
In 1982 and 1983, Bandai Electronics created two official Sega licensed handheld games featuring Pengo. The first was an LCD pocket game, the second a VFD tabletop version. In 1995, a brand new game called Pepenga Pengo was released for the Mega Drive only in Japan.

According to Zero magazine, Hudson Soft's Bomberman series adopted gameplay elements from Pengo.

In 2010, a location test for a widescreen remake was announced in arcades, which features eight player multiplay. A second location test took place at Sega Shinjuku Nishiguchi in May 2012. During the 3rd location test at Club Sega Akihabara Shinkan between July 14 and 16, 2012 as part of the four-game compilation title Ge-sen Love ~Plus Pengo!~ (ゲーセンラブ。～プラス ペンゴ！～), the game was made available as a download by RINGEDGE2 machines through Sega's new ALL.NET P-ras multi-game network, and was later released on September 20, 2012. The compilation title is included with the Xbox 360 game Ge-sen Love Plus Pengo!.

=== Clones ===
Contemporaraneous Pengo clones include Orca's Penga, Pengi for the BBC Micro and Acorn Electron, Percy Penguin for the Commodore 64, Block Buster for the VIC-20, Chilly Willy for the Microbee, Pengon for the TRS-80 Color Computer, the unrelated Pengon for Atari 8-bit computers, Pengy for the Atari ST, Freez'Bees and Do-Do for the ZX Spectrum, Stone Age for the VTech CreatiVision, and Pango for MS-DOS. Hopper is a clone for the TI-99/4A with a kangaroo instead of a penguin. Bubble Trouble is an underwater-themed adaptation for Macintosh computers.
