= Apeiron (disambiguation) =

Apeiron is an ancient cosmological concept.

Apeiron may also refer to:

- Apeiron (journal), an academic journal
- Apeiron (video game), a 1995 video game
- VSS Apeiron, a Delta-class SpaceShipTwo tourist spaceplane from Virgin Galactic

== See also ==
- Apeirogon
- Aphelion
