= SketchFighter 4000 Alpha =

2006 Metroidvania video game

- Developer: Lost Minds
- Publishers: Ambrosia Software; Lost Minds (Revival)
- Designer: Lars Gäfvert
- Platform: Mac OS X
- Release: November 30, 2006
- Genres: Scrolling shooter, Metroidvania
- Modes: Single-player, multiplayer

SketchFighter 4000 Alpha is a 2006 Metroidvania scrolling shooter video game developed by Lost Minds and originally published by Ambrosia Software for Mac OS X. SketchFighter uses OpenGL and a custom game engine to create visuals for all elements of the game reminiscent of hand-drawn sketches.

SketchFighter was originally released on November 30, 2006 as shareware; specifically, crippleware as only a subset of the game is playable prior to registration.

In 2020, SketchFighter was re-released for the Mac App Store by Lost Minds after Ambrosia closed its doors.

== Gameplay ==
SketchFighter's gameplay consists of using the ship to explore different "zones". The ship can move forward and backward and rotate and fire in the direction it is facing. Players fight a variety of enemies as they progress through the game and acquire different power-ups, such as weapon types, different colors of weapons, improved shields, and faster and stronger engines. Some of these power-ups require defeating a boss.

SketchFighter has two-player cooperative and competitive modes. It includes a web-based high score board and a level generator that the player can use to create their own levels.
