= Ferazel's Wand =

1999 video game

- Developer: Ambrosia Software
- Publisher: Ambrosia Software
- Designer: Ben Spees
- Platform: Classic Mac OS
- Release: March 2000
- Genre: Platform

Ferazel's Wand is a 2000 platform game developed by Ambrosia Software for the Mac OS. As the wizard Ferazel, players explore side-scrolling levels and use spells to defeat monsters and locate an exit. It was the first CD-ROM distributed by the developer commercially. Upon release, Ferazel's Wand received positive reviews, with critics praising the game's balance of accessibility and simplicity with its challenging gameplay.

== Gameplay ==
Players assume the role of a wizard name Ferazel, a member of the subterranean race of Habnabits. Ferazel is tasked to repeal Dread Queen Xichra and her minions of Manditraki, who have invaded the caverns of the Habnabits. Ferazel's Wand is a platform video game in which players can jump, swing and swim through the side-scrolling environment, whilst avoiding hazards such as wind or ice. Parallax scrolling adds layers of depth to the background. Players use a fireball spell to defeat enemies, including spiders, goblins and armadillos, and can collect additional spell abilities as the game progresses. The game features 23 levels across 7 worlds set in the Seven Lands of Teraknorn. Completion of a level is made by reaching one of several exits, and displays a summary showing the number of enemies killed and secrets discovered.

== Development and release ==
Ferazel's Wand was designed by Ben Spees. It was the first title to be distributed on CD-ROM by developer Ambrosia Software, and was packaged with other titles from the developer. The game was showcased at Macworld Expo in San Francisco in 2000. MacHome Journal wrote the game shipped by March 2000.

== Reception ==
Reception

Review scores
| Publication | Score |
|---|---|
| Macworld | 4/5 |
| Inside Mac Games | 9/10 |
| MacHome Journal | 5/5 |

Several critics found the gameplay accessible but challenging, with Macworld praising its "pleasing compromise" between accessible gameplay for all ages and challenge, considering the controls as forgiving. They wrote whilst the "cartoonish" visuals resembled a "little kids game", their presentation could appeal to younger players. B-Link praised the game's visuals as "clever" and its sound effects and music as "imaginative", citing them as highlights of the game. MacHome Jorunal praised the game as the "best two-dimensional platform game ever", highlighting its gameplay, enemy design and soundtrack. Praising the visual presentation of levels due to their "impressive" lighting and particles, Inside Mac Games found their open-ended design promoted "cautious exploration" and promoted a "sense of depth and detail rarely seen in action games", although viewed the game became very difficult in the second half of the game.
