= Escape Velocity Override =

1998 video game

EV Override
- Developer: Ambrosia Software
- Publisher: Ambrosia Software
- Designer: Matt Burch
- Writer: Peter Cartwright
- Series: Escape Velocity
- Platform: Mac OS
- Release: 1998
- Genre: Space trading and combat simulator
- Mode: Single-player

Escape Velocity Override is a space trading simulator game written by Peter Cartwright, with the support of his school-friends, and developed by Ambrosia Software for the Apple Macintosh. It is the sequel to Escape Velocity with an extended version of the original game engine, but Override has an entirely new story line set in a different, larger universe.

Escape Velocity and EV Override were written for the classic Mac OS, and therefore run natively only on Mac OS 9 and earlier. However, the third game in the series, Escape Velocity Nova, supports plug-ins (released with Ambrosia's authorization) that simulate the first two titles using the new game's engine. Since EV Nova was made for both Mac OS X and Microsoft Windows, Override - through Nova plug-ins - is also playable on those platforms.

== Gameplay ==
The player controls a ship represented from a bird's-eye point of view in third person. Most of the game takes place within this view, where the player can interact with ships and stellar objects within the star system they are presently in. There are over a hundred star systems in the game, all connected to one another by a series of hyperlanes. The player can utilize the lanes to perform a hyper-jump to a nearby system, which takes one to three days depending on their ship's mass.

Players can land at planets, stations, and some other stellar objects. Here, if the location is inhabited, they can access a mission computer to take jobs, purchase new ships, trade commodities, refuel, customize their ship with various weapons and outfits, and go to a spaceport bar to hire escort ships, watch the news, gamble, and sometimes receive additional unique missions. Not all services are available at all locations. However, all inhabited locations have a mission computer and refueling option, and all stellar objects that can be landed on serve as a haven for the repair of the player's shields and armor.

The star systems of Override are controlled by various governments, each with a different disposition towards the player. Most start off as neutral with the player, though some may restrict access to their planets and stations and still others may be openly hostile and attack the player on sight. The player, however, can change their status with various governments. Taking missions for a government, attacking their enemies, and destroying pirates ("renegades") boosts status, whereas helping opposing governments, attacking a government's and their allies' ships, and pirating civilians will lower their legal rating. Also, affecting the legal status of one government will directly affect those of its allies and inversely affect its enemies. Having a high legal rating will give the player access to missions for that government (which, in turn, can unlock that government's ships and outfits). On the other hand, a low legal status will cause the government to restrict access to their ports and even cause them to attack the player on sight.

Like its predecessor, EV Override is fully open-ended and does not force the player to get involved in any of the game's plots, nor does it make a player continue a plot once they're in it. Players have the option to take the storylines and cause their actions to have a major impact on the galaxy. On the other hand, they can also simply become a commodity trader, cargo runner, or pirate and leave the galaxy to fend for itself. Players can purchase (or capture) and outfit many ships in the game as they see fit, allowing for many methods and styles for playing the game. Also, once they become powerful enough, players also have the option of forcing worlds to pay them daily tribute by destroying their defense fleets. This, however, may cause serious drops in their legal status elsewhere, and causes bounty hunters to start chasing them.

== Reception ==
Reception

Review scores
| Publication | Score |
|---|---|
| Next Generation | 4/5 |
| Macworld | 4.5/5 |

Next Generation reviewed the Macintosh version of the game, rating it four stars out of five, and stated that "The gameplay is similar to that in the first version, but the scope and design behind the new final frontier override any comparisons."

Macworld's Michael Gowan praised Escape Velocity.
