= Avara =

1996 video game

- Publisher: Ambrosia Software
- Designer: Juri Munkki
- Artists: Matthew Schroeder; Joe Raffa
- Platform: Classic Mac OS
- Release: WW: September 17, 1996
- Genre: First-person shooter
- Modes: Single-player, multiplayer

Avara is a 1996 first-person shooter written by Juri Munkki for Macintosh and published by Ambrosia Software. A fast 3D engine, integrated Internet play, and easy level editing were notable features at the time of its release. While not commercially successful, the game found a cult following. Munkki publicly released the source code in 2016, the game's 20th anniversary.

== Gameplay ==
Avara gameplay. Near the left is a HECTOR robot.

Players operated a remote-controlled bipedal robot known as a Hostile Environment Combat and Tactical Operations Remote, or HECTOR. The unit's characteristics were customizable, ranging in mass from 150 to 220 kilograms (330 to 490 lb), and stood about 2 meters (7 ft) tall. Larger models could hold more weaponry, useful in the game's primary mode as a shooter, but were less maneuverable in combat. The name HECTOR represents a thinly-guised tribute to Hector D. Byrd, Ambrosia's mascot, a female grey parrot.

Flying scout units controlled by each player provided an aerial view of the action, but were defenseless and could be destroyed by enemies or other HECTORs. Up to 6 players could join a game at once, either free-for-all, or in arbitrary teams which were chosen by color. Team color choice also affected the in-game HECTOR model's appearance. During games, players could communicate using an integrated text-based chat system.

Level maps for the engine's fully 3D world could be created using user-friendly, vector-based drawing programs such as ClarisWorks, ClarisDraw, or ShareDraw. Avara was bundled with some of these level packs, both for solo play and multiplayer modes, and fan-created packs were available for download from Ambrosia's website.

== Reception ==
Avara was a commercial flop. At the time, it was Ambrosia's poorest selling game next to Chiral.

== Legacy ==
In 2017, Munkki posted the source to his GitHub account, under the MIT software license. In September 2018, a fan-made port of Avara was posted on GitHub. It supports recent versions of Windows, Mac OS, and Linux.
