= Apeiron (video game) =

1995 video game

- Developer: Ambrosia Software
- Publisher: Ambrosia Software
- Designer: Andrew Welch
- Platforms: Mac OS, Mac OS X
- Release: February 11, 1995; November 29, 2004
- Genre: Fixed shooter
- Mode: Single-player

Apeiron is a Macintosh game developed and released as shareware by Ambrosia Software. An adaptation of the 1980 arcade game Centipede, it was first released on February 11, 1995. In November 2004, a Mac OS X port was made available.

== Reception ==
Apeiron

Review score
Publication	Score
Macworld	4/5

Writing in the 1996 edition of The Macintosh Bible, Bart Farkas called Apeiron a "classic" and "the best Centipede clone on the market". MacAddict named it one of the Macintosh's essential titles. The magazine's Kathy Tafel cited it as "a cool implementation" of the Centipede formula.
