= Maelstrom (1992 video game) =

1992 video game

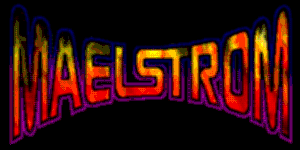
- Developer: Ambrosia Software
- Publisher: Ambrosia Software
- Programmer: Andrew Welch
- Platforms: Classic Mac OS; Windows; macOS; Linux; iOS; iPadOS
- Release: 1992
- Genre: Multidirectional shooter
- Mode: Single-player

Maelstrom is a multidirectional shooter developed by Andrew Welch and released as shareware in November 1992 for Mac OS. The game is an enhanced clone of Atari, Inc.'s 1979 Asteroids arcade video game with a visual style similar to the Atari Games 1987 sequel, Blasteroids. Maelstrom was released when there were few action games for the high-resolution color displays of the Macintosh, and the game attracted attention despite the dated concept. The response led Welch to start Ambrosia Software.

The game was later released as free and open-source software, resulting in ports for other platforms.

== Gameplay ==
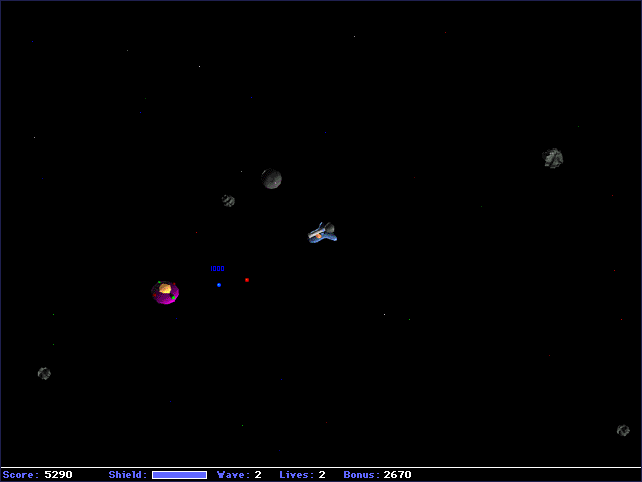
Gameplay screenshot

Maelstrom is played in a 2D section of space. The goal is to shoot drifting asteroids with a plasma cannon from a spaceship and avoid being hit by the rocks and other enemies. The ship is moved by changing its orientation and pressing a key to apply forward thrust. It has a limited amount of shield. The player may also pick up power-ups.

== Development ==
Maelstrom was created using THINK C and uses 18,000 lines of C code with 9,000 lines of inline assembly language.

== Reception ==
In 1993, Maelstrom won "Best New Macintosh Product" in the "Shareware Industry Awards for Best Game," as well as receiving other awards.

== Legacy ==
Welch gave the source code to Sam Lantinga, who created an SVGAlib and later SDL port for Linux and released it in 1995. It included networked multiplayer.

In 1999 Ambrosia Software released Lantinga's version 3.0 as open-source software under the terms of the GNU General Public License (GPL).

In 2010, Andrew Welch and Ian Gilman released the game's contents under the free Creative Commons license Attribution, which makes Maelstrom completely free and open-source software.

In May 2026, version 4.0 of Maelstrom was released for multiple platforms, including Steam and iOS. The mobile version uses on-screen controls that replicate the behavior of the keyboard from the original implementation.
