= Inside Mac Games =

Electronic video game magazine

- Website type: Mac gaming news site
- Owner: Tuncer Deniz
- Creator: Tuncer Deniz
- Website: www.insidemacgames.com
- Commercial: Yes
- Registration: Optional
- Launched: 1993 (as a magazine)
- Current status: Online

Inside Mac Games (IMG) started in 1993 as an electronic magazine about video games for the Mac. It was distributed on floppy disk, then CD-ROM, and eventually became a website.

== History ==
In 1992, Tuncer Deniz, who was unemployed, decided to create a magazine called Inside Mac Games — he came up with the name after seeing a copy of Inside Sports at a newsstand — that would be dedicated to reviews of new and upcoming Macintosh computer games. Deniz interested a friend, Jon Blum, in the project, but neither of them had the capital or the expertise to publish a print magazine. Instead, they envisioned an electronic magazine.

Using a shareware lay-out program, Deniz and Blum created the first issue, which contained reviews of four flight simulators — Parsoft Interactive's Hellcats Over the Pacific and Missions at Leyte Gulf, Spectrum HoloByte's Falcon MC, and Microsoft Flight Simulator 4.0 — as well as hints, Easter eggs and reviews about older games such as Maelstrom and Tom Landry Strategy Football, and most importantly, a playable preview of F/A-18 Hornet that Graphic Simulations planned to release in a few months.

Deniz and Blum decided to offer two annual subscription plans: either $18 for a downloadable version of the magazine; or for $24, the subscriber would receive a monthly floppy disk in the mail that would not only contain the magazine, but also software patches and updates for popular games, as well as a shareware Game of the Month.

In February 1993, they uploaded a promotional file to AOL that contained portions of Issue 1. Enough people downloaded the file and subsequently paid for a subscription that Deniz and Blum were able to produce Issue 2 the next month. Several months later, sales increased substantially when Graphic Simulations released F/A-18 Hornet and included a promotional flyer for IMG in the box.

In 1995, IMG switched from floppy disks to CD-ROMs, allowing for much more high quality content and games, and increased the annual subscription rate to $59. In August of that year, Paul Murphy reviewed one of their CD-ROMs for Dragon and called it "a great deal", although he noted that the magazine itself was "somewhat unexciting [...] IMG articles are competent and serviceable, with no distinctive voices, styles or viewpoints." It was the commercial software demos and shareware included on the CD-ROMs that Murphy called "the real charm and value of the IMG CD." Murphy concluded that in the absence of any other magazines dedicated to Mac games, "Mac game fans need Inside Mac Games to separate the wheat from the chaff. The demos and shareware [are] a barrel of fun and solid value."

In 1996, Deniz left IMG to work for Bungie, but returned in 1999. The following year, the CD-ROM distribution of the magazine was dropped in favour of downloads from the IMG website. By 2005, Deniz had opened an on-line software store through the IMG website, using a subscription model of $29 per month for a monthly free game and discounts on other products.

From 2005 to 2006, IMG produced a weekly podcast, hosted by game designers Justin Ficarrotta and Will Miller, and critic Blake Buck. that featured Mac game news, reviews and general discussion. After 33 episodes, the original hosts left to start a new podcast, and the IMG podcast was relaunched later the same year with a new host, running for a further 38 episodes.

By 2010, interest in Mac-exclusive games had cooled, and by 2018, the IMG website was reduced to the user forums, with a link to Tuncer Deniz's on-line software store.
