= War Pinball =

2011 video game

- App icon
- Developer: OOO Gameprom
- Publisher: OOO Gameprom
- Platforms: Android, iOS
- Release: March 20, 2011
- Genre: Pinball
- Mode: Single-player

War Pinball is a 2011 pinball game developed and published by the Russian studio OOO Gameprom and released on March 20, 2011.

== Reception ==
On Metacritic, War Pinball has a "generally favorable" score of 85% based on seven critics.

Multiple critics gave positive reviews.
