= Wizardry V: Heart of the Maelstrom =

1988 video game

- Cover art for Apple, C64, and IBM PC
- Developer: Sir-Tech (Note: PC Engine CD version developed by Access Super NES version developed by Game Studio.)
- Publisher: Sir-Tech (Note: PC-88, PC-98, and Japanese Super NES and Satellaview releases published by ASCII Entertainment. PC Engine CD version published by Naxat Soft. Super NES version published by Capcom in North America.)
- Designers: Andrew C. Greenberg; David W. Bradley
- Composer: Kohei Tanaka (FM Towns)
- Series: Wizardry
- Platforms: Apple II, Commodore 64, IBM PC, Super NES, Satellaview, NEC PC-88, PC-98, FM Towns, PC Engine CD
- Release: Q4 1988: Apple II, C64, IBM PC; NA: Q4 1988; PC-88, PC-98; JP: June 8, 1990; FM Towns; JP: December 1990; PC Engine CD; JP: September 25, 1992; Super NES; JP: November 20, 1992; NA: April 1994
- Genre: Role-playing
- Mode: Single-player

Wizardry V: Heart of the Maelstrom is the fifth scenario in the Wizardry series of role-playing video games. It was published in 1988 by Sir-Tech for the Commodore 64, Apple II, and IBM PC compatibles (as a self-booting disk) . A port for the Super Famicom and FM Towns was later developed and published by ASCII Entertainment in Japan. Wizardry V was released in the US for the Super NES by Capcom in 1993, and subsequently re-released for the Satellaview subsystem under the name BS Wizardry 5.

== Plot ==
Following from the events of Wizardry III: Legacy of Llylgamyn, Heart of the Maelstrom begins after a period of peace brought about through the use of L'Kbreth's Orb is shattered when the powers of chaos literally begin to emerge into the world. These unnatural energies are especially focused in a series of tunnels beneath the Temple of Sages in Llylgamyn, fittingly called the Maelstrom. Adventurers, namely the player party, are recruited to journey into these caverns and track down a means of summoning a being known as the Gatekeeper who can seal these chaotic energies once more. Unfortunately, he has been imprisoned by a rogue sorceress known as the Sorn.

The party begins by searching for G'bli Gedook, a high priest and guardian of L'Kbreth's Orb. He instructs the party to venture deeper into the caverns. After traversing down to the eighth floor, the party must appease four beings known as the Card Lords by bringing them their respective suit. Once this task is accomplished, the party can venture to the Heart of the Maelstrom and the Gatekeeper may be summoned. As this occurs, the Sorn and her own party of adventurers strike, prompting a final battle. With her defeat, the Gatekeeper awards the party the Heart of Abriel. They return with this to the surface and order is restored to Llylgamyn.

== Development ==
Wizardry V's design was based on a game that Bradley had previously written and pitched to Sir-Tech. Sir-Tech asked Bradley to rewrite the game to fit into the Wizardry franchise. This was finished in 1986, but Wizardry V was held back for two years while Wizardry IV: The Return of Werdna was completed.

After Wizardry IV—which did not upgrade its graphics from the first game in the series—sold very poorly, Sir-Tech advertised Wizardry V as "breaking away from the Wizardry system of the past".

The FM Towns version of Wizardry V, released in 1990, featured an orchestral music soundtrack scored by Japanese composer Kohei Tanaka.

== Reception ==
The game was reviewed in 1989 in Dragon #145 by Hartley, Patricia, and Kirk Lesser in "The Role of Computers" column. The reviewers gave the game 4 out of 5 stars. Computer Gaming World's Dennis Owens in 1989 noted the game's similarity to the first three games, saying, "Heart of the Maelstrom is, at once, both more simple than Return of Werdna and improved over the first three scenarios". He also noted, however, that the game played slowly due to extensive disk access. The magazine's Scorpia in 1991 and 1993 wrote that the game was "better than some, not as good as others". Compute! said that the game was good for both those new to and familiar with the series, but criticized the IBM PC version's use of CGA instead of EGA or VGA graphics.

Reviewing the SNES version, GamePro opined that though the non-hostile monsters, riddles, and puzzles are admirable improvements from previous Wizardry games, the gameplay of Wizardry V is still outdated compared to other SNES RPGs such as Final Fantasy IV, noting in particular the need to repeatedly re-enter the same dungeon and the lack of multiple save slots.
