= Wizardry IV: The Return of Werdna =

1987 video game

- Developer: Sir-Tech (Note: PC Engine CD compilation developed by Access. PlayStation version developed by Thunder Stone Japan.)
- Publisher: Sir-Tech (Note: Original Japanese release published by ASCII Entertainment. PC Engine CD version published by Naxat Soft. PlayStation version published by Locus, SuperLite Gold re-release published by Success.)
- Designers: Andrew C. Greenberg; Robert Woodhead; Roe R. Adams III
- Series: Wizardry
- Platforms: Apple II, IBM PC, PC-88, PC-98, Sharp X1, FM-7, PC Engine CD, PlayStation
- Release: December 1987: Apple II, IBM PC; NA: December 1987; PC-88, PC-98; JP: December 15, 1988; Sharp X1; NA: February 1989 FM-7; JP: May 1989 PC Engine CD; JP: March 4, 1994 PlayStation; JP: October 28, 1999
- Genre: Role-playing
- Mode: Single-player

Wizardry IV: The Return of Werdna (originally known as Wizardry: The Return of Werdna - The Fourth Scenario) is a role-playing video game developed and published by Sir-Tech. The fourth installment in the Wizardry series, it was released on personal computers in 1987 and later ported to home consoles, such as the PC Engine CD and the PlayStation, through the Wizardry: New Age of Llylgamyn compilation.

The Return of Werdna is drastically different from the trilogy that precedes it. Rather than continuing the adventures of the player's party from the previous three games, The Return of Werdna's protagonist is Werdna, the evil wizard that was defeated at the end of Wizardry: Proving Grounds of the Mad Overlord and imprisoned at the bottom of his dungeon forever.

== Gameplay ==
The game begins at the bottom of a 10-level dungeon. Most of Werdna's powers are depleted and must be gradually recovered throughout the game. The initial goal is to climb to the top of the dungeon, reclaiming Werdna's full power along the way. Each level has one or more pentagrams at specific points. The pentagrams have three purposes: The first time a pentagram is discovered in a level, Werdna's strength increases, and a portion of his powers are restored. This only happens once per level; finding multiple pentagrams on a single level will not increase his powers multiple times. The second purpose is that monsters may be summoned from the pentagrams. The higher the level, the stronger the monsters available. There is no cost to summoning monsters, but only three parties of monsters may be summoned at a time, and any existing monsters will be replaced by the summoned ones. The third purpose is that pentagrams refresh Werdna's health and spellcasting capacity.

Instead of fighting monsters, the player fights against the heroes from the past three Wizardry games. Players of the first three games who sent their character disks to Sir-Tech might have their characters present in Wizardry IV.

== Release ==
The release of Wizardry IV was delayed for years, and did not get released until late 1987. Sir-Tech was confident that it would release the game in time for Christmas 1984 that the company told inCider to announce it as already available in the November 1984 issue. The company listed the game with a price in a 1985 catalog, but Computer Gaming World advised "I wouldn't send any money off for it yet; this has been one of the most-delayed games in adventure history (surpassing even the year-long wait for Ultima IV), and the date of its release is still up in the air". In 1986 Robert Woodhead attributed the delay in "certain 'un-named' products" at Sir-Tech to the time required to port them to UCSD p-System.

== Copy protection ==
The Return of Werdna had an unusual form of copy protection. No attempt was made to prevent copying of the game disks. Instead, the package included a book containing a long list of 16-digit "MordorCharge card" numbers, designed to resemble credit card numbers. This book was printed on dark red paper to make photocopying difficult. After completing the first level in the game, the player is given a randomly chosen 12-digit number, and asked for the last four digits. The player must look up the corresponding number in the book and type it in to proceed.

This tactic effectively gave those who made copies of the game a free demo of the first level before demanding that the player show proof of purchase. However, the algorithm for computing the MordorCharge numbers was not very complicated. Those having knowledge of the method could calculate the correct response using a small lookup table and some relatively simple arithmetic.

Although such means of discouraging copying would be considered little more than a nuisance today, it was fairly effective at a time when few people had access to online services. A similar copy protection, with a more sophisticated code system, was used in the next Wizardry game, Wizardry V: Heart of the Maelstrom.

== Reception ==
Scorpia of Computer Gaming World, who beta tested Wizardry IV, favorably reviewed it in 1987, stating that the game had been worth the long wait before release. She acknowledged that the game was very difficult (and requiring knowledge of Wizardry I), and that during testing "some of the best game players in the country tripped up somewhere (myself included)", but stated that it was "eminently fair and is, perhaps, one of the most finely-balanced games I've ever played. Every puzzle, every encounter, every clue ... has been worked out with careful exactitude". Scorpia criticized the resurrection of defeated enemies after saving and "the same dreary old Wizardry graphics", but concluded "Bottom line: Unique, and not to be missed!"

The game was previewed in 1988 in Dragon #130 by Hartley, Patricia, and Kirk Lesser in "The Role of Computers" column. The Lessers reviewed the IBM PC version of the game in 1989 in Dragon #142, and gave the game 3½ out of 5 stars.

Robbie Robberson previewed and profiled Return of Werdna in Space Gamer/Fantasy Gamer No. 82. Robberson commented that "should be this year's best game in fantasy simulation."

Wizardry IV sold very poorly. Despite the lengthy delay Sir-Tech had not advanced the technology from the first game; The Bard's Tale's graphics were superior, for example, despite being released two years earlier. Further, as Robert Sirotek of Sir-Tech later said, "It was insanely difficult to win that game":

I had such issues with that. I felt that it went way beyond what was necessary in terms of complexity, but the people that developed it felt strongly to leave a mark in the industry that they had the hardest game to play — period, bar none. That's fine if you're not worried about catering to a customer and making sales.

Return of Werdna was the worst-selling product we ever launched. People would buy it, and it was unplayable. So they'd put it down, and word spread around. There were other hard-core players in the market that loved it. They said, "Ah, why doesn't everybody do this?" Well, we don't because you guys are a minority. If you're a glutton for punishment, you're going to have to get your pleasure somewhere else because nobody can survive catering to such a small number of people.

So, it was controversial in that way. In the end, I think I was proven correct that making crazy impossible products in terms of difficulty was not the way forward.

In 1993 Sir-Tech advertised compilations of Wizardry I-III and V-VII. IV was not mentioned, but V was advertised as "breaking away from the Wizardry system of the past".
