= Wizardry: Labyrinth of Lost Souls =

2009 video game

- Developer: Acquire
- Publishers: JP: Acquire; WW: Xseed Games
- Series: Wizardry
- Platforms: PlayStation 3, PlayStation Vita, iOS, Microsoft Windows
- Release: PlayStation 3: JP: December 9, 2009 (PSN); JP: January 27, 2011 (BD); NA: June 3, 2011; EU: December 7, 2011; iOS: JP: July 29, 2011; WW: November 3, 2011; PlayStation Vita: JP: December 3, 2015; Windows: WW: January 15, 2020
- Genres: Role-playing, dungeon crawl
- Mode: Single-player

Wizardry: Labyrinth of Lost Souls is a role-playing video game developed and published by Acquire for the PlayStation 3, PlayStation Vita, iOS, and Microsoft Windows. The game's Japanese title is Wizardry: Torawareshi Tamashī no Meikyū (ウィザードリィ 囚われし魂の迷宮). Although the Wizardry series was originally developed in the US by Sir-Tech, it has been kept alive in Japan by various developers. The dungeon-crawling role-playing game franchise had not been seen in the West since 2001's duo of Wizardry 8 for Windows and Wizardry: Tale of the Forsaken Land for the PlayStation 2.

It was first released on the Japanese PlayStation Network in December 2009 as part of the "Wizardry Renaissance" initiative to revive the series in Japan, and was localized for Western territories by Xseed Games beginning in 2011. The game received mixed reviews, with critics praising its faithfulness to the classic first-person dungeon crawler and its character artwork, while criticizing its minimal story, dated interface, and reliance on grinding and random chance.

== Gameplay ==
Labyrinth of Lost Souls is a first-person dungeon crawler in which the player guides a party of up to six adventurers through grid-based labyrinths, moving one tile at a time and fighting turn-based battles against randomly encountered monsters. The party is arranged in a front row, whose members can attack in melee, and a back row suited to ranged attacks and spellcasting.

Characters are created by choosing a race, an alignment of good, neutral or evil, and a class, then distributing bonus points among six attributes: strength, vitality, agility, luck, intelligence and piety. The available races are human, elf, dwarf, gnome and porklu, each with different attribute tendencies; humans are the most balanced and can enter any of the basic classes, while porklu favour agility and luck and make effective thieves. Alignment restricts which classes a character may take and which characters will adventure together, as good and evil characters cannot be placed in the same party. Classes include the basic fighter, mage, priest and thief, alongside advanced classes such as bishop, samurai, ninja and lord; some of these cannot be chosen at creation and must be reached by changing class later in the game.

Magic is divided into arcane spells and priestly miracles, cast from a limited number of uses that are restored by resting at the inn in town. Equipment and items found in the dungeon are unidentified until appraised, either by a bishop in the party or, for a fee, at the town shop. The town acts as a menu-driven hub containing an inn, a shop, a temple and a guild where new party members are recruited and quests accepted.

The game is deliberately punishing. Characters who die must be revived at the temple, where resurrection can fail and destroy the body permanently, and a party wiped out deep in the labyrinth is lost along with its equipment. Reviewers described the game as offering little guidance and depending heavily on repetition and random chance.

The labyrinths include hidden doors, traps, teleport tiles and dark zones. An automatic map fills in as the party explores, but it can only be viewed while the party carries a dungeon map, bought in town or found in the labyrinth, or has cast a mapping spell; GameSpot's review stated that the game "lacks an automap feature" and advised players to map by hand.

== Plot ==
The game is set in a world created by the god Avrul, whose first creations, the Draguun, bore the blood of dragon gods and built a powerful magical civilization before destroying themselves. Long after their fall, monsters sealed away in the distant past have begun to return, and adventurers descend into the labyrinths in search of Draguun relics and monster bounties. Reviewers noted that the narrative is slight and largely separate from the dungeon crawling itself, with brief individual episodes attached to the pre-set characters and self-contained quests taken from the guild.

== Development and release ==
Labyrinth of Lost Souls was produced as part of "Wizardry Renaissance", a Japanese initiative to revive the Wizardry brand with new licensed titles. By this point the series trademark was held in Japan rather than by its original American owner, having passed from Sir-Tech through a succession of Japanese rights holders; the trademark was later acquired by Drecom.

The game was released on the Japanese PlayStation Network on December 9, 2009, and later received a Japanese retail release. Xseed Games announced on March 23, 2011 that it would bring the game to the West as a PlayStation Network download. The North American release followed in June 2011, with Xseed confirming its availability on the PlayStation Blog on June 3. The European release came on December 7, 2011.

An iOS version was released in Japan on July 29, 2011 and worldwide on November 3, 2011, offered as a free download with the full game unlocked by an in-app purchase. A PlayStation Vita version was released in Japan on December 3, 2015 as a download-only title.

A Microsoft Windows version was announced for release via Steam on May 29, 2019, but on the day of its planned launch Xseed announced that the game could not be released as scheduled because of unforeseen intellectual property licensing issues. The Windows version was eventually released on January 15, 2020, bundling the previously released downloadable content and adding improved visuals and a turbo mode.

== Reception ==
Reception

Aggregate scores
Aggregator	Score
GameRankings	(PS3) 3/5
Metacritic	(iOS) 62/100 (PC) 61/100 (PS3) 57/100

Review scores
Publication	Score
GameSpot	(PS3) 7.5/10
IGN	(PS3) 5.5/10
GamePro	(PS3) 3.5/5
Gamezebo	(iOS) 2.5/5
Pocket Gamer	(iOS) 3.5/5
RPGFan	(iOS) 71/100 (PC) 56/100
Shacknews	(PC) 5/10
TouchArcade	(iOS) 3.5/5
PlayStation: The Official Magazine	(PS3) 5/10
PlayStation Official Magazine – UK	(PS3) 4/10

The game received "mixed" reviews on all platforms according to the review aggregation website Metacritic.

IGN criticized the PlayStation 3 version for making players put in large amounts of work and not rewarding them enough. GameSpot criticized the same console version's old fashioned design and its handling of mapping, but praised its challenging and addictive combat. GamePro said, "Ultimately, 'Lost Souls' will reward masochists and scare off anyone intimidated by the slightest bit of a learning curve. There's a great challenge in store, but it doesn't pull any punches or make any apologies." Writing for GamesRadar+, Heidi Kemps felt the game applied only a new coat of paint to old-fashioned design and suggested newcomers to the genre start elsewhere.

Reviews of the iOS version were more favourable but still divided. Pocket Gamer praised the character development, artwork and music while criticizing the interface and the way inventory and money are tracked separately for each character. Gamezebo found the small text and absence of any tutorial a barrier. TouchArcade noted that the port was very close to the PlayStation 3 release, though its artwork suffered on smaller screens. RPGFan called it competent but lacking charm.

The 2020 Windows release drew similar comments. Shacknews described its dungeon crawling and combat as repetitive, broken up mainly by episodes of severe bad luck. RPGFan praised the nostalgia and artwork but criticized the dated presentation and the absence of story or direction.
