= Wizardry III: Legacy of Llylgamyn =

1983 video game

- Developer: Sir-Tech
- Publisher: Sir-Tech
- Designers: Andrew C. Greenberg; Robert Woodhead; Robert Del Favero Jr. Joshua Mittleman; Samuel Pottle
- Series: Wizardry
- Platforms: Apple II, Commodore 64 / 128, MS-DOS, FM-7, Game Boy Color, MSX2, NES, IBM PC, NEC PC-88, NEC PC-98, Sharp X1
- Release: 1983
- Genre: Role-playing
- Mode: Single-player

Wizardry III: Legacy of Llylgamyn (originally known as Wizardry: Legacy of Llylgamyn - The Third Scenario) is the third scenario in the Wizardry series of role-playing video games. It was published in 1983 by Sir-Tech.

== Plot ==
The City of Llylgamyn is threatened by the violent forces of nature. Earthquakes and volcanic rumblings endanger everyone. Only by seeking the dragon L'Kbreth can the city be saved.

== Gameplay ==
Legacy of Llylgamyn is another six-level dungeon crawl, although the dungeon is a volcano so the party journeys upwards rather than downwards. The gameplay and the spells are identical to the first two scenarios. Parties of up to six characters can adventure at one time.

Characters have to be imported from either Wizardry: Proving Grounds of the Mad Overlord or Wizardry II: The Knight of Diamonds. However, since the game is set years later, the characters are actually the descendants of the original characters. They keep the same name and class, can select a new alignment (class permitting), and are reset to level one.

== Development ==
Wizardry III is the first adventure game with a window manager, released before the first games on the Macintosh. The game was delayed by a year for using the technology. Llylgamyn was originally a typo, it was supposed to be spelled with only one L.

== Reception ==
Softline in 1983 praised Llylgamyn, stating that it "wasn't written; it was composed ... The dungeon feels like a living, breathing entity", and concluding that the game "is the best Wizardry yet".

Robert Reams reviewed the game for Computer Gaming World, and stated that "The Legacy of Llylgamyn is an example of the maturing and improvement of an already excellent product. This new adventure will challenge all who accept this quest and will leave you looking for the two sequels which follow in its path."

Philip L. Wing reviewed Legacy of Llylgamyn in The Space Gamer No. 72. Wing commented that "Wizardry III: Legacy of Llylgamyn is the best scenario of the series yet. It has a solid story, with riddles, appropriate to the scenario. This game is recommended for those who have the original, but characters with solid stats from the first two games are required."

In 1984 Softline readers named the game the second most-popular Apple program of 1983, behind Lode Runner. Computer Gaming World's Scorpia in 1991 and 1993 called the game "Wizardry I all over again, with a few bells and whistles added". She stated that other than the novelty of playing two separate groups of adventurers, one good and one evil, "there is little to distinguish it from the previous two games".
