= Galactic Attack =

1980 video game

- Developer: Siro-Tech
- Publisher: Siro-Tech
- Designer: Robert Woodhead
- Platform: Apple II
- Release: 1980
- Genre: Space combat simulator
- Mode: Single-player

Galactic Attack is a 1980 space combat simulator video game written by Robert Woodhead for the Apple II and published by the company he co-founded, Siro-Tech. It is a single-player adaptation of the game Empire from the PLATO mainframe network.

Siro-Tech was renamed to Sir-Tech and followed-up Galactic Attack with the more commercially successful Wizardry which was inspired by the PLATO system dungeon crawl games Oubliette and Moria.

== Gameplay ==
In Galactic Attack, the player's job is to liberate the Solar System from the dreaded Kazanta invaders by destroying the Kzanta's ships and bombarding the Kzanta's forces on the planets of the solar system and then beaming down armies to secure the planets. The game's framing uses the same loose Star Trek framing as Empire; the universe is two dimensional, with the user's starship placed in the center of their tactical screen. Ships have phasers which fire in a cone, with damage proportionate to distance, a limited number of torpedoes that can be in flight at any given time and which proceed in a straight line until they hit a target or time out, deflector shields, a range of warp speeds, and a limited energy supply that slowly automatically regenerates. Weapons were fired on compass bearings by typing in degree headings.

== Development ==
Galactic Attack was written with UCSD Pascal.

== Reception ==
Bruce F. Webster reviewed Galactic Attack in The Space Gamer No. 43. Webster commented that "I recommend Galactic Attack with few reservations. If gives you far more for your money than a lot of other games costing the same. Because the difficulty level can be adjusted to a very high point, it will be a long time before you master this game".

Dick Richards reviewed the game for Computer Gaming World, stating that "As this is a real time game, it demands quick thinking — indecision can be fatal — because the computer controlled Kzinti never hesitates".
