= Grimoire: Heralds of the Winged Exemplar =

2017 dungeon-crawling role-playing video game

- Developer: Golden Era Games
- Publisher: Golden Era Games
- Designer: Cleveland Mark Blakemore
- Platform: Microsoft Windows
- Release: WW: August 4, 2017
- Genre: Role-playing Dungeon Crawl
- Mode: Single-player

Grimoire: Heralds of the Winged Exemplar is a dungeon-crawling role-playing video game developed by Australian studio Golden Era Games. The game was released for Windows on August 4, 2017, and features forming a full-sized party and turn-based combat, with a fantasy style with influences from other genres.

== Plot ==
Grimoire: Heralds of the Winged Exemplar is set in a fantasy world entitled Hyperborea, guarded by a powerful creature known as the White Owl (also known as the "Winged Exemplar", hence the game's subtitle). The White Owl has set up a clock, named the "Metronome Mysterium", to promote peace and tranquility throughout Hyperborea, which had been plagued by conflict before the implementation of the clock. Knowledge of the Metronome Mysterium's location on nine hidden tablets, but the White Owl soon forgot the location of them. As the clock began to count down and unwind, the player is required to locate the nine tablets in order to restore the state of peace Hyperborea was once in.

== Gameplay ==
Screenshot

Grimoire is a dungeon-crawling role-playing video game played from a first-person perspective. The game features turn-based tactical combat with gameplay patterned closely after Wizardry 6 and Wizardry 7. In the game, the player controls up to 8 party members. Intense difficulty is also a key feature of gameplay, along with the aforementioned "old-school" nature; the game includes 2D graphics and MIDI music by composer Ellsworth Hall. The game world is divided into tiles which the player can move between, with a camera view pointing in the four cardinal directions. Grimoire features an in-game map with an auto-walking option.

Gameplay consists of a combination of exploration, puzzle solving and combat. Characters within the party gain experience for defeating enemies, allowing them to increase in level, learn new magic spells and improve their skills. New equipment and quest items are obtained through exploration and purchased in shops or from friendly characters. The game offers over 1000 different items, 240 different enemies and 144 context sensitive magic spells.

In Grimoire, it is possible to create your own party from 15 different professions and 14 different races. In addition, out of the 64 friendly characters encountered during the game, about 25 can be recruited into one's own party of up to 8 members. The player can choose between five different beginnings and can adjust the combat difficulty level throughout the game.

== Development ==
Grimoire: Heralds of the Winged Exemplar was created by Cleveland Mark Blakemore. Blakemore, a programmer by trade, had previously worked for Sir-Tech, the publishers of the popular Wizardry computer role-playing game series. After the release of the seventh game in the series, Wizardry 7, Sir-Tech outsourced their development to an Australian company Directsoft with the intent to create a sequel, known as Wizardry: Stones of Arnhem. Due to the lack of progress by the game's team run by Australian actor Max Phipps, Blakemore was hired as a consultant. However, he alleged that he was unable to bring the rest of the team into line, and resigned. Stones of Arnhem was eventually cancelled; distraught at Sir-Tech by their alleged failure to create an effective work environment, he started work on Grimoire shortly after the cancellation of Stones of Arnhem. Traditionally, gaming historians have treated Blakemore's version of events with skepticism, but the appearance of Sir-Tech's documents on auction at eBay has shed new light on Blakemore's involvement with the company.

Since the game's 1997 announcement and 1998 beta testing, there have been many release dates announced and updates provided. One of the first was provided by a preview in October 1997 issue of Computer Gaming World, which claimed the game would be released later that year. In 2013, Blakemore launched an Indiegogo crowdfunding drive, which failed to meet its goal, only raising $10,598 out of a goal of $250,000; the campaign promised a release later that year. In 2017, the game was launched on Steam Greenlight pending a release sometime later that year. The release date was eventually announced as July 7, but the game failed to be released that day. The game was eventually released on August 4; Blakemore announced that "After more than 20 years of development, the greatest roleplaying game of them all is finally ready for release!" After its release, Golden Era Games pledged to support the game with more patches and features.

As of January 2019, the manual for the game has been released. The game also saw the inclusion of new content, new mechanics (bigger inventory screen, enchanting, the spirit bar, etc.) and numerous bug fixes since its release. A music soundtrack album has been prepared by composer Ellsworth Hall for future release, adapting the original MIDI compositions into full-blown audio orchestrations.

== Reception ==
Reception

Review score
| Publication | Score |
|---|---|
| GameStar | 30/100 |

GameStar reviewer Sascha Penzhorn criticizes the outdated graphics and sound of the game, but notes that with the inclusion of missing features, a manual, as well as adjustments to the user interface and the game balance, Grimoire could become "a really good oldschool RPG". In summary, he states that currently the game is "unfinished, broken, hostile to its users and is being offered at full price", awarding it a score of 30/100.

Rock, Paper, Shotgun writer Alec Meer states in an article that he admires the size of the game and the dedication behind it, noting that "the labour of love is clear". However, he also harshly criticizes the slow combat, the "desperately cumbersome" user interface and the sound. His conclusion: "I like Grimoire in many ways, but again, I would need to truly, madly, deeply love it in order to endure all that. I'm afraid that I do not."

Writing for Motherboard, Leif Johnson concludes that even though Grimoire fills a niche that has not been filled for a while, personally he does not "have time for this kind of punishment anymore."

GameBanshee reviewed the expanded V2 of Grimoire in February 2019, writing that "with its steep learning curve, complexity and lack of eye candy" it is difficult to recommend Grimoire to any newcomers to the genre. However, if you have experience with the genre and "are interested in going on a grand adventure where you have to use your head, then Grimoire is the game for you."

RPG Codex polled Grimoire at #22 out of the "Top 101 RPGs of all time for 2019," citing its deep gameplay, richly developed setting and challenging turn-based combat. It was notable as being one of the few games in the top 25 that was developed largely by a single person using their own resources in their spare time, whereas the other games at the top of the list were produced by game companies with very large teams and production budgets.
