= Citadel of the Dead =

1994 video game

- Developer(s): Ryan Best
- Publisher(s): Affiliate Venture Publishing
- Platform(s): Macintosh
- Release: 1994

Citadel of the Dead is a computer game developed by RJBest. It was distributed by Affiliate Venture Publishing in 1994 for Macintosh.

== Plot ==
Main gameplay screen

Citadel of the Dead is a first-person fantasy role-playing game. The game features multiple character classes, including the samurai, magician, and cleric.

== Reception ==
Comparing it to Wizardry I, Computer Gaming World in April 1994 said of Citadel of the Dead that "For those seeking instant dungeon gratification at reasonable prices, a new gauntlet has been hurled". The game was reviewed in 1995 in Dragon #219 by Jay & Dee in the "Eye of the Monitor" column, where both reviewers gave the game zero stars.

== Reviews ==
- Electronic Games
