= Star Saga One: Beyond the Boundary =

1988 video game

Star Saga
- Developer: Masterplay Publishing
- Publisher: Masterplay Publishing
- Designers: Andrew C. Greenberg; Rick Dutton; Walter Freitag; Michael Massimilla
- Platforms: Apple IIGS, Apple II, MS-DOS
- Release: 1988
- Genres: Adventure, role-playing

Star Saga One: Beyond the Boundary is the first game in the Star Saga series. It was published in 1988 by Masterplay.

== Gameplay ==
Star Saga: One - Beyond The Boundary, released in 1988, was the first in a short-lived series of science fiction adventure/role-playing games by Masterplay Publishing. Loosely based on the Rekon pen & paper role-playing system, the game series was designed by Andrew C. Greenberg (co-creator of Wizardry), Rick Dutton, Walter Freitag, and Michael Massimilla. In this first title, players leave their homeworlds setting out to explore the vast unknowns of space.

The game includes 13 manuals, 6 character booklets, 2 maps, and a reference guide.

== Reception ==
Star Saga was hailed as being completely new and different from games which came before. The Computer Gaming World review of the first title summarizes this sentiment as "Star Saga: One - Beyond the Boundary is probably the most unique and well-written role-playing experience yet to appear in a computer game". The same reviewer noted that it was easy to lose track of time playing "just one more turn" due to the deep experiences provided by the game. In 1989 the magazine gave Star Saga One a Special Award for Literary Achievement. Compute! was less favorable, describing the game as "far more a social event than a computer game". The magazine stated that "it's lackluster without interaction" with other players, and described the user interface as "almost crude by today's standards". Star Saga One: Beyond the Boundary was reviewed in 1989 in Dragon #142 by Hartley, Patricia, and Kirk Lesser in "The Role of Computers" column. The reviewers gave the game 3 1/2 out of 5 stars. Tony Watson reviewed Star Saga: One - Beyond the Boundary in Space Gamer/Fantasy Gamer No. 84. Watson commented that "Through imaginative writing, an appreciation of SF, and an appropriate sense of humor (and Will McLean's illustrations help too), the designers have made the paragraph system work. Star Saga: One is simply a lot of fun ."

Jeff Donahue for Family Computing said "Star Saga is light-years ahead of the "which-way" adventures."
