= Fuzzball =

Fuzzball may refer to:

- Fuzzball (sport), a variation of baseball similar to stickball
- Fuzzball (string theory), an alternative quantum description of black holes
- Fuzzball router, the first modern routers on the Internet
- Fuzzball, a cartoon appearing in the TV series KaBlam!
- Fuzzball, the playable character in the 1990 video game Freakin' Funky Fuzzballs
- Pill (textile), a small ball of fibers that forms on a piece of cloth

== See also ==
- Fussball (disambiguation)
- Fuzzball MUCK, a 1995 online text-based role-playing game
