= Wizardry 8 =

2001 video game

- Developer: Sir-Tech Canada
- Publishers: Sir-Tech; Night Dive Studios (digital)
- Producer: Linda Currie
- Designers: Brenda Romero; Linda Currie; Alex Meduna; Charles Miles
- Programmers: Derek Beland; Alex Meduna
- Artists: Kristofer Eggleston; James Ferris
- Writer: Brenda Romero
- Composer: Kevin Manthei
- Series: Wizardry
- Engine: SurRender 3D
- Platform: Windows
- Release: NA: November 15, 2001
- Genre: Role-playing video game
- Mode: Single-player

Wizardry 8 is the last installment in the Wizardry series of role-playing video games developed by Sir-Tech Canada. Serving as the third game in the "Dark Savant trilogy," it follows Wizardry VI: Bane of the Cosmic Forge and Wizardry VII: Crusaders of the Dark Savant. Originally published in 2001 by Sir-Tech, it was re-released by Night Dive Studios on GOG.com and Steam in 2013.

== Story ==
In Wizardry 8, the objective is to gather artifacts and place them on a pedestal located in the final zone of the game. This action enables the player to ascend to the Cosmic Circle, where they have the opportunity to attain godhood.

=== Beginnings ===
Wizardry 8 offers five potential starting points that build upon the various endings of the preceding games by the same producers. In the concluding section of Wizardry VII, players are faced with the decision of disclosing to their companion whether they possess a means of departing the planet Guardia. Opting for honesty grants access to the Girl and Globe endings, while choosing to deceive leads to the availability of the Umpani, T'Rang, and Globe endings.

=== Main Story ===
Although the specific details of the player's entry into the game world are unclear, the objective remains to locate the necessary artifacts for the purpose of achieving godhood. The player must acquire the keys to life, knowledge, and change.

Once in possession of these artifacts, the player proceeds to Ascension Peak, initiating the journey towards becoming a deity. Upon reaching the castle and assuming the role of Rapax Templars, access to the Peak is granted.

Within the Cosmic Circle, the Dark Savant is already present and engaged in conversation with Aletheides, the cyborg whom the party either aligns with or follows to planet Guardia in Wizardry VII, depending on their choices in Wizardry VI. In a fit of rage, the Dark Savant kills Aletheides. As the player approaches, they discover that the Cosmic Forge has returned to its rightful place in the Circle, the theft of which is detailed in Wizardry VI.

The Dark Savant unveils himself to the player as Phoonzang, the enigmatic deity figure featured in both Wizardry VII and 8, and a former Cosmic Lord. He was cast out by the other cosmic lords for attempting to bestow universal knowledge upon mortals such as humans, T'Rang, and elves. To prolong his life beyond that of an ordinary man, he was compelled to merge with machinery. He then extends an invitation to the party, offering them the opportunity to join him and become cosmic lords alongside him.

=== Endings ===
At this juncture, the player is faced with three choices that result in different outcomes:

1. The "Savant" ending: The player's party aligns with the Dark Savant. They are compelled to eliminate Bela and, if present, Vi. Subsequently, the party and the savant utilize the cosmic forge to script the fate of the universe. However, this destiny is malicious in nature, as explained by the narrator. The Savant derives great satisfaction from inciting violent and perpetual conflicts among various alien races. The game concludes with the narrator emphasizing the alignment of the player and their party with the Dark Savant's malevolence.
2. The "Pen" ending: The party chooses to employ the Cosmic Forge to erase the Dark Savant from existence and restore Phoonzang. However, they are not swift enough and must ultimately defeat the Savant or Phoonzang. Fortunately, the universe is ultimately saved, and the player's party ascends to the role of guardians, overseeing its destiny as benevolent deities. They engage in noble acts such as fostering everlasting peace between the Umpani and the T'rang (assuming both races survive the events of the game) and instilling kindness and empathy in the Rapax, thus transforming them into a more civilized race and quelling their aspirations for world dominance.
3. The "Book" ending: The player opts to tear out the page in the book of destiny where Phoonzang transforms into the Savant, inadvertently altering or obliterating subsequent pages. As the cosmic forge's magic takes time to manifest, the party is compelled to engage in a deadly confrontation with the savant. By removing the page, the savant reverts back to Phoonzang, alive and well. However, the act of tearing out numerous pages causes the eradication of multiple events, leading Phoonzang to reveal that the party has effectively destroyed the universe. At this point, the party ascends and, with Phoonzang's assistance, embarks on the challenging task of restoring the universe's history to correct the timeline once more.

== Gameplay ==
In Wizardry 8, the player has the opportunity to form a party of six adventurers at the beginning of the game. Each race and class possesses a combination of strengths and weaknesses. The design of the various races and classes aims to maintain balance, enabling a wide range of playable party compositions. Characters have the ability to change their class as they progress, allowing for diverse combinations.

The game is experienced from a first-person perspective, with fluid movement replacing the grid-based movement of previous Wizardry games. A notable improvement introduced in Wizardry 8 is the visibility of approaching enemies, eliminating the sudden appearance of foes. Combat takes place in a turn-based manner, although players can choose to activate a continuous-phase mode. Monsters are adjusted in difficulty according to the party's level, ensuring that higher-level parties face distinct sets of monsters compared to lower-level parties in the same area. However, the scaling of difficulty is constrained to provide variation.

Wizardry 8 employs a different set of statistics compared to its predecessors, requiring conversions from the previous upper limit of 18 to the new upper limit of 100.

For players seeking a more challenging experience, Sir-Tech reintroduced the "Iron Man Mode" option, reminiscent of the rules used in early Wizardry games. In this "permadeath" mode, players are unable to manually save the game; instead, the game is automatically saved upon quitting.

Numerous hidden areas, including "retro dungeons" reminiscent of the dungeons in Proving Grounds of the Mad Overlord, are scattered throughout the game. These areas present a traditional grid-based dungeon design, featuring obstacles such as spinners, traps, and teleporters.

== Development ==
Wizardry 8 was released approximately nine years after its predecessor, Wizardry VII: Crusaders of the Dark Savant, which came out in 1992. It arrived five years after the completion of Wizardry VII's Windows 95 version, known as Wizardry Gold, in 1996.

While David W. Bradley had served as the chief designer for Wizardry VI and VII, he was not involved in the design of Wizardry 8. Following Bradley's departure, Sir-Tech, the publisher, entrusted the development of Wizardry 8: Stones of Arnhem to DirectSoft, their distributor in Australia. This team comprised programmer Cleveland Blakemore (known for Grimoire: Heralds of the Winged Exemplar) and actor Max Phipps. However, this collaboration was unsuccessful, leading to the dissolution of Directsoft. Consequently, the project was relaunched entirely under the direction of Sir-Tech Canada. Linda Currie is credited as the producer of Wizardry 8, while Brenda Romero served as the game's lead designer.

Despite a "final save" option after the concluding battle, Sir-Tech announced that they had no intentions of creating a sequel. The company ceased operations in 2003.

Notwithstanding the closure of the development studio, Sir-Tech continued to offer support and release several patches and updates for Wizardry 8 for years after its release. This support was made possible thanks to the collective efforts of the Wizardry 8 developers, who volunteered their time. Fans of the series have also contributed to these efforts by providing editors, moderators, and game-related information.

== Reception ==
Reception

Aggregate score
Aggregator	Score
Metacritic	85/100

Review scores
Publication	Score
AllGame	4.5/5
Computer Gaming World	5/5
GameSpot	9.1/10
GameSpy	88%
GameZone	8.5/10
IGN	7.5/10
PC Gamer (US)	89%
X-Play	3/5
The Cincinnati Enquirer	3.5/5

Wizardry 8 garnered "generally favorable" reviews according to the review aggregation website Metacritic.

In 2017, Wizardry 8 were ranked #99 in IGN's "Top 100 RPGs of All Time" list. Chris Reed of IGN, more than a decade after the game's initial launch, commended its character creation tools and party system. He highlighted the remarkable variety of combinations available to players when forming their party.

=== Awards ===
Wizardry 8 received recognition as the best computer role-playing game of 2001 from Computer Gaming World, GameSpot, and Computer Games Magazine (tied with Arcanum: Of Steamworks and Magick Obscura). RPG Vault, The Electric Playground, GameSpy and the Academy of Interactive Arts & Sciences nominated Wizardry 8 for the "PC Role-Playing" honors, although the awards were ultimately given to Dark Age of Camelot, Arcanum, and Baldur's Gate II: Throne of Bhaal. However, Wizardry 8 did win RPG Vault's "Outstanding Achievement in Music" and "Lifetime Achievement Award" prizes. It was also ranked as the tenth-best computer game overall by GameSpot.

Computer Gaming World editors praised Wizardry 8 as "an awesome achievement" and an unapologetically hardcore labor of love created by experienced game developers. Computer Games Magazine hailed it as "Sir-Tech's opus" and the finest party-based loot-gathering dungeon crawl since Crusaders of the Dark Savant.

The game had also received additional accolades, including the title of Best Single Player RPG and Best Sound in an RPG of 2001 from RPGDot. It was awarded the Editor's Choice Award by ActionTrip and GamePen.

== General references ==
- Wizardry 8 Official strategies & secrets, Mark H. Walker, SYBEX, Inc. (2001). ISBN 0-7821-2466-6
