= Wizardry II: The Knight of Diamonds =

1982 video game

- Developer: Sir-Tech
- Publisher: Sir-Tech
- Designers: Andrew C. Greenberg; Robert Woodhead
- Series: Wizardry
- Platforms: Apple II, Commodore 64 / 128, MS-DOS, FM-7, Game Boy Color, Mac, MSX2, NES, PC-88, PC-98, TurboGrafx-CD, Sharp X1
- Release: 1982
- Genre: Role-playing
- Mode: Single-player

Wizardry II: The Knight of Diamonds (originally known as Wizardry: Knight of Diamonds - The Second Scenario) is the second game in the Wizardry series of role-playing video games. It was published in 1982 by Sir-Tech.

== Gameplay ==
The game begins with the city of Llylgamyn under siege. Llylgamyn's rulers have been killed, and the city's only hope is for the recovery of the staff of Gnilda, only obtainable from trading the mystic "Knight of Diamonds" armor from the legendary Knight of Diamonds to fend off the invaders.

Title screen

The game functions virtually identically to the first scenario, Wizardry: Proving Grounds of the Mad Overlord, with the player guiding a party of up to six adventurers into a six-level dungeon. The original version required players to import characters from the first game, whilst later versions include a pre-generated party and the ability to create new characters. As the game is intended to be played by those who have successfully completed the first game, the difficulty level is intended for characters of at least level 13, and no training area means that lower level characters will go through a "baptism by fire". Mechanical differences include the ability to save the game in the dungeon rather than forcing the characters to exit the dungeon and return to the training grounds, and some of the spells increasing in power (as noted by a message in the dungeon).

Unlike the first scenario, where half of the levels had no purpose plot-wise and could be skipped if the player wished, exploring every level in Knight of Diamonds is necessary to complete the game. Each of the six levels has a piece of the Knight's armor somewhere in the level, and all of the pieces must be collected in order to finish the game. Furthermore, unlike in the first scenario, there are no elevators that can be used to skip levels.

== Reception ==
Softline in 1982 praised Knight of Diamonds' variety of monsters and liked that each level of the dungeon had quests. The magazine concluded, "One can only wonder what this amazing duo of Greenberg and Woodhead will do for the next scenario". Computer Gaming World in 1991 and 1993 called Wizardry II a "disappointingly weak follow-up", criticizing its small size and noting that the first game was necessary to play. The magazine concluded that it was "best for the hard-core fan only".

Philip L. Wing reviewed Knight of Diamonds in Space Gamer No. 76. Wing commented that "I recommend this scenario. This is an interesting and challenging adventure for higher-level Wizardry characters."

Knight of Diamonds was named "Best Adventure Game for Home Computer" at the 1982 Origins Game Fair, defeating Ultima II among other nominees. It also received a Certificate of Merit in the category of "1984 Best Computer Adventure" at the 5th annual Arkie Awards.

Lisa Stevens reviewed the Macintosh version of Wizardry: Knight of Diamonds in White Wolf #26 (April/May, 1991), rating it a 3 out of 5 and stated that

Overall, if you are used to the more sophisticated roleplaying games available for the IBM and other computer systems which cater to game playing, then you will be disappointed with Wizardry and Knight of Diamonds. There's just not enough diversity. What there is is done well, but I found myself getting bored as the game progressed.
