= Deep Space: Operation Copernicus =

1987 video game

- Publisher: Sir-Tech
- Platforms: Apple II, Commodore 64, MS-DOS
- Release: 1987

Deep Space: Operation Copernicus is a video game published in 1988 by Sir-Tech.

== Gameplay ==
Deep Space: Operation Copernicus is a game in which the player must use a Katani class ship to eliminate Andromedan warships that have invaded United Planets territory.

== Reception ==
David M. Wilson reviewed the game for Computer Gaming World, and stated that "If the game's slow pacing doesn't put the player off initially, the game will give players a competitive run for their money and much potential 'bang for the buck' as the game progresses".
