= Fussball =

Fussball or Fußball (if the German letter ß is used) may refer to:

- Table football, also known as foosball, a custom-table game loosely based on association football with figures on rods representing the players
- The German name for football (or soccer)

== See also ==
- Football in Germany
- Fuzzball (disambiguation)
