= Star Maze =

1982 video game

- Developer(s): Eastman Computing
- Publisher(s): Sir-Tech
- Designer(s): Robert Woodhead
- Programmer(s): Gordon Eastman
- Platform(s): Apple II, Atari 8-bit, Commodore 64
- Release: 1982: Apple; 1983: Atari, C64
- Genre(s): Multidirectional shooter
- Mode(s): Single-player

Star Maze is a space-themed shooter taking place in a multidirectional scrolling maze published by Sir-Tech in 1982. It was written by Canadian programmer Gordon Eastman for the Apple II, based on a design by Robert Woodhead. Versions for the Atari 8-bit computers and Commodore 64 followed in 1983.

== Gameplay ==
The object of Star Maze is to collect the nine jewels in a large, randomly generated, maze-like structure.

The player flies through the maze in a spaceship that looks and controls like the ship from Atari, Inc.'s Asteroids arcade game. One button applies thrust, the other button shoots in the direction the ship is pointing. The joystick orients the ship. A hyperspace key drops the ship in a random location in the maze, and a finite number of antimatter bombs destroy all visible enemies. Unlike Asteroids, the ship has limited fuel, and the hyperspace option uses a significant amount of it. A jewel can only be collected it the ship's speed is below a certain threshold, then the jewel can be flown to the mothership in exchange for additional fuel.

Completing a maze gives a bonus based on how much time it took. There are 16 levels.

== Development ==
According to a 1983 article in TODAY magazine, Star Maze took ten months of weekends to create.

== Reception ==
Russell Sipe reviewed the game for Computer Gaming World, and stated that "Star Maze is a well-designed game that should provide you with many hours of enjoyable game playing." Apple magazine Peelings II gave an "A" grade, but noted that the mazes all feel similar and sometimes a new ship is destroyed by an enemy or rock immediately after starting out.

Electronic Games was impressed with the visuals and called Star Maze, "a totally fascinating space epic worthy of every Apple-gamer's attention." Arcade Express pointed out the difficulty of the control scheme, but called it "so fascinating and varied in its play-action that it overcomes any such learning difficulties with ease," giving a 10/10 score. Computer and Video Games scored Star Maze a 10 for playability, with the reviewer writing, "Once I mastered the controls the game became more and more fascinating and I can confidently recommend it as one of the best games now on sale for the Apple."

The reviewer for Creative Computing found the controls difficult to manage:

In keyboard mode, ten keys are in use, although only six are used regularly. That's too many for my uncoordinated fingers. Regular joystick mode is somewhat easier, although you still need the keyboard to detonate antimatter bombs or enter hyperspace. But perhaps I am just being petulant because I was never able even to come close to mastering the game.

== See also ==
- Bolo, another Apple II multidirectional shooter in a large maze
