= Nemesis: The Wizardry Adventure =

1996 video game

- Developer: Sir-Tech
- Publishers: NA: Sir-Tech; PAL: Virgin Interactive Entertainment; JP: Shouei
- Director: Linda Currie
- Programmers: Derek Beland; Bret Rowdon
- Writers: Linda Currie; Brenda Brathwaite
- Composer: Eric Heberling
- Series: Wizardry
- Platforms: MS-DOS, Saturn, Windows
- Release: MS-DOS: NA: October 17, 1996; EU: 1996; Saturn: JP: January 22, 1998; Windows: JP: 1998
- Genres: Adventure, role-playing
- Mode: Single-player

Nemesis: The Wizardry Adventure is a 1996 adventure and role-playing video game developed and published by Sir-Tech. It is a spin-off of the Wizardry series of games. Originally for MS-DOS, ports to Saturn and Windows were released in Japan in 1998.

== Gameplay ==
Nemesis features hybrid gameplay, with both puzzle-solving and role-playing elements to the adventure. Gameplay is in first person, and uses point and click mechanics for dialog, puzzle-solving, and environment interaction. The player begins with pre-set statistics, but weapon skills can be improved through combat use of a weapon and the player also learns magical spells throughout the game. Combat in the game is in real time, and involves clicking to target the enemy after selecting commands.

== Development ==
Nemesis was developed by Sir-Tech and conceived by director Linda Currie, the younger sister of company founders Rob and Norm Sirotek. Currie had worked at the company for many years, most recently as the producer of Jagged Alliance. Speaking to PC Gamer US in 1995, Currie explained that Nemesis was designed as an adventure/role-playing hybrid that was "not [...] intimidating or complex." Its controls were simplified, and she compared its design to that of Myst, but with a greater emphasis on action and conversation. Like Myst, Nemesis also features pre-rendered 3D graphics. Currie said that the team hoped to provide "the enjoyment of adventure but the conflict of a combat game." According to PC Gamer's T. Liam McDonald, Nemesis was an attempt by Sir-Tech to engage the era's influx of new computer game players, many of whom were unfamiliar with the Wizardry license. However, instead of making the game part of the series' canon, Sir-Tech created an original setting meant to retain only what Currie called "the qualities that Wizardry stands for: an epic story, intrigue, mystery, and arsenals of unique items."

In contrast to previous Wizardry titles, the designers chose to make Nemesis a real-time game. Matching real-time combat and enemy movement with "step-based" player motion was a challenge for the team. In addition, Currie explained that combat speed had to be paced to give players time to react to enemy attacks. She told PC Gamer that she wanted Nemesis to offer strategic options, despite its real-time nature, to grant the player an opportunity "for something more than click-click-click." Sir-Tech showed the game at the 1996 Electronic Entertainment Expo (E3) in June, alongside Realms of Arkania: Shadows over Riva. In the July 1996 issue of PC Magazine, writer Michael E. Ryan reported that Nemesis was planned for a September release. It was ultimately released on October 17, 1996.

== Reception ==
Reception

Review scores
Publication	Score
GameSpot	7.4/10
Next Generation	3/5
PC Gamer (UK)	45%
PC Gamer (US)	73%
PC Zone	65/100
PC Magazine	3/5
PC Games	B−

Writing for PC Gamer US, Michael Wolf summarized Nemesis as "a decent graphic adventure, but if you're dying to play more Wizardry games, you're bound to be disappointed." A Next Generation critic agreed that the developers were "riding the Wizardry wave of success, and to some extent betraying it" with Nemesis. He acknowledged that some of the puzzles were quite inventive, but felt too many were impossible to solve unaided, and found the dungeon crawl more of a drawn-out slog than previous Wizardry games. Scorpia of Computer Gaming World found the game to be "mediocre at best" and "a disappointing experience." Writing for GameSpot, T. Liam McDonald described Nemesis as "a straight adventure game with some modest combat and spell casting for beginning to intermediate gamers. [Taken a]s such, it's quite a handsome one."

PC Gamer UK's Matthew Pierce wrote that Nemesis is "all well and good as a premise, but the game [Sir-Tech] have created must go down as one of the most user-unfriendly games ever." In PC Zone, Charlie Brooker called the game "one for diehard RPG fans only." However, Nicholas Petreley of InfoWorld called Nemesis "the best first-person role-playing game of its kind to come along in years", and praised its puzzle design.

Reviewing the game for PC Magazine, Shane Mooney wrote, "Those expecting an RPG in the Wizardry tradition will be disappointed by Nemesis." However, he considered it "truly pleasant" and "solid" when taken as an adventure game.

Andy Butcher reviewed Nemesis: The Wizardry Adventure for Arcane magazine, rating it a 5 out of 10 overall, and stated that "Unfortunately, Nemesis suffers in two key areas. The first is speed unless you have a fast PC with an equally impressive CD-ROM drive, and the space to install a lot of the game on your hard disk, Nemesis can be painfully slow to play, which completely ruins the carefully-crafted visuals. Perhaps more importantly, though, the game's puzzles are in the graphic adventure style - objects have to be used at the right location in the right manner to progress. If these kind of games are your thing, you'll certainly like Nemesis. Those gamers who prefer a little more flexibility and freedom, though, will be a tad disappointed."
