= Excalibur 2555 AD =

1997 video game

- Developers: Tempest Software; Fish (UK) Ltd. (Windows)
- Publishers: EU: Telestar Electronic Studios; NA: Sir-Tech
- Platforms: PlayStation, Windows
- Release: PlayStation: UK: April 11, 1997; NA: September 1997; Windows: EU: October 1997; NA: October 20, 1997
- Genre: Action-adventure

Excalibur 2555 AD is an action-adventure game developed by Tempest Software and published by Telestar Electronic Studios in Europe and Sir-Tech in North America for the PlayStation in 1997 and ported to Windows by Fish (UK) later that year.

== Gameplay ==
Excalibur 2555 AD plays similarly to Pax Corpus, in that players roam through fully 3D environments with a female character in a futuristic setting, and collect items which can be saved for later use. The game is fully voice-acted, though there is also an option to enable subtitles. Like Pax Corpus, the game received mixed to negative reviews both having been released the same year as Tomb Raider 2.

== Plot ==
Mysterious soldiers from the future have travelled back in time to steal Excalibur from King Arthur's court. The wizard Merlin sends a young female warrior, Beth, into the future to retrieve it. With her giant sword in hand, Beth travels through a gloomy underground city, helping out the local people whenever she can.

== History ==
The game was showcased at E3 1997. In Japan, the PlayStation version was ported and published by Imagineer under the name Lost Sword: Ushinawareta Seiken (ロストソード 〜失われた聖剣〜, Rosuto Sōdo 〜Shichi Wareta Seiken〜) on March 12, 1998.

== Reception ==
Reception

Aggregate score
Aggregator	Score	
Aggregator	PC	PS
GameRankings	N/A	54%

Review scores
Publication	Score	
Publication	PC	PS
AllGame	N/A	2.5/5
Computer Games Strategy Plus	1.5/5	N/A
Computer Gaming World	1/5	N/A
Edge	N/A	6/10
Electronic Gaming Monthly	N/A	6.25/10
Famitsu	N/A	20/40
Game Informer	N/A	6.25/10
GameRevolution	D+	N/A
GameSpot	3.9/10	4.5/10
IGN	N/A	3/10
Next Generation	2/5	N/A
PlayStation Official Magazine – UK	N/A	7/10
PC Gamer (US)	52%	N/A

The game received mixed but mostly negative reviews. Critics noted that the game had been marketed as being similar to Tomb Raider, with Shawn Smith recounting in Electronic Gaming Monthly that during development the player character's design had been revised with a ponytail and super-short outfit in an apparent attempt to make her more closely resemble Tomb Raider's player character, Lara Croft. However, critics also overwhelmingly thought Excalibur 2555 A.D. fell far short of that acclaimed game, and GameSpot and Next Generation went so far as to state that the gameplay is too fundamentally different from Tomb Raider to justify any comparison at all. Criticisms varied widely, but the most common were that the gameplay is a combination of mindless combat and puzzles which amount to nothing more than repeatedly finding and trading one object for another one. GameSpot summarized that "Excalibur 2555 AD misses the mark in being either an engaging action game or an interesting puzzler. While not a horrible title by any means, it's simply boring."

Other complaints voiced by multiple reviewers were that the animations are rudimentary and the music is terrible. GamePro gave it a 3 out of 5 for graphics and 1.5 in every other category (sound, control, and fun factor), commenting, "The puzzle elements are bland and clichéd, while the battle system is complete trash: You stand toe-to-toe with your foes ... trading blows at a ridiculously slow pace, while awful techno tunes try to keep your blood pumping." IGN also razed the voice acting, while GameSpot and GameRevolution attributed the poorness of the voice tracks to low quality production. By contrast, Crispin Boyer of Electronic Gaming Monthly judged that "The graphics are pretty sharp - if not overly colorful - and the voice acting ain't bad either. Its 13 maze-like levels will hold your interest." Boyer's co-reviewer, Ken "Sushi-X" Williams, also had a relatively positive response to the game, but remarked, "Despite the huge exploration, I wonder why I can't jump, climb or look around. These simple functions, when missing, make an extremely flat game, something a 3-D title should never be."

GameSpot noted that the Windows version is a port of the PlayStation version, and criticized its lack of mid-level saving. GameRevolution found the graphical effects and level of detail when using 3D acceleration cards to be impressive, but said it did not make up for the massive plot holes and poor gameplay. Next Generation instead argued that the 3D card compatibility only serves to highlight how limited Excalibur 2555 AD is compared to leading PC games.
