= Elminage =

- Genre(s): Role-playing video games
- Publisher(s): Starfish SD
- Platform(s): PlayStation 2, Nintendo DS, PlayStation Portable, Nintendo 3DS, Microsoft Windows

Elminage (エルミナージュ) is a series of Japanese fantasy role-playing video games published by Starfish SD since 2008. They are Dungeon Crawler RPGs in the tradition of the Wizardry series. It is one of the most well-regarded series in this genre.

== Introduction ==
The Wizardry series had a deep influence on Japanese game Role-playing game design since its introduction. There are many Wizardry-clones made by Japanese game developers in this era. The Elminage series is known for its quality and especially game-balance. The original series consists of two games, Elminage: Yami no Miko to Kamigami no Yubiwa (エルミナージュ 〜闇の巫女と神々の指輪〜) in 2008, and Elminage II: Sousei no Megami to Unmei no Daichi (エルミナージュII 〜双生の女神と運命の大地〜) in 2010.

The original release of Elminage (エルミナージュ 〜闇の巫女と神々の指輪〜) and the subsequence release Elminage II (エルミナージュII 〜双生の女神と運命の大地〜) on PlayStation Portable were well received by fans. After the development of these two games, Komiyama Daisuke (小宮山 大介), who was tasked with the series' main producing, scenario writing, monster design and game system design had been laid off the project and eventually forced to leave the company Star-fish SD. Before that he had organized a petition among the development team for the company to delay the release of the Elminage II game and provide the staff with more reasonable amount of resources for the game development.

The departure of series producer Komiyama had fans worried about the future releases, as Elminage III was already going through the last stage of development. It was eventually released on PlayStation Portable in 2011. The last release of the main series was Elminage Gothic in 2013 on Nintendo 3DS.

== Reception ==
The original release of Elminage (エルミナージュII DS Remix 〜双生の女神と運命の大地〜) had scored an A rank among 19 user reviews on the Japanese peer-review Nintendo DS ranking site ndsmk2.net, making it one of the most well-regarded games in the Role-playing game genre on the site. The direct sequel Elminage II (エルミナージュII 〜双生の女神と運命の大地〜) on PlayStation Portable had score a S rank among 34 user, averaging a score of 84 on the Japanese PSP peer-review site pspmk2.net, making it the most highly scored and ranked game in the Role-playing game genre on the site.

Elminage III (エルミナージュIII 〜暗黒の使徒と太陽の宮殿〜) was released in 2011 on PlayStation Portable and the reception was mixed. Critics praised the game's keeping of the class freedom and atmosphere, but the game balance had suffered and there are various minor polishing issues. The last release of the main series, Elminage Gothic, was released in 2013 to mixed reception. Fans had the impression that the world-view of the series was denied somewhat in that the text writing had little to no reference anymore to the past releases.

== Releases ==
The series consists of 4 games in the main series and one spin-off.

=== Main series ===
==== Elminage (エルミナージュ 〜闇の巫女と神々の指輪〜) ====
Japanese cover art of Elminage Original

Elminage: Yami no Miko to Kamigami no Yubiwa (エルミナージュ 〜闇の巫女と神々の指輪〜) (Priestess of Darkness and the Ring of the Gods) was developed by Opera House and released by Starfish SD in Japan in March 2008 for the PlayStation 2.

Elminage DS Remix: Yami no Miko to Kamigami no Yubiwa (エルミナージュ DS Remix 〜闇の巫女と神々の指輪〜) was developed by Opera House and released by Starfish SD in Japan in November 2008 for the Nintendo DS.

Elminage Original (エルミナージュ Original 〜闇の巫女と神々の指輪〜) was developed and released by Starfish SD in Japan in 2011 and by UFO Interactive Games in the United States in 2012 and in Europe in 2013 for the PlayStation Portable. It received mixed or average reviews in the West.

An enhanced HD port Elminage ORIGINAL - Priestess of Darkness and The Ring of the Gods was released onto PC via Steam on 29 November 2017 by publisher D3Publisher. It accumulated Very Positive reviews on the platform.

==== Elminage II (エルミナージュII 〜双生の女神と運命の大地〜) ====
Elminage II: Sousei no Megami to Unmei no Daichi (エルミナージュII 〜双生の女神と運命の大地〜) was developed by Opera House and released by Starfish SD in Japan in 2009 for the PlayStation Portable.

Elminage II DS Remix: Sousei no Megami to Unmei no Daichi (エルミナージュII DS Remix 〜双生の女神と運命の大地〜) was developed and released by Starfish SD in Japan in July 2010 for the Nintendo DS.

==== Elminage III (エルミナージュIII 〜暗黒の使徒と太陽の宮殿〜) ====
Elminage III: Ankoku no Shito to Taiyou no Kyuuden (エルミナージュIII 〜暗黒の使徒と太陽の宮殿〜) was developed by Opera House and released by Starfish SD in Japan in 2011 for the PlayStation Portable. It was later released on the 3DS in Japan in 2017.

==== Elminage Gothic (エルミナージュ ゴシック 〜ウルム・ザキールと闇の儀式〜) ====
Elminage Gothic: Ulm Zakir to Yami no Gishiki (エルミナージュ ゴシック 〜ウルム・ザキールと闇の儀式〜) (Ritual of Darkness and Ulm Zakir) was developed and released by Starfish SD in Japan in 2012 for the PlayStation Portable. A Windows port of this version was announced for Western release by Ghostlight in 2014 and released on September 18, 2014.

Elminage Gothic 3DS Remix: Ulm Zakir to Yami no Gishiki (エルミナージュ ゴシック 3D REMIX 〜ウルム・ザキールと闇の儀式〜) was developed by Starfish SD and released in September 2013 for the Nintendo 3DS.

=== Spin-off ===
==== Elminage Ibun (エルミナージュ異聞 アメノミハシラ) ====
Elminage Ibun: Ame no Mihashira (エルミナージュ異聞 アメノミハシラ) was developed and released by Starfish SD in Japan in 2012 for the PlayStation Portable.
