= 20th Century Trivia Challenge =

- Developer: Telstar Electronic Studios
- Publisher: Sir-Tech
- Platform: Windows
- Release: August 15, 1997
- Genre: Trivia game

20th Century Trivia Challenge is a 1997 trivia video game developed by Telstar Electronic Studios and published by Sir-Tech. It was released on August 15, 1997.

== Gameplay ==
The player answers trivia questions that are presented alongside short newsreel clips from the Pathé News archive, with the game displaying film footage that may or may not relate to the current question as the player selects from slowly revealed answer choices and proceeds through various rounds that sometimes show the correct response after a miss and sometimes do not, while additional modes allow the player to browse footage by subject or engage with simple arcade‑style interfaces involving bouncing icons or revolving circles of eggs that reveal more clips, all accompanied by a British emcee whose remarks play between questions.

== Reception ==
Reception

Review scores
Publication	Score
Computer Games Magazine	2.5/5
PC Gamer	23%
PC Games	C
Quad-City Times	1.5/4

Computer Games Magazine found the Q&A aspects of 20th Century Trivia Challenge serviceable, but found the gameplay uninteresting. PC Gamer called 20th Century Trivia Challenge a stinker.
