= Wizardry VI: Bane of the Cosmic Forge =

1990 video game

- Developer: Sir-Tech (Note: Super Famicom port was developed by Game Studio.)
- Publisher: Sir-Tech: JP: ASCII; Nightdive Studios
- Designer: David W. Bradley
- Series: Wizardry
- Platforms: Amiga, MS-DOS, Mac, FM Towns, PC-98, Super Famicom, Saturn, Linux, Windows
- Release: 1990: Amiga, MS-DOS, Mac; NA: 1990; FM Towns, PC-98; JP: December 1991; Super Famicom; JP: September 29, 1995; Sega Saturn; JP: May 31, 1996; Linux, OS X, Windows; WW: September 10, 2013
- Genre: Role-playing
- Mode: Single-player

Wizardry VI: Bane of the Cosmic Forge (originally known as Wizardry: Bane of the Cosmic Forge) is the sixth game in the Wizardry series of role-playing video games. It was the first in the trilogy surrounding the Dark Savant, which was followed by Wizardry VII: Crusaders of the Dark Savant and Wizardry 8. The game was developed by Sir-Tech and published for the Amiga and MS-DOS in 1990 by the same company. Versions for the Super Famicom, FM Towns, and PC-98 were later released in Japan by ASCII.

== Gameplay ==
Although based upon previous games in the series, David Bradley completely rewrote the system for this release. This is the first game in the series to feature full color graphics. The game is mouse-driven and ran with EGA graphics. It is also one of the few games in the Wizardry series that does not allow characters to be imported from previous games. The character creation and level-up process is more detailed than in previous releases. The player can choose from eleven races and fourteen professions. There are multiple skills divided into three categories, and magic is divided into six schools. Combat allows several different options, such as thrust or bash, depending on the weapon selected.

Wizardry VI is a first person, tile-based and menu-driven RPG. It includes many mythological creatures and people, both fictitious and those based on real life. The player may meet Sirens and Charron from Greek mythology, the Amazulu (a group of African warrior women, whose tribal name is derived from the Amazons of Greek legend, and the Zulu of Africa), and the Caterpillar from Lewis Carroll's Alice in Wonderland.

== Story ==
The player controls a party of between two and six people from numerous fantasy backgrounds, identical to those found in Wizardry VII: the Human, Elf, Dwarf, Gnome, Hobbit, Faerie, Lizard Man, Dracon (a race of half-Human, half-dragon creatures), Rawulf (a race of anthropomorphic dogs), Felpurr (a race of anthropomorphic cats) and Mook (aliens that resemble Sasquatches). They have come upon a castle that has been abandoned for over a hundred years, and which is rumored to contain the Cosmic Forge, a pen said to control the destiny of time and space. It is said that whatever is written with the pen becomes instantly true. Additionally, nobody knows what became of the King, Queen and Wizard who once lived there. Once the party enters the gates of the castle, the gates close behind them, making escape impossible.

The party visits many exotic locations. The ruins of the castle and its turrets have become overrun by creatures such as giant rats, vampire bats and carnivorous vines, and its basement has become a den of thieves, pirates and other ne'er-do-wells. Once the party finds a path through the castle and into the mountains beyond it, they meet the hostile giants and dwarves who mine the rock there, and a tribe of warrior women called the Amazulu in the jungles nearby.

In the mountains, they free the spirit of the lost Wizard, Xorphitus, who used the Cosmic Forge to learn everything there was to know in the universe. By doing so, his essence was split into two separate beings: the ghostly vision that the party meets, who seems reflective and benevolent, and his insane and violent physical self who appears much later. Xorphitus explains that this was because the nature of man was to be divided, and to know all things constituted a breach of this natural law. As such, he was naturally separated into two beings, each containing half of the universe's knowledge. He warns the party not to use the pen as he did, because using the Cosmic Forge outside of the Cosmic Circle would cause the user to suffer its Bane: to have their desire twisted into a mockery of the writer's intent.

Using a pair of red rubies gained from their dealings and combat with the giants and dwarves of the mountains and the Amazulu of the jungle, the party gains entrance to the River Styx which runs beneath the basement of the castle, and is overrun by eerie spirits and the undead - and guarded by the three-headed dog Cerberus, in-game known as Spot. There, they eventually meet the lost King and Queen, and the King's lover Rebecca. The King, having used the cursed Cosmic Forge to wish himself immortal, suffers the Bane of living forever as a vampire, unable to feel any human emotion. He attacks the party and drinks their blood, and leaves them weakened, but alive.|

The party also meets the long dead Queen, whose spirit still haunts the world. She relates the story of how she was forced to be impregnated by a demon at the King's command, and after she gave birth to the half-demon creature Rebecca, the King took the young girl as his lover, then ordered the Queen put to death. Her vengeful spirit gives the party a silver cross and instructs them to use it to kill both the King and Rebecca.

In actuality, her story is untrue. The King, in fact, took Rebecca in as his own, when a holy man known only as the Vicar and his betrothed, Annie, left her in his care. This caretaker relationship eventually developed into a romantic one. The Queen's death was not by the King's order, and was in fact her own doing. Jealous at having been tossed aside for the young girl as the King's lover, the Queen used the Cosmic Forge and wrote of the death of the "witch," which the Bane interpreted as meaning herself, and she slipped and fell on her own knife.

Finally, the party meets Rebecca, who hypnotizes them and brings them to meet the King a second time. The story branches from here, depending on whether the party believed the lies of the Queen. If they did, they still have the silver cross given to them by the Queen, the King burns himself upon it, and the party is thrown into prison. If they did not believe the Queen and threw the cross away, the King drinks his fill of blood, then throws the party into prison anyway. The choice the party makes becomes much more important later, after they make their escape from the prison.

After eliminating the physical form of Xorphitus, they enter a final meeting with the King. If the party disbelieved the Queen and discarded the cross, the King relates to the party his struggles with a life of no emotion, and then kills himself by thrusting a holy stake of wood into his own heart. Rebecca appears afterward, and asks the party to take care of both the Cosmic Forge and her half-brother, the dragon Bela, who was born of an affair between the Queen and the Vicar.

When Rebecca first appears, if the party says, "I love you," she will give them a diamond ring. This ring has excellent healing and defensive stats, and can be used in Wizardry VII to acquire some of the strongest items in the game, and can be returned to Bela in Wizardry 8 for a massive experience bonus and his thanks.

Returning to the branching story line, a party allied with the Queen is forced to fight the King, and on the more difficult game settings, his lover Rebecca. As vampires, the two of them may only be damaged by holy stakes of wood and holy water. After his death, the spirit of the King relates his struggle, and then disappears.

After the King is dead, either by his own hand or by the party's, the chamber of the Cosmic Forge is finally revealed before them.

If the party decides to secure it, a voice says, "I'll take that!" (this is the voice of Aletheides, a cyborg who returns in Wizardry VII and 8). At this point, a screen appears to tell the player to save a savegame for use in the sequel, and is then transported back to the forest outside the prison so the party can continue to train for the sequel, or just adventure.

If the party does not take the pen when prompted, they continue on through another door to meet Bela, and the final story branch occurs here. If the party did not believe the Queen and did not kill the King and Rebecca, Bela is elated at having new company. Together, if the player so wishes, the dragon and the party enter the mouth of a spaceship and take off for the stars to chase Aletheides. On the other hand, a party that believed the Queen is forced into combat with a vengeful Bela. After killing him, they may enter the mouth of the spaceship on their own, and blast off into the stars by themselves.

A shipbound party that goes with Bela meets the Umpani in the next game, while a shipbound party that goes without him will end up captives, and unwilling servants, of the Dark Savant and the T'Rang.

The origins of the spaceship are explained by Bela during the story path where the party befriends him. He apparently made it through instruction gained from an interstellar communication device from the Umpani, a race prominently featured in Wizardry VII and 8. He also says that it is powered by the remains of the dinosaurs in the forest, i.e. oil/gasoline. Also, if the party refuses Bela's offer to travel the stars, he offers them the key to the castle so that the party may return to the entrance where the game began. He then asks them to turn the lights out when they're done.

=== Endings ===
In all, there are three different endings to the game:

- The "Bela" ending, which requires dropping the silver cross before meeting the King for the second time (and therefore, disbelieving the Queen), then accepting Bela's offer to chase Aletheides.
- The "Ship" ending, which requires holding on to the silver cross when meeting the King for the second time (and therefore, believing the Queen), then choosing to board the spaceship after killing Bela.
- The "Cosmic Forge" ending, completely independent of whether the party believed the Queen, which is achieved by trying to take the Cosmic Forge when prompted.

== Reception ==
Computer Gaming World's Marc Clupper in 1991 praised the game's detailed weapons and skills, user interface, graphics, digitized audio, and non-grid maps. He concluded that Bane was "a triumphant celebration of the Wizardry heritage" that would "repeat the glory of its predecessor". The magazine's Scorpia that year and in 1993 described the game as "weak in parts, but better than Wizardry V". The game was reviewed in 1991 in Dragon #168 by Hartley, Patricia, and Kirk Lesser in "The Role of Computers" column. The reviewers gave the game 4 out of 5 stars. The Lessers reviewed the Macintosh version of the game in Dragon #174, giving that version of the game 4 out of 5 stars.

Jim Trunzo reviewed Bane of the Cosmic Forge in White Wolf #27 (June/July, 1991), rating it a 4 out of 5 and stated that "Bane of the Cosmic Forge is bound to have many well-earned admirers; the game handles many familiar facets of fantasy roleplaying in interesting new ways. The huge investment in programming time assures the gamer of numerous surprises from beer drinking contests to fascinating exchanges with non-playing characters."

Lisa Stevens reviewed the Macintosh version of Bane of the Cosmic Forge in White Wolf #28 (Aug./Sept., 1991), rating it a 4 out of 5 and stated that "I did enjoy Bane of the Cosmic Forge. It marks a definite upgrade in the available adventure game software for the Mac. The graphics and adventure flow are both definite pluses, while the dungeon crawl nature and the annoying door quirk [...] prevent my review from being totally glowing. For those of you who have long been jaded by poor Macintosh adventure games, a jaunt through Bane of the Cosmic Forge is just what the doctor ordered."

In 2013, Wizardry VI was ported for modern systems and re-released on Steam by Night Dive Studios.

=== Awards and honors ===
- Strategy Plus Magazine, 1991, Best Role Playing Game.
- Computer Gaming World, April 1991, nominated for Role-Playing Game of the year.
- GamesMaster, July 1996, ranked 73rd on their "Top 100 Games of All Time."
