= Freakin' Funky Fuzzballs =

1990 video game

- Developer(s): Sir-Tech Software
- Publisher(s): Sir-Tech Software
- Designer(s): Ian Currie; Robert Koller
- Programmer(s): Ian Currie
- Platform(s): MS-DOS
- Release: 1990
- Genre(s): Puzzle
- Mode(s): Single-player, multiplayer

Freakin' Funky Fuzzballs is a puzzle video game designed by Ian Currie and Robert Koller for MS-DOS and published in 1990 by Sir-Tech Software. Viewed from a top-down perspective, a fuzzball must navigate fifteen levels across five worlds.

== Gameplay ==
There are two different kinds of worlds, fall-out maps and static maps. In fall-out maps, tiles change colors when stepped on and disappear when they turn blue. In static maps, the tiles change from dark to light pink.

In each case, the objective of each level is to find the proper number of keys or keycards to open the exit to the next level. The keys are buried under tiles and can only be revealed by stepping on the tiles.

In addition to keys, there are an assortment of other items-

- Rings increase the fuzzball's vitality, or maximum amount of health.
- Food (many varieties exist) increase the fuzzball's health.
- Wands let the fuzzball create a temporary bridge between two tiles.
- Potions yield +100 health and vitality.
- Armor permanently decreases the amount of damage dealt to the fuzzball by the enemy.
- Shields block the enemy's attacks.
- Scrolls have unpredictable effects that cannot be determined until they are used.
- Teleporters teleport the fuzzball from one room to another.
- Doors, Gates, Elevators, and Airlocks take Fuzzball to the next level.
- The Match (final level) sets fire to the dynamite.
- The Dynamite (final level) blows up the enemy, ending the game.

== Reception ==
Computer Gaming World called the game "an original twist on old arcade inspirations ... an addictive pursuit reminiscent of Tetris".
