= Wizardry: Tale of the Forsaken Land =

2001 video game

- Developer: Racjin
- Publishers: JP: Atlus; NA: Atlus USA; EU: Ubi Soft
- Directors: Hideki Yayama; Takeshi Murata
- Designers: Shūhei Fujinaga; Yumiko Hattori
- Programmer: Hirokazu Matsuno
- Series: Wizardry
- Platform: PlayStation 2
- Release: JP: November 15, 2001; NA: December 17, 2001; EU: October 4, 2002
- Genre: Role-playing
- Mode: Single-player

Wizardry: Tale of the Forsaken Land (Note: Japanese: ブシン 〜ウィザードリィ オルタナティブ〜, Hepburn: Bushin 〜Wizādoryi Orutanatibu〜; lit. Busin: Wizardry Alternative) is a 2001 PlayStation 2 role-playing video game and a spin-off of the Wizardry series, published by Atlus.

== Gameplay ==
Tale of the Forsaken Land takes place in the kingdom of Duhan, which was recently struck by a disaster known as The Flash. The Flash not only killed thousands, but also left Duhan in a state of perpetual cold, and separated from the outside world. On the outskirts of town lies the Labyrinth of Duhan, which the player-created protagonist must explore, whether for treasure, the truth about his own past, or for the kingdom.

Like the other games in the series, Tale of the Forsaken Land uses a first person perspective. Other elements such as classes, races, class changes, and magic resembling Wizardry I-V are implemented as well. The classes, Warrior, Priest, Thief, Sorcerer, Bishop, Samurai, Knight, and Ninja, all have initial requirements that must be met in order to choose them, such as attributes and alignment, making some classes possible only after one has gained enough experience in the dungeon. Movement through town is done by choosing locations from a 3D menu that scrolls to the location in the town, and the options are fairly straightforward. The Guild Hall allows group reformation and the creation of new members from scratch, much the same way as the initial character is generated, as well as the learning of new group "tactics" such as 'Charge', which require that the group rapport is at a certain minimum (if one continues to annoy their group members by attacking friendly monsters, or acting inconsistent with their alignment, they will lose their trust in them, thus invalidating that tactic).

The Inn is where characters must go to gain benefits from any level increases, as well as recover lost HP and MP. The Church, known as 'Salem Temple', is where any parties must go to recover from negative status effects (at least, without the aid of a proper healer in the group), and to revive dead party members (not always guaranteed to work, especially if a party member has been reduced to Ash). Vigger's Shop is where one can sell and buy items as well as craft magic stones that allow one to learn new spells or enhance old ones. Additionally, Vigger can unequip cursed items, or remove their curse entirely (though this will render the item worthless), as well as appraise items of unknown value. Lastly, there is the Tavern, 'Luna Light', where party members can be dismissed and recruited, and quests from the locals can be taken on by the protagonist for assorted rewards, as well as the gaining of new party members.

Duhan is also the only location where the game can be saved, with the exception of suspending data, which can be done at any point outside of the town. Suspended data is deleted once loaded. Beneath the town lies the dungeon that is in this case called the Labyrinth of Duhan. Movement in the dungeon is 1st person 3D, with the thumbsticks allowing the player to "peek" around before turning in 90 degree increments. The shoulder buttons allow one to side-step, and there is a run button (O). That, combined with the unlockable shortcuts to deeper reaches adds a welcome enhancement to what veterans of the series might recall as a tedious trudge. The environments are memorable and varied, with NPCs spread about such that it is difficult to get lost in the earlier levels. There is an automap and plenty of transfer potions that one can buy, ensuring that after the first few hours, the player will have the ability to come and go from the Labyrinth with relative ease.

There was also a morale system where characters would like or dislike you more depending on certain actions that were taken (running from combat, successfully unlocking chests, etc.). This allowed for more advanced techniques that would become unlocked over time as you spent more time with various party members.

== Reception ==
Reception

Aggregate score
Aggregator	Score
Metacritic	70/100

Review scores
Publication	Score
Electronic Gaming Monthly	5/10
Famitsu	32/40
Game Informer	6.5/10
GamePro	3.5/5
GameSpot	8.5/10
GameSpy	80%
GameZone	7.5/10
IGN	7.2/10
Official U.S. PlayStation Magazine	3/5
PlayStation: The Official Magazine	6/10

The game received "average" reviews according to the review aggregation website Metacritic. In Japan, Famitsu gave it a score of 32 out of 40.

== Sequel ==
A second Wizardry Alternative game, titled Busin 0: Wizardry Alternative Neo (BUSIN 0(ブシン ゼロ) ウィザードリィ オルタナティブ ネオ, Bushin Zero Wizādoryi Orutanatibu Neo), was released only in Japan by Atlus on November 13, 2003, with a new story, characters, and labyrinths to explore. Famitsu also gave it a score of 32 out of 40.
