= Wizardry VII: Crusaders of the Dark Savant =

1992 role-playing video game

- Developer: Sir-Tech (Note: PlayStation version developed by Sony Computer Entertainment Japan.)
- Publisher: Sir-Tech: ASCII Corporation (FM Towns, PC-98) Sony Computer Entertainment (PlayStation) Night Dive Studios (digital)
- Designer: David W. Bradley
- Series: Wizardry
- Platforms: MS-DOS, FM Towns, PC-98, PlayStation, Saturn, Windows, Classic Mac OS
- Release: 1992: MS-DOS; 1994: FM Towns, PC-98; 1995: PlayStation; May 28, 1996: Windows, Mac
- Genre: Role-playing
- Mode: Single-player

Wizardry VII: Crusaders of the Dark Savant (originally known as Wizardry: Crusaders of the Dark Savant) is a role-playing video game developed and published by Sir-Tech. A sequel to Wizardry VI: Bane of the Cosmic Forge, it is the seventh game in the Wizardry series and the second entry in the Dark Savant trilogy. The game was released in 1992 for MS-DOS. A conversion to the PlayStation developed by Sony Computer Entertainment was released in 1995 only in Japan. In 1996 an enhanced version, Wizardry Gold, was released for Windows 95 and Classic Mac OS and distributed by Interplay.

The setting is a science fiction/fantasy universe, featuring interplanetary space travel and cybernetic androids, alongside high fantasy arms, armor and magic. The story picks up where its predecessor left off. The recovery and subsequent theft of the magical artifact known as the Cosmic Forge in Wizardry VI: Bane of the Cosmic Forge has revealed the planet Guardia, the hiding place of another power artifact, the Astral Dominae. Multiple factions have converged on Guardia attempting to locate this artifact, including a party of adventurers controlled by the player, and the principal adversary, the eponymous Dark Savant.

The game includes a diplomacy mechanic. There are multiple competing factions with different interests in the world of Guardia. The player may engage in diplomacy when key NPCs of the factions are encountered, and may attempt to bribery, peaceful negotiations, or threaten force. It is also an early game to feature NPC competition with the player; as time progresses NPCs may beat the player to obtaining certain quest items, forcing the player to change their priorities. It is the first game in the Wizardry series with VGA color graphics.

== Gameplay ==
Crusaders of the Dark Savant is played from a first person perspective, with the party's character portraits visible alongside what they see in the game world, and movement is tile-based, and the player can only turn in 90° increments. The game supported contemporary VGA displays and a variety of sound cards for effects, and synthesized background music. The player could use the mouse or keyboard to navigate the user interface.

The party's characters are not autonomous and have no personality; they are completely under the player's control. The gender, portrait, race and profession of each character is, however, customizable, allowing for many different types of parties to explore the world of Lost Guardia. The party of player characters can be imported from a previous saved game of Wizardry VI, or characters may be created anew. Each character's statistics (such as strength and intelligence) are given a baseline by the character's race and gender. A random dice roll provides a certain number of bonus points for each character. Each profession has minimum requirements for entrance, so a given random character may not be eligible for some professions. Unfortunately, this means to be an elite group, the player may need to spend considerable amounts of time trying to obtain the highest possible dice rolls to create strong or exotic characters (such as the faerie ninja). Formation of the party, up to six, is set up to allow the first three characters to be on the front line, where stronger short ranged weapons can be used, but where more damage is taken. The final three can only hit with ranged weapons, spells or while hidden, but are less likely to be hit and take damage. The game lets the player change a character's profession at a later time, provided the character meets the class' requirements. This permits the player to develop more versatile characters (allowing fighters to obtain magic, for example), and allows characters to join professions they were not eligible to join at creation. Profession changes carries certain penalties.

Each race has a certain statistic value attached to them, before bonuses:

- Strength affects carrying capacity and melee damage.
- Intelligence affects the number of academic skill points and the number of spell points a character gets.
- Piety does the same as Intelligence and also affects spell point regeneration speed.
- Vitality affects HP, and resistance to disease.
- Dexterity affects number of attacks per round and thieving skills.
- Speed affects number of total attack rounds available and initiative.
- Personality affects how likely a character is to make friends with neutral or hostile NPCs.
- Karma does much the same as Personality, except that low values in Karma impress similarly low Karma NPCs (thieves like the company of thieves, and so on).

As with the first five Wizardry games, the races include Tolkien-esque Humans, Elves, Dwarves, Gnomes and Hobbits. However, continuing with the expansion of this concept in Bane of the Cosmic Forge, Lizardmen, Faeries, Dracons (a race of half-Human, half-Dragon creatures), Rawulf (a race of humanoid dogs), Felpurr (a race of humanoid cats) and the alien Mook (a race of tall and hairy Sasquatch-like people, who make an appearance in Wizardry 8) are all playable. Each race carries its own unique set of benefits and detriments to statistics, unique resistances, and can make use of race specific equipment. The game even includes a weapon that is relegated only to Faeries who become Ninja: the incredible Cane of Corpus.

There are also several classes:

- Fighters are the frontline troops.
- Thieves disarm traps, steal and fight.
- Samurai, Lords, the female-only Valkyries, Bards, Rangers, Monk and Ninja are all hybrid classes that can fight, in addition to casting spells and/or thieving.
- Psionics, Priests, Mages and Alchemists all cast spells from one of the game world's four spellbooks.
- Bishops cast both Priest and Mage spells, but learn them half as quickly as a pure Priest or Mage.

Combat is phased or turn based. When battle begins, the enemy party is shown graphically on the worldview screen. The fastest characters or monsters act first, complete their turn, then allow the next fastest person to take theirs. This mechanic means that party members' actions may take no effect (if a party member attacks a group that others have already eliminated) or healers may take their turn too late and fail to save their injured companions. Leveling is similar to other RPGs. When enough experience is earned through defeating enemies, a character advances in their current class, earning new statistics, skills, spells and ranks in that class. Statistical growth can result in one statistic going up, several going up, or even (rarely) having one decrease. Skill gains are divided among weapon skills, physical skills like swimming and climbing, academic skills like spells, critical strikes and mythology, and "personal" skills. NPC interaction, on the DOS and Windows versions of Crusaders of the Dark Savant, is carried out by the mouse and keyboard. The mouse selects general actions, such as "Fight," "Spell," or "Trade." Magic is divided into four schools of magic, and six elements. The four schools are: Psionics, mind-based spells; Alchemy, potion-based spells; Theology, prayer-based spells; and Thaumaturgy, element-based spells. The six elements are fire, water, air, earth, mental and divine.

== Plot ==
Crusaders of the Dark Savant starts at the end of Wizardry VI: Bane of the Cosmic Forge. The party had just found the Cosmic Forge, the pen that the Cosmic Lords use to script the events of the universe, after it was stolen by the Bane King and his Wizard, Xorphitus. Before the party could decide what to do with it, it was spirited away by a servant of the Cosmic Lords, the cyborg Aletheides. The Cosmic Forge was used to hide the location of the Astral Dominae, a powerful artifact with power over life itself, on planet Guardia. Because of this, its theft revealed Planet Guardia to the universe. Now, multiple forces are converging on Lost Guardia to find this artifact, including the party itself. It is after planetfall on Guardia that the story begins.

As there are three endings to Bane of the Cosmic Forge, there are four beginnings to Crusaders of the Dark Savant (one for each of the endings from the previous game, and a fourth for parties who are starting fresh). The first beginning follows a party who believed the lies of the Bane Queen and killed her husband, the Bane King, his lover, Rebecca, and her brother, Bela. On a whim, the party then enters the mouth of a "giant slumbering beast" (in actuality, a spaceship), which was secreted behind Bela's room, and takes off for the stars. The ship is captured in mid-flight by the Black Ship Dedaelis, which belongs to the Dark Savant, who is the main antagonist of the story. The party is then pressed into service by the Savant, who explains that he wants the Astral Dominae to overthrow the Cosmic Lords, and they are then transported down to Lost Guardia to aid the T'Rang in finding the Astral Dominae for the Savant. The second beginning follows a party who did not believe the lies of the Bane Queen, and who spared the life of the Bane King. He commits suicide, and Rebecca gives the party the key to her brother Bela's room. In this case, Bela does not attack the party; in fact, the party agrees to accompany him on his spaceship to chase Aletheides to his destination. As Bela has been in contact with a race called the Umpani for some time on an interstellar communication device, the party transports to the surface of Guardia just outside Ukpyr, where the Umpani are based. They then have the option of joining up with the Imperial Umpani Federation in their mission to defeat the T'Rang. The third beginning is not hinged on believing the Bane Queen or not; rather, it is dependent on whether or not the party decides to take the Cosmic Forge before boarding Bela's ship. Aletheides appears and takes the pen, and offers the party the opportunity to accompany him to Lost Guardia. After a long voyage, he transports the party to the surface of Guardia just outside Dionysceus, where the Dane live. The fourth beginning for new parties describes the party as adventure and treasure seekers, who stumble upon the Cosmic Forge in an abandoned temple. Aletheides appears and introduces the events of Wizardry VI, then the party accompanies him to Lost Guardia. This party starts just outside New City.

Whatever the initial circumstances of the party's arrival on Guardia, they are free to make or break alliances as they see fit. For example, a party initially aligned with the Savant and the T'Rang are fully capable of turning on them, with no repercussions in finishing the game. In fact, it is possible to either befriend or make enemies of every nation on the planet, and still be able to complete the main quest. The main plot involves the party's quest to find the resting place of the Astral Dominae, the greatest artifact ever created by the god Phoonzang. There are four distinct endings; each of these endings can then be imported as savegame files to Wizardry 8, the final chapter of the Dark Savant trilogy, which in turn has its own set of five beginnings. Each of the seven races of Guardia have a small side story of their own to complete, and almost all of them are necessary to finish in order to acquire the items needed to unlock the resting place of the Astral Dominae, the Isle of Crypts:

- The Umpani want the death of the T'Rang queen, who if left alive, would spawn enough T'Rang to overrun Guardia and every world near it. They need the party to slay her, as the T'Rang would be less likely to suspect a group of Humans, Elves, Mook, etc... than a group of Umpani as assassins.
- The T'Rang are searching for a lost map that may lead them to the Astral Dominae, and plot to turn on the Dark Savant to acquire this ultimate prize. The party is tasked with the first two of the T'Rang's three goals.
- The Munk seek their lost Holy Work, which is being held by a fallen Munk sect underneath their city, and need the party to find it.
- The Dane desire the Cornu of Demonspawn, a powerful magical artifact, which is a horn on the forehead of a demon that the party must summon and defeat.
- The Gorn are in the midst of civil war, due to the interference of unnamed visitors from the stars, and it is up to the party to hear the tale of their betrayer, the Wizard Murkatos, and restore the spirit of the King.
- The Rattkin plot to ambush a T'Rang starship to extend their criminal empire offworld, and need the party's help to find the landing time of the perfect ship.
- The Helazoid guard the secrets of Phoonzang for the Crusaders of their prophecy, the party itself.

== Release ==
The first main difference between the original Crusaders of the Dark Savant and Wizardry Gold is that they are designed for different computer platforms. While Crusaders of the Dark Savant can be played on Windows 3.1, Windows NT, and Windows 95 computers (and beyond), Wizardry Gold will not work in DOS by itself. A major development in the Wizardry Gold version was the introduction of speech, primarily in the form of a narrator. Wizardry Gold was included as part of Interplay's Ultimate RPG Archives, that was released in 1998, and an enhanced version is available in the Ultimate Wizardry Archives that contains the first seven Wizardry titles. Gamepot re-released Wizardry Gold bundled with Wizardry VI for Windows on May 13, 2013, and for OS X on November 15, 2013, in GOG.com. On September 10, 2013, Night Dive Studios released a port for Windows, OS X and Linux on Steam, although the Gold edition is only available for Windows.

== Reception ==
Scorpia of Computer Gaming World in 1993 stated that Crusaders of the Dark Savant was "the first Wizardry that has a real-world feel to it ... there are towns, ruins, wilderness, mountains and even a small sea" with the player interacting with multiple races that cooperated and competed with each other. She approved of the improved inventory management, but criticized the small automap. More seriously, she called the open world design "deceptive" as backtracking and "hours in a fruitless search" were often necessary to solve a puzzle. She nonetheless concluded that "Crusaders of the Dark Savant is certainly an improvement over the last couple of games", and recommended it to "Wizardry fans and experienced gamers (who are willing to put up with some of the frustrations)". Later that year, she stated that the game "should not be missed, especially not by Wizardry fans", and named it Role-Playing Game of the Year. In 1996, the magazine named Wizardry VII the 105th best game ever.

In PC Magazine, Barry Brenesal remarked, "When it comes to an interesting, complex plot, Crusaders handily beats the rest [of the series]." He wrote that the game "gets high marks for its humor, its excellent characterization, and its thorough and well-detailed documentation."

PCGames and Computer Games Strategy Plus both named Wizardry VII the best role-playing game of 1992. The latter magazine's Joan McKeown wrote, "As grand an experience as that provided by Ultima Underworld could hardly be topped by anything short of the best game ever: Wizardry VII: Crusaders of the Dark Savant from Sir-Tech has topped everything out there, including Underworld."

Chris W. McCubbin reviewed Wizardry VII: Crusaders of the Dark Savant in Pyramid #1 (May/June, 1993), and stated that "Despite its flaws, Wizardry remains far and away my favorite computer FRPG series. If you're looking for a state-of-the-art gaming experience big enough to keep you busy through the whole summer vacation, look here first."
