= Star Saga: Two - The Clathran Menace =

1989 video game

- Developer: Masterplay Publishing
- Publisher: Masterplay Publishing
- Platforms: Apple IIGS, Apple II, MS-DOS
- Release: 1989

Star Saga: Two - The Clathran Menace is a video game, the second in the Star Saga series, released in 1989 by Masterplay Publishing for Apple II, Apple IIGS, and MS-DOS.

== Gameplay ==
In this title, a gigantic armada of alien ships scours the galaxy, seeking to eliminate any and all sentient life. Players must quickly explore the accessible reaches of space, hoping to uncover technology with which to oppose this threat.

== Reception ==
The second game is described as being more difficult than the first, due to frequent conflicts with the Clathran "Survey Line" which inexorably moves across the galaxy. It's also more linear, in that players are prevented from undertaking certain activities due to current game conditions. Nonetheless, the Computer Gaming World review concludes, "Despite the few faults, Star Saga Two is a wonderfully written and produced game that can really glue you to the computer." The editors of Game Player's PC Strategy Guide gave Star Saga Two their 1989 "Best PC Science Fiction Game" award. They wrote, "Although darker and more sinister in tone than its predecessor, Star Saga: Two is still a rollicking, all-stops-out space opera".
