= Wizardry (video game series) =

Video game series

- Genre: Role-playing
- Developer: Sir-Tech
- Publisher: Sir-Tech
- Creators: Andrew C. Greenberg; Robert Woodhead
- First release: Wizardry: Proving Grounds of the Mad Overlord; September 1981
- Latest release: Wizardry Variants Daphne; October 15, 2024
- Spin-offs: Nemesis; Wizardry Gaiden series Wizardry Empire series 20 more games

Wizardry is a series of role-playing video games originally created by American publisher Sir-Tech. The series was influential in the evolution of modern role-playing video games alongside Ultima and Might and Magic. The original Wizardry was a significant influence on early console role-playing games such as Shin Megami Tensei, Dragon Slayer, the Shining series, Fire Emblem, Final Fantasy and Dragon Quest. Originally made for the Apple II, the games were later ported to other platforms. The last game in the original series by Sir-Tech was Wizardry 8, released in 2001. There have since been various spin-off titles developed for the Japanese market.

== Development ==
Wizardry began as a simple dungeon crawl by Andrew C. Greenberg and Robert Woodhead. It was written when they were students at Cornell University and published by Sir-Tech. The game was influenced by earlier games from the PLATO system, most notably Oubliette. The earliest installments of Wizardry were very successful, as they were the first graphically-rich incarnations of Dungeons & Dragons-type gameplay for home computers. The release of the first version coincided with the first wave of Dungeons & Dragons' popularity in North America.

The first five games in the series were written in Apple Pascal, an implementation of UCSD Pascal. They were ported to many different platforms by writing UCSD Pascal implementations for the target machines (Mac II cross-development). David W. Bradley took over the series after the fourth installment, adding a new level of plot and complexity. In 1998, the rights were transferred to 1259190 Ontario Inc., and in 2006, to Aeria IPM. In 2008, Aeria IPM merged with Gamepot, the developer of Wizardry Online and in 2017, Gamepot was shut down and absorbed into its parent company GMO Internet. Drecom announced they had acquired Wizardry from GMO Internet on October 29, 2020. Atari acquired the first five games from Drecom on May 6, 2026, though this was later disputed by Drecom the following day.

In May 2024, a remake of Wizardry: Proving Grounds of the Mad Overlord developed by Digital Eclipse and published by Atari SA was released on modern platforms. This was later followed by the acquisition of the series' underlying intellectual property and the rights to the first five games by Atari SA in May 2026, with plans to publisher and remaster these, and to create new games in the series.

Datamost released the menu-driven WizPlus, a utility program that allowed users to make changes to both the characters and also to the playing environment of Wizardry; Bob Reams reviewed the utility for Computer Gaming World, and said that "WizPlus should be used with great caution or the spirit of adventuring will be diluted and, more importantly, you will not be able to continue with this exciting series".

== Games ==
Release timeline
1981	Proving Grounds of the Mad Overlord
1982	II: The Knight of Diamonds
1983	III: Legacy of Llylgamyn
1984
1985
1986
1987	IV: The Return of Werdna
1988	V: Heart of the Maelstrom
1989
1990	VI: Bane of the Cosmic Forge
1991
1992	VII: Crusaders of the Dark Savant
1993
1994
1995
1996	Nemesis: The Wizardry Adventure
1997
1998
1999
2000
2001	8

=== Main series ===
The original Wizardry series is composed of eight different titles. All of the titles were first released in North America, and then ported to Japanese computers. Some of the titles were also officially released in Europe. The first three games are a trilogy, with similar settings, plots, and gameplay mechanics. A second trilogy is formed by installments 6 through 8 – Bane of the Cosmic Forge, Crusaders of the Dark Savant and Wizardry 8 – with settings and gameplay mechanics that differed greatly from the first trilogy. The fourth game, The Return of Werdna, was a significant departure from the rest of the series. In it, the player controls Werdna ("Andrew", one of the game's developers, spelled backwards), the evil wizard slain in the first game, and summons groups of monsters to aid him as he fights his way through the prison in which he had been held captive. Rather than monsters, the player faced typical adventuring parties, some of which were pulled from actual user disks sent to Sir-Tech for recovery. Further, the player had only a limited number of keystrokes to use to complete the game.

In Japan, the Wizardry series was translated by ASCII Entertainment, and became very influential during the 1980s, even as its popularity at home declined. When first introduced, the games suffered from the culture barrier compounded by low-quality translation. This meant that the game was taken seriously by players who overlooked the in-game jokes and parodies. For example, Blade Cusinart was introduced in early games as "a legendary sword made by the famous blacksmith, Cusinart [sic]" but its meaning was misinterpreted because Cuisinart food processors were virtually unknown in Japan. However, this misconception appealed to early computer gamers who were looking for something different and made the Wizardry series popular. Conversely, the fourth game, The Return of Werdna, was poorly received, as, lacking the knowledge of subcultures necessary to solving the game, Japanese players had no chance of figuring out some puzzles.

The eight main titles in the series are:

Title	Original release date		
Title	Japan	North America	PAL region
Wizardry: Proving Grounds of the Mad Overlord	November 1985 (FM-7)	September 1981 (Apple II)	1983 (Apple II)
Notes: Originally released for the Apple II.; Ported to Mac, Sharp MZ-2500, Sharp X1 Turbo, FM-7, FM-77, PC-8801, PC-9801, MSX2, NES, Game Boy Color, WonderSwan Color, Mobile phone, Commodore 64, Commodore 128.; Also available for the PC Engine as part of Wizardry I + II (1993), for the Super Famicom as part of Wizardry I-II-III: Story of Llylgamyn (1999), and for Microsoft Windows, PlayStation and Sega Saturn as part of Wizardry: Llylgamyn Saga (1998).; Part of Wizardry Trilogy (1987), a compilation of the first three Wizardry games, released for Apple II and Commodore 64.; Part of The Ultimate Wizardry Archives (1998), a compilation of the first seven Wizardry games plus the 1996 remake of the seventh game, Wizardry Gold, released for Microsoft Windows and MS-DOS.; Owners of the WonderSwan Color port could download 10 extra stages exclusive to this version through a connection between the Mobile Wonder Gate add-on and a PDC mobile phone.; A remastered version was released on PS4, PS5, Nintendo Switch and Xbox Series X/S in late 2024.
Wizardry II: The Knight of Diamonds	December 1986 (FM-7)	1982 (Apple II)	—N/a
Notes: Originally released for the Apple II.; Ported to Macintosh, Sharp MZ-2500, Sharp X1 Turbo, FM-7, FM-77, PC-8801, PC-9801, MSX2, NES, Game Boy Color, Commodore 64.; Also available for the PC Engine as part of Wizardry I + II (1993), for the Super Famicom as part of Wizardry I-II-III: Story of Llylgamyn (1999), and for Microsoft Windows, PlayStation and Sega Saturn as part of Wizardry: Llylgamyn Saga (1998).; Part of Wizardry Trilogy (1987) and The Ultimate Wizardry Archives (1998).
Wizardry III: Legacy of Llylgamyn	1987 (FM-7)	1983 (Apple II)	—N/a
Notes: Originally released for the Apple II.; Ported to Sharp X1 Turbo, FM-7, FM-77, PC-8801, PC-9801, MSX2, Famicom, Game Boy Color, Commodore 64.; Also available for the PC Engine as part of Wizardry III + IV (1994), for the Super Famicom as part of Wizardry I-II-III: Story of Llylgamyn (1999), and for Microsoft Windows, PlayStation and Sega Saturn as part of Wizardry: Llylgamyn Saga (1998).; Part of Wizardry Trilogy (1987) and The Ultimate Wizardry Archives (1998).
Wizardry IV: The Return of Werdna	December 1988 (PC-88)	1987 (Apple II)	—N/a
Notes: Originally released for the Apple II.; Ported to Sharp X1 Turbo, FM-7, FM-77, PC-8801, PC-9801.; Also available for the PC Engine as part of Wizardry III + IV (1994), and PlayStation as part of Wizardry: New Age of Llylgamyn (1999).; Part of The Ultimate Wizardry Archives (1998).
Wizardry V: Heart of the Maelstrom	June 8, 1990 (PC-98)	1988 (Apple II)	—N/a
Notes: Originally released for the Apple II.; Ported to FM Towns, PC-8801, PC-9801, SNES, PC Engine, Commodore 64.; Also available for the PlayStation as part of Wizardry: New Age of Llylgamyn (1999).; Part of Wizardry Trilogy 2 (1993), a compilation of Wizardry V, VI, and VII, released for MS-DOS.; Part of The Ultimate Wizardry Archives (1998).
Wizardry VI: Bane of the Cosmic Forge	December 1991 (FM Towns)	1990 (Amiga, MS-DOS)	1991 (Amiga, MS-DOS)
Notes: Originally released for Amiga and MS-DOS.; Ported to FM Towns, PC-9801, 98note, J-3100, SNES.; Also available for the Sega Saturn as part of Wizardry: VI and VII Complete (1996).; Part of Wizardry Trilogy 2 (1993) and The Ultimate Wizardry Archives (1998).
Wizardry VII: Crusaders of the Dark Savant	September 1994 (FM Towns)	October 1992 (MS-DOS)	1992 (MS-DOS)
Notes: Originally released for MS-DOS.; Ported to PC-9801, PC-9821, PlayStation.; Also available for the Sega Saturn as part of Wizardry: VI and VII Complete (1996).; Part of Wizardry Trilogy 2 (1993) and The Ultimate Wizardry Archives (1998).
Wizardry 8	December 20, 2001 (PC)	November 14, 2001 (PC)	2001 (PC)
Notes: Last game in the main series, originally released for Microsoft Windows.

=== American spin-off game ===
In 1996, the series received the first (and, so far, only) spin-off developed in North America, titled Nemesis: The Wizardry Adventure. Every other Wizardry spin-off has been developed in Japan.

Nemesis is played as a solo adventure: one character only, with no supporting party or monsters. All players use the same character, without the ability to choose class or attributes. In addition, the game contains only 16 spells, compared to 50 in the first four adventures, and more in the subsequent ones. It is also the first Wizardry title where the player saw enemies in advance and thus could try to avoid them.

Title	Original release date		
Title	Japan	North America	PAL region
Nemesis: The Wizardry Adventure	January 22, 1998 (Sega Saturn)	September 30, 1996 (MS-DOS)	1996 (MS-DOS)
Notes: Only spin-off developed and originally released in North America.; Adventure game with role-playing elements.

=== Japanese spin-off games ===
The popularity of Wizardry in Japan inspired several original sequels, spin-offs, and ports, with the series long outliving the American original. As of 2022, thirty-nine different spin-offs were released in Japan, with six of them being localized and released worldwide. The latest released in both Japanese and English in 2024.

==== Wizardry Gaiden ====
Title	Original release date		
Title	Japan	North America	PAL region
Wizardry Gaiden I: Joō no Junan	October 1, 1991 (Game Boy)	—N/a	—N/a
Notes: Also known as Wizardry Gaiden I: Suffering of the Queen.; The full Japanese title is ウィザードリィ外伝I ～女王の受難～.; Success ported the game to cell phones in Japan in 2005 as Nether Domain: Second Chapter – Suffering of the Queen (ネザードメイン 第二章 女王の受難), dropping the connection with Wizardry.
Wizardry Gaiden II: Kodai Kōtei no Noroi	December 26, 1992 (Game Boy)	—N/a	—N/a
Notes: Also known as Wizardry Gaiden II: Curse of the Ancient Emperor.; The full Japanese title is ウィザードリィ外伝II ～古代皇帝の呪い～.; Success ported the game to cell phones in Japan in 2005 as Nether Domain: Third Chapter – Curse of the Ancient Emperor (ネザードメイン 第三章 古代皇帝の呪い), dropping the connection with Wizardry.
Wizardry Gaiden III: Yami no Seiten	September 25, 1993 (Game Boy)	—N/a	—N/a
Notes: Also known as Wizardry Gaiden III: Scripture of the Dark.; The full Japanese title is ウィザードリィ外伝III ～闇の聖典～.
Wizardry Gaiden IV: Taima no Kodō	September 20, 1996 (Super Famicom)	—N/a	—N/a
Notes: Also known as Wizardry Gaiden IV: Throb of the Demon's Heart.; The full Japanese title is ウィザードリィ外伝IV ～胎魔の鼓動～.
Wizardry Dimguil	April 20, 2000 (PlayStation)	—N/a	—N/a
Notes: Available only in Japanese, though the original release allows changing of enemy names, item names, spells and stats to English.; Players can transfer characters from Wizardry Gaiden III and IV through a password system.
Wizardry: Prisoners of the Battles	March 25, 2005 (PC)	March 30, 2023 (PC)	March 30, 2023 (PC)
Notes: Ported to the PlayStation 2 (2006), iOS (2012) and Android (2013).; The full Japanese title is Wizardry Gaiden: Sentō no Kangoku (jp: ウィザードリィ外伝 戦闘の監獄).; Music composed by Hitoshi Sakimoto's music production group Basiscape.; The game was officially localized later in March 2023, albeit as DLC for The Five Ordeals remaster.
Wizardry: The Absence of Misericordia	August 11, 2005 (PC)	June 22, 2023 (PC)	June 22, 2023 (PC)
Notes: An expansion scenario for Prisoners of the Battles.; Ported to iOS (2012) and Android (2013).; The full Japanese title is Wizardry Gaiden: Jihi no Fuzai (jp: ウィザードリィ外伝 慈悲の不在).; The game was officially localized later in June 2023, albeit as DLC for The Five Ordeals remaster.
Wizardry: The Five Ordeals	June 8, 2006 (PC)	December 17, 2021 (PC)	December 17, 2021 (PC)
Notes: Originally released in Japan as Wizardry Gaiden: Itsutsu no Shiren – Five Ordeals (jp: ウィザードリィ外伝 五つの試練).; Users can create scenarios through an online editor, as well as download other players' creations.; Music composed by Hitoshi Sakimoto's music production group Basiscape.; Released in English via Steam in December 2021 as Early Access and fully released in October 26, 2023.; Ported to the Nintendo Switch on January 30, 2025.

==== Wizardry Empire ====
All the games in this sub-series were developed by Starfish SD.

Title	Original release date		
Title	Japan	North America	PAL region
Wizardry Empire	October 29, 1999 (Game Boy Color)	—N/a	—N/a
Wizardry Empire: Fukkatsu no Tsue	December 22, 2000 (Game Boy Color)	—N/a	—N/a
Notes: Fukkatsu no Tsue (復活の杖) translates as "Resurrection Staff".
Wizardry Empire: Inishie no Ōjo	December 28, 2000 (PlayStation, PC)	—N/a	—N/a
Notes: Inishie no Ōjo (古の王女) translates as "The Old Princess".
Wizardry Empire II: Ōjo no Isan	October 17, 2002 (PlayStation)	—N/a	—N/a
Notes: Ōjo no Isan (王女の遺産) translates as "Legacy of the Princess".; Ported to PC in 2004 as Wizardry Empire II PLUS: Oujō no Isan.
Wizardry Empire III: Haō no Keifu	December 25, 2003 (PlayStation 2)	—N/a	—N/a
Notes: Haō no Keifu (覇王の系譜) translates as "Genealogy of the King".; Ported to the PlayStation Portable (2007).
Wizardry Asterisk: Hiiro no Fūin	December 29, 2005 (Nintendo DS)	—N/a	—N/a
Notes: The full Japanese title is ウィザードリィ アスタリスク 緋色の封印.; Hiiro no Fūin (緋色の封印) translates as "Scarlet Seal".

==== Busin Wizardry ====
Title	Original release date		
Title	Japan	North America	PAL region
Wizardry: Tale of the Forsaken Land	November 15, 2001 (PlayStation 2)	December 19, 2001 (PlayStation 2)	October 4, 2002 (PlayStation 2)
Notes: First Japanese spin-off to be officially translated to English and released in North America.; Released in Japan as Busin: Wizardry Alternative.
Busin 0: Wizardry Alternative Neo	November 13, 2003 (PlayStation 2)	—N/a	—N/a
Notes: Prequel to Wizardry: Tale of the Forsaken Land.

==== Wizardry XTH ====
Title	Original release date		
Title	Japan	North America	PAL region
Wizardry XTH: Academy of Frontier – Zensen no Gakufu	February 24, 2005 (PlayStation 2)	—N/a	—N/a
Notes: Also known as Wizardry Ekusu (ウィザードリィ エクス).; The full Japanese title is ウィザードリィ エクス ～前線の学府～.
Wizardry XTH 2: Unlimited Students – Mugen no Gakuto	March 23, 2006 (PlayStation 2)	—N/a	—N/a
Notes: Direct sequel to Wizardry Xth.; The full Japanese title is ウィザードリィエクス2 ～無限の学徒～.; Upon developer/publisher Michaelsoft's dissolution, many of the developers of Xth and Xth 2 stayed together as "Team Muramasa", and joined Experience, Inc. as an in house development studio.; Experience, Inc. would later release a PC remake of Xth and Xth 2 as the Generation Xth trilogy. Experience, and Team Muramasa specifically, have since become known for creating DRPG titles.; Wizardry Xth 2 was also seemingly ported to the PSP and re-branded as Class of Heroes (jp: 剣と魔法と学園モノ。). "PSP Wiz XTH" is notably mentioned in the program's data files. Class of Heroes would go on to spawn three sequels, a Switch remaster, and a strategy RPG spin-off.

==== Wizardry Renaissance ====
Title	Original release date		
Title	Japan	North America	PAL region
Wizardry: Seimei no Kusabi	November 19, 2009 (Nintendo DS)	—N/a	—N/a
Notes: Seimei no Kusabi (生命の楔) translates as "Wedge of Life".
Wizardry Online Mobile	May 24, 2010 (Mobile phone)	—N/a	—N/a
Notes: First MMORPG adaptation of the franchise.; Adopts an isometric view instead of the traditional first person view.
Wizardry: Bōkyaku no Isan	July 29, 2010 (Nintendo DS)	—N/a	—N/a
Notes: Bōkyaku no Isan (忘却の遺産) translates as "Legacy of Oblivion".
Wizardry: Labyrinth of Lost Souls	December 9, 2009 (PlayStation 3)	May 16, 2011 (PlayStation 3)	December 7, 2011 (PlayStation 3)
Notes: Released in Japan as Wizardry: Torawareshi Tamashii no Meikyū (ウィザードリィ 囚われし魂の迷宮, literally "Wizardry: Labyrinth of Imprisoned Souls").; Second Japanese spin-off to be officially translated to English and released in North America.; An expansion titled Shūdō On'na no Akaki Kage (修道女の赤き影), also known as "The Red Shadow of the Sister", was made available for the PlayStation 3 in Japan on July 19, 2011.; The original game and its expansion were also released as standalone versions for the iPhone in Japan.; A retail release with the game and the expansion titled Wizardry: Full Pack was released for the PlayStation 3 and iPhone in Japan on July 6, 2011.; A retail release with the game, the expansion and extra items sold individually as downloadable content titled Wizardry: Perfect Pack was released only for the PlayStation 3 in Japan on December 8, 2011.; The game was made available for Windows by Xseed Games in January 2020.
Wizardry: Torawareshi Bōrei no Machi	January 27, 2011 (PlayStation 3)	—N/a	—N/a
Notes: Torawareshi Bōrei no Machi (囚われし亡霊の街) translates as "City of Imprisoned Ghosts".; A retail release with Wizardry: Torawareshi Tamashii no Meikyū and Wizardry: Torawareshi Bōrei no Machi titled Wizardry: Twin Pack was released for the PlayStation 3 in Japan on January 27, 2011.
Wizardry Online	October 14, 2011 (PC)	January 16, 2013 (PC)	January 16, 2013 (PC)
Notes: Third Japanese spin-off to be officially translated to English and released in North America.
Tōkyō Meikyū – Wizardry 0	August 24, 2011 (Mobile phones)	—N/a	—N/a
Notes: Tōkyō Meikyū (東京迷宮) translates as "Tokyo Labyrinth".; Gameplay contains elements from card battle games.; First social-network game in the Wizardry series, through the Mobage service in Japan.
Wizardry: Senran no Matō	January 24, 2013 (iPhone)	—N/a	—N/a
Notes: Also ported to Android devices.; Senran no Matō (戦乱の魔塔) translates as "The Magical Tower of War".; Also known as Wizardry: Tower of the Maelstorm.; Second social-network game in the Wizardry series, developed by Namco Bandai.
Wizardry Schema	July 29, 2014 (iPhone)	—N/a	—N/a
Notes: Also ported to Android devices.; Services ended in June 29, 2017.
Wizrogue: Labyrinth of Wizardry	December 22, 2014 (Android)	February 24, 2017 (PC)	February 24, 2017 (PC)
Notes: Fourth Japanese spin-off to be officially translated to English and released in North America.; Implements an isometric, Roguelike system instead of the traditional first-person elements of Wizardry.; Had "free to play" and "stamina" elements common to smartphone RPGs.; Also ported to iOS devices.; The original Android and iOS versions have been discontinued, and cannot be played anymore.; In 2017, the game was translated to English and made available worldwide through the Steam digital distribution platform; this version implements a more traditional "buy once" business model instead of the stamina and free-to-play elements.; The Android version was re-released under the same "buy once" model in 2017.; An arcade version titled Wizrogue: Labyrinth of Wizardry – Samayoeru Meiō (彷徨える冥王) was planned, but eventually cancelled.

==== Standalone Japanese games ====
Title	Original release date		
Title	Japan	North America	PAL region
Wizardry Chronicle	March 23, 2001 (PC)	—N/a	—N/a
Wizardry Summoner	December 21, 2001 (Game Boy Advance)	—N/a	—N/a
Notes: Ported to the PlayStation 2 with enhanced 3D dungeon graphics and new music (2005).
Wizardry Variants Daphne	October 15, 2024 (iOS, Android)	October 15, 2024 (iOS, Android)	October 15, 2024 (iOS, Android)
Notes: First-person mobile dungeon crawler featuring full 3D character models and environments.; Initially to be released in 2022 for iOS and Android worldwide, later Drecom postponed to fiscal year ending of March 2023, and later decided on October along with pre-registration starting on August.; Tentatively known as Wizardry VA. The official full title was unveiled as Wizardry Variants: Daphne.; The closed beta test was announced in September 22, 2023 only in Japan with the addition of PC Steam version being currently developed. Its testing period started on October 10 lasted within 9 days.; The Steam version was launched on March 6, 2025 after maintenance and version 1.4.10 update.
Wizlite: Everybody loved RPGs	December 19, 2024 (PC)	December 19, 2024 (PC)	December 19, 2024 (PC)
Notes: An indie game being officially licensed by Wizardry IP.; Launches Early Access on December 19, 2024.

==== Japan-only mobile games ====
Due to the nature of the Japanese mobile system, English localisations of the following games are unlikely.

Title	Original release date		
Title	Japan	North America	PAL region
Monthly Wizardry: Shōnen-Ō no Yūutsu	March 1, 2002 (Mobile phones)	—N/a	—N/a
Notes: First of a two-part episodic series.; Also known as Getsugaku Wizardry Scenario I (月額ウィザードリィ シナリオI).; Shōnen-Ō no Yūutsu (少年王の憂鬱) translates to "Melancholy of the Young King".; Available for users of EZweb and J-Sky mobile services.
Monthly Wizardry: Andēru no Mori no Shin'nyū-sha	October 15, 2003 (Mobile phones)	—N/a	—N/a
Notes: Second of a two-part episodic series.; Also known as Getsugaku Wizardry Scenario II (月額ウィザードリィ シナリオII).; Andēru no Mori no Shin'nyū-sha (アンデールの森の侵入者) translates to "Intruders of the Annedale Forest".; Available for users of the Vodafone mobile service.
DoCoMo Wizardry 1–1: Baitokku Īhai no Hokora	December 1, 2003 (Mobile phones)	—N/a	—N/a
Notes: Available for users of the services provided by NTT DoCoMo in Japan.; First part in a series of six chapters.; Baitokku Īhai no Hokora (バイトック・イーハイの祠) translates to "Shrine of Bytek Irhai".
DoCoMo Wizardry 1–2: Nazo no Chika Iseki	February 2, 2004 (Mobile phones)	—N/a	—N/a
Notes: Available for users of the services provided by NTT DoCoMo in Japan.; Second part in a series of six chapters.; Nazo no Chika Iseki (謎の地下遺跡) translates to "Mystery of the Underground Ruins".
DoCoMo Wizardry 1–3: Fushi Ryū no Shinden	March 1, 2004 (Mobile phones)	—N/a	—N/a
Notes: Available for users of the services provided by NTT DoCoMo in Japan.; Third part in a series of six chapters.; Fushi Ryū no Shinden (不死竜の神殿) translates to "Temple of the Immortal Dragon".
Wizardry Traditional I: Jū-ni Shinshō	May 12, 2004 (Mobile phones)	—N/a	—N/a
Notes: First of a two-part episodic series.; Also known as "Wizardry Traditional: Twelve of a Kind".; The full Japanese title is ウィザードリィ トラディショナル1 十二神将.
Wizardry Traditional II: Gekkō no Saji	June 16, 2004 (Mobile phones)	—N/a	—N/a
Notes: Second of a two-part episodic series.; Also known as "Wizardry Traditional: Grace of the Moonspoon".; The full Japanese title is ウィザードリィ トラディショナル2 月光の匙.
DoCoMo Wizardry 2–1: Īdisu no Tō	June 7, 2004 (Mobile phones)	—N/a	—N/a
Notes: Available for users of the services provided by NTT DoCoMo in Japan.; Fourth part in a series of six chapters.; Īdisu no Tō (イーディスの塔) translates to "Tower of Edith".
DoCoMo Wizardry 2–2: Shin'en no Rīdo Seresuto-gō	July 20, 2004 (Mobile phones)	—N/a	—N/a
Notes: Available for users of the services provided by NTT DoCoMo in Japan.; Fifth part in a series of six chapters.; Shin'en no Rīdo Seresuto-gō (深淵のリードセレスト号) translates to "The Issue of the Abyss of Lead Celest".
DoCoMo Wizardry 2–3: Īdisu no Tō Jōsō-bu	September 13, 2004 (Mobile phones)	—N/a	—N/a
Notes: Available for users of the services provided by NTT DoCoMo in Japan.; Final part in a series of six chapters.; Īdisu no Tō Jōsō-bu (イーディスの塔上層部), translated as "Upper Part of the Tower of Edith".

== Reception ==
The original Wizardry game was a success, selling 24,000 copies by June 1982, just nine months after its release according to Softalk's sales surveys. In the June 1983 issue of Electronic Games, Wizardry was described as "without a doubt, the most popular fantasy adventure game for the Apple II at the present time". While noting limitations such as the inability to divide the party, or the emphasis on combat over role-playing, the magazine stated that "no other game comes closer to providing the type of contest favored by most players of non-electronic role-playing games... one outstanding programming achievement, and an absolute 'must buy' for those fantasy gamers who own an Apple". In the May–June 1982, issue of Computer Gaming World, the reviewer praised Wizardry as setting a standard by which all fantasy role playing games should be compared to, and call it an all time classic. The series had sold over 1.5 million copies by 1987, 2 million by 1991, and over 5 million by 1996.

Spin-offs originally released in Japan received generally positive reviews in North America. GameSpot reviewed Wizardry: Tale of the Forsaken Land in 2002, and awarded it a score of 8.5 out of 10. In 2011, Wizardry: Labyrinth of Lost Souls was also reviewed by GameSpot and received a score of 7.5 out of 10. In Japan, readers of Famitsu magazine considered the Famicom port of the original Wizardry I to be one of the 100 best games of all time. The series was ranked as the 60th top game (collectively) by Next Generation in 1996. They cited the huge dungeons with elaborate quests and tons of differing enemies. Fans of the series included Robin Williams, Harry Anderson, and the Crown Prince of Bahrain; the latter even called Sir-Tech on the phone.

== Legacy ==
=== Innovation in gameplay ===
Together with the Ultima series, Wizardry established the conventions of role-playing video games. The command-driven battle system with a still image of the monster being fought would be emulated in later games, such as The Bard's Tale, Dragon Slayer, Shining Force, Fire Emblem, Dragon Quest, and Final Fantasy. The party-based combat in Wizardry also inspired Richard Garriott to include a similar party-based system in Ultima III: Exodus. Other user interface elements were influential in Japanese role-playing games. The later Wizardry games implemented multiple endings, some of which were only accessible to people who imported characters from previous games.

Wizardry features what would later be called prestige classes. Aside from the traditional character classes, such as fighter, players could take more advanced ones that combined the abilities of multiple classes if they had the right attributes and alignment. In the early Wizardry games, some classes were inaccessible during character creation due to the high requirements; this meant the player needed to first gain levels and then change their class. Wizardry VI allowed starting with any class if the player invested enough time during the random character attribute generation.

=== Influence on subsequent games ===
Wizardry inspired many clones and served as a template for role-playing video games. Some notable series that trace their look and feel to Wizardry include 1985's The Bard's Tale and the Might and Magic series. The specific Wizardry formula, that of a turn based RPG taking place primarily in a dungeon via first person exploration, is referred to as a dungeon crawl.

Wizardry is the major inspiration to the Nintendo DS title The Dark Spire. While the game follows its own story and maps, much of the game uses the same game play mechanics, even going so far as including a "classic" mode that removes all of the game's graphics, replacing them with a wireframe environment, 8-bit-style sprites for monsters and characters, and chiptune music. The game's publisher, Atlus, also published another Wizardry spin-off, Wizardry: Tale of the Forsaken Land.

While designing the popular Japanese role-playing game Dragon Quest, Yuji Horii drew inspiration from the Wizardry series, 1986's Mugen no Shinzou (Heart of Phantasm), and the Ultima series of games. Horii's obsession with Wizardry was manifested as an easter egg in one of his earlier games, The Portopia Serial Murder Case in 1983. In a dungeon-crawling portion of that adventure game, a note on the wall reads "MONSTER SURPRISED YOU".

Wizardry's legacy continued in Japan after the parent company ended, with titles such as Wizardry Gaiden, Wizardry Empire, and Wizardry XTH, being developed after the original games were released and generally keeping the same tropes, themes, and mechanics.

Notably Wizardry XTH: Academy of Frontier swapped the original's Gothic themes for a modern day military school setting, adding item crafting and party member compatibility to the Wizardry formula. Much like the original Wizardry, XTH spawned a direct storyline sequel, Wizardry XTH: Unlimited Students. The second XTH game was used as the basis for and shared code with Class of Heroes, which swapped the modern science fiction elements for a combination of High School, High Fantasy, and Anime aesthetics. Class of Heroes would go on to spawn several sequels and spinoffs itself.

Following the shutdown of Michaelsoft, the director of Wizardry XTH, Motoya Ataka took a group of programmers he called "Team Muramasa" that had worked on Empire and XTH and went on to found Experience Inc., creating a series of PC games with Wizardry XTH's mechanics called Generation Xth. These would later be ported to the PlayStation Vita, their ports localized as Operation Abyss and Operation Babel. Experience would go on to create several other DRPGs using Wizardry's mechanics as a starting point, including Students of the Round, Stranger of Sword City, and Demon Gaze.

Starfish, the development team behind Wizardry Empire, would later go on to create Elminage, a series of DRPGs that retained the original Gothic aesthetic (and difficulty) of the western Wizardry games. Elminage was notable for using the expanded "kemonojin" races from Wizardry Asterisk, also by Starfish, as well as the summoner class from Wizardry: Summoner —these included "Were-Beast", "Dragonnewt", "Fairy", and "Devilkin" as well as expanded classes such as "Brawler" (a hand to hand melee specialist), "Alchemist" (a combination crafting class and spellcaster), and "Summoner" (a spellcasting class that can tame and summon monsters from the dungeon). These "expanded" Japanese Wizardry mechanics would be reused in future Elminage games as well as notably Class of Heroes.

After cancellation of Wizardry: Stones of Arnhem in the mid 1990s, one of the developers, Cleveland Mark Blakemore, started work on the game Grimoire: Heralds of the Winged Exemplar which is heavily inspired by Wizardry. It was eventually released in August 2017.

=== Wizardry Renaissance ===
In 2009, several Japanese publishers and development teams started a "Brand Revitalization plan", which they called the "Wizardry Renaissance". After Sir-Tech, the original Wizardry creator in the US, was dissolved, several semi-official games were created in Japan of varying quality and thematic elements. "Wizardry Renaissance" aimed to "rebuild" the brand by agreeing to a certain "worldview" and quality standards to these semi-official Wizardry games.

Wizardry Renaissance titles include:

- Wizardry Online, a PC MMORPG, shut down in 2016.
- Wizardry: Torawareshi Tamashii no Meikyū, a PlayStation 3, iOS, Vita, and PC RPG (localized in the West as Wizardry: Labyrinth of Lost Souls).
- Wizardry: Seimei no Kusabi, a Nintendo DS title.
- Wizardry: Bōkyaku no Isan, a Nintendo DS title, which re-used elements from Seimei no Kusabi.
- Wizardry Online Mobile, a mobile phone MMORPG, shut down in 2011.
- Wizardry: Torawareshi Bōrei no Machi, a PlayStation 3 RPG.
- Tōkyō Meikyū – Wizardry 0, a social-networking card-battle RPG using the Mobage service on smartphones, shut down sometime in 2012.
- Wizardry: Senran no Matō, a social-networking RPG for smartphones, shut down in 2015.
- Wizardry Schema, an incremental game RPG for smartphones, shut down in 2017.
- Wizrogue: Labyrinth of Wizardry, an isometric roguelike RPG with gacha game elements, originally shut down in 2015, it was re-launched in 2017 with the gacha elements removed.

These titles were released from late 2009 to 2016; the latest activity is the port of Wizardry: Labyrinth of Lost Souls to the PC in January 2020.

=== Related media ===
The popularity of Wizardry in Japan also inspired various light novels, manga comics, Japanese pen-and-paper role-playing games, and an original video animation, produced by TMS Entertainment. A particularly famous example of these can be found in the form of Sword Art Online.
