= Sir-Tech =

Canadian-American video game developer and publisher

Sir-Tech Software, Inc.
- Formerly: Sirotech Software
- Industry: Video games
- Founded: 1979; 47 years ago
- Founder: Norman Sirotek; Robert Sirotek; Robert Woodhead
- Defunct: 2003
- Products: Wizardry series Jagged Alliance series

Sir-Tech Software, Inc. was a video game developer and publisher based in the United States and Canada.

== History ==
In fall 1979, Sirotech Software was founded by Norman Sirotek, Fred Sirotek and Robert Woodhead. Sirotech Software published Info Tree, a database management program, Galactic Attack and a beta version of Wizardry: Dungeons of Despair which was later renamed Wizardry: Proving Grounds of the Mad Overlord and formally released in fall 1981. It was the first game in the Wizardry series.

In spring 1981, Sir-Tech Software, Inc was incorporated as a video game developer and publisher in the United States.

In 1998, Sir-Tech USA closed. The Canadian counterpart, Sirtech Canada Limited, continued to operate until late 2003.

Sir-Tech is best known for Wizardry, the role-playing video game series. The Jagged Alliance series, first published by Sir-Tech in 1994, became a popular franchise. The third game in the series, Jagged Alliance 2, was still available from its current publisher 15 years after its initial release.

== Games ==
=== Developed and published ===
- Info Tree (1979) (as Sirotech)
- Galactic Attack (1980) (as Sirotech)
- Wizardry: Proving Grounds of the Mad Overlord (1981)
- Wizardry II: The Knight of Diamonds (1982)
- Wizardry III: Legacy of Llylgamyn (1983)
- Crypt of Medea (1984)
- Rescue Raiders (1984)
- Deep Space: Operation Copernicus (1986)
- Wizardry IV: The Return of Werdna (1987)
- Wizardry V: Heart of the Maelstrom (1988)
- The Usurper: The Mines of Qyntarr (1989)
- Wizardry VI: Bane of the Cosmic Forge (1990)
- Freakin' Funky Fuzzballs (1990)
- Wizardry VII: Crusaders of the Dark Savant (1992)
- Jagged Alliance: Deadly Games (1996)
- Nemesis: The Wizardry Adventure (1996)
- Wizardry Gold (1996)
- Wizardry 8 (2001)

=== Developed only ===
- Jagged Alliance 2 (1999)
- Jagged Alliance 2: Unfinished Business (2000)

=== Published only ===
- Star Maze (1982)
- The Seven Spirits of Ra (1987)
- Realms of Arkania: Blade of Destiny (1993)
- Realms of Arkania: Star Trail (1994)
- Druid: Daemons of the Mind (1995)
- Jagged Alliance (1995)
- Fable (1996)
- 20th Century Trivia Challenge (1997)
- Armed & Delirious (1997)
- Excalibur 2555 AD (1997)
- Virus: The Game (1997)
- Realms of Arkania: Shadows over Riva (1997)

=== Canceled ===
- Wizardry: Stones of Arnhem (1994)
