= Wizardry: Proving Grounds of the Mad Overlord =

1981 video game

- Apple II cover
- Developers: Sir-Tech (original); Game Studio (NES)
- Publishers: Sir-Tech (original); Nexoft (NES)
- Designers: Andrew C. Greenberg; Robert Woodhead
- Series: Wizardry
- Platforms: Apple II, Commodore 64, Commodore 128, FM-7, Game Boy Color, Macintosh, MSX2, NEC PC-9801, NES, IBM PC, Sharp X1, Super Famicom, TurboGrafx-16, Windows, Nintendo Switch
- Release: September 1981: Apple II; NA: 1980 (beta); NA: September 1981 PC booter; NA: 1984 FM-7; JP: November 1985 PC-98; JP: November 15, 1985 PC-88; JP: December 1985 Mac; NA: December 1985 Sharp X1; JP: January 1986 Commodore 64; NA: 1987 MSX2; JP: 1987 NES; JP: December 22, 1987; NA: July 1990 TurboGrafx-CD; JP: July 23, 1993 Super Famicom; JP: June 1, 1999 Game Boy Color; JP: February 23, 2001 WonderSwan Color; JP: March 1, 2003
- Genre: Role-playing
- Mode: Single-player

Wizardry: Proving Grounds of the Mad Overlord is the first game in the Wizardry series of role-playing video games. It was developed by Andrew C. Greenberg and Robert Woodhead. In 1980, Norman Sirotek formed Sir-Tech Software and launched a beta version of the product at the 1980 Boston Computer Convention. The final version of the game was released in 1981.

The game was one of the first Dungeons & Dragons-style role-playing games to be written for computer play, and the first such game to offer color graphics. It was also the first true party-based role-playing video game. It is now listed among the best video games of all time.

The game ended up as the first of a trilogy that also included Wizardry II: The Knight of Diamonds and Wizardry III: Legacy of Llylgamyn.

A 3D remake of the game was released by Digital Eclipse for Windows and game consoles on May 23, 2024.

== Gameplay ==
Starting in the town, which is represented only as a text-based menu, the player creates a party of up to six characters from an assortment of five possible races (Humans, Elves, Dwarves, Gnomes, Hobbits), three alignments (Good, Neutral, Evil), and four basic classes (Fighter, Priest, Mage, Thief), with four elite classes (Bishop: priest and mage spells; Samurai: fighter with mage spells; Lord: fighter with priest spells, and Ninja: fighter with thief abilities) unlocked once the characters have progressed sufficiently. Good and evil characters normally cannot be assigned to the same party.

After characters are equipped with basic armor and weaponry, the party descends into the dungeon below Trebor's castle. This consists of a maze of ten levels, each progressively more challenging than the last. Magic-using classes can learn spells from seven tiers of increasingly powerful magic as they advance in level.

The style of play employed in this game has come to be termed a dungeon crawl. The goal, as in most subsequent role-playing video games, is to find treasure including ever more potent items, gain levels of experience by killing monsters, then face the evil arch-wizard Werdna on the bottom level and retrieve a powerful amulet. The goal of most levels is to find the elevator or stairs going down to the next level without being killed in the process.

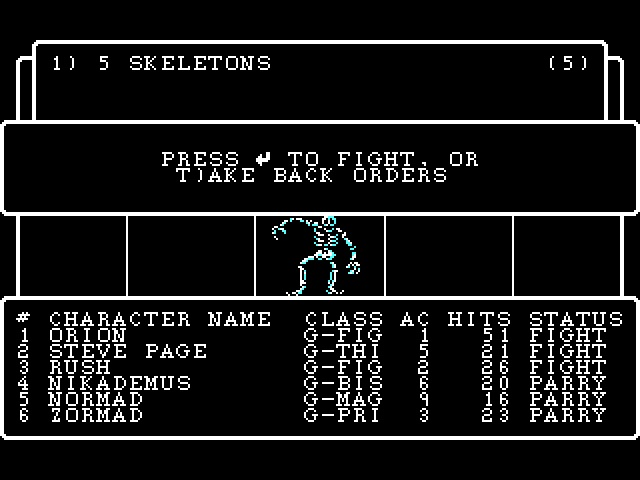
Screenshot of Wizardry for the IBM PC on level 1 of the maze

The graphics of the original game are extremely simple by today's standards; most of the screen is occupied by text, with about 10% devoted to a first-person view of the dungeon maze using line graphics. By the standards of the day, however, the graphics improved on the text-only games that had been far more common. When monsters are encountered, the dungeon maze disappears, replaced by a picture of one of the monsters. Combat is against from 1 to 4 groups of monsters. The game's lack of an automap feature, which had not been invented at the time of its release, practically forces the player to draw the map for each level on graph paper (included in the box) as they walk through the 20x20 dungeon maze, step by step – failing to do this often results in becoming permanently lost, as there are many locations in the maze that have a permanent "Darkness" spell upon the square (making the player walk blindly) or a "Teleport" spell sending the player to a new location. A magic spell can be used to determine the current location of the party, and at higher levels there is a teleport spell that can be used to quickly transition between the maze levels. Care is necessary when teleporting as the player must enter both the level and coordinates to teleport to (the number of steps north, south, east, or west from his current location) and it is easily possible to land in a trap or solid stone, ending the game. The original releases of Wizardry also do not announce that the player has teleported and play resumes as if one step forward was taken.

The game has unforgiving difficulty as players cannot save their progress within the dungeon; they must exit the dungeon first. In the event of a total party kill, play cannot be resumed; however, a new party may recover the bodies and items of dead adventurers. Later Wizardry games made it easier by restarting at the point in the dungeon where the characters died. It can take hundreds of hours to finish the game.

Wizardry saves the player's party and game progress onto a scenario disk. After booting, a new one may be created with a blank floppy disk or an existing one used. Completion of Proving Grounds of the Mad Overlord allows a player to export the winning party to Wizardry II and III.

== Development ==
Andrew Greenberg, then a Cornell University student, began the project's development in 1978, and the game was in an early playable state by fall 1979, when it became popular among fellow students. Wizardry drew influences from earlier games from the PLATO system, most notably the 1977 role-playing game Oubliette. It was initially coded in Applesoft BASIC, but Greenberg and Woodhead rewrote it in UCSD Pascal after BASIC proved too slow to be playable. They had to wait for a run-time system, not available until early 1981, before publishing it. The game took two and a half man-years to complete, but the delay benefited Wizardry by permitting almost one year of playtesting and game balancing before release, distinguishing it from others such as Ultima I. Frederick Sirotek, Norman's businessman father and the company's financier, insisted that the packaging and documentation be professional, also distinguishing the game from others sold in Ziploc bags.

The Commodore 64/128 versions of Wizardry 1-3 share a common code base with the Apple originals, as they all use the same run-time 6502 Pascal interpreter which provides support for overlays and low-level functions to interface with the hardware. UCSD Pascal was also used for the IBM versions, but with an x86 version of the interpreter.

Lengthy load time and extensive disk access was a problem with Wizardry; however, the Commodore versions, which particularly suffer from this, provided a variety of workarounds. In C128 mode, the VDC memory is used to store overlays and REUs are supported in both C64 and C128 mode. Wizardry 2-5 also detect if 16k or 64k of VDC memory is present and can use the 1571 drive's burst mode for faster load time.

"Werdna" and "Trebor" are Greenberg and Woodhead's first names spelled backwards. Their names also appear as initials (i.e., ACG and RJW) on the map of the eighth and ninth floors.

Sir-Tech published Wizardry, Revision 2 in 1982, which included new features. John M. Morrison for The Space Gamer No. 50 commented that "By this time, your old disk should be wearing out. I definitely recommend sending the $5 in to transfer backup characters, as you'll get Revision 2 to boot."

A 3D remake of the game was released by Digital Eclipse in early access on September 15, 2023, for Windows computers, followed by a full release for Windows and game consoles on May 23, 2024. Besides an audio-visual overhaul, the game also features quality-of-life improvements.

== Reception and legacy ==
Reception

Review scores
| Publication | Score |
|---|---|
| Electronic Gaming Monthly | NES: 4/10, 7/10, 3/10, 3/10 |
| Famitsu | 8/10, 9/10, 6/10, 9/10 (FC) |
| GamePro | NES: 20/25 |
| Computers Games | Classic |

Wizardry was a major commercial success. It shipped in September 1981 and almost immediately became a hit, the most popular Apple II game of the year. By 30 June 1982 it had sold 24,000 copies, making it one of the best-selling computer RPGs in North America up until that time. In comparison, Temple of Apshai (1979) had sold 30,000 copies and Ultima (1981) had sold 20,000 copies at the time. Electronic Games described Wizardry in 1983 as "without a doubt, the most popular fantasy adventure game for the Apple II at the present time." Wizardry sold 200,000 copies in its first three years, outselling the original Ultima during that time. Based on sales and market-share data, Video magazine listed Wizardry tenth on its list of best selling video games in February 1985, and ninth on the best seller list in March 1985, with II Computing listing Wizardry third on its list of top Apple II games as of October–November 1985 (behind Zork and Sargon III, and ahead of Zaxxon and Ultima III). In 1989, Video Games & Computer Entertainment reported that Wizardry had sold "well over 500,000 copies".

Within months of Wizardry's release, at least two commercial game trainers for it appeared, despite Sir-Tech denouncing their use. The game also had perhaps the first strategy guide, The Wizisystem, which promised that "the average player" could succeed in the game with "a successful, easy-to-follow format". A child psychiatrist reported success in using the game as therapy. The game eventually led to a series of eight games spanning twenty years, and helped set genre standards with its intuitive layout and interface.

In Issue 46 of The Space Gamer, Forrest Johnson commented, "Wizardry represents a leap in computer game design. It is certainly the best D&D-style computer game on the market".

In Issue 65 of Dragon, Bruce Humphrey noted, "There is so much good about this game, it's difficult to decide where to begin", and concluded by describing it as "not easily beaten or solved, I recommend it to anyone tired of mediocre programs and ho-hum dungeon encounters."

Computer Gaming World praised it as "one of the all-time classic computer games", complex yet playable. With no major faults, the only minor one described in the review is the ease with which parties can initially be killed.

In Issue 19 of the Australian wargaming magazine Queensland Wargamer, Kevin Flynn commented, "All in all I have found Wizardry to be the most enjoyable dungeon adventure or mixed text & graphics game I have played, with the later scenarios especially being interesting and challenging."

In early 1985, Computer Games magazine called Wizardry the "all-time tops in role-playing entertainment."

In Issue 110 of Dragon, Hartley and Pattie Lesser reviewed the Macintosh version of the game, known by fans as "MacWizardry", in their "The Role of Computers" column. The Lessers called MacWizardry "a delightful reintroduction of a marvelous classic." In a subsequent column, the Lessers gave the Mac version of the game 4 out of 5 stars.

Jerry Pournelle named it the game of the month for August 1985, and one of two games of the month for March 1986, in his "Chaos Manor" column for Byte magazine. He wrote "I don't know what the fascination of Wizardry I is; if I describe it in objective terms, it seems boring — which it certainly is not, as witness the time it has eaten this month".

Macworld commented that the Macintosh port's conversion to the Classic Mac OS mouse-driven graphical user interface enhanced the game's charm and streamlined its gameplay; the game mediates actions through "such familiar Macintosh devices as windows, alert boxes, icons, scrolling lists, and so on."

Macworld inducted Wizardry into its inaugural Game Hall of Fame as Best Role-Playing Game, ahead of runner-up Xyphus.

The Wizardry series was ported to various Japanese computers such as the NEC PC-8801 and became popular there. Along with Ultima, it inspired RPG series like Dragon Quest and Final Fantasy.

In 1984, Softline readers named the game the most popular Apple program of all time.

The game was the top-rated adventure for five years in Computer Gaming World's reader poll, until Ultima IV replaced it in 1986, and with a score of 7.69 out of 10, in 1988 Wizardry was among the first members of the magazine's Hall of Fame, honoring those games rated highly over time by readers, as the magazine's 1982 review predicted.

In 1990 the game received the ninth-highest number of votes in a survey of Computer Gaming World readers' "All-Time Favorites", and in 1991 and 1993 the magazine's Scorpia wrote that "while mainly hack-and-slash, it's still a grand expedition, even today". In 1996, the magazine named Wizardry the 16th best game ever. The editors wrote, "The seminal dungeon romp, this RPG sent AD&D fans scrambling to buy Apple IIs".

Scott Taylor for Black Gate, playing the game again as an adult, said that he was "surprised at just how tough and unforgiving the game actually was."
