= Robert Woodhead =

American entrepreneur and software engineer

- Born: 1958 or 1959 (age 67–68)
- Occupations: Entrepreneur; Software engineer Game programmer (formerly)
- Notable work: Wizardry; AnimEigo

Robert J. Woodhead (born 1958 or 1959) is an American entrepreneur, software engineer and former game programmer. He is the co-creator of the Wizardry franchise, and the co-founder of both the video game publishing company Sir-Tech and anime licensing company AnimEigo.

He claims that a common thread in his career is "doing weird things with computers".

== Career ==
In 1979, he co-founded Sirotech (later known as Sir-Tech) with Norman Sirotek and Robert Sirotek. Along with Andrew C. Greenberg, he created the Apple II game Wizardry: Proving Grounds of the Mad Overlord, one of the first role-playing video games written for a personal computer, as well as several of its sequels. Woodhead designed the 1982 Apple II arcade game Star Maze, which was programmed by Gordon Eastman and sold through Sir-Tech. He told TODAY magazine in 1983, "I have loads of arcade game ideas, but lack the patience to do the actual coding. I'm sort of a big project person; I like the challenge of a program like Wizardry."

Later, he authored Interferon and Virex, two of the earliest anti-virus applications for the Macintosh, and co-founded AnimEigo, one of the first US anime releasing companies. As a result of this venture, while living in Japan, he married his translator and interpreter, Natsumi Ueki, together with whom he has two children. He also ran a search engine promotion website called SelfPromotion.com.

As a hobby, he builds combat robots, and his children, James Ueki and Alex Ueki, are the 2004 and 2005 Robot Fighting League National Champions in the 30 lb Featherweight class.

Woodhead made a cameo appearance in the 1982 video game Ultima II as an NPC; when the player talked to him he would scream "Copy Protect!", a sarcastic reference to the extensive copy protection methods used in video games of the time. He also has a screen credit in the film Real Genius as their "Hacking Consultant".

Woodhead has created two successful Kickstarter projects, "Bubblegum Crisis Ultimate Edition Blu-Ray Set" ($153,964 pledged on a $75,000 goal), and "BackerSupport" ($326 pledged on a $100 goal).

Woodhead has also served on the Eve Online Council of Stellar Management with an in-game avatar name of Trebor Daehdoow. He was re-elected for four terms, serving in his last term as Chairman.
