= Andrew C. Greenberg =

American video game developer and patent attorney (1957–2024)

Andrew Clifford Greenberg
- Born: Andrew Clifford Greenberg; October 2, 1957
- Died: August 30, 2024 (aged 66)
- Occupations: video game developer; patent attorney
- Known for: Wizardry

Andrew Clifford Greenberg (1957 – August 28, 2024) was an American video game developer and patent attorney. He co-created Wizardry with Robert Woodhead, one of the first role-playing video games for a personal computer. He was also involved with the production of the game Q*bert and several of the later Wizardry games in the 1980s. He was a graduate of Cornell University, where he did his first work on role-playing video games. He also was a proficient tuba player.

With Rick Dutton, Walter Freitag, and Michael Massimilla he created Star Saga One: Beyond the Boundary & Star Saga: Two - The Clathran Menace, in 1988 and 1989 respectively. Both were released by Masterplay Publishing.

The name of the evil wizard in the first Wizardry game is Werdna, Andrew spelled backwards.

After working as a patent attorney with Carlton Fields, a law firm in Tampa, Florida, Andrew moved to San Francisco, California where he served as an executive and general counsel for a renewable energy company. Greenberg was a past Chairman of the Intellectual Property Committee for the IEEE, and has received the Institute's National Citation of Honor.

Greenberg had married Sheila McDonald, a play-tester of the Wizardry series, and had two children. Robert Woodhead and David Mullich reported that Greenberg died on August 30, 2024, at the age of 66.
