= List of Strategy First games =

This is a list of video games published by the video game publisher Strategy First.

Title	Genre(s)	Release date	Platform(s)
1914 Shells of Fury	Simulation	NA: August 14, 2007	Windows
688(I) Hunter/Killer	Submarine simulator	4 July 1997	Windows
Alien Shooter: Vengeance	Top-down shooter	February 16, 2007	Microsoft Windows; Cloud (OnLive)
Birth of America	Turn-based strategy	2006	Windows

== C ==
- Call for Heroes: Pompolic Wars
- Celtic Kings: Rage of War
- Chariots of War
- Chrome
- Clans
- Clusterball
- Cops 2170: The Power of Law
- Cuban Missile Crisis: The Aftermath
- Culpa Innata
- cloud Raiders

== D ==
- Dangerous Waters
- Diggles: The Myth of Fenris
- Disciples: Sacred Lands (Gold Edition)
- Disciples II: Dark Prophecy
- Disciples III: Renaissance
- Dragon Throne: Battle of Red Cliffs
- Ducati World Championship

== E ==
- Earth 2150: Lost Souls
- Emergency 3
- Empire of the Ants
- Etherlords
- Etherlords II
- Europa Universalis
- Europa Universalis II
- Europa Universalis: Crown of the North

== F ==
- FlatOut 3: Chaos & Destruction
- FlatOut 4: Total Insanity
- Fleet Command
- Football Deluxe

== G ==
- Galactic Civilizations
- Galactic Civilizations: Altarian Prophecy
- Galactic Dream: Rage of War
- Gods: Lands of Infinity
- Great Invasions
- Gun Metal

== H ==
- Hearts of Iron

== I ==
- I of the Dragon
- Inquisition
- Iron Warriors: T-72 Tank Commander
- Ironclads: American Civil War

== J ==
- Jack Keane
- Jagged Alliance
- Jagged Alliance 2
- Jagged Alliance 2: Wildfire

== K ==
- Kohan: Ahriman's Gift
- Kohan: Immortal Sovereigns
- Konung: Legends of the North

== L ==
- Legion Arena
- Legion Gold

== M ==
- Making History: The Calm & The Storm
- Micro Commandos
- Mistmare

== N ==
- New World Order

== O ==
- O.R.B: Off-World Resource Base

== P ==
- Perimeter 2: New Earth
- Platoon
- Prince of Qin

== R ==
- Rails Across America
- Robin Hood: The Legend of Sherwood

== S ==
- Seal of Evil
- Space Empires IV
- Space Empires V
- Space Empires: Star Fury
- Steel Beasts
- Strike Fighters: Project 1
- Sub Command
- Submarine Titans
- Sudden Strike
- Supreme Ruler 2010
- Solid Ice

== T ==
- Time of Defiance
- Timelines: Assault on America
- The Outforce
- The Partners
- Two Thrones

== U ==
- Uplink: Hacker Elite

== V ==
- Vendetta Online
- Victoria: An Empire Under the Sun

== W ==
- War Times
- Warrior Kings: Battles

== Cancelled ==
- Zero-G Marines
