= SE5 =

SE5 may refer to:

- Ranggung LRT station, Singapore
- Royal Aircraft Factory S.E.5, a British fighter plane of the First World War
- SE5, a postcode district in the SE postcode area of London
- Sniper Elite 5, a video game
- Space Empires V, a video game
