= Star Fury =

Star Fury or Starfury or variant, may refer to:

- Space Empires: Starfury, a 2003 videogame set in the Space Empires universe
- Starfury, a military spacecraft in the Babylon 5 franchise
- Starfury, a sword in Terraria
