= Girls' Frontline: Neural Cloud =

2021 roguelike video game

Neural Cloud
- Persicaria as the Poster Girl for the app's icon
- Developer: Shanghai Sunborn Network Technology Limited Company (散爆网络)
- Publishers: Mainland China, Japan: Shanghai Sunborn Network Technology Limited Company; Taiwan: Peiyu Digital Entertainment (沛羽數位娛樂)
- Director: Yuzhong (羽中)
- Producer: Kamie (卡咩)
- Composer: Vanguard Sound
- Series: Girls' Frontline
- Engine: Unity
- Platforms: Android, iOS
- Release: Mainland China: September 23, 2021 Global: November 21, 2022 Taiwan and Hong Kong: November 23, 2022 Japan: November 24, 2022
- Genres: Roguelike, war game, gacha game, strategy role-playing game

Girls' Frontline: Neural Cloud (Chinese: 少女前线：云图计划; pinyin: Shàonǚ qiánxiàn: Yúntú jìhuà) is a roguelike strategy game from Shanghai Sunborn Network Technology Limited Company (Chinese: 散爆网络; pinyin: Sàn bào wǎngluò) and Mica Team. It is a spin-off from Girls' Frontline, released for public beta on September 23, 2021.

The protagonist is a professor who leads a group of dolls called "The Exiles" that look very similar to humans, but live in a digital world called Magrasea.

== Gameplay ==
Girls' Frontline: Neural Cloud uses two gameplay modes: Auto-chess and roguelike. It also features elements of simulation development. The professor, the protagonist character, needs to lead the dolls to fight against enemies called "Sanctifiers". The battle is organized as an auto-chess combat. Thus, players cannot control the characters directly in battle, but they can use a variety of methods to provide support.

== Plot ==
The story of the Girls' Frontline: Project Neural Cloud takes place four years before the main storyline of Girls' Frontline and tells the story of the development of the "Neural Cloud" system used to back up the minds of "Tactical Dolls" in Girls' Frontline. The world view of the story is related to Girls' Frontline, but it is also relatively independent.

In 2045, due to the intensified conflicts between countries, the Third World War broke out and ended 6 years later. After the war, a large number of areas in the world were polluted by Collapse radiation. The demand for the utilization and development of polluted areas directly promoted the advancement of machine and artificial intelligence technology.

In 2053, veteran Kryuger founded Griffin Military Security Contractors. In the same year, quantum technology research institution 42Lab and IOP Company reached an in-depth cooperation in the field of Dolls research to jointly develop the next generation of "Dolls", It is the collective name for a specific type of robots that were developed in 2033. They are androids that look very similar to humans and are extremely intelligent.

In 2057, 42Lab launched the "Neural Cloud" project, which aims to upload the neural data of Dolls to the super cloud server "Magrasea " for backup, and select various Dolls to participate in the project through cooperation with major companies and research institutions. However, in 2060, when 42Lab conducted its first large-scale formal test and uploaded the Dolls minds to the cloud, an accident known as the "Wipe-off Incident" occurred, The Incident displaced the Neural Cloud Sector and disconnected all participating Dolls' neural clouds from their bodies, scattering them into unknown locations in the "Magrasea".

In 2063, the player plays the role of Griffin's commander. Entrusted by Dr. Persica, he borrows the authority and identity of the Professor, the leader of the "Project Neural Cloud", to upload his consciousness to the "Magrasea" cloud server, retrieve all lost Dolls' neural cloud, and explore the truth behind the Neural Cloud Project.

== Lore ==
=== Project Neural Cloud ===
In 2057, A research project that was spearheaded by 42Lab. With the goal of lowering costs in Doll manufacturing by creating back ups of their Neural clouds, ultimately preserving their data even when their Bodies are damaged. This Project is run with Magrasea's support. Collaborating with many large corporations, to qualify, Dolls are selected through public screening along with other methods to participate. Trials officially began in 2060, when the Dolls' neural clouds were uploaded en masse to Magrasea for experimentations.

=== Wipe-off Incident ===
This was a major incident that occurred during an official test run of Project Neural Cloud. The event displaced the Neural Cloud Sector along with disconnecting all participating Dolls' neural clouds from their physical mechanical bodies, effectively scattering them into unknown locations all over the Magrasea.

=== Magrasea ===
Was first conceptualized In 2053 by 42Lab. Magrasea is a super cloud server that was fully developed and entered into public service in 2057. Utilizing 42Lab's Cutting edge AI technology, the AI programs in Magrasea, are identified as "Resident Agents", these help the users with different tasks like hi-efficiency cloud computing, data processing etc. along with the "Sanctifiers" safeguarding the server by providing effective and comprehensive protection. From large corporations, to government, to single individuals can all rent Magrasea's services for data processing and other operations in the corresponding sectors within the server.

=== 42 Lab ===
An AI and quantum technology research institute that emerged when AI and robotics became all the rage. 42 Lab's headquarters used to be in Maryland, USA until they relocated to Eastern Europe after WWIII. The institute specializes in 4 scientific disciplines mainly: bionic autonomous Doll body, AI and neural cloud, quantum communications and quantum computing.

=== Sectors ===
Developed by 42 Lab. these are the units that constitute the Magrasea super cloud server. Different types of data from myriads of Corporations are stored in the different sectors within Magrasea . Each individual sector has a different function from the other and stores the corresponding data type, along with "Resident Agents" within each that carry out the corresponding tasks, Due to the differences in the type of data stored within each sector, it manifest in a variety of manners. Ultimately making each sector unique. In human terms, the sectors in Magrasea look like individual city-states.

=== Oasis ===
The Oasis is a sector opened by the Professor(player) using the privileges as the person-in-charge of Project Neural Cloud. It is also serves as the operation base and home of the Exiles within Magrasea. Because of the joint efforts of the Professor and the Exiles, the Oasis is thriving and growing.

=== Exiles ===
Due to an incident that occurred during a test, the neural clouds of the Dolls who took part in Project Neural Cloud got scattered across the Magrasea super cloud server. When the Dolls in their neural cloud form reawakened after a three-year hibernation, found themselves being hunted down by the Sanctifiers. The Professor(player) entrusted by Dr. Perscia came to Magrasea, in search for the Dolls' neural clouds, under his/her leadership with the aide of Persicaria and the other Dolls They eventually gathered, forming a faction known as the "Exiles" . Their aim is to explore this unknown virtual world, search for resources necessary for survival, and to find away back to the real world.

=== Sanctifier ===
Are anti-virus AI programs created by 42Lab with the task of Cyber security maintenance within all of Magrasea, Operating in a strict Hierarchy, they are divided into Greater, Intermediate, and Lesser ranks, unquestioningly obeying orders issued by the humans. The Greater Sanctifiers are stationed within a surveillance tower called "Reverse Babylon Tower", overlooking all of Magrasea and keeping it safe, Intermediate Sanctifiers follow commands issued by Greater Sanctifiers tasked in preventing anomalies from occurring within the different sectors, while the Lesser Sanctifiers have low Intelligence and will only comply with the instructions from the Greater and Intermediate Sanctifiers along with their Base Commands in purging viral programs and anomalous Agents that Pose a threat to the Sectors' order and integrity within Magrasea.

=== Agent ===
The term "Agent" refers to all AI programs within Magrasea, including the Resident Agents that process data in each Sector, the Sanctifiers-that serves as Magrasea's Antivirus programs, as wells as Dolls, whose neural clouds have been digitized and uploaded to Magrasea for Project Neural Cloud, etc.

=== Irregular Agents ===
Are the Sanctifiers' targets, which they refer to as "Daemons". Generally speaking, Irregular Agents can be categorized into two types; actual viruses and Agents that have developed abnormal behaviors. Since the Dolls who were forced out of the Neural Cloud Sector from the Wipe-off Incident. do not bear signatures matching the sector they are occupying, this constitutes as "abnormal behavior" in the Sanctifiers' book and renders them as targets to be hunted down.

=== Dolls ===
Officially known as "bionic autonomous Dolls for civilian use", Dolls are androids with a strong physical resemblance to humans and are equipped with sophisticated AI that can be applied to different lines of work.

=== Neural Cloud ===
A collection of data modules that contain a Doll's consciousness. Basically functioning as a Doll's "soul".

=== Neural Cloud Projections ===
The visual manifestation of a Doll in Magrasea. Since neural clouds within the Magrasea are incorporeal, a Doll's Neural Cloud Projection is determined and based on their neural data. Depending on the situation, clothing, objects, and even pets from the real world can be rendered and projected. By collecting Neural fragments and completing a Doll's neural cloud, their Neural Cloud Projection can be refined.

=== Operand ===
The Basic element that shapes Magrasea. Serving as its Building Blocks. As both material and energy, it can be used to build practically anything within Magrasea and is the Supply source that supports the agents' daily work, life and combat.

== Appearing characters ==
=== Professor ===
The role played by the player. The person in charge of Project Neural Cloud. uploaded his consciousness to the Magrasea super cloud server and led the separated Dolls to establish the "Exiles". The commander, whose actual identity is a Griffin commander, was entrusted by Dr. Persica to enter Magrasea with the authority and identity of "Professor" to investigate the secrets behind the "Wipe-off Incident" and to find a way from Magrasea to reconnect with the real world. How to connect. The whereabouts of the real professor are unknown.

=== Persicaria ===
Voice Actor: Nabo Karin

The Doll of the same name developed by Dr. Persica using herself as a template. She is a researcher at 42Lab and specializes in artificial intelligence. Now she is the professor's right-hand man, assisting in establishing "Exiles" and operating the Oasis Sector. Her appearance is almost identical to Dr. Persica, but there are many differences in personality and body shape.

=== Croque ===
Voice Actor: Yui Ogura

An engineer Doll affiliated with Svarog Heavy Industries, proficient in mechanical design. Serves as the head of the engineering bureau in the Oasis Sector. She may seem cold, but in reality She is just not good at communication.

=== Sol ===
Voice actor: Yuzuki Ryoka

A combat Doll developed by 42Lab, she serves as the guide and guard of the scientific expedition team in reality, and is now the main combatant of the "Exiles".

=== Antonina ===
Voice Actor: Juri Nagatsuma

A research Doll affiliated with the 42Lab network security department, with superb network skills. Responsible for system management and updates in the Oasis Sector and is also an expert in electronic warfare. The first person to question the identity of the "Professor" was that a professor as a researcher could not have such a high level of military command ability, and therefore concluded that the current professor was replaced by someone else. Although this fake professor of unknown origin could not be trusted, his contribution to the exiles was obvious to all, so she temporarily put aside her doubts.

== Company profiles ==
=== 42 Lab ===
Company Logo of 42 Lab

"The Leader in Computer and AI Technology."

An AI and quantum technology research institute that emerged when AI and robotics became all the rage. 42 Lab's headquarters used to be in Maryland, USA until they relocated to Eastern Europe after WWIII. The institute specializes in 4 scientific disciplines mainly: bionic autonomous Doll body, AI and neural cloud, quantum communications and quantum computing.

Company Logo of Svarog Heavy Industries

=== Svarog Heavy Industries ===
"Specializes in designing reliable industrial and combat machinery."

An old and well known corporation specializing in heavy industries that operates on a gigantic scale. Founded in Moscow, Svarog has been around for almost 70 years. They have businesses in Ordinance Manufacturing, Energy and infrastructure construction. They also have great success in Doll Manufacturing. Aside from the Traditional military droids, they have also developed many Dolls for industrial use, further paving the way for industrial intelligentization.

=== Ultimate Life Holdings ===
Company Logo of Ultimate Life Holdings

"A multinational Life Science and medical group with massive technical strengths."

A rapidly developing medical and pharmaceutical company with considerable influence in scientific fields such as genetic engineering, biopharmaceuticals, neuroscience, etc. The company was also the first to put forward medical Dolls equipped with advanced technology, making it the market leader in that niche, By collaborating with multiple scientific institutes, including 42 Lab, UltiLife has accumulated a vast amount of experience in developing AI as well, and has even proposed the concept of "digital genetics " .aiming to push Life Sciences to the "ultimate " frontier.

=== Cyber Media ===
Company Logo of Cyber Media

"The Global tycoon in entertainment, media and fashion."

An integrated media corporation.First founded in Sapporo, Japan, and has established itself firmly in the global market in less than ten years. Having businesses involved in motion pictures, animation, idol pageants, social media, digital games, traditional news printing, etc., The company provides precious mental relief for people in the postwar era. The company also founded an AI lab that specializes in developing Dolls specializing in literature, art and entertainment, further broadening the application of Dolls.

=== Universal Anything Services ===
Company Logo of Universal Anything Services

"Provides the market with service dolls that are diverse and Multidisciplinary."

The company's origins can be traced back to a pre WWIII company that operated through an exclusive membership scheme and provided custom services for members of the upper class. As businesses dwindled, along with the emergence of a market for civilian Dolls, UAS transitioned into developing Dolls and soon carved out a significant portion of the global Doll market. With businesses in all aspects of people's daily lives, UAS is now the world's largest Doll manufacturer.

== Development ==
In May 2020, at the fourth anniversary live broadcast held by Shanghai Sunborn Network Technology Limited Company for the release of Girls Frontline, producer Yu Zhong announced plans to produce four games based on the world view of Girls' Frontline, including Girls' Frontline: Neural Cloud. The official also revealed that this will be a Roguelike work with character growth and exploration elements. In October, the production team launched the first gameplay test and made adjustments based on player feedback, including reducing the difficulty of character cultivation in the game and adjusting the Gacha system. In January 2021, producer Yu Zhong said in an interview with 4Gamer that Girls' Frontline: Neural Cloud aims to be a work that is set in the past world of Girls Frontline, with relatively simple gameplay and easy for players to access . The game's development team consists of 50 people, including the core members of Girls Frontline and key members from other game companies . Starting in March 2021, the production team referred to the previous test experience and decided to accelerate iteration, optimizing the game experience every week based on the feedback from test players . On May 3, 2021, at the "Shanghai Girls Frontline Carnival-and the 5th Anniversary Celebration of Girls Frontline" held at the China Shipbuilding Museum, the production team announced that the game will provide a 3D dormitory system. The dormitory system inherits the dormitory style and DIY elements of Girls Frontline. Players can control themselves to walk in the dormitory through a virtual joystick. In August 2021, the development team decided to add a prologue to the game as a tutorial level, and further lowered the game's training requirements to allow players to advance more smoothly through the main storyline of the game.

The core gameplay of the game is Roguelike. The production team has deliberately weakened the operation cost of the battle, providing a save function in the game to facilitate players to retry the battle infinitely. The core of the battle is also fully automatic. In addition, in order to take care of players who are not familiar with the Roguelike gameplay and reduce the cost of getting started, the production team removed some of the complex gameplay in the middle and late stages, and also provided a "hard mode" for players to challenge. In terms of the game's level system design, the production team has referred to the level editor of Warcraft III: Reign of Chaos and plans to launch a tool for players to design levels by themselves. Therefore, various compatibility and scalability are considered when building the underlying framework. And each chapter will add at least one new map mechanism to keep the players fresh. In later versions, the development team added a technology tree system to the version activities, which can give players temporary gains. This design aims to lower the threshold for new players to participate in the activities. After version 2.0, the development team added a "multi-team" and "large map" mode similar to war chess.

In terms of the friend system, the systems of Girls' Frontline: Neural Cloud and Girls' Frontline are basically the same. The production team plans to use the same server for all platforms and channels in China to ensure data interoperability. After the core gameplay is perfected, player versus environment gameplay that allows players to cooperate will be designed.

In terms of art design, the production team readjusted the color schemes after receiving player feedback during the testing phase that the game's color saturation was too high. In order to highlight the image of the level boss, the production team referred to the style of massively multiplayer online role-playing games and designed independent health bars and special skills for the boss. Character designs for the game were partially handed over to the same artists who did the character designs for the original "Girls' Frontline", such as Yao Guoguo(Chinese: 药锅锅); pinyin: yào guō guō) etc. .

In terms of the game's script, the production team deliberately used a unit story format in the early part of the story to facilitate the narration of the game's worldview. The production team plans to produce a large number of side stories and personal dungeons after the main storyline of the game becomes stable, in order to complete the character's background story and make the character image more full. As for the plot design of the event, the production team originally planned to make the event plot independent of the main storyline to prevent new players from spoiling the later main storyline content due to the event plot. Later, the event plot was changed to connect the latest main storyline of the current game, and the event levels would be retained in the game. After the game was officially launched, more and more players discussed and studied the game's plot. The production team found that some players had inferred the entire plot of the new event from the information released by the official. The production team said that they would consider adjusting the planned plot based on the community's response. After the game version 2.0, the production team believed that players already had a certain understanding of the game's world view, and the plot design turned to a long-term plot.

In terms of anti-cheating, the production team uses a complete battle recording verification method, which can theoretically restore all of the player's actions 100%. However, since this method stores more data, the game cannot immediately identify the player's cheating behavior. It will only identify whether the player is cheating and implement a ban after completing the verification in the background.

== Release ==
Since the development plan of "Project Neural Cloud" was announced in May 2020, the game was launched on TapTap and pre-ordered. From January 28 to 31, 2021, Girls' Frontline: Neural Cloud participated in the 2021 Taipei International Video Game Show, and the operation team stated that the game is expected to be launched in 2021. On June 11, 2021, the mobile version of Girls' Frontline: Neural Cloud obtained the game version number approved by the National Press and Publication Administration, and the game officially met the requirements for release in mainland China. On September 7, the official announcement was made that the game will be launched on September 23. In the six months before the game's public beta, they officially launched 2,189 sets of advertisements, mainly on the Tencent platform. Before the public beta, the game had received approximately 2 million pre-orders across all platforms. The public beta was launched in mainland China on September 23, topping the iOS free chart and ranking 12th on the best-selling chart in the first week. On the first day, the game was downloaded 240,000 times on the TapTap platform. In October, the game's ranking dropped significantly, falling outside the top 200 on the free chart since October 6. The game's original soundtrack was released on Apple Music at the same time as the public beta, consisting of 22 songs and approximately 55 minutes.

In November 2022, the game launched overseas versions. The international version of the game started pre-registration on September 20 of the same year and was officially launched on November 21. The game's Hong Kong and Taiwan agent distributor is Pei Yu Digital Entertainment. The Hong Kong and Taiwan version started closed beta testing on October 25 of the same year and was officially launched on November 23. The Japanese version was launched on November 24, and the official Pixiv fan creation competition was launched at the same time. The game topped the App Store free list on the first day of its release in South Korea and Taiwan, and the Japanese version topped the App Store and Google Play free list on the first day of its launch. Overseas promotion was carried out in cooperation with Rainbow Club and online anchors, and the international version also invited Owl City to create the English theme song "Up to the Cloud".

== Reception ==
During the testing phase, the game received a score of 9.5 out of 10 on TapTap, but this score dropped to 7 after the game was released. The game's art design is consistent with the style of Girls' Frontline, and the game's UI design is flatter than that of Girls' Frontline. Mobile Games Review commented that it is consistent with the worldview of Project Neural Cloud, which is set in a virtual network system. The game character's modeling in battle is very different from its portrait image. In battle, the character is modeled as a Q-version big-headed dolls, and GamerSky commented that the image "looks cute and funny".
