= Diggles: The Myth of Fenris =

2001 video game

- Developer: SEK GmbH
- Publishers: EU: Innonics; NA: Strategy First
- Platform: Windows
- Release: EU: September 27, 2001; NA: March 19, 2002
- Genre: Real-time strategy
- Mode: Single-player

Diggles: The Myth of Fenris (also known as just Diggles in the North American version, and Wiggles in the European version) is a game released by Innonics in Europe on September 27, 2001, and by Strategy First in North America on March 19, 2002. The game is both a side-scrolling strategy and a colony management sim game which is based on a 3D-engine. You are guiding your dwarves, called "diggles" in the English version, "Wiggles" in the German version and "Gnomy" in the Russian version. The dwarves can manufacture tools, weapons, rooms and other advanced manufacturing shops (as part of a moderately large technology tree). You can set up your workshops and rooms in the caves that your dwarves have been digging. Your mission is to dig down and solve quests which contribute to your global quest, which is to chain Fenris, the fiery dog of Odin. You encounter other clans and creatures on the way, some hostile, some not.

== Gameplay ==
Since your dwarves have a limited lifespan, most of the development is in equipment, while your individual dwarves develop their skills during their lifetime, passing on only a small portion to their offspring. Digging bigger caves also helps you to place the many workshops, rooms and equipment that you will gather.

Your dwarves usually act in automatic planning mode, which means they will figure out themselves how to get stuff done. This means you can both set goals (like "dig here" or "make food") or you can order individual dwarves around. Your dwarves will get upset if they work too long and don't get enough fun out of their free time, so you will have to provide them with sane working hours and entertainment in their free time.

== Development ==
The game was published by Innonics GmbH in 2001, while the software was developed by SEK-ost, Berlin.

- Producer: Marc Möhring
- Development Director: Klaus Starke
- Concept and Planning: Thomas Langhanki, Carolin Batke, Carsten Orthband, Ingo Neumann
- Gameplay Programming Lead: Carsten Orthbandt
- Gameplay Programming: Andrej Treskow, Axel Hylla, David Salz

== Reception ==
Reception

Aggregate score
Aggregator	Score
Metacritic	62/100

Review scores
Publication	Score
AllGame	2/5
Computer Gaming World	1.5/5
GameSpot	6.3/10
GameSpy	68%
GameZone	8.5/10
IGN	7.2/10
PC Gamer (US)	53%
PC Zone	68%

The game received "mixed" reviews according to the review aggregation website Metacritic. Reviewers cited technical/graphic issues, AI/Pathing problems, the user-interface design, slow pace, and excessive micro-management among others.
