= Girls' Frontline =

2016 mobile strategy video game

- Developer: MICA Team
- Publishers: CHN: Darkwinter Software; TWN: Longcheng Tianxia; KOR: X.D. Global; EN: Darkwinter Software; JPN: Sunborn Japan
- Producer: Yuzhong (羽中)
- Composer: Vanguard Sound
- Engine: Unity
- Platforms: Windows, iOS, Android
- Release: Android, iOS: CHN: 20 May 2016; TWN: 18 January 2017; HKG: 30 June 2017; KOR: 30 June 2017; EN: 8 May 2018; JPN: 1 August 2018; Windows: CHN: 20 May 2025; JPN: 26 September 2025; EN: 18 November 2025
- Genre: Strategy role-playing game
- Mode: Single-player

Girls' Frontline

Chinese name
- Traditional Chinese: 少女前線
- Simplified Chinese: 少女前线
Transcriptions
Standard Mandarin
- Hanyu Pinyin: Shàonǚ Qiánxiàn
- Bopomofo: ㄕㄠˋ ㄋㄩˇ ㄑㄧㄢˊ ㄒㄧㄢˋ
- Wade–Giles: Shao^{4}-nü^{3} Ch'ien^{2}-hsien^{4}
Hakka
- Romanization: seu-ńg chhièn-sien
Yue: Cantonese
- Jyutping: siu^{3} neoi^{5} cin^{4} sin^{3}
Southern Min
- Hokkien POJ: siàu-lú chiân-sòaⁿ

Korean name
- Hangul: 소녀전선
- Hanja: 少女前線
Transcriptions
- Revised Romanization: Sonyeo Jeonseon
- McCune–Reischauer: Sonyŏ Chŏnsŏn

Japanese name
- Katakana: ドールズフロントライン
Transcriptions
- Romanization: Dōruzu Furontorain
- Nihon-shiki: Dôruzu Hurontorain

Girls' Frontline (simplified Chinese: 少女前线; traditional Chinese: 少女前線; pinyin: Shàonǚ Qiánxiàn) (Note: Commonly abbreviated as 少前 (Shàoqián) in Chinese, and 소전 (Sojeon) in Korean.) is a mobile strategy role-playing game for Android and iOS developed by Chinese studio MICA Team, where players control echelons of android characters, known in-universe as T-Dolls, each carrying a distinctive real-world firearm. The game was released in Mainland China on 20 May 2016, in Hong Kong and Taiwan on 18 January 2017, and in South Korea on 30 June 2017. The global English version was released on 8 May 2018, while the Japanese version was released on 1 August 2018 under the title Dolls Frontline (ドールズフロントライン) due to the Girls' Frontline trademark in Japan already being held by another registrant. A PC version was released on 20 May 2025 in China, on 26 September 2025 in Japan, and on 18 November 2025 in English-speaking regions globally.

Girls' Frontline is a prequel to MICA Team's 2013 game Codename: Bakery Girl. Two short-length television anime series based on Girls' Frontline have been produced, and an official manga is serialised monthly. Another full-length anime television series by Asahi Production aired from January to March 2022. A sequel, Girls' Frontline 2: Exilium, released in 2023 for the Chinese market, and in 2024 worldwide.

== Gameplay ==
Top: Strategic map interface screenshot Bottom: Combat interface screenshot

The gameplay involves the acquisition of T-Dolls through gacha game mechanics, where the amount of resources spent on construction can affect the T-Dolls acquired. T-Dolls can then be assembled into squads known as echelons and sent into battle to complete combat missions, simulations, or logistics support tasks. The T-Dolls are moe female androids, each representing a personification of real-world small arms. They are categorised into different classes such as handguns, submachine guns, assault rifles, rifles, machine guns and shotguns.

Missions consist of a turn-based strategic battlefield where the player directs echelons across a map consisting of linked nodes with the goal of fulfilling pre-determined mission requirements, such as capturing an enemy command node or rescuing hostage units. Players are able to deploy and move echelons during their turn by expending action points, which depend on the number of heliports and echelons deployed by the player. The enemy units move during enemy turns based on preset instructions. If a player's echelon meets an enemy unit on the same node, a combat sequence is initiated. The combat is largely automated, but players can activate offensive and defensive skills specific to each T-Doll in real-time as well as move individual T-Dolls across a formation consisting of a 3×3 square grid. The position of T-Dolls within the echelon's starting formation provide stat enhancements to other T-Dolls, and the individual stats and abilities of the T-Dolls altogether determine the outcome of the battle against the enemy team. Some missions, known as night-time battles, will handicap the player with a limit to the number of turns possible as well as include a fog of war mechanic restricting visibility over the strategic map. A score-based ranking map is unlocked at the end of every major in-game event, where players can compete for rewards based on their highest score relative to other players during the event.

T-Dolls can also be acquired through random drops after battles in addition to the construction component of the game. T-Doll stats can be complemented by equipment, which are also obtained via a gacha-based construction system or from drops in night battles. Tactical fairies are non-combatant support units that can be added to echelons to provide status buffs to T-Dolls and either have in-battle abilities or skills that can affect the map; in-universe, they are described as AI-equipped tactical drones. In later stages of the game, the player will unlock Heavy Ordnance Corps (HOC) units, which are dedicated fire support units such as mortar teams and anti-tank weapons that can provide supporting fire to echelons in combat. The end-game content also introduces the Protocol Assimilation system, where enemy Sangvis Ferri units can be captured and then sent into battle.

Outside of combat, the player is required to manage their supply of in-game resources, level up facilities within the base to gain economic bonuses or access to different features, and improve the combat stats and abilities of T-Dolls through skill training and other character-raising mechanics. Cosmetic items such as T-Doll costumes and furniture used to decorate the dormitories of T-Dolls are obtained through another separate token-based gacha system. Decorating dormitories also increases a T-Dolls' affection stats through collecting hearts daily. Additionally, some cosmetic items for the commander avatar can also be bought using gems that can be purchased through real-world microtransactions or procured via daily login. When a T-Doll's affection stat reaches 100, the player is able to give them an OATH ring, which may be purchased through gems in the shop. Their affection cap will increase to 150 and they will receive a slight stat boost.

== Synopsis ==
Examples of T-Dolls within the game. Top row: Glock 17, MP7, ST AR-15 Bottom row: WA2000, SPAS-12, Negev

The game is set in a war-torn future where tactical dolls, more commonly known as T-Dolls, are almost exclusively used for combat in place of humans, some having been repurposed from their previous life as civilian androids. The majority of the world is uninhabitable due to contamination from the Collapse Fluid, and much of humankind is dead. In 2062, the artificial intelligence of Sangvis Ferri (SF) spontaneously rebels against humanity, with their T-Dolls and robots killing their human masters and taking over nearby areas. In response, the private military company (PMC) Griffin & Kryuger (G&K) is hired to contain and eliminate Sangvis Ferri forces; the player assumes the role of a recently promoted G&K Commander. The base storyline focuses on the adventures of this commander and the Anti-Rain (AR) Team consisting of M4A1, ST AR-15, M4 SOPMOD II, M16A1, and RO635. Other important characters include the commander's logistics officer, Kalina, AK-12, AN-94, AK-15, RPK-16 and Angelia of Squad DEFY and Squad 404, made up of UMP45, UMP9, 416, and Gr G11.

== Development and release ==
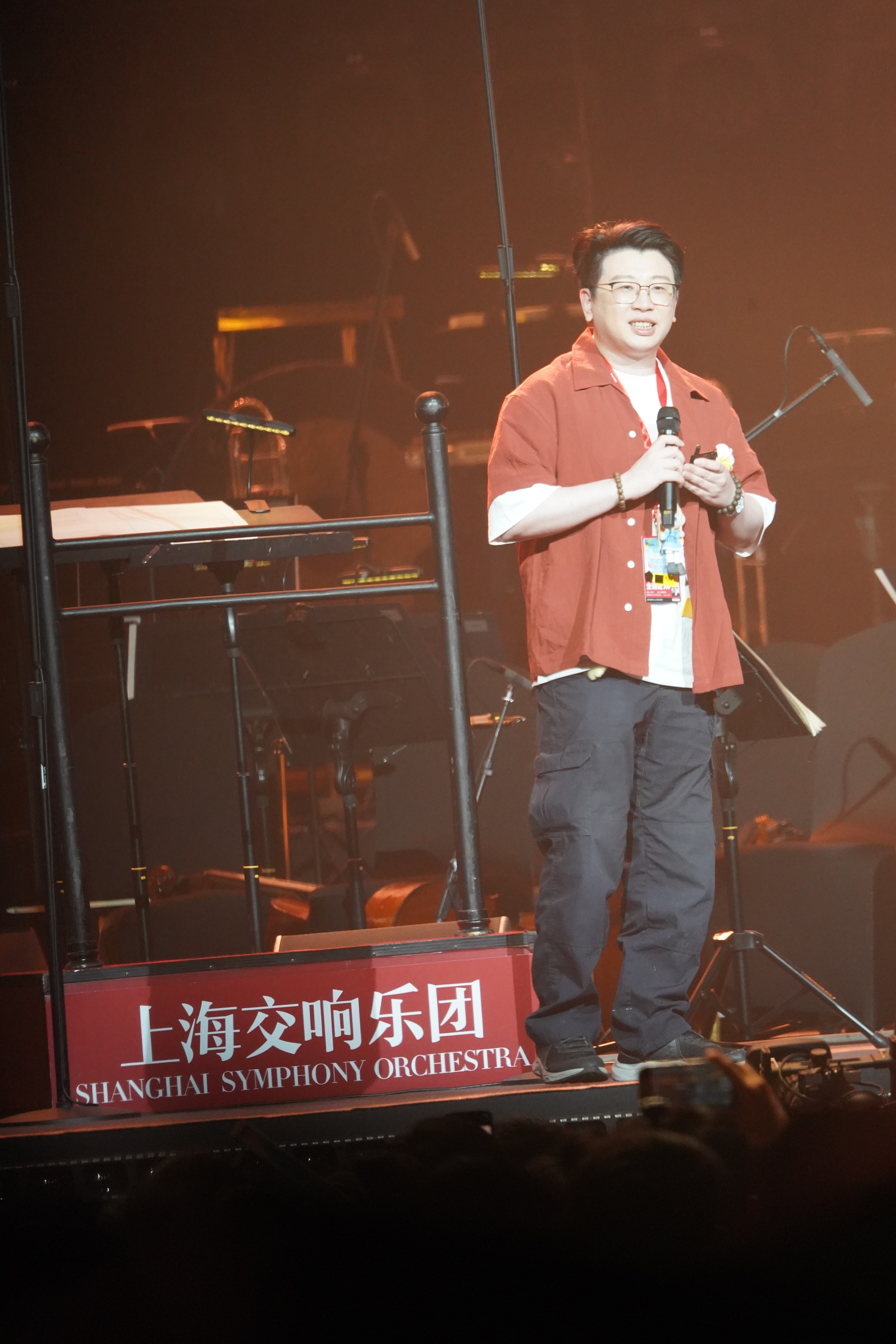
Yuzhong, the CEO of Sunborn and producer of Girls' Frontline

MICA Team originally started as a dōjin club consisting of three people, however during the development of Girls' Frontline, gradually expanded into a company of 117 employees. At the time when Sunborn Network Technology (what would become the parent company of MICA Team) was established, owing to the favourable social environment following Chinese premier Li Keqiang's proposal to support domestic entrepreneurship in 2015, the company secured government support and preferential policies such as tax exemptions. The game's premise was inspired by Kantai Collection, but with anthropomorphized warships replaced with that of firearms, based on the team's anticipations that similar moe anthropomorphism games would become popular in China. The difference from Kantai Collection is that rather than having combat sorties fully automated and only having the player take control over resource management and base raising, Girls' Frontline gives players greater control over the outcome of combat.

During the initial stages of the game's development, game producer Huang Chong (黄翀), more commonly known by the pseudonym Yuzhong (羽中), worked in partnership with his former university-era confidant Yao Meng (姚蒙) who was tasked with operations management while Yuzhong handled development. The game was originally planned to be published under Yao Meng's company, Array Network Technology. However, due to personal conflicts, the two parted ways, and Yao Meng would eventually start a new company, Yostar, which would later publish Azur Lane as its first major game. One major cause of the conflict arose as a result of network issues during the game's testing phase, with both parties insisting that the other side was responsible for resolving the outage; while reflecting on this era of development, Yuzhong later explained in a 2016 interview that his team only had prior experience developing dōjin games, and had limited understanding of online games and backend development. Artist Zhong Qixiang (钟祺翔), more commonly known by the pseudonym Haimao (海猫), served as the game's original art director, but later left MICA Team in 2016 to form his own game development company Hypergryph, which would eventually release Arknights as its first game.

2015 saw a large influx of animesque games in the Chinese videogame industry, with many developers and publishers becoming involved in the genre, leading to a wave of investors hoping to profit from the trend; in October 2015, investment firm Yuanqi Capital (元气资本) reached out to Sunborn and began taking an active role in the development project, hiring senior programmers to assist MICA Team and introducing Yuzhong to Chengdu Digital Sky Technology, a limited partner of the investment firm that aimed to obtain operating rights for the game. In a 2016 interview, Yao Meng explained that he was strongly critical of the collaboration with Yuanqi Capital; meanwhile, Yuzhong claimed that Array Network Technology had attempted to licence the game to Hoolai Games for its Android distribution, an allegation that Yao Meng denies. The two sides would eventually part over disagreement regarding whether to work with Digital Sky, formally terminating their contractual agreement on March 9, 2016. The game was originally planned to be released in Japan under the title Shōjo Zensen (少女前線) in Q3 2016; however, due to the disputes over distribution rights, wasn't able to release there until 2018 under the new name Dolls Frontline (ドールズフロントライン). (Note: Commonly abbreviated as Dorufuro (ドルフロ).)

On March 21, 2018, following the official announcement of K7 as a new playable T-Doll for the game, South Korean players accused the character's illustrator of being a radical feminist, due to her earlier tweets discussing the novel Kim Ji-young, Born 1982. After Sunborn initially responded with a statement explaining that "there has been no evidence that any K7 illustrator belongs to a certain extreme feminist organisation", South Korean players responded negatively to the announcement, and K7's character was subsequently removed from the game by the developers.

In an August 2020 interview, Yuzhong remarked that during the 2014–2015 era of games, many players felt spending 10 to 20 minutes on daily tasks was a chore. Thus, he aims to make game time more fragmented when designing his own games. In the same interview, he also notes that each successful Chinese animesque game developer creates their own specialisation (for instance, MiHoYo focusing on action games while Papergames focuses on games directed at female audiences), and that this "niche partitioning" minimises the effect of larger game companies muscling out smaller studios that have firmly-established niches, with Sunborn's specialisation focusing on animesque strategy games.

The Chinese server shut down on December 31, 2024, due to contractual disputes with the operator Chengdu Digital Sky Technology. The other servers remain unaffected. In January 2025, MICA Team announced a new PC version of Girls' Frontline, which released on Steam on 20 May 2025, and allowed players on the Chinese server to transfer game progress from the mobile version to the Steam version. On September 4, 2025, a Steam release for the Japanese version of the game was announced, which later released on September 26, 2025.

== Collaboration events ==
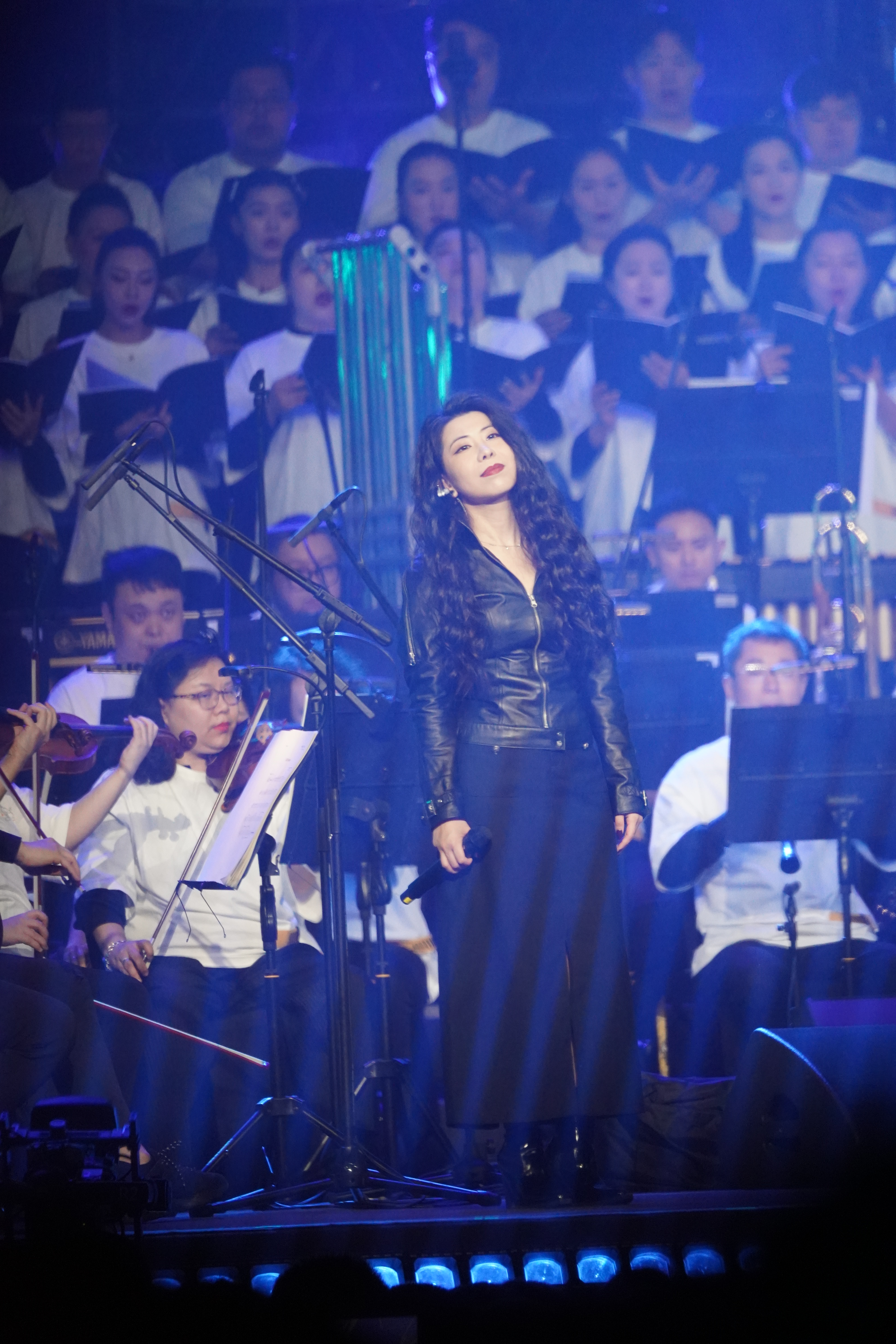
Kinoko performing "What Am I Fighting For" alongside the Shanghai Symphony Orchestra and Shanghai Opera House Choir at the Girls' Frontline 10th Anniversary Music Carnival in May 2026

The game has had several collaboration events with other game companies. On 4 September 2018, the PlayStation 4 rhythm game DJMax Respect introduced three songs from Girls' Frontline as DLC, while time-limited DJMax Respect mission events were added to the global release of Girls' Frontline in May 2020.

A collaboration event for Guns Girl Z took place in November 2017 for the Chinese release of Girls' Frontline, and featured characters from that game as guest T-Dolls. On November 20, 2018, Girls' Frontline featured a crossover event with Arc System Works where Noel Vermillion and Elphelt Valentine from BlazBlue and Guilty Gear respectively would appear in the game as recruitable allies. In 2019, the game featured a collaboration event with VA-11 Hall-A, which included the addition of mission events and VA-11 HALL-A characters as obtainable T-Dolls. In 2020, a collaboration event with the Gunslinger Girl franchise took place where 5 of the cyborgs were obtainable T-Dolls with added mission events and puzzles themed after the franchise.

In January 2020, Girls' Frontline collaborated with Ubisoft's Tom Clancy's The Division where the T-Dolls of Griffin PMC join an online tournament of the Division game. The event also introduced two new characters to recruit; Agent 416 and Agent Vector, who are alternative universe versions of the characters HK416 and Vector that joined the Division. In February 2023, a Zombie Land Saga collaboration featured seven characters from the anime as recruitable units. A collaboration event with the anime Dropkick on My Devil! began on November 16, 2021, featuring the main character Jashin-chan and four other characters as recuitable characters. In May 2024, a collaboration with Ghost in the Shell: SAC_2045 featured Motoko Kusanagi and two other characters as recruitable units. In November 2024, a collaboration event for Arena Breakout was held on the Chinese server, with the event releasing on other servers the following year. In July 2025, the season 7 event of Call of Duty: Mobile implemented crossover content featuring Girls' Frontline cosmetics.

On November 16, 2025, the Shanghai Symphony Orchestra made their first collaboration with Sunborn for the "Girls' Frontline 10th Anniversary" concert, performing a live orchestral arrangement of the Girls' Frontline soundtrack composed by Vanguard Sound at the Jaguar Shanghai Symphony Hall, conducted by resident conductor Sun Yifan, with vocals by Kinoko (Note: Stage name of Huang Yuxin, lead singer of Vanguard Sound) and the Echo Festival Choir. A second collaboration with the Shanghai Symphony Orchestra took place on May 2, 2026, for the "Girls' Frontline 10th Anniversary Music Carnival" held at the National Exhibition and Convention Center in Shanghai.

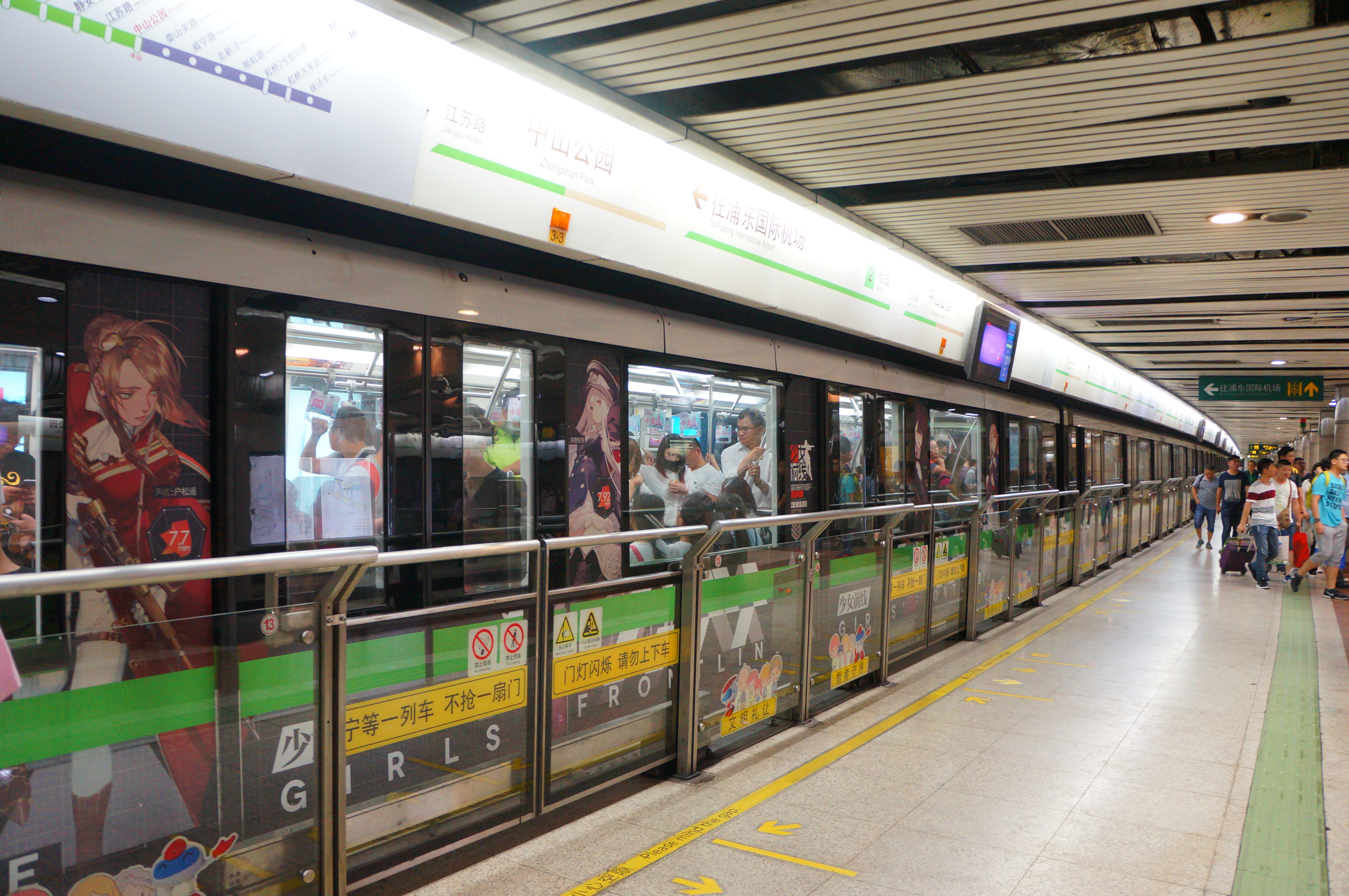
Promotional campaign featuring "Grifon Express" train stopped at Zhongshan Park station

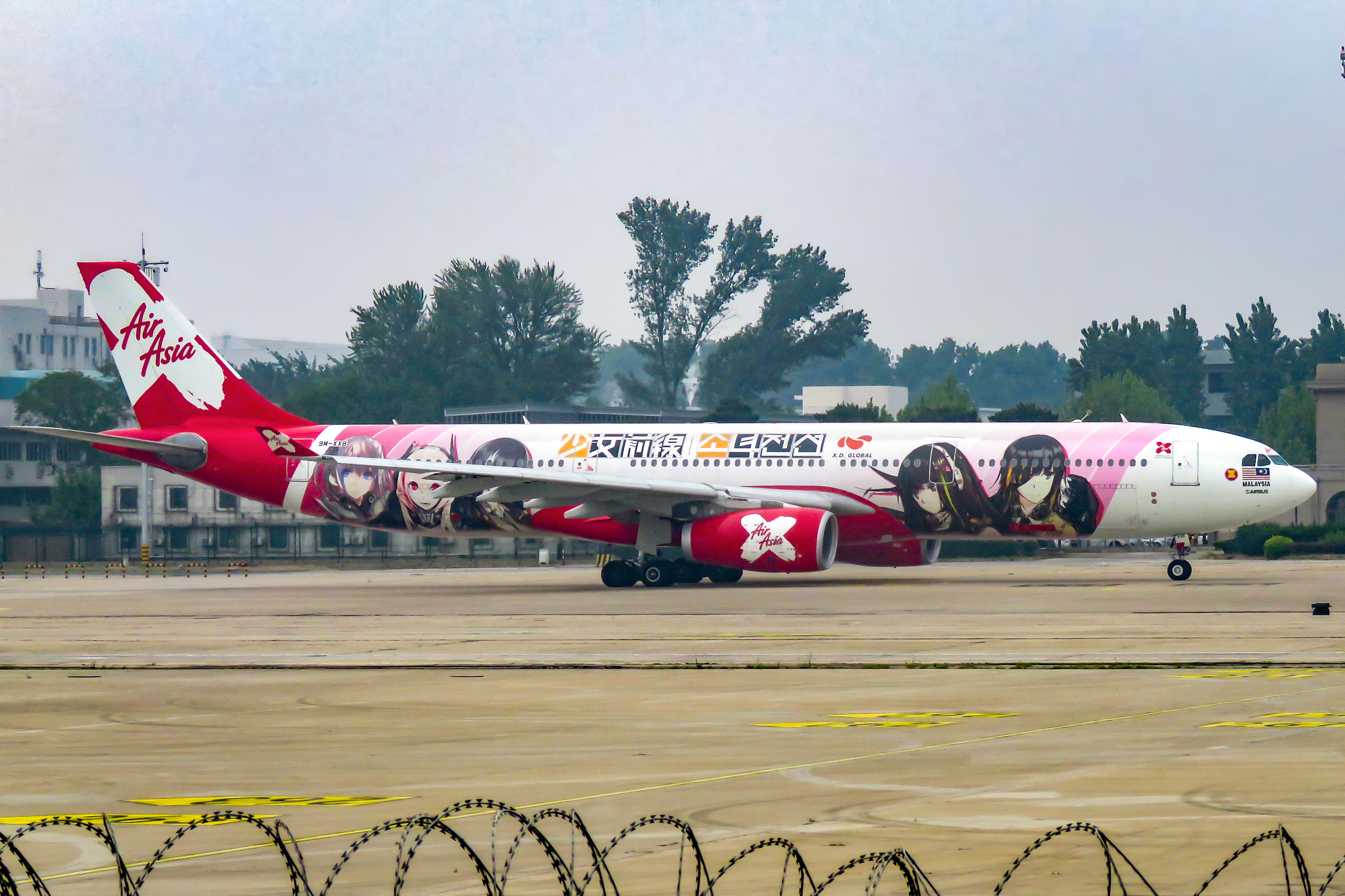
AirAsia X Airbus A330 in Girls' Frontline livery

== Media ==
- Girls' Frontline

ドールズフロントライン (Dōruzu Furontorain)
- Manga

Girls' Frontline: The Song of Dolls
- Illustrated by: Ling
- Published by: Ichijinsha
- Magazine: Monthly Comic Rex
- Original run: July 26, 2019 – present
- Volumes: 7
- Anime television series

Girls' Frontline: Healing Chapter
- Directed by: Lu Hongxi
- Studio: Taika Tori Animation
- Original network: Tokyo MX, BS11
- Original run: October 5, 2019 – December 21, 2019
- Episodes: 12
- Anime television series

Girls' Frontline: Madness Chapter
- Directed by: Lu Hongxi
- Studio: Taika Tori Animation
- Original network: Tokyo MX, BS11
- Original run: December 28, 2019 – March 14, 2020
- Episodes: 12
- Anime television series
- Directed by: Shigeru Ueda
- Produced by: Yuki Maeda; Daerang Choi
- Written by: Hideyuki Kurata
- Music by: Takashi Watanabe
- Studio: Asahi Production
- Licensed by: Crunchyroll: SEA: Muse Communication
- Original network: Tokyo MX, BS11, AT-X
- Original run: January 8, 2022 – March 26, 2022
- Episodes: 12

=== Anime ===
A chibi-style television anime series featuring 12 short episodes titled Girls' Frontline: Healing Chapter (どるふろ -癒し編-, DoruFuro: Iyashi-hen) aired on Tokyo MX and BS11 from October 5 to December 21, 2019. A second series of animated shorts titled Girls' Frontline: Madness Chapter (どるふろ -狂乱篇-, DoruFuro: Kyōran-hen) streamed on Bilibili and aired on Tokyo MX and BS11 from December 28, 2019, to March 14, 2020. The Bilibili releases of both series are voiced in Mandarin Chinese, while the Japanese broadcast versions are voiced in Japanese.

On January 22, 2021, an anime television series adaptation produced by Warner Bros. Japan and animated by Asahi Production was announced. The series is directed by Shigeru Ueda, with Hideyuki Kurata handling series composition, Masaki Yamada designing characters, and Takashi Watanabe composing the music. It aired from January 8 to March 26, 2022, on Tokyo MX, BS11, and AT-X. (Note: Tokyo MX lists the series premiere at 25:00 on January 7, 2022, which is effectively 1:00 a.m. JST on January 8.) The opening theme song is "BAD CANDY" by yukaDD, while the ending theme song is "HORIZON" by Team Shachi. Funimation licensed the series outside of Asia. Muse Communication licensed the series in South and Southeast Asia. The English dub streamed on Funimation's website on February 4, 2022.

==== Characters ====
Main characters appearing in the 2022 Girls' Frontline anime.

Griffin & Kryuger (G&K)
Character	Voice actor (JP)	Voice actor (EN)	Description
Berezovich Kryuger	Akio Ōtsuka	Chris Rager	Head of the Griffin & Kryuger private military company
Helianthus (Helian)	Rui Kariya	Anastasia Munoz	High-ranking officer at Griffin & Kryuger who reports to Berezovich Kryuger
Persica	Karin Nanami	Marissa Lenti	Scientist from 16LAB which provides technology to Griffin. She created the T-Dolls in the AR Team and is involved in their ongoing development.
Gentiane	Mikako Komatsu	Arryn Zech	New commander brought in to command the AR team who is concerned about the lives of the T-Dolls.
Shi Jun	Yuuki Sanpei	Chris Guerrero	Commander of Base 601 with adjutant Super-Sass.
Kamolov	Mitsuaki Hoshino	Bryan Massey	Commander of Base 737 with adjutant PK.
Franklin	Junichi Yanagita	Uncredited	Griffin commander whose strength is in engineering rather than combat.
M4A1 (M4)	Haruka Tomatsu	Amber Lee Connors	Elite T-Doll from 16LAB and leader of the Anti-Rain (AR) team consisting of herself, ST AR-15, M4 SOPMOD II, M16A1, and RO635.
ST AR-15 (AR15)	Emiri Katō	Alexis Tipton	Elite T-Doll and member of the AR team.
M4 SOPMOD II (SOPII)	Yukari Tamura	Dani Chambers	Elite T-Doll and member of the AR team.
M16A1 (M16)	Nozomi Yamane	Michelle Rojas	Elite T-Doll and member of the AR team, M4's older sister.
FNC	Sumire Yatsurugi	Amanda Lee	Basic T-Dolls who are former civilian models with less advanced weapons, but are enhanced with Fire Control Cores and Imprint System to enhance their strength.
MP5	Naomi Mukaiyama	Sarah Wiedenheft	Basic T-Dolls who are former civilian models with less advanced weapons, but are enhanced with Fire Control Cores and Imprint System to enhance their strength.
MG3	Risa Taneda	Brianna Roberts	Basic T-Dolls who are former civilian models with less advanced weapons, but are enhanced with Fire Control Cores and Imprint System to enhance their strength.
Scorpion	Eriko Matsui	Kristen McGuire	Basic T-Dolls who are former civilian models with less advanced weapons, but are enhanced with Fire Control Cores and Imprint System to enhance their strength.
PPSh-41	Sumire Uesaka	Natalie Rose	Basic T-Dolls who are former civilian models with less advanced weapons, but are enhanced with Fire Control Cores and Imprint System to enhance their strength.
Sangvis Ferri (SF)
Character	Voice actor (JP)	Voice actor (EN)	Description
Agent	Hitomi Nabatame	Katelyn Barr	Acts as the Grand Overseer of Sangvis Ferri and is a Rear Command type android
Executioner	Shizuka Itō	Elizabeth Maxwell	High level T-Doll and ringleader who prefers to fight in close quarters, sometimes switching to her sword to deal massive damage.
Scarecrow	Kaya Okuno	Cristina Vee	High level T-Doll and ringleader adept at the collection and analysis of information.
Hunter	Ami Hagihara	Dawn M. Bennett	Model SP-721 high level T-Doll and ringleader who prides herself on her hunting skills to outwit the enemy.
Intruder	Yuka Ōtsubo	Morgan Lauré	Model SP-914 high level T-Doll and ringleader who carries a large caliber machine gun and is skilled in commanding combat dolls.
Destroyer	Yūki Takada	Macy Anne Johnson	Model SP5NANO high level combat support T-Doll and ringleader with long range artillery capability.
Dreamer	Kaya Okuno	Corey Pettit	Model SPACA high level T-Doll and ringleader, whose main expertise is in defense.

==== Episodes ====
No.	Title	Directed by	Written by	Storyboarded by	Original release date
1	"THE SEED"; Transliteration: "Tane" (Japanese: タネ)	Masato Suzuki	Hideyuki Kurata	Masato Suzuki	January 8, 2022
In 2062, M4A1 leads the Anti-Rain (AR) Team of Griffin & Kryuger PMC elite T-Dolls, consisting of M16A1, ST-AR-15 and M4 SOPMOD II, on a mission to collect secret data left by the deceased scientist Lyco in an area controlled by the rogue AI forces of Sangvis Ferri (SF). They access Lyco's old computer with the remote assistance of T-Doll scientist Persica, but learn that the SF Forces, led by a Ringleader named Agent, also after the data. The AR Team enlists the aid of an abandoned nearby Griffin Echelon force composed of G43, Scorpion and PPSh-41 T-Dolls to fight the SF forces while M4 downloads the data. M4 asks the Echelon force to hold off SF reinforcements while the AR Team heads to the SF command post they suspect is located in a church, but later discover that it is a trap set up by Agent. Agent's clone Dummies decimates the Griffin Echelon while Agent herself and another of her Dummies attacks AR Team. The team realizes their electronic communication has been hacked so they use old non-verbal tactics to confuse Agent, enabling SOPII to launch a grenade and eliminate her. M4 reluctantly agrees to have the team split up and head in different directions to confuse the SF Forces while returning to Griffin with the Lyco data. She promises to find a Griffin Commander that they can trust. Meanwhile, a new human officer name Gentiane arrives at a Griffin base.
2	"WAKE UP"; Transliteration: "Mezame" (Japanese: 目覚め)	Mizuki Sasaki	Hideyuki Kurata	Tomomi Mochizuki	January 15, 2022
Gentiane is appointed as a Commander at the Griffin Forward base and is immediately informed by the base's logistics officer, Kalina, that her first mission is to intercept a SF scouting party in a nearby town. Gentiane interviews the T-Dolls under her command to determine their strengths and weaknesses before formulating a plan to effectively defeat the enemy with minimum casualties. Following a successful mission, Gentiane's superior officer, Helian, admits the mission was a test as she is looking for a new generation of officers who can adapt to today's warfare where robots fight in humanity's stead. By treating the T-Dolls like humans, Gentiane gains the admiration and respect of the T-Dolls under her command. Later, during a routine patrol, an Echelon force discovers an injured Ingram, who reveals her team mate Scorpion was captured by a SF Ringleader named Scarecrow seeking information on M4's last known location. Gentiane sends a team to rescue Scorpion and capture Scarecrow and they succeed despite the latter being a high level Sangvis T-Doll. However, Scarecrow boasts that she was able to calculate M4's location from Scorpion's coded communication and has sent the coordinates to her comrade, Executioner, before she self-destructs. Meanwhile, M4 continues to evade her pursuers.
3	"THE ECHO"; Transliteration: "Ekō" (Japanese: エコー)	Takahiro Ōtsuka	Hideyuki Kurata	Masato Suzuki	January 22, 2022
M4 contacts Persica who informs her that a recovery mission is under way. Meanwhile, Helian reports to Berezovich Kryuger, head of Griffin & Kryuger, who suspects that Scarecrow was able to get classified information because of a mole within G&K. Elsewhere MP5 assures Gentiane that if T-Dolls are killed, they can be revived from archived mind uploads. Gentiane is introduced to Persica, who gives her M4's last known location, although FN-49 and FNC made efforts to investigate the area, they still cannot find her. Gentiane then reviews training footage of the AR Team and realizes that because M4 values the lives of T-Dolls under her command, she didn't reveal herself to the recovery team deliberately to avoid them becoming involved with SF Forces. Executioner and her Vespid forces eventually locates M4 at an abandoned farm, although M4 has set booby traps, Executioner soon has her cornered. However, Executioner and her troops are attacked from behind by MP5 and MG3 who had worked out M4's strategy after finding a hidden clue at M4's previous location. After Executioner mocks her AR Teammates, M4 angrily shoots her head to pieces before returning to the G&K base with her rescuers.
4	"SILENCE01"; Transliteration: "Chinmoku Zero Ichi" (Japanese: 沈黙01)	Takashi Kikugawa	Hideyuki Kurata	Hiroshi Aoyama	January 29, 2022
While recovering in the repair room, M4 secretly calls for her teammates to which M16 responds and later AR-15 who is with SOPII. MP5 and the rest of the T-Dolls of the base takes M4 to meet Commander Gentiane who agrees to M4's request to rescue her AR teammates. She then sends three Echelon forces including with M4 to a city where AR-15 was last located but is occupied by SF forces. To minimize casualties among the more vulnerable Griffin T-Dolls, Gentiane commands one team to lure SF forces to a kill zone before the others surround them. M4 is reunited with SOPII who informs her that their communications with M4 led them to be discovered by SF so AR-15 acted as a decoy to help SOPII escape. Meanwhile, SF Forces attack Griffin's Forward base with Vespid forces and M4, SOPII and Echelon forces are recalled to help them. M4 realizes that under the new commander, the dolls are fighting together as comrades rather than individual units. M4 and SOPII to fight together with their new friends and eventually defeat SF but Gentiane resists sending another rescue mission to find AR-15. Meanwhile, the Sangvis ringleader Hunter has taken AR-15 prisoner, planning to use her as bait to capture M4.
5	"SILENCE02"; Transliteration: "Chinmoku Zero Ni" (Japanese: 沈黙02)	Masahiro Takata	Hideyuki Kurata	Yūki Mochimaru	February 5, 2022
Much to M4 and SOPII's joy, Helian authorizes Gentiane to form a rescue mission for AR-15. In the briefing room, M4 and SOPII are reunited with Scorpion and PPSh-41, who were rescued by Gentiane. Gentiane explains to her T-Dolls that AR-15 is held at an SF supply base and this will be a recon mission only, with the assistance of teams from two other Griffin Commanders, Shi Jun of Base 601 and Kamolov of Base 737. The Griffin forces discover that the SF base is heavily defended and Hunter contacts M4, offering to release AR-15 in exchange for her surrender. However, one of the base's supply trains crashes and the SF Vespid forces suddenly turn on each other. M4 and the Griffin forces take advantage of this sudden development to deactivate the base's defenses and gain entry. Hunter regains control of some of her troops but finds AR-15 has escaped. While tracking her, Hunter is caught in a blast and trapped under rubble by explosives set up by AR-15. AR-15 tells Hunter that she actually allowed herself to be captured, so that while Hunter was distracted she seized the opening and hacked into the base's command module to make the SF fight each other. AR-15 executes Hunter and then reunites with her teammates, reminding them they still need to rescue M16. Meanwhile, Helian assigns Gentiane a new mission with a special team of T-Dolls.
6	"THE MESSAGE01"; Transliteration: "Messēji Zero Ichi" (Japanese: メッセージ01)	Naoki Matsuura	Hideyuki Kurata	Shigeru Ueda	February 12, 2022
A few days earlier, Griffin dispatched a Spec-Ops team to an area of Sangvis activity on the S09 Mountaintop City Region but come under heavy fire. Gentiane is requested to send in a team led by M4 to act as a diversion. During a break in the fighting, M4, AR-15, Scorpion and PPSh-41 find the remains of G43 at the site where they were attacked months ago by Agent. M4 wants to take G43 back, but Scorpion assures her that her mind will be restored into a new body from a backup. Base 601 recovers a recording between Agent and the other Sangvis ringleaders about Plan Parapluie, (Note: "Parapluie" is the French word for umbrella.) the "Relics" and mentions increasing Sangvis forces in the city. Commander Shi Jun sends it to Gentiane who confirms increased Sangvis presence from a satellite feed. Helian confirms this is the work of a new Sangvis ringleader called Intruder who specializes in commanding troops. After contacting M4 to let her know that she is safe, M16 is attacked by HK416, a former comrade who was assigned to the Spec-Op team, Squad 404, but now wants to kill M16 for an undisclosed reason. M16 defeats HK416, but spares her, then HK416's leader, UMP45, comes out of hiding to retrieve her. UMP45 gives M16 a coded phrase about "rain" that Persica might understand before leaving M16 on her own mission with a secret weapon strapped to her back.
7	"THE MESSAGE02"; Transliteration: "Messēji Zero Ni" (Japanese: メッセージ02)	Shigeru Ueda	Hideyuki Kurata	Masato Suzuki	February 19, 2022
M4's team take over a poorly defended Sangvis supply base, but Intruder gloats over an open communications channel that they have fallen into her trap while she coordinates an intense Sangvis attack on the two other Griffin teams. Thanks to Squad 404's help, Helian manages to get Intruder's location and Gentiane instructs M4's team to Intruder's location. M4, AR-15, PPsh-41 and Scorpion track Intruder to a concert hall to find her waiting for them. She opens fire on them from a barrage of automated machine guns, trapping the Griffin Dolls in a withering crossfire. However, AR-15 finds a blind spot enabling the team to shoot their way clear. Meanwhile the other teams take care of Sangvis reinforcements thanks to PPK, who helps them overcome their weakness in night battles. In desperation, Intruder opens fire with her massive large caliber machine gun. However, she is taken down by M16 who arrives and reveals she was the one who created the blind spot for M4's team. Before dying, Intruder warns M4 and the others that the story is far from over.
8	"THE KINDLING01"; Transliteration: "Hidane Zero Ichi" (Japanese: 火種01)	Takahiro Ōtsuka; Takashi Kikugawa	Hideyuki Kurata	Osamu Yamasaki	February 26, 2022
As the reunited AR Team continue their mission, Gentiane wonders who commanded the team during their top-secret mission at Safehouse 3 and why their identity was erased from the team's memories. Later, Gentiane and her T-Doll adjutant G36 attend a conference at a secret underground Griffin base. She meets Shi Jun and Kamolov along with their adjutants, Super-Sass and PKK, as well two other commanders, Kawasaki and Franklin. Helian informs the commanders that Kryuger will explain Sangvis's Parapluie plan, however, the base is suddenly hit by heavy artillery fire and comes under attack by a large Sangvis force. Gentiane is injured but joins her fellow commanders and the base's T-Dolls fighting against the Sangvis. Gentiane convinces Kryuger that the AR team has the capability of operating independently and reassigns them to destroy the Sangvis command node and disrupt their attack. MKV and Vector join the AR team, and with AR-15's recon skills they locate the Sangvis base and gain entry through a poorly guarded passage. Inside, the AR team finds the base empty, but are presented with a video message from the Sangvis Ringleader, Destroyer, who has just escaped.
9	"THE KINDLING02"; Transliteration: "Hidane Zero Ni" (Japanese: 火種02)	Mizuki Sasaki	Hideyuki Kurata	Akira Oguro	March 5, 2022
Destroyer mocks the AR teams efforts and ends her transmission. AR-15 suggests they regroup rather than pursue her, so the team returns to the secret Griffin base where Kryuger and Helian arrest AR-15. They have discovered that she leaked the base's location to Sangvis and AR-15 agrees to be interrogated. Following analysis, Helian informs Gentiane that after her capture by Sangvis, AR-15 was infected with a virus that transmitted data to them, so Griffin has shut down her Zener Protocol. (Note: External electronic communications) Later, Gentiane suggests the base be used as a "Luxemburg", (Note: "A Luxemburg" refers to a buffer state standing between an advancing threat and the home country. cf. The Evening Post Vol.XCVII N. 39, February 17, 1919, p6, THE CHANNEL AND THE RHINE.) while she and the other Commanders send their T-Dolls on another mission to find Destroyer, after first ordering backups of their minds. The Griffin field teams are notified that AR-15 has escaped before another ringleader, Dreamer, creates a communications blackout enabling Destroyer to escape from hiding. With encouragement from a revived G43, the AR team abandon their current mission and decided to find their missing teammate. Meanwhile, Destroyer calls on Dreamer for help, reminding Dreamer that she planted the virus in AR-15 during the Safehouse 3 mission. However, Dreamer explains that Destroyer has no further use and will be wiped out along with the Griffin teams, revealing that this isn't the first time Dreamer sacrificed her and erased her memories before reconstructing her.
10	"THE KINDLING03"; Transliteration: "Hidane Zero San" (Japanese: 火種03)	Masahiro Okamura	Hideyuki Kurata	Kazutaka Muraki; Naoki Matsuura	March 12, 2022
Dreamer assures Destroyer she will not abandon her as she is still useful, and fires the giant railgun Jupiter Cannons at the AR Team who are approaching Destroyer's position. Kryuger senses a trap set for the AR Team and orders them to retreat while sending other T-Dolls teams into the area to attack, resulting in many being destroyed by the cannons. Meanwhile, AR-15, who has been secretly tracking Destroyer, is detected by Dreamer but swears revenge for exploiting her via the Parapluie virus. A week later, while the destroyed T-Dolls' Neural Clouds being uploaded into their new bodies, Gentiane recalls being informed that the Elite T-Dolls, like the AR Team, are important to the company because of their capacity for emotion and individual thoughts and their Neural Clouds cannot be backed up. Hence, if an Elite Doll gets destroyed, they die for good. Later, while on a mission in Griffin territory, the AR Team apprehend a group of armed humans in armored suits. They are revealed to be Kryuger and his mercenaries scavenging battlefield remnants of Sangvis technology. Kryuger and Helian conclude that parts of the armored T-Doll Aegis and the tactical mechanized infantry Nemeum indicate that Sangvis is evolving by producing advanced T-Dolls along with the Parapluie virus to destroy Griffin. They decide that they must find AR-15 before Sangvis does and analyze the virus.
11	"COMET01"; Transliteration: "Suisei Zero Ichi" (Japanese: 彗星01)	Masato Suzuki	Hideyuki Kurata	Masato Suzuki	March 19, 2022
The AR Team continues their search for AR-15 with the help of Squad Negev, composed of Negev, Galil, Micro Uzi and TAR-21. However, the Squad is soon attacked by a Sangvis force led by the ringleader Alchemist who tries to infect them with the Parapluie virus. They retreat to a nearby planetarium and Galil warns the AR Team that their communications have been jammed. M16 heads back to call for reinforcements while M4 and SOPII follow Galil to rescue her teammates. M16 and the Griffin reinforcements combined with Squad Negev, M4, SOPII and Galil finish off the enemy but Alchemist escapes. As Galil heads into the planetarium to find her teammates, AR-15 suddenly appears before M4 and SOPII. Later, M16 finds SOPII unconscious and alone, with M4 and AR-15 gone. Gentiane calls off the search for AR-15 and orders all Griffin forces to retreat when a large Sangvis force suddenly appears. A flashback shows when AR-15 and M4 first meet and how AR-15 resents that she was created to be M4's friend and obey her commands.
12	"COMET02"; Transliteration: "Suisei Zero Ni" (Japanese: 彗星02)	Shigeru Ueda	Hideyuki Kurata	Shigeru Ueda	March 26, 2022
M4 appears to be interrogated by AR-15, but it is really Mastermind, leader of Sangvis Ferri seeking information about M4 herself through M4's neural cloud. AR-15 leaves M4 and goes after Alchemist who has been ordered to eliminate AR-15 with the Griffin forces and to find M4. As AR-15 fights Alchemist, Squad Negev is lured into a Sangvis trap in a nearby town, however, the other Griffin Commanders arrive to help them evacuate. SOPII ambushes and shoots Alchemist, saving AR-15 who gives SOPII a hard drive of Sangvis data, a recorded message by AR-15 herself and M4's actual location. AR-15 reveals to M16 that since she is an ongoing threat to her teammates because of the Parapluie virus, she plans to sacrifice herself to eliminate Mastermind. As AR-15 confronts Mastermind in the building she has booby-trapped with explosives, her message to the AR-Team is played, saying that despite initially disliking her teammates because of their individual quirks, she grew to like and care about them and says goodbye to her friends. The Sangvis troops open fire on AR-15 but she manages to detonate the explosives, destroying not only herself but seemingly Mastermind and her troops with her. As the AR team mourns the loss of AR-15, Kryuger interviews a new Elite T-Doll. Meanwhile, Mastermind is revealed to have survived the explosion, and is informed by Agent that another T-Doll has been infected with the Parapluie virus.

=== Manga ===
Beginning in July 2019, an official manga series titled Girls' Frontline: The Song of Dolls (ドールズフロントライン 人形之歌) and illustrated by Miharu has been published online monthly in Chinese by Bilibili, and serialized in Japanese within the Monthly Comic Rex. There are also four official manga anthology volumes published by Dengeki Bunko titled Dolls Frontline Dengeki Comic Anthology (ドールズフロントライン 電撃コミックアンソロジー) consisting of one-shots by various manga artists, and another manga anthology by Ichijinsha with four volumes titled Dolls Frontline Comic Anthology (ドールズフロントライン コミックアンソロジー) with its own separate collection of one-shot manga releases.

=== Audio CDs ===
The theme song of the game, "Frontline!", is performed in Korean with vocals by Guriri and composition by M2U; the full track is included within the soundtrack CD bundled alongside the official artbook titled The Art Of Girls' Frontline Vol.1. A second theme performed in English titled "What Am I Fighting For" features vocals by Akino and is included within a 31-track original game soundtrack released on July 24, 2019. The game's soundtrack also features guest tracks composed by Basiscape. English and Japanese versions of "Frontline!" were later included in the second original soundtrack released on June 17, 2020; the limited edition release of this soundtrack also included a Blu-Ray for the Girls' Frontline Orchestra: Dolls with Lycoris radiata (Chinese: 人形与彼岸花) concert events which took place in Shanghai and Tokyo.

A character song collection entitled "ECHOES" was released on August 26, 2020.

== Reception ==
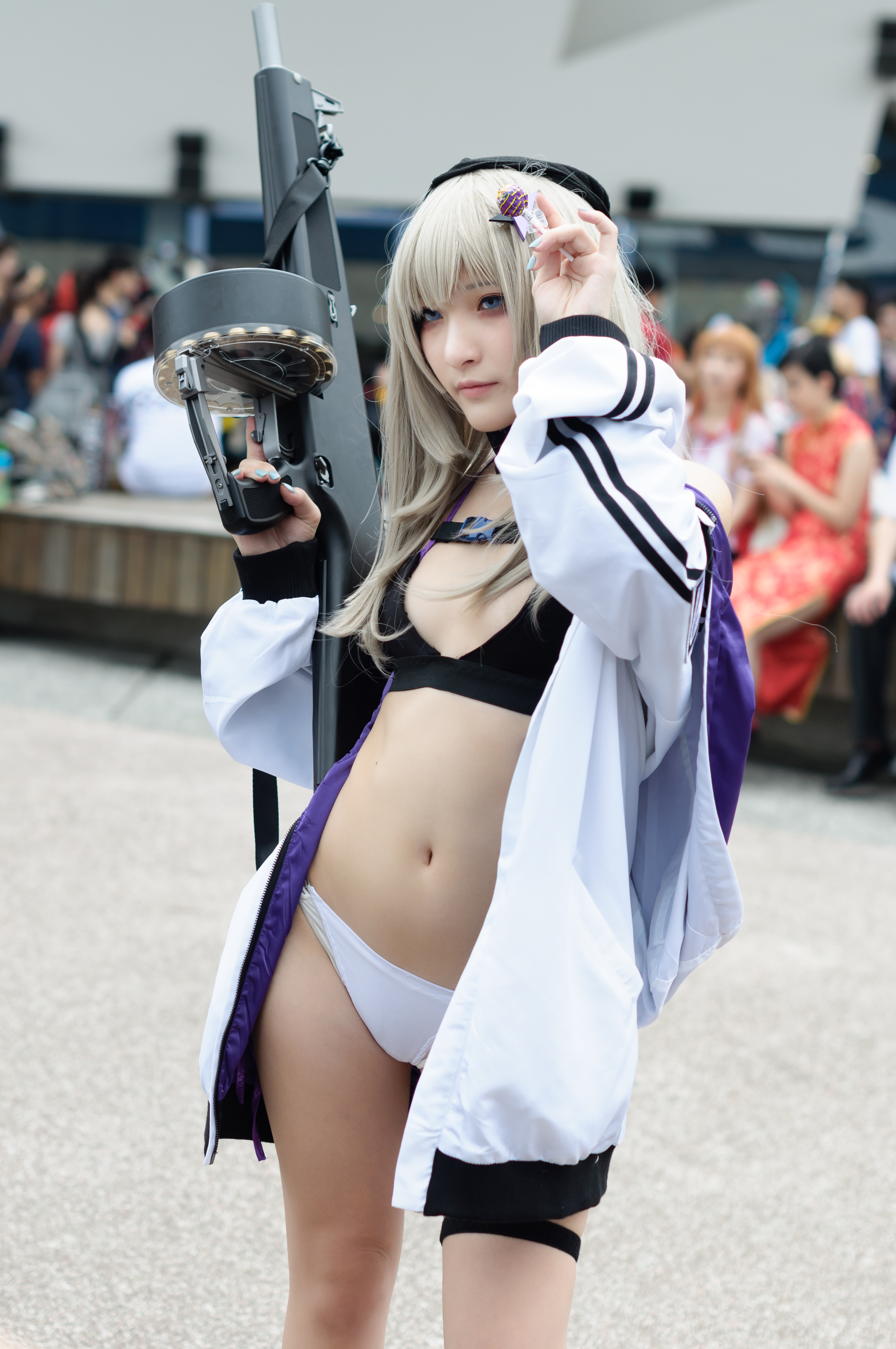
Cosplay of AA-12 at the 30th Asian Animation Creation Exhibition

Girls' Frontline was the 3rd top-grossing game by revenue on Google Play and the 5th top-grossing game on the Apple App Store for the South Korean region in 2017. The perception that the game doesn't force players to use pay-to-win microtransactions compared to other mobile games, along with its encouragement of player interaction during automatic battles, are often-cited reasons for the game's popularity in South Korea, where it is the first Chinese-developed game to be able to compete with domestically created rivals. According to the "2025 China videogame industry trends and future potential analysis report" released by Chinese analytics firm CNG, the game franchise has over 30 million players worldwide.

Prior to 2010, games targeting "otaku" players in South Korea were largely absent; while the introduction of Kantai Collection in Japan during 2013 significantly influenced the trajectory of otaku-focused games there, Kantai Collection had very little impact in South Korea, presumably due to it not having an official release in the country, likely out of concern of the potential for controversy over the game's theme of World War II Imperial Japanese Navy warships. South Korean games media ThisIsGame argues that it was Girls' Frontline which filled the void left by Kantai Collection's absence in South Korea, and that gameplay designs originally introduced by Kantai Collection such as its monetization system and character construction mechanic were well received by Korean players of Girls' Frontline.

Hong Kong Inmedia describes Girls' Frontline as more like a novel that the player needs to clear missions for in order to continue reading, rather than a mobile game, noting that the ultimate focus of the game revolves around the narrative involving the game's characters, and that the storyline serves as the game's most defining strength.

In a 2020 interview between game producer Yuzhong and Youxi Ribao, it was revealed that towards the later years of the game, revenue between the domestic Chinese server and the global servers eventually reached a 1:1 ratio, and Yuzhong attributes this overseas success to a strong gun culture in the United States, in addition to the existence of compulsory national service in South Korea.

== Spin-off games and sequels ==
The tactical role-playing game Reverse Collapse: Code Name Bakery (Chinese: 逆向坍塌：面包房行动) developed by MICA Team and published by X.D. Network was released for Nintendo Switch, Microsoft Windows, and smartphone platforms. Set 30 years after in the same universe as Girls' Frontline, it is a remake of the original dōjin game Code Name: Bakery Girl, featuring new art, character voices, story, and game mechanics.

In May 2020, a sequel titled Girls' Frontline 2: Exilium (Chinese: 少女前线2：追放) was announced for release on smartphone platforms, alongside two spin-off games titled Girls' Frontline: Glitch Land (Chinese: 少女前线：谲境) and Girls' Frontline: Neural Cloud (Chinese: 少女前线：云图计划). Exilium stills follow the core design of turn-based tactical combat, however introduces 3D modelling for the characters. Under producer Yuzhong's direction, the games feature different aesthetic styles, with Exilium and Glitch Land featuring a more realistic, cinematic style, Code Name Bakery having a more grave and stern aesthetic, and Neural Cloud with a more exaggeratedly cuter design. Neural Cloud was released in China in September 2021, and worldwide in November 2022, while Exilium released in China in December 2023, and worldwide in December 2024. The development of Glitch Land was placed on indefinite hiatus, after the game's producer left Sunborn.

On September 4, 2025, a mobile PvP third-person shooter spin-off game titled Girls' Frontline: Fire Control (formerly known under the development title "Project NET") was officially announced. The game was developed by Hecate Team, a subsidiary studio of Sunborn. It was made in the Unity3D engine. The game was launched in select regions starting from October 23, 2025. (Note: Soft-launched in Thailand on October 23, 2025, launched in the rest of Southeast Asia (excluding Vietnam) on November 27, 2025.) According to Sunborn, this game was intended to reach emerging markets such as Southeast Asia, the Middle East and CIS, which the company has yet to properly establish a foothold in prior to this game. Despite these initial plans to expand to other regions, Hecate Team announced that the game will terminate its live service on August 26, 2026. Later at an anniversary concert event on May 2, 2026, Yuzhong announced another project by Hecate Team titled Girls' Frontline: SEED (Chinese: 少女前线：蓝蝶契约; lit. 'Girls' Frontline: Blue Butterfly Contract'), a PvE-focused cooperative third-person shooter which features team compositions involving distinct player classes, and is developed based on player feedback from Girls' Frontline: Fire Control. The game is scheduled for a 2026 release.

Fingertip Breakthrough (Chinese: 指尖突围) is a standalone singleplayer survivors-like spin-off game based on the Girls' Frontline universe, announced in November 2025 for release on iOS and Android.
