= Alien Shooter =

2003 video game

- Developer: Sigma Team
- Publisher: Sigma Team
- Composers: Alexander Shushkov; Denis Kolobayev
- Platforms: Microsoft Windows, Android, iOS, PlayStation Vita, PlayStation 3, PlayStation 4
- Release: May 18, 2003
- Genre: Top-down shooter

Alien Shooter (Russian: Alien Shooter: Начало Вторжения) is an isometric, top-down shooter video game developed and released by Sigma Team, a Russian game development studio. Released on May 18, 2003, it was initially available on Microsoft Windows. The game's conclusion was realized in two expansion packs, both consisting of five-levels and released in 2004: Fight for Life, released on June 14, and The Experiment, released on September 22.

The sequel, Alien Shooter: Vengeance, was released in 2006. In June 2015, Sigma Team and co-developer 8floor released a PlayStation Vita port of the game.

On January 22, 2020, Sigma Team released Alien Shooter 2: The Legend, a reboot of the previous sequels with updated graphics, gameplay, and new content.

== Gameplay ==
Alien Shooter is presented in a top-down, third-person view (3/4 perspective), and takes place across nine levels of increasing difficulty. The main objective of each level is to eliminate all the aliens. To do so, players must access all of the areas that the level has to offer (by completing tasks such as reactivating power generators, destroying walls, and disabling force fields, etc.) and removing the alien threats within. Later levels feature teleportation devices, which spawn enemies indefinitely, and can only be destroyed by special explosives scattered throughout the level.

Characters have four stats: Strength, Accuracy, Health, and Speed, and players have the option to play as either a male or a female character. Male characters have higher strength, and higher health stats, whereas female characters have improved accuracy and higher speed.

Once exterminated, alien enemies drop loot consisting of money, health, ammo, and other items. Between levels, players can purchase upgraded, more powerful weapons in the shop, along with permanent stat upgrades. Temporary upgrades can also be purchased, including "Lives", Body Armor, Attack Drone, etc. Most items in the shop can also be found scattered throughout the levels.

== Plot ==
In the early year 2030, scientists from M.A.G.M.A Energy Corporation created the bio-engineering creatures by mixing both animal DNA and alien cells from a meteorite they had found. Those creatures have been successfully created, such as mutant frogs/spawn frogs, multi-armed bipeds/raptors, giant spiders, and tank rhinos. However, something bad happens, the aliens plan to escape from their cage while using a teleporter device as their escape plan. The Protagonist's task is to eliminate the aliens inside the abandoned experiment labs. As the protagonist explores the lab, the root of the problem is revealed to be a malfunction with an experimental teleportation device. Somehow, the aliens have managed to flood through en masse, killing the scientists and guards who were working in the lab. Delving deeper into the complex, the protagonist encounters ever more powerful aliens and realizes that all the teleporters must be destroyed. The game reaches its conclusion when the protagonist has eliminated all of the aliens and destroyed all the teleporters in the laboratory.

The final cut scene shows a single female spawn frog escaping the laboratory and running away. The story is continued in the first expansion, Fight For Life, and concluded in the second expansion, The Experiment.

- Fight for Life: Six months after the events of Alien Shooter, it becomes clear that the alien creatures have returned. The protagonist must revisit the laboratory and is tasked with the mission of recovering and deploying a virus to kill all the invaders. After reaching the depths of the laboratory, the protagonist locates the virus but discovers that the aliens have already destroyed it. Nevertheless, the second assault on the laboratory forces the alien hordes to retreat.
- The Experiment: A few days after Fight for Life, scientists from M.A.G.M.A. plan to bio-engineer two brand new separate species of "mutant dinosaurs" and "acid bats" aliens to aid them and kill their previous creations. They succeed in creating the creatures, but the creatures go berserk and kill the scientists. The protagonist returns once again to eliminate the aliens for good. Alongside M.A.G.M.A. soldiers, the protagonist ultimately rescues the surviving scientists and recovers a sample of the creatures' DNA.

== Reception ==
In 2012, GameSpot gave Alien Shooter a 6.4 out of 10 rating, writing, "While the game makes good on its promise of giving you aliens to shoot, the result is very repetitive."

== Related games ==
- Alien Shooter: Vengeance
- Theseus – Return of the Hero— Released in 2005, it offers new locations, six types of weapons, 10 missions, two modes, and additional purchasable gear.
- Alien Shooter - The Beginning— A mobile version of the original PC game that has been ported to iOS. It offers new visual effects and elements.
- Alien Shooter Revisited— A remaster of the original Alien Shooter released on April 15, 2009. It features ten missions; 9 weapon types; three game modes; modern visual effects; and upgrading via the use of implants. In addition, additional gear can be purchased that carries over to the next level. Compared to the original, there's visually less blood.
- Alien Shooter 2: Reloaded—Released on March 14, 2009, it offers two new missions as well as an individual shooting mode called Gun Stand. A mobile version was released in April 2020.
- Alien Shooter 2: Conscription—Released July 3, 2010, it is an add-on to the Alien Shooter 2 Series.
- Zombie Shooter—Alien Shooter is similar to this top-down shooter that was released on December 29, 2007. It featured ten missions, nine types of weapons, and experience points that can be earned to provide extra skill points. In addition, there are three game modes, and extra equipment that can be bought. It follows a similar premise as Alien Shooter; the human race is in grave danger. Scientists went too far and were unable to contain the threat. After becoming infected with their mutated contagion, they became zombies. Now, crowds of undead fill a secret research base and the dreadful virus is on the verge of spreading across the world.
- Alien Shooter 2: The Legend - reboot version of Alien Shooter 2: Conscription and Vengeance/Reloaded, released on 26 July 2018 for mobile and 22 January 2020 for PC. The Legend featured updated graphics, new content, and additional gameplay features, including multiple endings and an online tournament mode.
- Alien Shooter 2: New Era - direct sequel of Alien Shooter 2: The Legend.
- Alien Shooter: TD - tower defense game based on the series, released for multiple platforms in 2017.
