= The I of the Dragon =

2004 role-playing strategy video game

- Developer: Primal Software
- Publishers: RUS: Akella; EU: Deep Silver; NA: Strategy First
- Platforms: Microsoft Windows, OS X, Linux
- Release: Windows: RUS: December 2002; EU: March 10, 2004; NA: November 1, 2004; OS X September 7, 2015; Linux; March 11, 2017
- Genres: Role-playing video game, Strategy
- Mode: Single-player

The I of the Dragon (Russian: Глаз дракона) is a role-playing video game developed by Russian studio Primal Software where the player assumes the control of a dragon.

The game was re-released on GOG.com in July 2020.

The Game is available on Steam Platform.

== Plot ==
The game takes place in an ancient land. There, both humans and dragons had lived paying no attention to each other until one dragon after studying the human race believed they could be valuable allies to help rid the land of evil. They fought side by side for many battles until finally Skarrbor was defeated. Peace was brought into the world and the dragons taught the humans the secret of magic, but soon a powerful sect called the Zealots grew within the human race that believed the dragons would seek to gain the throne that Skarrbor once held. And so they began to destroy all the dragon eggs they could find. Eventually the dragons decided to leave and avoid another bloody war while one dragon remained behind to hide a dragon egg in the ruins of a temple. That dragon then made a prophecy to a last faithful priest, before he flew away, that the evil Skarrbor would return in the 6th age to once again wreak havoc upon the lands. The 6th age came but the signs were ignored and before long Skarrbor's evil minions once again roamed the land destroying towns and killing all. Although the prophecy foretold doom, it also foretold of a savior. A strong and powerful beast. The Dragon.

== Gameplay ==
=== Playable dragons ===
Annoth - Annoth is one of the dragons destined to save the world from evil and is colored red with a mix of other colors in the game. Annoth is a powerful and strong dragon who can breathe fire, and is the dragon able to achieve the missile type attack fastest. Because of its strong power, Annoth does not favor using magic.

Barroth - The second of the dragons destined to save the world from evil and is colored blue mixed with red in the game. Barroth is a fast and magic using dragon who can breathe cold air, causing the enemies to freeze. Barroth is the only dragon who is able to use many spells and regenerate mana in a short amount of time. Since Barroth only uses magic, it is a more advanced dragon to use.

Morrogh - Morrogh is the final dragon destined to save the world from evil and is colored black mixed with some brown in the game. Morrogh is a fast regenerating and dark magic using dragon who can release toxic air into the ground, which is used to poison and kill enemies. Morrogh is the only dragon who is compatible with all skills (except for speed). Since Morrogh is fast on regenerating its health back and can use some basic spells, Morrogh is slow with ability advancement.

=== Game features ===
- Build Towns - The I of the Dragon features the ability to build towns. After defeating each major enemy in each sector, there is the option to build a town. Towns are randomly constructed cities with an altar in the middle.
- Upgrade Towns - The upgrade town feature in the game is only available once you are in possession of the artifact found in one of the Trixter lairs. It can only be used when a town exists, has enough energy to be upgraded and has not reached its maximum level. Further levels of towns increase its defensive potential, creates larger walls, more soldiers, etc.
- Spells - Each dragon in the game can use spells, some more efficient than others. These spells range from summoning deadly beasts to raising large mountains and volcanoes.
- Orbs - Orbs are magical spheres which glow red, green or blue. Each provides a different character-development effect. For example, green spheres provide more spell slots. Orbs are gathered by destroying lairs (monster spawn bases).

== Reception ==
Reception

Aggregate score
Aggregator	Score
Metacritic	55/100

Review scores
Publication	Score
4Players	81%
Computer Games Magazine	2/5
GameSpot	6/10
GameSpy	2.5/5
IGN	4.5/10
PC Gamer (US)	31%
PC Games (DE)	65%
X-Play	2/5

The PC version received mixed reviews according to the review aggregation website Metacritic. GameSpot said, "The I of the Dragon doesn't make much use of its interesting premise. In this game, being a dragon turns out to be a pretty prosaic job. The game does offer some mildly interesting tactical options, thanks in part to the wide spell selection, but those strengths nearly collapse under the weight of the pitifully bland campaign. The I of the Dragon has some short-term appeal, but over time it makes you feel like a glorified exterminator, tediously eliminating an endless stream of generic monsters for no real reason." IGN said, "All of this is really a shame, because The I of the Dragon had some neat ideas that could have made for one great game. I mean, who wouldn't want to play as a dragon raining fire down on hordes of hopeless creatures while they cringe in fear of your greatness? Unfortunately the poor implementation just makes for one sloppy experience that's not even worth playing when there are so many great titles out this time of year. Don't waste your time."

== See also ==
- DragonStrike - another dragon-sim
- Magic Carpet - game with similar gameplay
- Drakan: Order of the Flame
