= Solid Ice =

1996 video game

- Developer: Strategy First
- Publisher: Empire Interactive
- Platform: MS-DOS
- Release: October 1996
- Genre: Hockey

Solid Ice is a 1996 video game developed by Strategy First and published by Empire Interactive.

== Gameplay ==
Solid Ice is an ice hockey simulation featuring all the National Hockey League Players' Association players. The lower part of the gameplay screen has a scoreboard which displays the score, game clock, up to four penalties per team, and a Profiler which shows the strengths of the skater the player selects. The game features an editor to alter or create new leagues, teams, players, logos, and uniforms. The game uses a side perspective, similar to watching sports on television.

== Development ==
The game was announced in June 1996. The company spent about $750,000 on the game, including a "substantial" amount paid to the National Hockey League Players' Association to use player names and statistics.

== Reception ==
Reception

Review scores
| Publication | Score |
|---|---|
| Computer Gaming World | 3/5 |
| Computer Games Strategy Plus | 3.5/5 |
| GameSpot | 4/10 |
| PC Games | D+ |
| PC Gamer | 30% |

GameSpot rated the game a 4 of 10 stating "If you're looking for a good, solid hockey simulation, pass on this one - it certainly isn't enough to hold a true fan's interest for long".

Gorden Goble from Computer Gaming World reviewed the game stating "A fascinating but flawed look at PC hockey, SOLID ICE should be noted for the things it does right. Hearty recommendations, however, will have to wait until next time.

Strategy First expected to sell 20,000 copies of the game.
