= War Times =

Military strategy video game

- Developer(s): Legend Studios
- Platform(s): Windows
- Release: 2004
- Genre(s): Real-time strategy

War Times is a real-time strategy computer game for Windows released in 2004. It was developed and produced by Spanish company Legend Studios and distributed in USA and Canada by Strategy First. It is a World War II strategy game where the player can play as either the Allies or the Axis and usually has to complete a task that pertains to killing the opposing force or defending a base from enemies for a set amount of time.

== Story ==
Two campaigns are available: The first campaign concerns the Allies, with the player playing as Britain, the United States, or the Soviet Union. The second campaign is the Axis, with the player playing as Nazi Germany. In the Allied Campaign, the player can play in all the theaters except the Asia-Pacific theater All of the important battles such as the Battle of Berlin, Operation Market Garden, and D-Day can be played. The German Campaign you play the important battles as Operation Sea Lion and Operation Barbarossa.

== Gameplay ==
Each Nation has their own unique kind of units. The Germans have the flamethrower, dirigible, sidecar, panzer IV, tiger I, jagdpanzer. Britain has the matilda, mortar soldier, and spy. The Soviet Union has the Amphibious Elite, T-34, and the SU-76. The United States has the Elite soldier, Super bomber, and the Sherman
