= New World Order (video game) =

2002 video game

- Developer: Termite Games
- Publishers: EU: Project Three Interactive; NA: Strategy First
- Platform: Microsoft Windows
- Release: EU: December 5, 2002; NA: March 25, 2003
- Genre: First-person shooter
- Modes: Single player, multiplayer

New World Order is a 2002 online team-based tactical first-person shooter video game, similar to Counter-Strike. The game was developed by Swedish studio Termite Games.

== Reception ==
Reception

Aggregate score
Aggregator	Score
Metacritic	32/100

Review scores
Publication	Score
Computer Gaming World	1/5
Eurogamer	1/10
GameSpot	2.1/10
GameZone	6.5/10
IGN	4.2/10
PC Gamer (UK)	55%
PC Gamer (US)	53%
PC Zone	69%
X-Play	1/5

The game received "generally unfavorable reviews" according to the review aggregation website Metacritic. GameSpot stated that it "fails in every imaginable way", and Eurogamer described it as "horrendously bad" and "a total farce".
