= Call for Heroes: Pompolic Wars =

2007 video game

- PAL cover art for the cancelled Wii version
- Developer: Quotix Software
- Publisher: Strategy First
- Platform: Windows
- Release: NA: June 26, 2007
- Genre: Action role-playing
- Mode: Single-player

Call for Heroes: Pompolic Wars is a 2007 action RPG video game originally developed for Windows by Serbian studio Quotix Software, and published by Strategy First. The game was supposed to be published for Wii by the now-defunct Data Design Interactive but was ultimately cancelled.

== Reception ==
The PC version of the game was panned, IGN gave the game the rare score of 1.2/10, and GameSpot gave the game a 2/10. The game was criticized for poor design and glitches, subpar gameplay and lackluster dialogue and storyline; it also sold poorly.
