= Clans (video game) =

1999 role-playing video game

- Developer: ComputerHouse GBG AB
- Publishers: Strategy First, Inc.
- Platform: Microsoft Windows
- Release: July 15, 1999; Steam: 2014
- Genres: Action role-playing, dungeon crawl, hack and slash
- Mode: Single player

Clans is a 1999 action role-playing game developed by ComputerHouse GBG AB. The game includes some elements from point-and-click adventure games. The game was re-released on Steam in 2014.

== Plot ==
The world of Clans is populated by four different clans, that of humans, barbarians, elves, and dwarfs. Once, they were put in a state of war by an evil demon, who was, however, later imprisoned, thus stopping the massacre. Now, the demon woke up again in his prison, which is now populated by his minions. Player, taking the role of one of the best warriors of the four clans, has to enter the demon's domain, making his way to the demon himself. The game concludes with the player killing the demon.

== Gameplay ==
The game is similar in both basic gameplay and visuals to Diablo series. However, there is no leveling system, meaning that the only way to increase player's attributes is by collecting rings, drinking special stat-raising potions, and simply using more powerful weapons and better armour. Four classes are available to play: warrior, barbarian, dwarf, and elf, all with the same abilities, but each especially good at one. Clans is split into seven stages, with the seventh being mostly the boss stage. Each stage is divided into many sectors, or "rooms", that player visits. During the game, the player is often tasked with solving a riddle or puzzle, or helping a friendly character. Also present are point-and-click graphic games elements, such as inventory, an ability to use items with objects or characters. While there is no town in-game, the player encounters several quest-giving or simply aiding characters (like wizard, old woman, blacksmith, chef, witch, cursed warrior) and a trader along the way. Some of the main characters' quotes are presented in a humorous style. The player can find and equip 5 attribute-boosting rings, and use swords, axes, shields, and armor of five types each (though there are only four axes). The main point of gameplay is navigate through the stage, finding better equipment and health potions in order to cure the wounds received from monsters, which ranges from the weak goblin-like humanoids and trolls to the most dangerous black mages and knights.

== Reception ==
Reception

Review scores
Publication	Score
GameZone	4.7/10
IGN	5.3/10

GameZone gave the game a 4.7 of 10 stating "A stock storyline and old-style gameplay cannot stand up to this year's better releases" IGN gave this game a mediocre rating of 5.3/10 points. It said it was pleasant, but too plain and not challenging, especially in the RPG part.
