= Ironclads: American Civil War =

2008 video game

- Developer: Totem Games
- Publishers: Totem Games; Strategy First
- Designer: Maxim Ferapontov
- Engine: Oleg Ferapontov
- Platform: Microsoft Windows
- Release: October, 2008 (online)
- Genre: 3D naval historical turned-based strategy
- Mode: Single-player

Ironclads: American Civil War (Russian: Броненосцы: Эпоха стальных гигантов) is a 3D naval historical turned-based strategy game based on the American Civil War.

The player operates a squadron of warships of the United States Navy or the Confederate States Navy: broadside ironclads, ironclad rams, ironclad turret ships, monitors, sloops-of-war, gunboats and screw commerce raiders. The player is tasked with destroying the opponent's ships, coastal batteries and warehouses.

A lot of attention went into the details, historical accuracy and convenience of the interface. 3D models of the ships are based on archival drawings. A key feature of the game is realistic ship to ship combat, simulating the characteristics of each ship, including: damage, flooding, fires, destruction, armor values and guns.
