= Culpa Innata =

2007 video game

- Cover art
- Developer: Momentum AS
- Publisher: Strategy First
- Platform: Windows
- Release: October 19, 2007
- Genre: Adventure
- Mode: Single player

Culpa Innata (Latin: Original Sin or Innate Fault) is a third person point-and-click adventure game developed by Turkish company Momentum AS and published by Strategy First. The game invites the player into an exploration of a Utopian city of Adrianopolis through the eyes of Wallis, an officer who is investigating the murder of a citizen in a neighboring "Rogue State" in Odessa.

== Gameplay ==
Gameplay screenshot

The game is set in a fully 3D rendered environment, where the player controls Wallis, with a point-and-click interaction system. The game is non-linear in that it allows complete freedom of movement and exploration both in terms of the game itself and the narrative; a player's actions will dynamically affect the ending, giving the game an RPG element. In addition, the game reacts dynamically to the player's actions; the sequence that locations and events are unlocked is based on those actions and can vary depending on the order in which they were unlocked. Culpa Innata features an in-game diary to track a player's progress. The game also features a proprietary logic engine that allows 10,000 condition links between the events in Culpa Innata, creating a different experience for every player. The game also features a day/night cycle; certain events and characters appear only during a specific time of day.

== Premise ==
Culpa Innata takes place in the year 2047 in the city of Adrianopolis. The city is part of a capitalist world government called the World Union, composed of most of the major First World countries, where disease and felonies have been nearly eliminated. World Union's value system is similar to the society established in Aldous Huxley's Brave New World, creating a level of societal expectation based on numerical indices pre-defined in the system that only take into account how much a person accumulates. The society is also extremely hedonistic, marriage (or "nuptial contracts" as they are called by the World Union) is obsolete, and relationships are based on sexual interest, with multiple liaisons commonplace. Elements of Objectivism are included alongside the concept of selfish attitudes, with citizens receiving a numerical score of skillfulness called an HDI (Human Development Index).

The story is centered on protagonist World Union Peace Officer Phoenix Wallis, who is investigating the murder of a fellow World Union citizen in a neighboring "Rogue State" in Odessa. The game features multiple endings, based on the choices and actions of the player.

== Development and release ==
The idea of the game was, according to the developer, inspired by Alev Alatlı's novel duology Schrödinger's Cat. The developer, Burak Barmanbek, published a novel in 2012 which also carries the title Culpa Innata.

== Reception ==
On Metacritic, the game has an average rating of 66 out of 100, based on 13 critics, indicating "mixed or average reviews".

Just Adventure gave the game its highest possible score, A+. IGN, on the other hand, gave the game a score of 4.0 out of 10 ("Poor").

== Sequel ==
A sequel, titled Culpa Innata 2: Chaos Rising, was announced in August 2008. Citing financial difficulties, the developer announced in early 2013 that the sequel will be released as a book instead.
