= Zero-G Marines =

- Developer: Strategy First
- Programmer: Xavier Javornicki
- Platform: Windows
- Release: Cancelled
- Genre: Shooter

Zero-G Marines is a cancelled video game that was in development by Strategy First. It was influenced by games such as Unreal Tournament and Quake 3. The plot involves space stations being taken over across the solar system.

== Gameplay ==
In Zero-G Marines, the player takes command of a Marine officer to fight infected zealots on the mining stations of Mars and the moons of Jupiter. The player must command their squad using a tactical interface while also controlling the Marine officer during 3D first-person shooting gameplay.

== Development ==
Zero-G Marines was in development by Strategy First, a company based in Ottawa, Ontario, Canada. Development on Zero-G Marines began in 1998. Around ten people were working on it. Zero-G Marines was showcased at E3 2000.

Zero-G Marines was slated for a 2002 release. It was officially cancelled in May 2002, due to some changes in the development studios at Strategy First.
