= Space Empires =

- Genre: Turn-based strategy
- Developer: Malfador Machinations
- Platforms: MS-DOS, Windows
- First release: Space Empires; 1993
- Latest release: Space Empires V 2006

Space Empires is a series of 4X turn-based strategy video games by Malfador Machinations for MS-DOS and Windows. The player assumes the role of the leader of a space-faring civilization.

== Gameplay ==
In Space Empires, the player assumes the role of the single leader of a race of intelligent beings that has recently acquired the technology required to build large fully space-based ships for interplanetary and interstellar travel.

Starting out with only a few possible hull sizes for their ships, on which they can place any number of components to essentially create a unique ship, the player can research new hull sizes and components to use with them, eventually being able to build ships ten times the size of his original hull size.

The components available to the player can vary greatly, from ship bridges, long-range scanners and shield generators to emergency supply components that, when used, will be destroyed but will allow a ship to continue moving for a longer time, and of course, weapons of various kinds, boarding parties, cloaking devices right up to Dyson sphere construction material and star-destroying devices.

The player can meet extraterrestrial races (which will inevitably happen as the player expands their realm) and conduct diplomacy with them. Treaties can be signed between two empires, varying from the basic trade agreement to full-blown partnerships and even protectorates. The player can also conduct intelligence operations, from simple information gathering missions, to ship bombs, to inciting rebellion on a planet.

Interstellar travel in Space Empires is not faster-than-light drive based, but instead relies on anomalies called "warp points", essentially wormholes between two star systems. Warp points are naturally occurring but a player can open and close these warp points if she or he has the appropriate technologies.

== Games ==
- Space Empires (unreleased)
- Space Empires II (1995)
- Space Empires III (1997)
- Space Empires IV (2000)
- Space Empires: Starfury (2003)
- Space Empires V (2006)

== Release and development ==
Space Empires II and Space Empires III were released as shareware. Space Empires III was later released as freeware. MikroBitti called Space Empires III one of the best shareware space strategy games, rivaling the quality of commercial products.

In 2006, Strategy First acquired Malfador Machinations and the Space Empires intellectual property prior to publishing Space Empires V. Strategy First still owns the Space Empires intellectual property and has not developed another PC game.
