= O.R.B: Off-World Resource Base =

2002 video game

O.R.B.: Off-World Resource Base
- Developer: Strategy First
- Publishers: NA: Strategy First; EU: Mindscape
- Platform: Windows
- Release: NA: November 8, 2002; PAL: March 14, 2003
- Genres: Space simulation, Strategy game
- Modes: Single-player, multiplayer

O.R.B: Off-World Resource Base (or simply O·R·B) is a space strategy game developed and published by Strategy First. Much like Homeworld and its sequel Homeworld 2, units can move in all three spatial dimensions.

== Story ==
The story of O·R·B begins with two ancient races, the Aldar and a race created by the Aldar, the Elathen, engaged in a battle for survival. The Aldar lost this conflict and their civilization was completely wiped out. However, the Aldar left behind two younger races, the Malus and the Alyssians, each guided by a document called the Torumin. This document takes on religious importance to both races, but the true purpose of it is lost to both.

The campaign story begins chronologically with the Malus, who begin a campaign to exterminate the Alyssians, whom they believe to be the "Great Betrayers" their holy documents speak of. The Alyssians use the same symbol as the Elathen to represent themselves, hence the confusion. The Malus drive the Alyssians from their homeworld, realizing after the fact that a Torumin identical to the one that guides them is also in the hands of the Alyssians.

The Alyssian campaign sees the homeless Alyssians finding a new settlement, only to be harassed by the Kyulek, servants of the Elathen. Aided by the Seekers of Ftorrek, an outcast Malus clan, the Alyssians rediscover the technology of their ancestors in order to stop the returning threat of the Elathen.

== Gameplay ==
As with most strategy games, the object of O·R·B is to defeat the enemy forces by gathering resources to build an attack fleet. As the name of the game implies, this is done by locating resource-bearing asteroids which must be mined to finance construction of new units. Successfully locating and protecting these asteroids is a key point in the game, as resources are scarce and the player must compete with their enemy to tap them.

To gain new technologies and better ships, the player must research them. This is particularly important in the campaign mode, as research is accumulated over each mission: a player who neglects research in favor of force in the early levels will find themselves severely outmatched in the later levels. In contrast, unlike Homeworld, a player's fleet is usually not cumulative, and thus after finishing a specific level the player will be dependent on local sources to rebuild a new (and usually better) fleet.

Further emphasizing a focus on careful resource management, the player has a limited crew with which to research new technologies and crew constructed vessels. In addition, the number of crew allocated to a certain task will determine the amount of time needed to complete the task; for example, five researchers will work faster than one, and having double the number of crew required for a ship will build it much faster than the bare minimum. The crew limit is determined by the number of bases the player has, as well as their type, and the training level the player has put research into.

The game has two main playable races: the Alyssians and the Malus. Aside from a few unique ships on either side, the differences between the two are mostly cosmetic. The game also has three sub-races: the Aldar, the Elathen, and the Kyulek. These races aren't playable, but the Aldar ships can be used at some points. Compared to the main races, the technology of these two is much more diverse: Aldar ships rely heavily on laser technology, Elathen ships use electricity-based weapons (they are also significantly stronger than the other races), and Kyulek ships emit energy pulses from their hulls.

O·R·B has a fairly small number of ships, many of which are simply enhanced versions of a specific class (e.g. Defender and Missile Defender). Depending on the type, ships will require a specific number of crew to be built. The four main classes of ships are fighters, logistics (such as repair ships or radar-jamming vessels), mining ships, and capital ships. Each costs more crew and resources than the last to build.

In combat, fighters are designed to be cheap and fast, such that the player can lose several without significant impact. While inferior to the larger capital ships, a squadron of missile-armed bombers can successfully destroy a capital ship at a smaller resource cost to the player; however, these same bombers can easily fall prey to other fighters. Capital ships require much more resources and when lost can be almost irreplaceable, but offer a much bigger tactical advantage. Armed with beam weapons, they can engage both fighters and other capital ships with ease. They also allow the player to set up a dominant force away from their spaceport.

The environments themselves are also mobile. On a given map, a resource asteroid in the player's territory is liable to drift into enemy territory if given enough time, and likewise enemy bases can do the same. Some maps also feature natural hazards, such as fast-moving comets which can obliterate entire carriers in a single pass.

== Development ==
According to game designer Phil O'Connor, O·R·B was designed to take a different approach on the RTS genre, emphasizing the "strategy" therein.

The storyline also received significant attention, as the developers wanted to move away from the rehashed alien stories in other space simulation games. Instead, the player is made to be "unsympathetic" to one side, the Malus. The Malus are thus portrayed as a clan-based society where the strongest rule over the others. This makes them set in their beliefs, and thus excessive violence is the focus of their campaign against the Alyssians, whom they view as inferior. The Alyssians, in contrast, are a society of thinkers and scientists, open to meeting new people and unaccustomed to war. Nevertheless, when it becomes obvious that reasoning with the Malus will not work, they quickly adapt to the situation.

Each ship in O·R·B was designed with a specific purpose, rather than simply having a ship for the sake of it. Ships also act differently depending on what they're engaging. Weapons in the game were also designed to be used strategically: the capital ship-mounted beam weapons will be universally effective, whereas blaster-equipped fighters will have trouble dispatching anything much bigger than another fighter.

To further emphasize careful planning, many activities in O·R·B take several steps to perform. Mining an asteroid requires scanning it, building a resource base to install a mine, and then waiting for freighters to transport the material back to the player's base. Maps were designed to take several minutes to cross. With the enemy base commonly on the opposite end of the map, this was done to make the player commit to an action, and likewise make going back on that decision difficult if it goes bad. Phillipe Charron composed the music for O.R.B.

== Reception ==
Reception

Aggregate score
Aggregator	Score
Metacritic	68/100

Review scores
Publication	Score
Computer Games Magazine	3.5/5
Computer Gaming World	2/5
GameSpot	7.5/10
GameSpy	4/5
GameZone	7.5/10
IGN	7.4/10
Jeuxvideo.com	13/20
Joystick	6/10
PC Gamer (US)	56%
X-Play	3/5

The game received "average" reviews according to the review aggregation website Metacritic. Ron Dulin of GameSpot found the game to be competently executed but generic and lacking imagination.
