= Technology tree =

Diagram used in strategy computer games

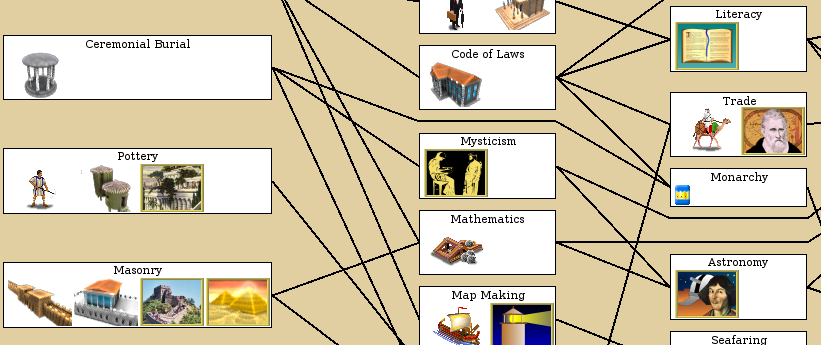
Part of Freeciv's technology tree, showing complex dependencies between technologies. For example, astronomy can be reached by first researching ceremonial burial and then mysticism, or by researching masonry followed by mathematics

In strategy games, a technology, tech, or research tree is a hierarchical visual representation of the possible sequences of upgrades a player can unlock (most typically representing the research progress of a given faction). Because these trees are technically directed and acyclic, they can more accurately be described as a directed acyclic graph of technologies. The diagram is tree-shaped in the sense that it branches between each 'level', allowing the player to choose one sequence or another. Each level is called a tier and is often used to describe the technological strength of a player. Typically, at the beginning of a session of a strategy game, a player will start at tier 1, which offers only a few options for research. Each technology that a player researches will normally open up one or more new options, but may also, depending on the computer game, close off the paths to other options. The tech tree is the representation of all possible paths of research a player can take, up to the culmination of said sequence.

A player who is engaged in research activities is said to be "teching up", "going up the tech tree", or "moving up the tech tree". Analysis of a tech tree can lead players to memorize and use specific build orders.

== Types ==
=== Classic research ===
The Classic tech tree is the one where extensive research into new technologies must be conducted parallel to the progression of a game. Some real-time strategy (RTS) games as well as most turn-based strategy (TBS) games employ this type of tech tree. In these games, players typically have a 'command center', 'unit-training-facility' and 'research facility' at their disposal from the start, allowing them to both start research into more advanced technologies, or engaging in combat with enemies using the basic units (Warzone 2100, Mega Lo Mania, Master of Orion series, Civilization series, Space Empires series).

=== Allocation ===
In some games, the requirement of an actual research facility is absent. In this case players can allocate research points, or in-game resources to purchase new technologies. In some games the allocation yields direct results, meaning that procuring the new technology isn't paired with allotted time for the research of said technology to complete.

=== Building-based ===
In most RTS games the technology tree consists of buildings which must be built in a specific sequence, which in turn unlocks new technologies. These newly unlocked technologies can be more advanced units, upgrades for research or more advanced buildings. (StarCraft, Command & Conquer series.)

=== Prerequisites for technology advances ===
In most types of strategy games, the player needs particular buildings in order to research specific technologies or build specific advanced units (StarCraft, Total Annihilation), while in other games upgrades/technologies are unlocked through research alone (Warzone 2100). In many TBS games the prerequisite is one or more lower-level technologies, with no dependency on specific buildings (Master of Orion series, Civilization series, Space Empires series).

=== Complexity ===
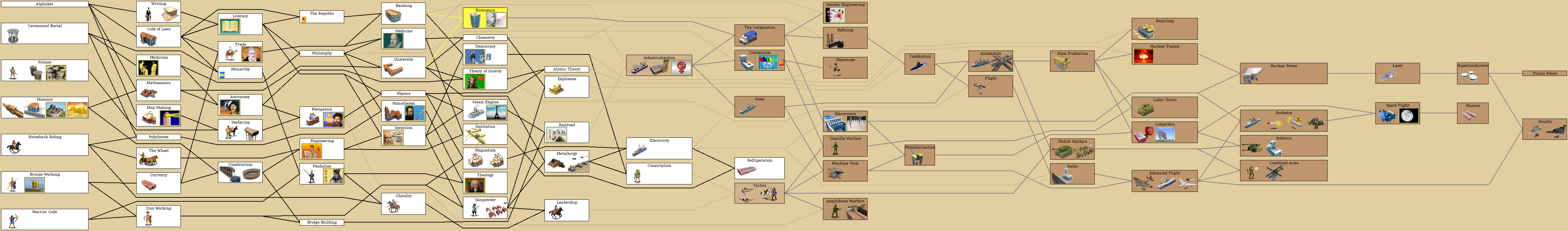
86 technologies on a tech tree in Freeciv

The structures of tech trees vary quite widely. In the simplest cases (e.g. Master of Orion) there are several completely separate research areas and one could research all the way up to the highest level in one area without researching other areas (although this would often be far from ideal). In more complex cases (e.g. Civilization) every technology above the starting level has more than one prerequisite and one has to research most of the lower-level technologies in order to research any of the top-level technologies. And there are many possibilities between these two variants, for example in Space Empires researching to a specified level in one field may enable the player both to research to a higher level in that field and to start research in a new field which was previously not available.

Major 4X games like Civilization and Master of Orion have a much larger technology tree than most other strategy games; as an extreme example, Space Empires III has over 200 technologies.

=== Availability of technologies ===
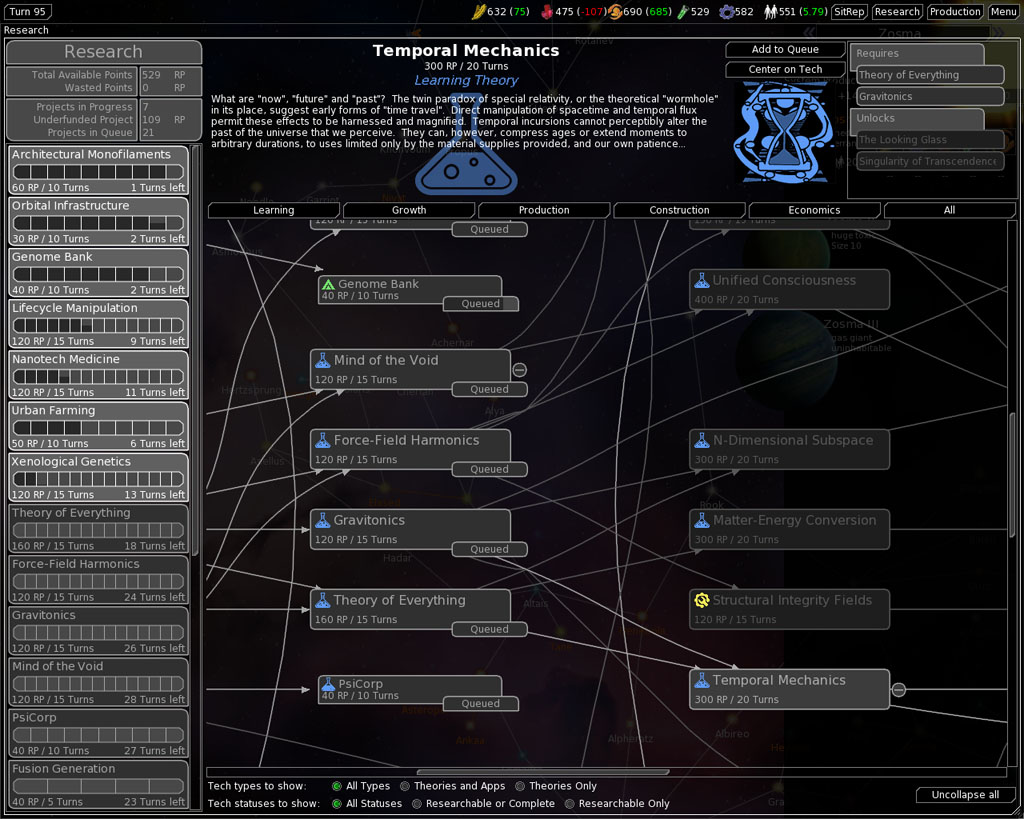
Research screen from FreeOrion, a reimplementation of Master of Orion

Some RTSs make different techs available to different races or cultures (especially StarCraft; but many RTSs have special units or buildings for different cultures, e.g. Age of Empires expansion pack and later versions, Red Alert 2). Most TBSs make all technologies available to all cultures (e.g. Civilization). Master of Orion (original version) is a complex special case in this respect: the full tree is the same for all; but in each game each player gets a subset of the full tech tree that depends on which race was selected.

=== What happens after researching everything ===
In many games there's nothing useful to do and the player may scrap research centers to save maintenance costs and/or devote the resources to something else (Space Empires series).

In later installments of the Civilization series the last technology (called "future tech") represents an amalgamation of all possible future discoveries and can be researched repeatedly. In Civilization V, it increases a player's score, while in Civilization IV it raises the health and the happiness in the empire. Note that to reach the last technology in Civilization V, all spaceship technologies required to win must also have been discovered, so the game will likely be nearing its conclusion.

In the Galactic Civilizations series the final technology solves the nature of existence, and is victory.

In the Master of Orion series more advanced research reduces the size and cost of spaceship components, and "hyper-advanced" research in areas which have military applications therefore enables players to build more high-tech weapons into a given ship size and at lower production cost.

In Rise of Nations, the final four technologies result in such an advantage that the game will likely end quickly. Also, the "knowledge" resource needed to research is also used late in the game to produce cruise missiles and nuclear weapons.

== History ==
Typically the board game Civilization by Francis Tresham (1980) is given the credit of introducing a technology tree. Sid Meier’s Civilization (1991) is considered as an iconic computer turn-based strategy game for using them. Since Civilization, technology trees have been used in various digital games. Likewise, the first creation of a technology tree as a mechanism refers to Civilization.

The arcade shoot 'em up Gradius used a power-up system functionally identical to a tech tree in 1985.

Tech trees started showing up in turn-based strategy games in the early 1990s. The 1991 video game Mega Lo Mania had a tech tree with a system of research levels/epochs that allowed the deployment of better units and defences and is considered to be the first game to combine a technology tree into a Real-time strategy game.

== See also ==
- Timeline of historic inventions
