= Alien Shooter: Vengeance =

2006 video game

- Developer: Sigma Team
- Publishers: Sigma Team (PC); Virtual Programming (Mac OS X)
- Composers: Alexander Shushkov; Nikolay Zmanovsky; Denis Kolobayev
- Platforms: Microsoft Windows; Cloud (OnLive); Mac OS X
- Release: Windows: RUS: September 7, 2006; GER: September 13, 2006; EU: 2007; NA: February 16, 2007; Mac OS X July 2009
- Genre: Top-down shooter
- Mode: Single-player

Alien Shooter: Vengeance (also known as Alien Shooter 2) is a 2006 top-down shooter video game for Microsoft Windows and Mac OS X, developed by Sigma Team as a sequel to Alien Shooter. A modified version called Alien Shooter 2: Reloaded features changed game mechanics and includes a few new levels.

== Gameplay ==
Alien Shooter: Vengeance's gameplay contains many improvements over its predecessor Alien Shooter. Players now have a selection of eight characters to choose from, each character's stats and starting equipment being different from one another. These stats affect, for example, the type of weapons the player may use and how effective they are, or the maximum number of hit points a player can have. Players can earn experience points for killing enemies and completing objectives. After earning enough experience points, the player gains a new level and is allowed to increase their stats.

Items may be bought from shop terminals scattered throughout the levels. Players can visit these stations to purchase weapons, implants (which act to increase a player's stats but are not permanent and can be removed), armor, ammunition and miscellaneous items, such as flashlights or medkits, with money found in the levels or earned from completing objectives. Some items and weapons require certain status levels to be used. For example, to use more lethal weapons, players must meet the weapon's minimum skill requirement in its respective skill in order to use it.

Players are also allowed to pick from a list of perks during the initial character creation. There are total of eight perks for players to choose from - such as health regeneration, thievery, and hypnotism - and once chosen, the player may not change their perk. It then becomes one of the character's stats and can be upgraded as such during the game. Once the game is finished, players may upload their scores to a global scoreboard. If the player used in any cheats during the game, they are labeled as such in the board.

== Plot ==
The game starts with the player arriving at the on-site M.A.G.M.A facility at some point in year 2030. After meeting with the local commander, General Baker, the player goes on their first mission: searching for survivors within the facility while fending off waves of aliens. Non-player characters in this mission include Nicholas, an engineer who provides rewards if the player fulfills his requests, and Kate Lia, a mercenary hired by M.A.G.M.A. who is abducted by the aliens when the player becomes trapped in the facility's computer room. While at the facility the player is also asked to disable a self-destruct program that threatens the facility. Once the program has been shut down, General Baker concludes that the aliens must have a leader, and it is the leader who activated the self-destruct program. The player also discovers that the M.A.G.M.A. Energy Corporation has made a deal with General Baker in sometime, asking him and the rest of the mercenaries to shut the entire base down in return for a large amount of money. The player is then sent to the next facility, the ME2 Base.

After battling through hordes of aliens, the player finally manages to enter the ME2 Base. While clearing more aliens from inside the base, the player is asked to download research data and destroy some experiment capsules. General Baker asks the player to rescue Kate after M.A.G.M.A.'s research is destroyed. He has located an alien breeding ground deep within a coalmine nearby and sends the player and a few soldiers to destroy the breeding ground, eliminate the Alien Queens (Alien Mother Scarabs), and remaining aliens once and for all. Before reaching the final room, the alien's leader and Baker will both tell the player to give them the research disk and the alien leader threatens that Kate will die if the player doesn't give him the disk. After that, the player will need to make a choice.

If the player chooses to go to the alien leader and save Kate, General Baker will scold the player for disobeying him. He also reveals that the downloaded data contains information on how to control the aliens and that he plans to use it. In a confrontation with the player, Baker true goal to rule over mankind was revealed and had to be killed. On their way to save Kate, the player engages the aliens, leading to a final battle in which the player kills the Alien Basilisk (alien leader). After defeating the alien leader, the player discovers that Kate is dead already by the time the player reaches her. The disk containing the data on controlling the aliens and the portals is destroyed. Without the leader control, factions in the alien army have begun to fighting each other instead of attacking humans, enabling human military to take down the disorganized alien force gradually over time. The game ends as cities suffering from alien invasions begin to recover peacefully.

However, if the player decides to go back to General Baker instead of rescuing Kate, the alien leader will send teleporting minions to attack him and gives the player as one final warning. If the player gives Baker the disk, he will teleport away, and M.A.G.M.A. will order the player to find General Baker as quickly as possible. After the player finds the remains of Baker strewn throughout a M.A.G.M.A. base, the Alien Basilisk organizes the alien hordes into a powerful organized army and manages to overrun most of the major cities, causing most of the humans to perish, the Earth Government using nuclear weapons to destroy cities overrun with aliens, and M.A.G.M.A. still trying to recover its experimental energy weapons, all these events being described in the final journal entry of the last human on earth.

== Alien Shooter 2: Reloaded ==
A modified version of the game was released, titled Alien Shooter 2: Reloaded which featured the addition of a few new levels, simplified role-playing system and several minor gameplay changes. This version was originally created in order to make the game more suitable for shareware distribution (with the size of only 400 Mb). The shareware release is no longer available, and a newer digital distribution version is now available which is even further compressed down to a 258 Mb download. Reloaded has less music, no co-op campaign and the multiplayer is also gone. In place it adds a new game mode, Gun Stand, where you fight against waves of enemies using a stationary Sentry which can be upgraded as you progress, there are also additional levels in the main game, however, the levels are all smaller than in Alien Shooter 2.

There is also a mobile version with different game mechanics and more modern graphics.

== Alien Shooter 2: Conscription ==
A stand-alone add-on was released in 2010, titled Alien Shooter 2: Conscription. It features a new campaign, a few new weapons, and new types of monsters. The story is a prequel to the original game, telling the story of a new recruit of the M.A.G.M.A. corporation, who is stationed on one of the military bases. Suddenly, the base is attacked and the player is forced to fight for his life. Later, he is assigned by General John to assist Officer Donaldson and his squad in the protection of a secret bunker. The mission is a failure, all the squad is killed by aliens, and the player heads to the evacuation site, where he is ambushed by his own troops. Surviving the ambush, he heads to the bunker in order to find out what dark secrets are hiding. After discovering the bunker is full of alien eggs, the player, allying himself with Corporal Jane who was also betrayed, destroys the facility and travels to another base using a teleporter device. The player and Jane get separated and the player learns these aliens were being used to fight the invasion. Even though Jane is killed by General John, the player succeeds in defeating both hordes of escaped aliens and General John's personal army. The player confronts General John, who is piloting a giant mech-suit and kills him, and then blows up the bases' reactors. The game ends with the aliens escaping the base, leading up to the events of Alien Shooter: Vengeance.

== Reception ==
Reception

Aggregate scores
Aggregator	Score
GameRankings	70,39%
Metacritic	67/100

Review scores
Publication	Score
4Players	37%
GameDaily	6/10
GameSpot	7.5/10
GameStar	35%
GameZone	7.7/10
IGN	7.5/10
PC Gamer (US)	35%
PC Games (DE)	76%
X-Play	4/5

The PC version received "average" reviews according to the review aggregation website Metacritic.
