= Hoolai Games =

Entertainment company

- Native name: 万达院线游戏
- Type: Private
- Industry: Online/Social/Mobile Gaming
- Founded: 2008
- Founder: Qiao Wanli, Huang Jian; (Founder); Zhang Yu; (CEO)
- Headquarters: Beijing, China
- Number of locations: Shanghai, Tokyo, Guangzhou, Taipei, Silicon Valley
- Website: http://www.hoolaigames.com (English-language) https://global.wdyxgames.com/en-sea

Hoolai Games is a Chinese mid-core social Web and mobile game development company and game publisher founded in 2008 by its CEO Qiao Wanli and President Jian Huang. Hoolai's portfolio of games including its flagship game, Hoolai Three Kingdoms, can be found in game platforms including the iOS App Store, Google Play, Facebook, Renren, and Tencent's Qzone.On May 13, 2016, Wanda Cinema Line Corp. acquired digital media company Hoolai Game Ltd. and released the "Wanda Cinema Game" (万达院线游戏) brand.

== History ==
In December 2008, Hoolai Games was founded by its CEO Qiao Wanli and President Jian Huang.

Hoolai Games' earliest social games, Hoolai Hotel (胡莱旅馆) and Love Thief (偷心贼), saw a moderate degree success. Hoolai Games reportedly sold Hoolai Hotel for several million yuan to an Internet company. In 2010, the proceeds of the acquisition was used to fund a 30-person team in Beijing and the development of Hoolai Three Kingdoms (胡莱三国).

In 2011, Hoolai Three Kingdoms was officially launched in China as a Web game on Tencent's Qzone social gaming platform. After releasing the Facebook version, which among the top Facebook apps shortly after the game's launch, Hoolai's iOS version of Hoolai Three Kingdoms released later that year and became the Apple App Store Rewind's 2011 #1 Grossing iOS game in China. Hoolai Games subsequently entered into a partnership with game publisher GREE, Inc., and Hoolai Three Kingdoms was released in Japan and Korea. According to an interview with Wanli in 2012, Hoolai Three Kingdoms was generating RMB 1 million per day in revenue for Hoolai Games.

With a top-performing game in the Chinese social and mobile gaming market, Jian announced in 2011 that Hoolai Games had raised $20 million in series B financing led by venture capital firms, Sequoia Capital, Greylock Partners, and Bertelsmann AG. Hoolai has since expanded its portfolio of mid-core social and mobile games to include the turn-based strategy, role-playing, and casino gaming games such as Checkmate (将军), War of Immortals (斩仙), and Hoolai Poker (胡莱德州扑克).

In 2011, Hoolai Games and some of its customers were victims of a large credit card fraud scheme, which reduced the company's profits, and resulted in some customers being charged for software they didn't download.

In 2014, Hoolai Games is partly owned by TenCent Holdings.

In 2016, Wanda Cinema Line Corp. acquired digital media company Hoolai Game Ltd.

== Notable games ==
=== Saint Seiya: Legend of Justice（圣斗士星矢：正义传说） ===
Saint Seiya: Legend of Justice (圣斗士星矢：正义传说) is an officially authorized vertical screen hanging card game. Players will relive the original classic plot with the perspective of Saint Seiya. It is currently in public beta in mainland China, Hong Kong, Macao and Taiwan, and the European and American versions will be launched on July 12, 2022.

=== Chinese Super League Series（中超系列） ===
Both CSL 1 (中超风云) and CSL 2 (中超风云2) are Chinese Super League genuine authorized card strategy games. Currently only released in mainland China.

=== Champions Manager Mobasa（豪门足球风云） ===
FIFPro genuine license. It is a card placement 3D football mobile game and has been launched in mainland China, Southeast Asia, Europe and the Americas.

=== Hoolai Three Kingdoms ===
Hoolai Three Kingdoms (胡莱三国) is free-to-play resource management and social war strategy game set an alternative interpretation of China's historical three kingdoms. Players are tasked to build their own cities, train armies, and wage war against friends and other players on the battlefield.

=== War of Immortals ===
War of Immortals (斩仙) is a massively multiplayer ARPG game in China with side-scrolling gameplay. Players must one of many customizable avatars and treck War of Immortals' fantasy world completing quests, while battling enemies in the form of NPCs and other players within an ancient Chinese storyline. Players can also raise pets that offer additional benefits (including damage) in battles.

=== Checkmate ===
Checkmate (将军) is a free-to-play World War II turn-by-turn strategy iPad game. Players can assume the role of a general commanding an Allied or Axis army from World War II, reclaiming invaded territories in Europe. As a PvP game, Checkmate supports PvE single player campaigns, however the game includes guild-style social game features, with which players can battle players from opposing factions.

=== Hoolai Poker ===
Hoolai Poker (胡莱德州扑克) is a social gambling platform. Its current primary poker game is Texas Hold'em. The game deals strictly in virtual currency, however competitive players can participate in tournament events with the chance of winning real life prizes. For casual play, Hoolai Poker offers other poker variants including Caribbean Poker and Video Poker.

=== Wartune ===
Wartune is a hybrid strategy MMORPG (massively multiplayer online role-playing game) originally developed by Chinese studio 7th Road. First launched as a browser-based game around 2011, Wartune combines city-building mechanics with turn-based combat, character progression, PvP arenas, multiplayer dungeons, and large-scale guild battles. It gained widespread popularity on Western web platforms like Facebook, Kongregate, and Kabam.com, and was hosted by multiple publishers including R2Games, Armor Games, and Proficient City.

In late 2013, a mobile adaptation of the game titled Wartune: Hall of Heroes was co-developed by Hoolai Games and 7th Road, designed specifically for mobile play with optimized controls and shorter gameplay sessions. The Chinese release proved commercially successful, with Wartune accounting for approximately 40% of Hoolai's mobile revenue in early 2014. The game's launch coincided with a significant surge in Hoolai's mobile earnings, which tripled over three consecutive quarters.

In June 2014, Hoolai licensed publishing rights to Kabam for international markets. Kabam released Wartune: Hall of Heroes on iOS and Android across North America and Europe, where it quickly became a top-grossing app, generating approximately $7 million per month from in-app purchases in English-speaking regions. This release was also part of Kabam's broader strategy to invest in successful Asian games and bring them to Western audiences through its $50 million Asian development fund.

The Wartune franchise later expanded with additional updates and reboots, including Wartune Reborn in 2019, which offered improved graphics, new content, and refined gameplay while preserving the classic features of the original browser game.

== Awards and recognition ==
- In 2012 Hoolai won Red Herring's Top 100 Asia award, which recognizes the year's most promising private technology ventures in the Asian business region.
- War of Immortals placed within the top five games in the 2012 Golden Page Award's categories of "2012's Top Ten Web Games" and "2012's Most Popular RPGs."
- Checkmate was the top grossing iPad game in China according to Apple's 2012 App Store Rewind.
- Hoolai Three Kingdoms was recognized as the Top Grossing iOS game in China by Apple's 2011 App Store Rewind.
