= Space Empires: Starfury =

2003 video game

- Developer: Malfador Machinations
- Publisher: Shrapnel Games
- Series: Space Empires
- Platform: Windows
- Release: NA: October 3, 2003
- Genres: Turn-based strategy, 4X
- Mode: Single-player

Space Empires: Starfury is a 4X turn-based strategy computer game developed by Malfador Machinations and published by Shrapnel Games on September 22, 2003. The game is set in a Space Empires universe containing planetary systems linked by warp points, or wormholes. The game allows the player to control a single spaceship to explore the universe.

== Gameplay ==
In Space Empires: Starfury, the player controls a single spaceship in real-time, as opposed to controlling an entire intergalactic empire in a 4X turn-based fashion as seen in previous games in the Space Empires series. Gameplay involves traveling between planets, accepting missions, and customizing the spaceship's hull slots with component modules of weapons, armor, shields, engines, and other modules such as life support, crew quarters, combat sensors, long range sensors, ECM, etc. Ship design is restricted by the ship's total tonnage capacity. Each purchasable spaceship features different hull configurations, each with different patterns for weapon hard points and weapon firing arcs. Various types of space vessels are featured in-game, such as small fighter craft, cargo ships, pirate ships, and space stations. Some of these, however, cannot be controlled by the player.

The player's commander is able to level up, with each level granting attribute points of the player's choosing. There are multiple campaigns contained within a single storyline that the player can progress through, or the player can choose to roam the universe freely. The game features 24-bit three-dimensional graphics, but movement is restricted to two dimensions.

== Plot ==
The player works undercover for the TCN (Terran Confederation Navy) to determine the cause of a recent escalation of pirate attacks in the Neutral territories. The player travels to different colonies and starbases, performing various missions that advance the story. Missions range in difficulty level from simple reconnaissance to taking part in large fleet battles.

== Development ==
Space Empires: Starfury is the first game developed by Malfador Machinations to use three-dimensional graphics. The game was initially planned as the combat engine for Space Empires V, but it was decided that it was not "deep" enough for that purpose. Instead, the game evolved into a single-ship-based game, set in the Space Empires universe.

The developers created the game with the idea in mind that players could easily mod the game to their liking.

== Reception ==
Reception

Aggregate score
Aggregator	Score
Metacritic	68/100

Review scores
Publication	Score
PC Gamer	82/100
GameZone	70/100
PC GameWorld	80/100

The game has been reviewed as a solid, action-packed game with colorful graphics. Some reviewers say that the gameplay is straightforward, while others say the game fails at creating the realism of moving a ship through space.
