= Space Empires V =

2006 video game

- Developer: Malfador Machinations
- Publisher: Strategy First
- Designer: Aaron Hall
- Series: Space Empires
- Platform: Windows
- Release: NA: October 16, 2006; EU: February 9, 2007
- Genre: Turn-based strategy
- Modes: Single player, Multiplayer

Space Empires V (SEV) is a 4X turn based strategy game that was released in 2006. It was developed by Malfador Machinations and published by Strategy First. The game retains many races and technologies from its predecessor, Space Empires IV (SEIV).

== Gameplay ==
While Space Empires V retains much of its predecessor's gameplay, there are several key differences. It is the first Space Empires game to use three-dimensional graphics, and as such, the user interface has been heavily redesigned. New to the series is a 3D real-time combat engine, and the player can now control ground combat in addition to the usual space battles. The empire-building aspects of the game borrows as much from the third instalment as it does from the fourth, with research and intelligence being assigned as a percentage of available points as opposed to the queue system used for construction.

== Races ==
Virtually all of the stock races (with the exception of the Sithrak) are updated versions of SEIV races. Custom race creation is basically the same as in the previous games, with two notable changes - you must now select a government type in addition to a social paradigm, and the game master may grant players a set number of research points to improve starting technology. As of now, there are comparatively few player-created shipsets, arguably a consequence of the switch to 3D graphics.

== Reception ==
The game received mixed reviews. Several have complained that the game is over-complex and overloads the player with options, especially while setting up a new game, and that it may not be suitable for players who are new to 4X games.
