= Space Empires IV =

2000 video game

- Developer: Malfador Machinations
- Publishers: Shrapnel Games, Strategy First
- Series: Space Empires
- Platform: Windows
- Release: November 7, 2000
- Genres: Turn-based strategy, 4X
- Modes: Single-player, multiplayer

Space Empires IV is a turn-based 4X strategy computer game developed by Malfador Machinations and published by Strategy First as part of the Space Empires series in which players control an alien race in an attempt at galactic conquest.

== Gameplay ==
The gameplay is similar to Civilization style games in the sense that one controls the overall organization of the alien race on a scale far above that of controlling individual persons. Combat is not necessitated by the game itself and players are free to engage in political negotiations with their rivals. The mechanics of the game allow players to either improve their planets' resource production through the construction of facilities or build more ships with which to defend their empires.

Gameplay screenshot

There are multiple ways that players can conquer other empires, depending on the setting enabled by the player during set up. The most direct way is destroying the colonies and home world of their rivals using ever more devastating weapons. Further along the tech tree this is facilitated by technology, allowing the player to destroy planets whole and manipulate stars turning entire systems into black holes or storms. Other ways to win include diplomatic allying with all races and maintaining peace throughout the universe (a difficult feat with rival computer players fighting amongst themselves).

== Mechanisms ==
In Space Empires IV the galaxy is represented by a number of discrete areas called "systems" which represent complete star systems. These are usually connected to each other by "warp points" through which a ship or fleet can travel to another system. The standard system comprises a number of stars, planets, asteroids, storms and warp points. Some stars may be more prone to going supernova which will destroy the entire system, or may cause effects to ships passing by. Planets are either ice, rock or gas types, with an atmosphere of none, hydrogen, oxygen, methane or carbon dioxide. They range in size of tiny, small, medium, large, and huge. Planets also have "conditions", the quality of which affects the rate of reproduction for inhabitants and their happiness on the world. A planet also has a number of values for "mineral", "organic" and "radioactive" content. Once colonized, a player may build facilities to mine these resources on a world. The rate of production of each resource is modified by the values for each planet.

== Races ==
The quickstart screen

Space Empires IV allows the player to select one of a variety of alien races to represent them and then compete against a selection of the others. As well as the usual human race, the Terrans, there are a number of races which are otherwise notable due to their propensity for successful play. The Praetorian empire will often become a very formidable rival due to their expansionist tendencies and peaceful nature. Likewise the Eee consortium's high intelligence will often grant them technological superiority in the late game. By contrast the Xi-Chung hive's aggressive tendencies and technologies generally make them dangerous foes in the early game only.

== Technology ==
In Space Empires IV an empire's facilities and ships become steadily more powerful, efficient and varied as they conduct scientific research. This is simulated by the turn-by-turn production of research points which can be channeled towards specific projects. When the project is completed the player is rewarded with new or better facilities, ship components or new research projects. Most fields can be advanced multiple times, becoming progressively more expensive but yielding better results. The large size of the "technology tree" system allows for a high degree of technological variation between empires.

Some empires have access to special research lines known as the "racial techs". In the standard games the racial techs are Organic, Crystalline, Psychic, Temporal and Deeply Religious. By researching these lines the empire gains access to facilities and ship components not available to other empires. Often these are very powerful, such as the Organic Armor, Religious Talisman and Allegiance Subverter ship components.

== Reception ==
In 2003, writer Mark H. Walker noted that Shrapnel Games had "made serious money" with Space Empires IV. He cited Shrapnel itself as a success story for Internet-based game distribution, alongside Battlefront.com.

The editors of Computer Gaming World nominated Space Empires IV as the best strategy game of 2000, although it lost to Sacrifice. They described Space Empires IV as "very old-school", and noted its "almost obsessive level of micromanagement." The Wargamer named it as the best turn-based strategy game of 2000 and overall best strategy game of 2000 (tie with Age of Empires II: The Conquerors).
