= Strategy First =

Canadian video game publisher

Strategy First Inc.
- An iteration of the original Strategy First logo that was painted gold and made 3D so that it could be rotated on the company's website.
- Company type: Subsidiary
- Industry: Video games
- Founded: 1988; 38 years ago
- Founders: Don McFatridge; Steve Wall; Dave Hill
- Headquarters: Montreal, Quebec, Canada
- Area served: Worldwide
- Key people: Emanuel Wall (director)
- Products: See List of Strategy First games
- Parent: Silverstar Holdings (2005–present)
- Website: http://www.strategyfirst.com/

Strategy First Inc. is a Canadian video game publisher based in Montreal. Founded in 1988 by Don McFatridge, Steve Wall and Dave Hill, the company filed for bankruptcy in 2004 and was subsequently acquired by Silverstar Holdings in 2005. Initially specializing in developing strategy video games, it since switched to primarily publishing, releasing games like the Disciples series, the Jagged Alliance series, O.R.B: Off-World Resource Base, and the Space Empires series.

== History ==
The original logo for Strategy First; each character represents one of the four founding partners, as well as a strategy sub-genre the company intended to develop.

Strategy First was founded by Don McFatridge, Steve Wall and Dave Hill, three board game designers. During one lunch break in 1988, they decided that they would begin their careers anew, establishing Strategy First as a video game development company. Richard Therrien joined as a partner shortly thereafter. The four wished to focus on strategy video games and named the company accordingly.

Strategy First acquired Midnight Software in 1997.

By May 2004, Strategy First had amassed over US$5 million in debt and had shrunk from more than 100 employees in three offices to sixteen staff in its primary office in Montreal. The debts included almost $4 million owed to investors, as well as $1.7 million owed to developers. As a result, Strategy First filed for bankruptcy on 4 August 2004. Due to this insolvency, multiple developers, including Stardock and Paradox Interactive, did not receive royalties for their respective games published by Strategy First. Subsequently, Polish developer Techland cut all ties with Strategy First, disallowing Strategy First from distributing any Techland product, effective on 18 September.

Silverstar Holdings, a public company based in Boca Raton, Florida, that specialized in the acquisition of pay-to-play businesses, announced on 22 April 2005 that it had acquired Strategy First from the bankruptcy proceedings. The company contributed $600,000 in cash and 400,000 shares of common stock to Strategy First's creditors, while also assuming $400,000 of Strategy First's existing debt. Clive Kabatznik, the chief executive officer (CEO) of Silverstar Holdings, stated that the company intended to use Strategy First as a niche publisher, in parallel to its other recent acquisition, Empire Interactive, which Kabatznik described as a "more fully fledged publisher". In April 2005, Strategy First acquired and absorbed all assets of Santa Rosa, California-based developer Malfador Machinations. That company's president and CEO, Aaron Hall, joined Strategy First's management team as a result.

In March 2009, Silverstar Holdings was delisted from the NASDAQ stock exchange. Subsequently, Empire Interactive was put into administration in May, with 49 out of 55 positions terminated.
