= List of tactical role-playing video games: 1995 to 1999 =

This is a comprehensive index of commercial tactical role-playing games (Tactical RPGs), sorted chronologically by year. Information regarding release platform, release type, game setting, developers, publishers, and country of origin is provided where available. The table can be sorted by clicking on the small boxes next to the column headings.

== Legend ==
Video game platforms
DC	Dreamcast	DOS	DOS / MS-DOS	GB	Game Boy
GG	Game Gear	N64	Nintendo 64, iQue Player	PC98	PC-9800 series
PCFX	PC-FX	PS1	PlayStation 1	SAT	Sega Saturn
SNES	Super Nintendo / Super; Famicom / Super Comboy	WIN	Microsoft Windows, all versions Windows 95 and up	WS	WonderSwan

Types of releases
Compilation	A compilation, anthology or collection of several titles, usually (but not always) belonging to the same series
Early access	A game launched in early access is unfinished and thus might contain bugs and glitches or have some of the content missing
Episodic	An episodic video game that is released in batches over a period of time
Expansion	A large-scale DLC to an already existing game that adds new story, areas and additions and/or changes to the game's mechanics
Full release	A full release of a game that launched in early access first
Limited	A special release (often called "Limited" or "Collector's Edition") with bonus collector's material. Often provided to people who pre-order a game
Port	The game first appeared on a different platform and a port was made. The game is like the original, with few or no differences
Remake	The game is an enhanced remake of an original, made using new engine and/or assets and thus containing completely new sound, graphics and possibly changes to the story and/or gameplay
Remaster	The game is a remaster of an original, released on the same or different platform, with minor changes to graphics, sound and/or gameplay
Rerelease	The game was re-released on the same platform with no or only minor changes

== List ==
Year	Title	Developer	Publisher	Setting	Platform	Series/Notes
1995 (JP)	2nd Super Robot Wars G	Banpresto	Banpresto	Sci-Fi	GB (Remake)	Remake of 2nd Super Robot Wars.
1995 (JP)	4th Super Robot Wars	Banpresto	Banpresto	Sci-Fi	SNES	Remake of 3rd Super Robot Wars.
1995 (JP)	Arc the Lad	G-Craft	SCE	Fantasy	PS1	Series debuts.
1995 (JP)	Ball Bullet Gun: Survival Game Simulation			Sci-Fi	SNES	
1995 (JP)	Langrisser, Der; Langrisser II デア ラングリッサー	Masaya	NCS	Fantasy	SNES (Remake)	Remake of Langrisser II for GEN. Sequel to Warsong.
1995 (JP)	Farland Story	TGL	Banpresto	Fantasy	SNES (Port)	Port of Farland Story for DOS. Series debuts.
1995 (JP)	Farland Story 2 Farland Story Denki: Arc Ou no Ensei	TGL	Banpresto	Fantasy	SNES (Port)	Port of Farland Story Denki: Arc Ou no Ensei for DOS; Sequel to Farland Story.
1995 (JP)	Farland Story: Daichi no Kizuna; Farland Story 5	TGL	TGL	Fantasy	DOS	Sequel to Farland Story: Shirogane no Tsubasa.
1995 (TW)	Flame Dragon 2: Legend of Golden Castle		Dynasty	Fantasy	DOS	Sequel to Flame Dragon: Demon's Seal.
1995 (JP)	Front Mission	Square	Square	Sci-Fi	SNES	Series debuts.
1995 (JP)	Heian Fuuunden 平安風雲伝	KSS	KSS	Fantasy	SNES	
1995 (NA)	Jagged Alliance: Deadly Games	Sir-Tech	Sir-Tech	Modern	DOS	Spin-off of Jagged Alliance.
1995 (JP)	Kou Ryuu Ki	Koei		Fantasy	SNES	
1995 (JP)	Little Master 3 リトルマスター〜虹色の魔石〜		Tokuma Shoten	Fantasy	SNES	Sequel to Little Master 2.
1995 (JP)	Majin Tensei II: Spiral Nemesis 魔神転生II SPIRAL NEMESIS	Atlus	Atlus	Fantasy	SNES	Sequel to Majin Tensei
1995 (??)	Mystaria: The Realms of Lore; Blazing Heroes; Riglord Saga	Microcabin	Sega	Fantasy	SAT	Series debuts.
1995 (JP)	Sengoku Cyber: Fujimaru Jigokuhen 戦国サイバー 藤丸地獄変	Sony	Sony	Historical	PS1	
1995 (JP)	Shining Force Gaiden: Final Conflict	Sonic!	Sega	Fantasy	GG	Set between Shining Force and Shining Force II.
1995 (JP)	Tactics Ogre: Let Us Cling Together	Quest	Atlus	Fantasy	SNES	
1995 (JP)	Tenchi Muyo! Game-hen	Banpresto		Fantasy	SNES	
1995 (KR)	War of Genesis, The	Softmax	Softmax	Fantasy	DOS	Series debuts.
1995 (NA/EU)	X-COM: Terror from the Deep	MicroProse	MicroProse	Sci-Fi	DOS	Sequel to X-COM: UFO Defense.
1995 (NA/EU); 1997 (JP)	X-COM: UFO Defense	MicroProse	MicroProse; MediaQuest	Sci-Fi	PS1 (Port)	Port of X-COM: UFO Defense for AMI. Series debuts.
1996 (JP)	Arc the Lad II	ARC	SCEI	Fantasy	PS1	Sequel to Arc the Lad.
1996 (JP)	Bahamut Lagoon バハムートラグーン	Square	Square	Fantasy	SNES	
1996 (NA)	Birthright: The Gorgon's Alliance	Synergistic	Sierra	Fantasy	DOS, WIN	RTS/RPG.
1996 (JP)	Densetsu no Ogre Battle	Quest	Riverhill Software	Fantasy	SAT (Port)	Port of Ogre Battle: March of the Black Queen for SNES.
1996 (JP)	Langrisser, Der; Langrisser II	Masaya	NCS	Fantasy	PCFX (Remake)	Remake of Langrisser II for GEN. Sequel to Warsong.
1996 (NA)	Dragon Force ドラゴンフォース	Sega	Working Designs	Fantasy	SAT	
1996 (JP)	Dragon Knight IV ドラゴンナイト4	ELF	Banpresto	Fantasy	SNES (Port)	Eroge. Port of Dragon Knight IV for PC98. Sequel to Dragon Knight III.
1996 (JP)	Energy Breaker	Neverland		Fantasy	SNES	
1996 (JP)	Farland Saga: Toki no Douhyou	TGL	TGL	Fantasy	DOS	Continuation of the Farland Story series.
1996 (JP)	Farland Story: Kamigami no Isen; Farland Story 6	TGL	TGL	Fantasy	DOS	Sequel to Farland Story: Daichi no Kizuna.
1996 (JP)	FEDA Remake!: Emblem of Justice	Yanoman		Fantasy	SAT (Remake)	Remake of FEDA: Emblem of Justice.
1996 (JP)	Fire Emblem: Seisen no Keifu	Intelligent	Nintendo	Fantasy	SNES	
1996 (JP)	Langrisser III ラングリッサーIII	Masaya	NCS	Fantasy	SAT	Prequel to Warsong.
1996 (JP)	Metajo	R-Force	R-Force	Fantasy	PC98	
1996 (JP)	Monstania	Amccus; Bits Laboratory	Pack-In-Video	Fantasy	SNES	
1996 (JP)	Riglord Saga 2	Microcabin	Sega	Fantasy	SAT	Sequel to Mystaria: The Realms of Lore.
1996 (JP)	Sakura Taisen	Sega	Sega; Red Ent.	Steampunk	SAT	Series debuts.
1996 (JP)	Shin Super Robot Wars	Banpresto	Banpresto	Sci-Fi	PS1	
1996 (JP)	Super Robot Taisen Gaiden: Masō Kishin - The Lord Of Elemental	Banpresto	Banpresto	Sci-Fi	SNES	
1996 (JP)	Tactics Ogre: Let Us Cling Together	Quest	Riverhill Software	Fantasy	SAT (Port)	Port of Tactics Ogre: Let Us Cling Together for SNES.
1996 (JP)	Treasure Hunter G	Sting	Square	Fantasy	SNES	
1996 (JP); 1997 (NA/EU)	Vandal Hearts	Konami	Konami	Fantasy	PS1	
1996 (EU)	X-COM: Terror from the Deep	MicroProse	MicroProse	Sci-Fi	PS1 (Port)	Port of X-COM: Terror from the Deep for DOS. Sequel to X-COM: UFO Defense.
1996 (EU)	X-COM: Unknown Terror	Mythos	MicroProse	Sci-Fi	DOS (Comp)	Compilation of X-COM: UFO Defense and X-COM: Terror from the Deep for DOS.
1997 (JP)	BS Fire Emblem: Akaneia Senki	Intelligent	Nintendo	Fantasy	SNES	Prequel to Fire Emblem: Ankoku Ryū to Hikari no Ken and Fire Emblem: Monshō no Nazo.
1997 (JP)	Dark Law: Meaning of Death	ASCII	ASCII	Fantasy	SNES	
1997 (JP)	Dragon Knight IV ドラゴンナイト4	ELF	Banpresto	Fantasy	PS1 (Port)	Eroge. Port of Dragon Knight IV for PC98. Sequel to Dragon Knight III.
1997 (JP)	Dragon Knight IV ドラゴンナイト4	ELF	NEC	Fantasy	PCFX (Port)	Eroge. Port of Dragon Knight IV for PC98. Sequel to Dragon Knight III.
1997 (JP)	Farland Saga 2: Toki no Michishirube	TGL	TGL	Fantasy	WIN	Sequel to Farland Saga: Toki no Douhyou.
1997 (JP)	Farland Story	TGL	TGL	Fantasy	PS1 (Port)	Port of Farland Story for DOS. Series debuts.
1997 (JP)	FEDA 2: White Surge the Platoon	Yanoman		Fantasy	PS1	Sequel to FEDA: Emblem of Justice.
1997 (JP); 1998 (NA)	Final Fantasy Tactics ファイナルファンタジータクティクス	Square	Square; SCE	Fantasy	PS1	
1997 (JP)	Front Mission 2	Square	Square	Sci-Fi	PS1	Sequel to Front Mission.
1997 (JP)	Galaxy Fraulein Yuna 3: Lightning Angel	Hudson Soft		Sci-Fi	SAT	Sequel to Galaxy Fraulein Yuna II: Eternal Princess.
1997 (NA)	Incubation: The Wilderness Missions	Blue Byte	Blue Byte	Sci-Fi	WIN	Expansion to Incubation: Time Is Running Out; Part of the Battle Isle series.
1997 (NA)	Incubation: Time Is Running Out	Blue Byte	Blue Byte	Sci-Fi	WIN	Part of the Battle Isle series.
1997 (JP)	Langrisser IV ラングリッサーIV	CareerSoft		Fantasy	SAT, PS1	Sequel to Langrisser III
1997 (JP)	Langrisser I & II ラングリッサーI&II			Fantasy	PS1 (Remake)	Remake and compilation of Langrisser and Langrisser II for GEN.
1997 (JP); 1998 (NA)	Master of Monsters: Disciples of Gaia	ASCII	ASCII; Toshiba	Fantasy	PS1	
1997 (JP); 1998 (NA)	Ogre Battle: Limited Edition	Enix		Fantasy	PS1 (Comp)	Compilation of Ogre Battle: The March of the Black Queen and Tactics Ogre: Let Us Cling Together.
1997 (JP)	Ronde 輪舞曲	MIT	Atlus	Fantasy	SAT	
1997 (JP); 1998 (NA/EU)	Shining Force III	Camelot	Sega	Fantasy	SAT	Sequel to Shining the Holy Ark.
1997 (JP)	Söldnerschild S	Koei		Fantasy	SAT	
1997 (JP)	Super Robot Wars F	Banpresto	Banpresto	Sci-Fi	SAT	
1997 (JP); 1998 (NA)	Tactics Ogre: Let Us Cling Together	Quest	Atlus	Fantasy	PS1 (Port)	Port of Tactics Ogre: Let Us Cling Together for SNES.
1997 (JP)	Vandal Hearts	Konami	Konami	Fantasy	SAT (Port)	Port of Vandal Hearts for PS1.
1997 (JP); 1998 (TW/KR)	Vantage Master ヴァンテージ・マスター	Nihon Falcom	Nihon Falcom	Fantasy	WIN	Series debuts.
1997 (JP)	Vantage Master V2; Vantage Master Online	Nihon Falcom		Fantasy	WIN	Sequel to Vantage Master.
1997 (KR)	War of Genesis 2, The	Softmax	Softmax	Fantasy	DOS	Sequel to The War of Genesis.
1997 (NA)	X-COM: Apocalypse	Mythos	MicroProse	Sci-Fi	DOS, WIN	Real-time (optional). Sequel to X-COM: Terror from the Deep.
1998 (JP)	Black/Matrix	Flight-Plan	NEC	Fantasy	SAT, PS1	
1998 (JP)	Brave Saga II ブレイブサーガ2	Takara		Sci-Fi	PS1	Sequel to Shin Sedai Robot Senki: Brave Saga.
1998 (NA)	Brigandine: The Legend of Forsena	Hearty Robin	Atlus	Fantasy	PS1	
1998 (JP)	Castle Fantasia	Studio E-Go!	Studio E-Go!	Fantasy	WIN	Eroge. Series debuts.
1998 (JP)	Farland Saga: Toki no Douhyou	TGL	TGL	Fantasy	SAT (Port)	Port of Farland Saga: Toki no Douhyou for DOS. Continuation of the Farland Story series.
1998 (TW)	Flame Dragon Plus: Marks of Wind		Dynasty	Fantasy	DOS	Sequel to Flame Dragon 2: Legend of Golden Castle.
1998 (JP)	Galaxy Fraulein Yuna 3: Final Edition	Hudson Soft		Sci-Fi	PS1 (Port)	Port of Galaxy Fraulein Yuna 3: Lightning Angel. Sequel to Galaxy Fraulein Yuna II: Eternal Princess.
1998 (NA)	Incubation: Hidden Worlds	Blue Byte	Blue Byte	Sci-Fi	WIN (Limit)	Collector's edition version of Incubation: Time Is Running Out; Part of the Battle Isle series.
1998 (JP/NA); 1999 (EU)	Kartia: The Word of Fate; The Legend of Kartia	Atlus	Atlus; Konami	Fantasy	PS1	
1998 (JP)	Langrisser V: The End of Legend ラングリッサーV ～The End of Legend～	Masaya	NCS	Fantasy	SAT	Sequel to Langrisser IV.
1998 (JP)	Langrisser Tribute			Fantasy	SAT (Port)	Port and compilation of Langrisser IV through Langrisser V.
1998 (EU); 1999 (NA)	Magic & Mayhem	Mythos (Julian Gollop)	Virgin; Bethesda	Fantasy	WIN	RTS/RPG.
1998 (JP); 1999 (NA)	Monsterseed	Sunsoft	Sunsoft	Fantasy	PS1	
1998 (JP); 2000 (NA)	Rhapsody: A Musical Adventure	Nippon Ichi	Atlus	Fantasy	PS1	
1998 (JP)	Sakura Taisen 2: Kimi, Shinitamou koto Nakare	Sega	Sega; Red Ent.	Steampunk	SAT	Sequel to Sakura Taisen.
1998 (JP)	Shin Sedai Robot Senki: Brave Saga; Brave Saga	Takara		Sci-Fi	PS1	
1998 (JP)	Shining Force III Scenario 2	Camelot	Sega	Fantasy	SAT	Parallel to Shining Force III.
1998 (JP)	Shining Force III Scenario 3	Camelot	Sega	Fantasy	SAT	Sequel to Shining Force III and Shining Force III Scenario 2.
1998 (JP)	Simulation RPG Construction; SRC	Kei		N/A	WIN	Video game creation suite.
1998 (JP)	Simulation RPG Tsukūru 95	ASCII	ASCII	N/A	WIN	Part of the RPG Maker line of video game creation suites.
1998 (JP)	Simulation RPG Tsukūru	Pegasus Japan	ASCII	N/A	SAT, PS1	Part of the RPG Maker line of video game creation suites.
1998 (JP)	Super Robot Wars F	Banpresto	Banpresto	Sci-Fi	PS1 (Port)	Port of Super Robot Wars F for Sega Saturn.
1998 (JP)	Super Robot Wars F Final	Banpresto	Banpresto	Sci-Fi	SAT	
1998 (JP); 2000 (NA)	Vanguard Bandits	Human; Working	Human; Working	Fantasy	PS1	
1998 (KR)	War of Genesis Side Story I, The: Rhapsody of Zephyr; The Rhapsody of Zephyr	Softmax	Softmax	Fantasy	WIN	
1998 (JP)	Wachenröder	Sega	Sega	Sci-Fi	SAT	
1998 (NA)	X-COM: Collector's Edition	Mythos; MicroProse	MicroProse	Sci-Fi	WIN (Comp)	Compilation of UFO: Enemy Unknown, X-COM: Terror from the Deep and X-COM: Apocalypse.
1998 (NA)	X-COM: UFO Defense	Mythos	MicroProse; Spectrum Holobyte	Sci-Fi	WIN (Port)	Port of X-COM: UFO Defense for AMI. Series debuts.
1999 (JP)	Aizouban Houshinengi	Fu-Qi	KOEI	Fantasy	PS1	
1999 (JP)	Arc the Lad III	ARC	SCEI	Fantasy	PS1	Sequel to Arc the Lad II.
1999 (JP)	Black/Matrix Advanced; Black/Matrix A/D	Flight-Plan	NEC	Fantasy	DC (Remake)	Remake of Black/Matrix for SAT.
1999 (JP)	Castle Fantasia 2: Seima Taisen	Studio E-Go!	Studio E-Go!	Fantasy	WIN	Eroge. Prequel to Castle Fantasia.
1999 (JP)	DeviceReign	Starlight Marry	Media Works	Sci-Fi	SAT, PS1	
1999 (JP); 2000 (UK); 2001 (NA)	Eternal Eyes	TamTam; Alpha-Unit	Sunsoft; TAMM	Fantasy	PS1	
1999 (JP)	Farland Odyssey	TGL	TGL	Fantasy	WIN	Spin-off of the Farland Story series.
1999 (JP)	Farland Saga 2: Toki no Michishirube	TGL	TGL	Fantasy	PS1 (Port)	Port of Farland Saga 2: Toki no Michishirube for WIN. Sequel to Farland Saga: Toki no Douhyou.
1999 (JP)	Fire Emblem: Thracia 776	Intelligent	Nintendo	Fantasy	SNES	Follow-up to Fire Emblem: Seisen no Keifu.
1999 (TW)	Flame Dragon Plus: Marks of Wind	DII		Fantasy	DOS	Sequel to Flame Dragon 2: Legend of Golden Castle.
1999 (JP); 2000 (NA/EU)	Front Mission 3	Square	Square; Square EA	Fantasy	PS1	Sequel to Front Mission 2. First game in the series to be published in North America.
1999 (NA/EU)	Gorky 17; Odium	Metropolis	1C Company; TopWare; Monolith	Fantasy	WIN	
1999 (JP)	Growlanser グローランサー	Atlus	Atlus	Fantasy	PS1	Series debuts.
1999 (NA)	Jagged Alliance 2	Sir-Tech	TalonSoft	Modern	WIN	Sequel to Jagged Alliance.
1999 (JP)	Langrisser Millennium ラングリッサーミレニアム	Masaya	NCS	Fantasy	DC	
1999 (JP)	Little Witching Mischiefs 魔女っ子大作戦	Toys For Bob	Bandai	Fantasy	PS1	
1999 (JP); 2003 (CN)	Mamatoto: A Record of War ママトト -a record of war-	AliceSoft	AliceSoft	Fantasy, Eroge	WIN	
1999 (JP); 2000 (NA)	Ogre Battle 64: Person of Lordly Caliber オウガバトル64 Person of Lordly Caliber; Ōga Batoru Rokujūyon Person of Lordly Caliber	Quest; Nintendo	Atlus	Fantasy	N64	Sequel to Ogre Battle: March of the Black Queen.
1999 (JP)	Ouka Houshin	Media Works		Fantasy	DC	
1999 (JP); 2001 (NA)	Saiyuki: Journey West 西遊記 (さいゆうき)	Koei	Koei	Fantasy	PS1	Based loosely on the novel, Journey to the West.
1999 (JP)	SD Gundam G Generation-0; SD Gundam G Generation-0: G Zero; SDガンダム ジージェネレーション・ゼロ	Bandai	Bandai	Sci-Fi	PS1	
1999 (JP)	Super Robot Wars 64	Banpresto	Banpresto	Sci-Fi	N64	
1999 (JP)	Super Robot Wars Compact	Banpresto	Banpresto	Sci-Fi	WS	
1999 (JP)	Super Robot Wars F Final	Banpresto	Banpresto	Sci-Fi	PS1 (Port)	Port of Super Robot Wars F Final for Sega Saturn.
1999 (JP/NA); 2000 (PAL)	Vandal Hearts II	Konami	Konami	Fantasy	PS1	Sequel to Vandal Hearts.
1999 (NA)	X-COM Collection	Mythos	MicroProse; Mythos	Sci-Fi	WIN (Comp)	Compilation of all X-COM titles to date.
