= Growlanser (video game) =

1999 video game

- Developer: Career Soft
- Publisher: Atlus
- Composer: Noriyuki Iwadare
- Series: Growlanser
- Platforms: PlayStation, Microsoft Windows, PlayStation Portable
- Release: PlayStation: JP: November 25, 1999; JP: December 18, 2003 (in Growlanser Collection); Windows: JP: April 25, 2001; PSP: JP: May 14, 2009
- Genre: Tactical role-playing game
- Mode: Single-player

Growlanser (Note: Japanese: グローランサー, Hepburn: Gurōransā) is a tactical role-playing game for the PlayStation. It was developed by Career Soft and published in Japan by Atlus in 1999. It is the first installment in the Growlanser series, a spiritual successor to the Langrisser series.

Like all Growlanser games, the character art was done by Satoshi Urushihara. The game's music was done by Noriyuki Iwadare, with the opening theme being performed by Rukan Aru, and the ending theme being performed by Ayumi Ootsu. A direct sequel to the game was released in 2001 under the name Growlanser II: The Sense of Justice.

A port to Microsoft Windows was released on April 25, 2001. An enhanced remake of the game for PlayStation Portable was released on May 14, 2009.

== Story ==
Carmaine is a young man living in Rosaria, the capital of the kingdom of Rolandia. Rolandia's palace magician, Lady Sandra, had taken him in as a young orphan and raised him. Once he reaches his majority, Sandra allows him to leave the city, accompanied by her fairy-like homunculus servant, Tipi. Events soon transpire to lead Carmaine far beyond the gates of Rosaria.

In this world, magical energy called Growshu fills the air and people called Growsians can potentially wield magic like in ancient times. Carmaine's younger sister Louise is one such Growsian. Winged people called Featherians also exist, though they live in seclusion from humans. Long ago though, humans and featherians had to cooperate to save their world.

In the course of Carmaine's journeys, he becomes an officer for the King of Rolandia. This leads to the central plot of the game, which focuses on the intrigues and conflicts between the nations of Rolandia, Burnstein, and Ranzack, the forces driving these conflicts forward, and Carmaine's connection to it all.

== Reception ==
RPGFan gave the original Growlanser an 83 out of 100.
