= Growlanser III: The Dual Darkness =

2001 video game

- Developer: Career Soft
- Publishers: JP: Atlus; NA: Working Designs
- Series: Growlanser
- Platform: PlayStation 2
- Release: JP: December 6, 2001; JP: December 18, 2003 (in Growlanser Collection); NA: December 7, 2004 (in Growlanser Generations)
- Genre: Tactical RPG
- Mode: Single-player

Growlanser III: The Dual Darkness (Note: Japanese: グローランサーIII, Hepburn: Gurōransā III) is the third installment to the popular series Growlanser created by Career Soft and published by Atlus, as well as one of the two games released in the United States in Growlanser Generations. Growlanser III, along with Growlanser II: The Sense of Justice, was released under a single title in North America as Growlanser Generations in December 2004. Growlanser II and III were originally planned for separate American releases by Working Designs. Due to opposition from Sony, Working Designs was forced to release both games together. Growlanser III takes place in a land suffering from barren soil and food scarcity, where protagonist Slayn Wilder is rescued and nursed back to health by Anette Burns. When Anette's nation is attacked by invaders desperate for food, she and Slayn are entrusted with securing alliances before things get worse. On their adventure they assemble a group of companions with disparate backgrounds and motivations while delving into the truth of what has happened to their world.

== Gameplay ==
Though similar in some ways to its immediate predecessor in the series, some notable changes to the gameplay were made. Four characters are now used during battles instead of eight, and the most powerful spells require cooperation between two different characters. Additionally, movement through the land now happens on an overland screen rather than on a map with pre-chosen destinations, and the player can now freely move within towns and cities.

Like in Growlanser II, a character's most notable piece of equipment is their Ring Weapon. Each Ring Weapon grants different stat bonuses and has three gem slots. Each gem slot has a level from 0 to 9. If the slot is level 0, no gem can be equipped there, but otherwise the slot can be equipped with a gem of the slot's level or lower. These gems can grant a variety of benefits, such as increasing the damage dealt by a character or decreasing the cost of casting spells.

== Playable characters ==
Slayn Wilder
A boy with amnesia. He is found unconscious at the base of a cliff by Annette and nursed back to health. He also has the ability to see ghosts and spirits. In combat, Slayn wields a large two-handed sword. Slayn's starting stats, abilities and personality are determined by the blood type and constellation chosen by the player at the start of the game; his personality can change over the course of the game depending on the dialogue choices made by the player.

Annette Burns
The daughter of the Xironia Federation's president. Her mother was killed before the start of the main story. She wishes to stop the war between Xironia and Aggressival. She was the one who found Slayn and nursed him back to health, and she wants him to regain his memories. In battle, she wields a Long Sword.

Hugh Foster
A strange man who joins the group in Bibliostock. He likes to tell jokes, which are often not well-received. He wields a saber and has an affinity for wind magic. He can see Raimy, and met Yayoi at some point before the story.

Monika Allenford
A girl who is half-human and half-Featherian. Normal Featherians have full-sized wings and are able to fly, but as a half-Featherian Monika's wings are too small. She is afraid of water as a result of an incident during her childhood in which some Featherian children pushed her off a cliff to try to make her fly. She looks after Michelle Liedbulk, a girl who is unable to leave her sterilized room due to an immune-deficiency disease. In battle, Monika uses throwing knives.

Viktor Hugo
A scientist that helped the Featherians create a device that let them find a new world to settle in order to escape the famines and wars of their dying land. By reading certain books in the Bibliostock Library, Viktor can make special items. One of these items is a Space-Time Summon Device which can be used to import characters from Growlanser II: The Sense of Justice.

Yayoi Tachibana
A shrine maiden from the East. She is pursuing a woman named Simone who used to work at her shrine. She is the last character to join the party. In battle, Yayoi wields a bow.

Raimy
A Dark Fairy that Slayn meets in the town of Schwartzhaas. As a fairy, most people are unable to see Raimy, so she asks for Slayn's help once she realizes that he can see her. While she is not a playable character in battle like the others, there are some missions in which the player can control her as a scout.
