= Growlanser II: The Sense of Justice =

2001 video game

- Developer(s): Career Soft
- Publisher(s): JP: Atlus; NA: Working Designs
- Series: Growlanser
- Platform(s): PlayStation 2
- Release: JP: July 26, 2001; JP: December 18, 2003 (in Growlanser Collection); NA: December 7, 2004 (in Growlanser Generations)
- Genre(s): Tactical RPG
- Mode(s): Single-player

Growlanser II: The Sense of Justice is the second game of the Growlanser series of video games developed by Career Soft. It is the first game of the series to be a tactical role-playing game, but maintains several features from the first game, such as branching storylines and multiple endings. The series is often likened to the dating sim genre, as the player character will often be paired with a single NPC. As a direct sequel to the first Growlanser, nearly all of the characters seen in the first game make a returning appearance as both playable and non-playable characters.

Growlanser II, along with Growlanser III: The Dual Darkness, were released under a single title in North America, titled Growlanser Generations in December 2004. Growlanser II and III were originally planned for separate American releases by publisher Working Designs, but due to opposition from Sony, Working Designs was forced to release both games together. Working Designs opted to add an Auto-Battle feature to both games, as well as enhanced voice acting options, such as the ability to switch voice acting on or off for specific characters. Each game also had a newly added gallery of artwork, vocal outtakes (a staple of Working Designs titles), and music available upon completion.

== Story summary ==
Taking place at the same time as the first Growlanser game, Growlanser II focuses on the war between the kingdoms of Rolandia and Burnstein. While the story in the first game concentrated on the kingdom of Rolandia, Growlanser II focuses on Wein Cruz, an aspiring knight of Burnstein. After Wein and his new comrade-in-arms, Maximillian Schneider, pass their knight entrance exams, the game skips forward one year to the end of the war. Wein and Max, now good friends, discuss their plans for the future. Wein intends to become an Imperial Knight - the highest-ranking knight directly under King Elliote's command. However, Max has developed a distaste for battles and intends to try to attain a position of influence so that he can prevent wars from ever occurring. Both friends recognize the merit behind the other's choice and part amicably.

Wein, about to begin his career as a commander, reports to his superior to receive the first recruits under his command. The two turn out to be Hans Bearnt, an enthusiastic boy Wein rescued during his practical exams; and Charlone Claudius, a serious girl whose aristocratic father disapproves of her choice to join the military. Wein silently bemoans this turn of events, but decides to make the most of it. The first mission for the trio comes from a corrupt commander who dislikes them, sending the three on a mission that was intended for at least ten soldiers.

Along the way, they are framed for breaking a dam that led to the destruction of a village, and are hunted as criminals. They escape to Rolandia where they meet up with Xenos Langley and his sister Karene. Since Wein and company helped Xenos rescue Karene from bandits, Xenos agrees to use his influence to clear their name. Xenos was a companion of Carmaine Fallsmyer (the main character from the previous game), and helped to save the world from the malevolent being Gevas during the last war.

Before they can return to Burnstein, however, they meet up with a figure from Wein's past. When Wein was a young boy, he made friends with an older girl named Arieta, who taught him to play music. Wein, who had developed something of a crush on her, had to say good-bye to her under unusual circumstances. When he meets her again, she stills appears the same age she did as before, and is attacking a village mercilessly with her formidable magic powers. The companions save the village with the help of a local mage named Riviera Marius, but Arieta escapes. Confused, Wein and the party continue on to clear their name. After the King pardons them, he assigns them a new mission and appoints Carmaine, the Savior of Light, to aid them.

It is at this point that the most significant branching storyline point occurs. The party meets up with the mercenary Wolfgang, whose goal is to create a small neutral country so that mercenaries will have a place to be accepted. Wein can choose to either fight against him, or aid his cause. In the more likely case of Wein standing against Wolfgang, the events leading up to war between the nations are found out to be the fault of Wolfgang's plotting.

Meanwhile, darker forces are at work, when the party finds out that Wein's old friend Arieta has actually been possessed by Gevas, the dark being who was one of the original inhabitants of the world. Depending on the party's actions, they can either save her or kill her to defeat Gevas. With the party distracted by this, Wolfgang's plans have nearly come to fruition, and war is at hand. Wein's party, along with aid from Max and the soldiers of Burnstein, take down the mercenaries and reclaim the powerful artifact Wolfgang was using to hold his new country in captivity.

One final twist occurs when Max, tired of how easily humans jump into wars, decides to use the artifact's power to control the minds of all people, and make them live a peaceful existence. Wein can choose to either go along with Max's plan or to stand against him. In the case of the former, Max succeeds in turning the world into a group of mindless puppets, but a new sequence develops in which Wein reconsiders his support of Max and decides to join the resistance led by his former party members. If Wein stands against Max, the world is allowed to quietly continue on rebuilding after the war, and Wein's future is determined by which character he has the highest relationship with. There are eight possible character-endings. Charlone, Riviera, and Arieta's endings must be obtained before the other endings (Hans, Xenos, Carmaine, Ernest, Brett) become available.

== Characters ==
Wein Cruz (ウェイン・クルーズ)

- Age: 17
- Height: 172 cm
- Ring Weapon: Scythe

A young knight-in-training of Burnstein. His mother dies before the start of the game. He lives alone, occasionally receiving letters from his archaeologist father. Wein has a great interest in ruins thanks to his father. However, his dream is to become an Imperial Knight, the most prestigious and highest-ranking knight in Burnstein, who report directly to the King and act as his bodyguards. Wein meets Max while in training and the two become good friends.

Wein met the mysterious Growsian maiden Arieta Lyuis when he was a young boy, and developed a small crush on her. Because of their meeting, Wein knows how to play one song on the ocarina she gave him.

Maximillian Schneider (マクシミリアン・シュナイダー/マックス)

- Age: 18
- Height: 183 cm
- Ring Weapon: Sword

Wein's Friend from the academy. He strongly dislikes war, most likely caused by his father's death and subsequent loss of his mother. After he and Wein graduated into knighthood, he left to become a diplomat and get into politics. He strongly believes that it is possible to eliminate war completely. Max is one of the good characters except when in his final bid for peace, he tries to turn the world into mindless puppets.

Hans Bearnt (ハンス・バート)

- Ring Weapon: Throwing Knives

An orphan with a cheerful, happy-go-lucky attitude who was inspired by Wein and Max to become a powerful fighter. He enrolled in the knight academy and coincidentally became assigned with Wein. He lived in the Starkberg orphanage, but visited Clain Village often and looked up to the chief as a grandfather. He loves to help children and dreams of someday having a loving family of his own. There is a running joke of Hans fighting with Charlone for the silliest reasons.

Charlone Claudius (シャルローネ・クラウディオス)

- Ring Weapon: Bow & Arrow

She is a young daughter of noble standing. Her father, Maxwell Claudius, disapproves of her travelling with Wein as a soldier. She has a strong will, with ambitions of becoming an Imperial Knight, and idolizes Julia Douglas for being the only female Imperial Knight. She has a younger brother Pietro who is ill, but refuses to have an operation unless Charlone becomes an Imperial Knight. She seems to have a tense friendship with Hans, taking an initial disliking to his nicknaming her "CC", yet accepting him calling her "Charlo" (シャロ). During the course of the game she may fall in love with Wein depending on how the player treats her.

Xenos Langley (ゼノス・ラングレー)

- Ring Weapon: Sword

A strong swordsman and former mercenary. When the party looks for Karene, his sister, the party ends up assisting him to find her. After rescuing her, he joins the party to testify to the king of Burnstein that Wein & company were innocent about the destruction of the dam. His hometown is Grandshill, and he was a champion at the arena.

Riviera Marius (リビエラ・マリウス)

- Ring Weapon: Magic Staff

She is a magic user and Shadow Knight of Burnstein, a type of spy. She is secretive and tries to keep distance from people in order to protect herself emotionally, due to an event in her past. She was on a mission with a man named Karl and they had to split up to evade pursuit. Karl promised to meet up again but he died before he could. Riviera was depressed over this while her sister Olivia, who was Karl's lover, was able to accept his death calmly. Riviera could not deal with this kind of pain again and wonders how Olivia can endure it.

Carmaine Fallsmyer (カーマイン・フォルスマイヤー)

- Ring Weapon: Sword

A mysterious swordsman and the main Character in the first Growlanser game. He is ordered by King Eliotte to accompany the player in an important mission. When he was a baby, he was found and taken to the Rolandia court where the Palace Magicians examined him. They saw that he was either a light to save the world or a darkness to destroy it. He was adopted by Sandra, a Palace Magician, who created a homunculus named Tippi to watch over him.

Brett Varner (ウォーマー・ブルース)
A guard in the Space & Time Control Tower. He is a simple and humble man. Even though he would have been allowed to become a knight and have higher status, he chose to stay a guard in the tower because he believes in this role he is helping out people enough. The player can only acquire Brett if they do not recruit Ernest.

Sereb (セレブ)
A magical wolf and the last of his kind (later revealed to be called the Silverfox Tribe). Long ago he was captured by humans for research but was saved by Arieta, becoming her loyal companion and protector. He carries a sword in his mouth.

Ernest Lyell (アーネスト・ライエル)
A former Imperial Knight exiled from Burnstein for supporting an impostor, Richard, to become King. Four years ago Richard recruited Lyell to become an Imperial Knight. Lyell was talented but unguided and Richard believed becoming a Knight would be the best path for him to follow. Since his exile, Lyell has become very cold and quiet and has no interest in the world any more. He is reluctant to join Wein until Wein appeals to him in the same way that Richard once did.

Arieta Lyuis (アリエータ・リュイス)

- Age: 17
- Height: 155 cm
- Ring Weapon: Magic Spheres

The mysterious Growsian girl Wein met in his childhood. Little is known of her past, but saving her is one of Wein's main goals throughout the game. She, like Venzern, is a Growsian born during a full solar eclipse.

Wolfgang (Leonard Cruz) (ウォルフガング)
Leader of the Grandzenschtraum mercenary band and accomplished warrior. The player can discover during the main quest that Wolfgang is in fact Wein's older half-brother Leonard Cruz, and is also the man who murdered Wein's father.

Karene Langley (カレン・ラングレー)
The younger sister of Xenos. She works in the hospital in Grandshill and is an expert on medical herbs. She often goes outside to collect herbs for medicines and writes a book about them. She is also kidnapped several times throughout the game.

Julia Douglas (ジュリア・ダグラス)
An Imperial Knight. In Growlanser, her father had high expectations of her since he had been an Imperial Knight, but when her brother was born, her father shifted all his expectations to his son and ignored her. She felt she had no reason to wield a sword any more, until the heroes convinced her that she should still persevere and fight for what she believes in. She is disguised as a man when the party first meet her.

Wallace (ウォレス)
A former mercenary. He met up with Sandra in the battlefield and the two fell in love. She later gave birth to their child, Louise.

Ariost (アリオスト)
An intelligent student and researcher at the Magic Academy, where he develops technologies. Most of his devices, even though they are successful, get declined from the Magic Academy heads for being possibly too dangerous for the public. He doesn't mind this though, since he does science for his own enjoyment and to try to reach his mother, who is a Featherian. He is very kind and gives the money he receives from his research to the villagers of his hometown.

King Eliotte (エリオット王)
Current ruler of Burnstein Kingdom, and younger brother of late King Richard (リシャール). Early in the game, he attempts to escape the palace incognito, but meets up with Wein and decides to return.

Kenshin Reaves (オスカー・リーヴス)
An Imperial Knight. He had a friendship with Ernest Lyell. His original name was "Oskar Reeves", but Working Designs changed the first name to Kenshin in honor of one of their long-time fans that died of cancer during the development of the English version of the game. The fan's name on the Working Designs message board was Kenshin.

Louise Fallsmyer (ルイセ・フォルスマイヤー)

- Age: 15
- Height: 154 cm

Carmaine's younger sister. She was born during a complete solar eclipse, which makes her potentially a very powerful Growsian, a being who can wield great magic. She is a shy and reserved girl and easily cries.

Misha (ミーシャ)
A clumsy redheaded girl attending the Magic Academy. She is friends with Louise, close enough to be sisters. When she meets Carmaine, she develops a crush on him and calls him onii-sama out of respect. She considers Louise and Carmaine to be her sister and brother.

Sandra Fallsmyer (サンドラ・フォルスマイヤー)
Carmaine's adopted mother. When she was young, she dreamed of being a Palace Magician of Rolandia. She achieved that goal, and eventually there she met a mysterious abandoned baby. She adopted him and named him Carmaine. She raised him herself so that he would not fall to the path of evil. Somewhere along the way she met the mercenary Wallace in the battlefield and fell in love. She gave birth to their child, Louise.

Tippi (ティビ)
A mischievous sprite assumed to be a homunculus, and Carmaine's traveling companion during the first Growlanser game. She apparently has a crush on Carmaine, who would attack him with her patented "Tippi-chan Kick" whenever he acted like a pervert. She does not appear in Growlanser II, but the player can find "Tippi's Diary" at some point in the game.

Logan (ローガン)
Wein's commander during his Academy days. He was friends with Maximillian Schneider's father. He blames himself for Schneider's death and feels he must protect and do anything for Maximillian.

Byron (バイロン)
Wein's commander in the Burnstein Army. He seems to hold a dislike for Wein's squadron in particular, once calling them "postules on my posterior". He was also the one who assigned them to carry out Max's mission of hunting down the Rottenbaum marauders.

Maxwell Claudius (マックスウェル・クラウディオス)
Charlone's aristocrat father, who pushes her to become an Imperial Knight, then later tries to keep her at home. He distrusts Wein being an officer because Wein has no social standing, so he doesn't want his daughter following Wein. He was a Sleeping Lion Knight.

Pietro Claudius (ピエトロ・クラウディオス)
Charlone's younger brother with an illness. He misses his sister when she is away. He refuses to have an operation unless Charlone becomes an Imperial Knight.

Elroy (エルロイ)
Acted as Maximillian's messenger, but was really working for Wolfgang. In his position as messenger he was able to carry out the plot of framing Wein and causing a war between Burnstein and Rolandia.

Patrick (パトリック)
A man who looks exactly like Max, and the real culprit who destroyed Arias Dam.

Lucia (ルーシア)
A catgirl who was captured by a xenobiologist at the Magic Academy. She hated being treated like an animal there and escaped. She held bitter distrust for humans and picked fights with Wein & company with her new monster friends. Through several optional events, Wein may befriend her and even reunite her with her parents. From this, Wein learns that Lucia's father was a human, and her mother was from the cat tribe. Because of this relationship, she and her daughter were cast out of the tribe, and not easily accepted by humans either.

Gevas (ゲーヴァス)
The entity responsible for controlling the bioweapon Gevel (ゲヴェル), which interrupted the war between Burnstein and Rolandia in the first Growlanser. Gevas' soul had been confined to the bodies of the two most powerful Growsians alive at the time: Arieta and Venzern. However, his soul is manifesting in the now-awakened Arieta, and he seeks to revive Gevel.

Venzern (ヴェンツェル)
The Growsian wizard responsible for the plotline of the first Growlanser.

== Battle system ==
Growlanser II utilizes a free-range movement tactical RPG battle system. Unlike grid-based TRPGs, a character's movement range is represented by a circular area in which the character can move anywhere within its confines. A character's movement speed is based on the number of MOV points they have in the game. Growlanser II's combat system is active-time based rather than strictly turn-based. Instead of each side taking its turn in waves, both sides move and act based on individual units' speed stats. Physical attackers must move towards the enemy to connect the blow within its range, while magical attackers must take time to cast their spells, a trade-off for being able to hit targets further away.

Growlanser II does not have as many random encounters as Grownlanser, due to using a point-based world map, but each of the major events in the story have unique battle scenarios. These range from trying to escape from a surrounded encounter without killing too many units, to rescuing a character before attacking, to a simple "defeat all enemies" objective. Reinforcement enemy forces often show up in these scenarios.

Characters can equip two pieces of equipment, one being a Ring Weapon. In the story, a Ring weapon is a new technology where magic rings take the shape of different weapons personalised to the wearer. Players can find these rings after the defeat of an enemy, and can equip different ones for different stats and different gem-equip slots.

Growlanser II features 100 types of equippable gems that cause various beneficial effects. These include adding extra attacks, elemental defenses, increasing range of attacks, or adding spells to the character's repertoire. These gems all have an innate level and that level must match or be lower than the slot available in the Ring weapon to be equipped. Each Ring Weapon only has 3 gem-slots, with a level of 0-9 for each slot to equip the respective level gems.

For example, if Wein equips a Ring Weapon with gem-slots of 9-4-1, then he can equip any gem in the first slot, but he can only equip gems of level 4 or lower in the second slot; and only level 1 gems in the final slot. If a Ring Weapon has a 0 slot, then no gem can be equipped there. Gems range from level 1 through 9.

== Reception ==
On release, Famitsu magazine scored the game a 30 out of 40.
