= Revelations: The Demon Slayer =

1992 video game

- Developers: Access; Multimedia Intelligence Transfer
- Publishers: Atlus; Index
- Producer: Hideyuki Yokoyama
- Designer: Shunichi Ōta
- Programmers: Kazuhito Takahashi, Mieko Omote, Yoshio Hori, Izumi
- Artists: Momi Nakamura, Noriko Ōkubo, Kiyomi Sakai
- Composers: Iwao Mitsunaga, Hiroyuki Yanada
- Series: Megami Tensei Gaiden: Last Bible
- Platforms: Game Boy, Game Gear, Game Boy Color, Nintendo 3DS
- Release: Game Boy: JP: December 25, 1992; Game Gear: JP: April 22, 1994; Game Boy Color: JP: March 19, 1999; USA: August, 1999; Nintendo 3DS: JP: April 25, 2012
- Genre: Role-playing
- Mode: Single-player

Revelations : The Demon Slayer (女神転生外伝 ラストバイブル) is a role-playing video game developed by Access and Multimedia Intelligence Transfer, and published by Atlus, Index and Sega, initially released on Game Boy on December 25, 1992 in Japan under the name ‘'Megami Tensei Gaiden: Last Bible’'. It is the first color RPG for Game Boy Color released in North America.

== Plot ==
Revelations: The Demon Slayer presents a bright, high‑fantasy world that is secretly the distant future ruins of our own world, which makes it a post‑apocalypse story. Distant descendants of humans possess the ability to call upon a power called Gaia. The player takes the role of a young boy, named El, who learns the arts of Gaia. However, the land is in danger - an evil force is approaching. Assisted by his friends, the hero has to summon an army of demons and lead them in a war against the evil.

== Gameplay ==
The battles in Revelations: The Demon Slayer are the typical text-based style. Like in all other Megaten games, the player can summon demons (up to 100), and fuse them, getting more powerful variants. The player can acquire demons via a question system. Unlike other Megaten games, demons cannot level up.

In addition to aiding the player's characters in the game, demons can be pit against a friend's team in the Pokémon-style Game Link mode. Some spells are available.

== Reception ==
The game received a 25/40 rating from Famitsu. It also received a 7.2 rating on GameSpot.
