= Career Soft =

Video game development studio

- Native name: 株式会社キャリアソフト
- Romanized name: Kabushiki gaisha Kyaria Sofuto
- Formerly: Team Career
- Type: Kabushiki gaisha Subsidiary
- Industry: Video games
- Genre: Tactical role-playing
- Founded: June 1996
- Defunct: September 5, 2013
- Fate: Folded into Sega Dream Corporation
- Headquarters: Japan
- Key people: Shinjiro Takada; Yoh Haduki
- Products: Langrisser series; Growlanser series
- Parent: Atlus (2001-2010); Index Corporation (2010-2013)

Career Soft (Japanese: 株式会社キャリアソフト, Hepburn: Kabushiki gaisha Kyaria Sofuto) was a Japanese video game development studio founded in June 1996 by Team Career, a team within the Masaya Games, which was formed to develop Langrisser and Langrisser II. Career Soft continued to work with Masaya Games for the development of Langrisser III, Langrisser IV and Langrisser V.

In October 2001, Atlus acquired Career Soft and became the sole publisher of their games. As a subsidiary to Atlus, Career Soft was in charge of develop the spiritual successor to the Langrisser franchise, Growlanser. In 2004, after the release of Growlanser IV, the majority of Career Soft's staff was merged into the main development team of Atlus, where they have worked on the Shin Megami Tensei sub-series Devil Survivor. Career Soft continued to exist as a label after Index Holdings dissolved Atlus into its video game business in October 2010.

On 5 September 2013, as a brand, Career Soft was dissolved once Sega acquired Index Corporation and transferred all the target company's assets into Sega Dream Corporation. On the 18 February 2014, the assets of Career Soft were transferred to the video game development division of Sega Dream Corporation which was re-branded as Atlus.

== Games ==
Year	Title	Platform(s)
Elthlead
1987	Elthlead	PC-8801, MSX2
1987	Gaia no Monshou	PC-8801; 1988: PC Engine
1987	Gaiflame	PC-8801; 1990: PC Engine
Langrisser
1991	Langrisser / Warsong	Mega Drive; 1993: PC Engine; 1997: PlayStation; 1998: Sega Saturn, Windows
1994	Langrisser II	Mega Drive
1995	Der Langrisser	Super Famicom, 1996: PC-FX; 1997: PlayStation; 1998: Sega Saturn, Windows
1996	Langrisser III	Sega Saturn; 1998: Windows; 2005: PlayStation 2
1997	Langrisser IV	Sega Saturn, 1999: PlayStation
1998	Langrisser V: The End of Legend	Sega Saturn, 1999: PlayStation
Growlanser
1999	Growlanser	PlayStation; 2001: Windows; 2003: PlayStation 2
2001	Growlanser II: The Sense of Justice	PlayStation 2
2001	Growlanser III: The Dual Darkness	PlayStation 2
2003	Growlanser IV: Wayfarer of the Time	PlayStation 2
2005	Growlanser IV: Wayfarer of the Time - Return	PlayStation 2
2006	Growlanser V: Generations / Growlanser: Heritage of War	PlayStation 2
2007	Growlanser VI: Precarious World	PlayStation 2
2009	Growlanser (remake)	PlayStation Portable
2011	Growlanser IV: Over Reloaded / Growlanser: Wayfarer of Time	PlayStation Portable
Other games
1992	Macross: Eternal Love Song	PC Engine
