= Growlanser: Wayfarer of Time =

2003 video game

- Front box art of the North American release
- Developer: Career Soft
- Publisher: Atlus
- Directors: Shinjiro Takada; Taiji Hida
- Designer: Fuma Yato
- Artist: Satoshi Urushihara
- Composer: Tomoyuki Hamada
- Series: Growlanser
- Platforms: PlayStation 2, PlayStation Portable
- Release: PlayStation 2: JP: December 18, 2003; PlayStation Portable: JP: August 18, 2011; NA: July 31, 2012
- Genre: Tactical role-playing
- Mode: Single-player

Growlanser: Wayfarer of Time (Note: GROW LANSER IV -Wayfarer of the time- in Japan) is a tactical role-playing game developed by Career Soft and published by Atlus. It was originally released for the PlayStation 2 in Japan in December 2003, and later for the PlayStation Portable in Japan in August 2011 (as Growlanser IV: Over Reloaded) and in North America in July 2012. It is the fourth installment in the Growlanser series, with character designs by Satoshi Urushihara. A visual novel fan-disc, Growlanser IV: Wayfarer of Time - Return, containing three short stories, was released on PS2 in 2005.

== Gameplay ==
Wayfarer of Time features an isometric perspective and a "traditional RPG" style exploration in towns, dungeons and the world map that are very similar to the original Growlanser. Enemies can be seen on the world map and can also be avoided. Each dungeon has a unique, fixed layout (with the exception of the "bonus dungeon", which is randomly generated).

The equipment system is markedly different from most RPGs. Characters can equip two pieces of armor, one being a "Ring Weapon". In the Growlanser series, a Ring Weapon is a new technology where magic rings transform into different weapons depending on the user's personality. Players find these rings often after defeating enemies and can equip different rings for different stat bonuses and different gem-equip slots. There are over 100 types of gems that cause various beneficial effects such as granting extra attacks, more elemental defenses, increasing range or adding spells to the character's repertoire. These gems all have an innate level and that level must match or be lower than the slot available in the Ring weapon to be equipped. Each Ring Weapon only has three gem slots with a level of 0-9 for each slot to equip the respective level gems. Additionally, a gem's color must match the color of a ring slot. A gem can be equipped into any given slot, but penalties are incurred if the gem has a skill that can be learned.

There are 11 potential playable characters, but there is a four-member party limit in battles. The fate system allow players to save some characters from death based on their decisions and ultimately unlock additional endings.

=== Relationship system ===
Like other games in the Growlanser series, Wayfarer of Time features some dating sim elements. The player can improve or damage the protagonist's relationship with others based on the conversation options chosen and what decisions they make in the game. A character's portrait in the status menu reflects the state of their relationship with the player character; the happier they look, the better their relationship. Also, the familiars have the ability to see the party members' opinions of the protagonist. Wayfarer of Time features a new vacation system where players spend time with their party members to form close friendships or pursue romances. Completing a character's backstory quest will unlock features such as ultimate armors, skills and one of the 40 possible endings.

=== Combat ===
Screenshot of a battle in Growlanser: Wayfarer of Time

Like its predecessors, Growlanser: Wayfarer of Time utilizes a free-range movement tactical RPG battle system. Unlike grid-based TRPGs, a character's movement range is represented by a circular area in which the character can move anywhere within its confines. In addition, movement speed is based on the number of MOV points a character has in the game. Another aspect of Growlanser's system is that it is active time-based rather than strictly turn-based. Instead of each side taking its turn in waves, both sides move and act based on individual unit's speed stats. Physical attackers must move towards the enemy to connect the blow within its range while magical attackers must take the time to chant their spells in exchange for being able to hit much further ranges. Since characters' actions play out in real-time, a player can interrupt an action at any moment to perform a new action.

The Growlanser series features cooperation magic, in which two members of the party can cast stronger support or offensive spells (e.g. Co-op Heal or Co-op Sleep). In Wayfarer of Time, the player's party can only cast area of effect spells through use of cooperation magic. Some enemy bosses are capable of casting AoE spells on their own. Wayfarer of time features "limit abilities" that characters may activate that vary from powerful attacks to extremely useful support magic depending on the circumstances.

Major events in the story have unique battle objectives, such as the ability to rescue an NPC from enemies rather than simply 'defeat all enemies'. Reinforcement enemy forces sometimes show up in battle, making it prudent to plan a strategy, rather than rushing blindly into battle. There are a wide array of mission goals that vary from the normal "defeat all enemies" such as: escape the battle without killing anyone, protect the NPCs, search out areas where enemies are trying to ambush the player, don't let the enemy escape, set fire to different points on the enemy camp, and more. If the entire party dies it is Game Over, but if the player survives a battle, they can achieve four outcomes: Mission Failed, Mission Passed, Mission Clear, and Mission Complete, all of which make it possible to continue the game and may unlock an alternate story branch.

== Synopsis ==
=== Setting ===
Wayfarer of Time takes place on a continent called Noievarl, which is divided into four countries bearing similarity to medieval Europe. The countries have become increasingly hostile towards their neighbours and are now in the midst of war. South of the mainland is Lamplast Island, where the Arten Schwart mercenaries are stationed to defend Noievarl from foreign invaders.

=== Story ===
2000 years ago, the people of Noievarl progressed in magic and science, and built a highly advanced civilization. Then powerful Angels attacked the humans, and brought them to the brink of extinction. A young man named Crevanille, who was raised as a mercenary at Arten Schwart, witnesses a seraph in the sky. Knowing it is a sign that the angels are returning to oppress humanity, he sets out to battle the angels for the sake of the world. Crevanille must discover how to defeat the angels and save the fate of humanity. He will become a new Savior of Light: the Growlanser.

=== Multiple endings ===
Growlanser: Wayfarer of Time has been stated by Atlus to have over 40 possible endings. The PSP version has three possible story branches that the player may choose from which will lead to a different outcome of the main storyline. Additionally, the player can unlock a unique epilogue for each of the playable characters, as well as most of the NPC allies, if the protagonist romances or becomes best friends with the character and completes his or her sidequest. It is possible to achieve multiple endings in one playthrough (by reloading saved games), but requires a minimum of four playthroughs to achieve every possible ending.

== Development ==
Growlanser IV: Wayfarer of Time was originally developed by Career Soft in 2003. The game was directed by Shinjiro Takada, who also worked on Shin Megami Tensei: Devil Survivor. The main scenario writers were Fuma Yato and Yo Haduki, who were also lead writers for Devil Survivor. The original soundtrack was composed by Tomoyuki Hamada, with new opening and ending tracks for the PSP version composed by Ryota Kozuka.

== Reception ==
Growlanser: Wayfarer of Time received "mixed or average reviews" with a score of 67/100 based on 14 reviews.
