= Langrisser Re:Incarnation Tensei =

2015 video game

- Developer: Masaya Games
- Publishers: JP: Extreme Games; WW: Aksys Games
- Composer: Noriyuki Iwadare
- Series: Langrisser
- Platform: Nintendo 3DS
- Release: JP: July 23, 2015; NA/EU: April 19, 2016
- Genre: Tactical role-playing game
- Mode: Single-player

Langrisser Re:Incarnation Tensei (Note: Japanese: ラングリッサー リインカーネーション －転生－) is a 2015 video game in the Langrisser series.

The game takes place in a flooded world and the story's protagonist is a man with the Sacred Sword Langrisser, looking to reunite himself with a childhood friend, while fighting the empire's army. The battle system is the same as known from other Langrisser titles, but with 10-on-10 battles fought by 3D characters serving as units. The units consist of Infantry, Cavalry, and Archers.

== Music ==
The game's music has been written by series regular Noriyuki Iwadare. Okui Masami sung the theme song "Blood Blade: Beyond the Light and Darkness" (Blood Blade -光と闇の彼方に-).

== Reception ==
Reception

Aggregate score
Aggregator	Score
Metacritic	35/100

Re:Incarnation Tensei launched in Japan with 9,300 physical copies sold.
