= Langrisser IV =

1997 video game

- Developer: Career Soft
- Publisher: Masaya
- Series: Langrisser
- Platforms: Sega Saturn, PlayStation, PlayStation Network
- Release: Sega Saturn: JP: August 1, 1997; PlayStation: JP: January 28, 1999; PlayStation Network: JP: November 25, 2009
- Genre: Tactical role-playing game
- Mode: Single-player

PlayStation screenshot of Langrisser IV - fan translation in English

Sega Saturn screenshot of Langrisser IV - battle

Sega Saturn screenshot of Langrisser IV - overhead

Langrisser IV is a tactical role-playing game developed by Career Soft and released by Masaya Games for the Sega Saturn on August 1, 1997. It was later ported to the PlayStation on January 28, 1999. Langrisser IV is the sequel to Langrisser III, which has never been released outside Japan. There is a fan-translated English patch available for the PlayStation version.

== Development ==
Development on Langrisser IV began in October 1996 and ended on June 8, 1997, according to the in-game development diary.

== Story ==
The story in Langrisser IV takes place 200 years after Langrisser II.

Two hundred years after Erwin has defeated Böser and sealed the two swords, Alhazard and Langrisser, in the Sage's Crystal, most people have forgotten about the legend and El Sallia has returned to its usual pattern of inter-kingdom feuding. In the western land of Yeless, a new darkness has begun.

An aged wizard, Gizlof, whose two main goals in life, immortality and world domination, already has the wheels of his great scheme in motion. Through a pact with the dark god, Gendrasil, and the knowledge obtained, he begins construction of a new piloted Guyframe unit as well as experiments on clones and modified humans. Before his ambitions can be realized, he needs a great magical source, the Sage's Crystal, which is housed in Gotahl Village where three adopted siblings of the Village Elder, Randius, Ricky and Rachel, are living a happy small-town life.

Unable to randomly attack a small defenseless town as a high-ranking government official, Gizlof devises an evil plan to double the tax on the village. Left with no options, the villagers decide to revolt and fall right into Gizlof's trap. Gizlof arrives with his army using the rebellion as an excuse to take the Sage's Crystal and wipe out the villagers. Next to the Sage's Crystal, he notices Rachel's great magical capability and decides to kidnap her for his experiments. Gizlof teleports away with the crystal and Rachel while leaving his army to finish the massacre.

Powerless to save their sister or father, Ricky and Randius flee the village and go on a journey to save their kidnapped sister from Gizlof's mansion. The journey leads them straight into a federation attack on the princesses and commodore of the Caconsis Kingdom, a half-cyborg man, as well as a sage named Jessica and "The Mysterious Mage, Faelart".

The fate of this tale all depends on the choices Randius makes in his campaign which can lead him down three different paths: Light (A), Chaos (B), or Independence (C).

== Playable characters ==
- Randius: The adopted son of the Elder of Gotahl Village and the hero of the story. After Gizlof's attack on the village, Randius vows to put an end to Gizlof's ambitions of world domination. His actions will affect the future of the continent: for Light, Chaos, or for Independence. His character class growth is dependent on how the player answers the questionnaire at the start of the game. Voiced by: Ryōtarō Okiayu.
- Ricky: Randius' foster brother and the true blood descendant of Gotahl's Village Elder. Like his adopted kin, he vows revenge against Gizlof. A ladies' man who is a big flirt with the female characters, his heart lies with the Princess Shelfaniel of Caconsis Kingdom. He has the potential to be a sea commander, land commander or magic commander. He is available on all paths, and a potential antagonist on the Chaos path. Voiced by: Hideo Ishikawa.
- Rachel: Foster sister of Randius, the adopted daughter of the Village Elder and also Randius' potential love interest. Rachel is captured by Gizlof immediately after he takes the Sage Crystal. After Randius rescues her, Rachel joins the party. Her next departure is decided on the actions of her brother Randius, as well as her fate. She has class potential for healing, summoning and attack spells. She departs during the Light and Independent paths and becomes an ally in the end of the Chaos path. She is a major antagonist in the Chaos and Independent stories, where she is further brainwashed by Gizlof. Voiced by: Yuko Sumitomo.
- McClaine: A wandering cyborg with a grudge against Gizlof for his evil experiments and for the death of his sister Mary. McClaine joins Randius after supporting him against a Federation ambush in the second scenario of the game. He is a battle veteran who advises Randius during battle situations. He has a tumultuous, somewhat comical relationship with Ricky. He has the potential for sea and land fighting classes. He is also available on all paths. Voiced by: Hiroshi Kamiya.
- Shelfaniel: One of the twin princesses of the Caconsis Kingdom. She was sent to the Federation as part of a peace treaty over the death of her brother. She is rescued by Randius and becomes his ally for the majority of the game. She is a quiet, gentle counterpart to her younger sister and a potential love interest and enemy for both Randius and Ricky. She is generally a magic-type user. She is available as an ally on the Light and Independent paths and an antagonist on the Chaos and Independent paths. Voiced by: Junko Iwao.
- Angelina: One of the twin princesses of the Caconsis Kingdom. She was sent to the Federation as part of a peace treaty over the death of her brother. She is rescued by Randius and becomes his ally for the majority of the game. She is a fierce tomboy counterpart to her sister Shelfaniel and a potential love interest for Randius. She has potential for air and horse classes. She is available as an ally on the Light and Independent paths and an antagonist on the Chaos path. Voiced by: Houko Kuwashima.
- Serena: A general of the Caconsis Kingdom and right-hand to Commodore Wiler, whom she has romantic feelings for. She is a battle hardened veteran with the potential for holy magic. She is a playable character on the Light path and an antagonist on the Chaos and Independent path. She is a potential love interest to Randius. Voiced by: Yōko Asada.
- Lanford: A famous young general of the Regenburg Federation. Born in aristocracy, he is a kind meritocratic leader who treats the lower class soldiers and officers like equals. Like Lance and Leon from past Langrisser games, he is a rival to the main character. He has potential for horse, air and ground class types. He is an ally in the Light and Independent paths and a major antagonist in the normal, Independent and Chaos paths. Voiced by: Kunihiko Yasui.
- Jessica: The immortal avatar of the Goddess Lushris who appears in every Langrisser installment. She is also localised as "Calais" in Warsong. Jessica conspires in the politics of the Yeless Continent to reclaim the Sage Crystal and protect the world from darkness. She is a playable character in the Light path and an antagonist in the Chaos path. She is generally a holy magic user. Voiced by: Ai Maeda.
- Listell: A demon general of Böser, the Prince of Darkness, and a love interest for Randius. She works with her master to reclaim Alhazard and take over the world. In a certain path, however, she changes her ways after meeting Randius and works with him to create a peaceful world with humans and demons coexisting. She has the potential for demon-type classes. She is an ally in the Chaos and Independent paths, and an antagonist in the Light path. Voiced by: Yukiko Manaka.
- Null: A taciturn demon general of Böser. Null works under Listell in all of the story paths. He seems to have feelings for her. He has the potential for demon-type classes. He is an antagonist in the Light path, and an ally in the Chaos and Independent paths. Voiced by: Jin Domon.
- Ivar: A mercenary who is allegedly a genius strategist in warfare. In reality, he is nothing more than a conman. His allegiance varies in the story, but he finally places his faith on Böser to save the world. He is only playable in the Chaos path, and is an antagonist on other paths. He is the only character with no hidden fifth classes in the game.

== Non-playable characters ==
- Gizlof: The main antagonist of Langrisser IV. He is an avaricious old wizard who seeks immortality and world conquest. He manipulates the Regenburg Federation and his benefactor, the Dark God Gendrasil, to achieve his selfish dreams. At 17, he was conscripted in the military of his home country in a war against the Federation. With magical potential albeit unrefined, Gizlof cursed his fate for his poverty and the loss of his parents. It was at that time he came to learn of the secrets of ancient technology and magic from his mentor, the Devil known as Gendrasil, who is a bitter rival of Chaos. His fate is sealed in all of the three paths by Landius, despite wielding the evil sword Alhazard in the Independent Path, which is canon. He posthumously influences the events in Langrisser V, which takes place during and after the Independent Path. Voiced by: Hidekatsu Shibata.
- Böser: One of the primary antagonists of the Langrisser series and its spin-offs. He is also localised as "Ganelon" in Warsong. In Langrisser III, he was Paul, Altemuller's cousin. He is the Prince of Darkness who takes part in the war as "Fealart" on the Yeless Continent to resurrect his master Chaos and destroy the world. In Langrisser IV, he is one of the secondary antagonists to Gizlof. If Landius swears allegiance to Böser, he becomes a supporting character in the Chaos path. Canonically, he is destroyed for good as Chaos' avatar in the Independent Path. Voiced by: Kaneto Shiozawa.
- Chaos: The God of Darkness himself and the ultimate villain in the Langrisser series and its spin-offs: Guyframe, Ethlead and Crest of Gaia. Chaos' purpose is to bring about chaos and anarchy in order to save the world from established order, which is stagnating it. His resurrection is tied to the unholy sword Alhazard. He is a secondary antagonist to Gizlof in Langrisser IV. He is a supporting ally in the Chaos path and the archenemy of the Goddess Lushiris, his polar opposite. His fate is canonically sealed by Landius wielding Langrisser in the Independent Path. Voiced by: Masaharu Satō.
- Kreuger: The sorcerer Kreuger is the son of Gizlof and a major antagonist of Langrisser IV. He is very devoted to his father's dreams to prove his love for him, despite the fact that his father sees him as nothing more than a disposable pawn. In reality, however, he is revealed to be a clone experiment created from Gizlof's cells. Depending on the path, he becomes a devoted subordinate or an enemy to his father. His true fate is sealed after his body becomes completely corrupted by Gendrasil's spirit in the Independent Path. Voiced by: Masaya Takatsuka.
- Gendrasil: A sealed demon who achieved godhood from dead souls of ancient wars. He manipulates Gizlof with promises of power and conquest in order to overthrow Chaos and rule all over demonkind and the world. He also stole the Sage Crystal from heaven, which lead to the events of Langrisser IV. In certain story paths, he manipulates Kreuger for his own ends. He is the final antagonist in the Chaos path. His true fate is sealed after Gizlof defeats him and absorbs his power in the Independent Path. Voiced by: Tetsu Inada.
- Wiler: The head of the forces of Caconsis. His talent lies in strategy, not in combat. He was a colleague of Lanford during their academy days. He is a supporting character of Landius and an antagonist in the Chaos path. Voiced by: Kenji Nojima.
- Emily: General Lanford's adjutant and Landius' sister. She was adopted after her family was killed in a flood. She worked her way into the Federation Military despite her common origins. She has strong feelings for Lanford and an important connection with the hero Landius. In the Independent Path, she becomes possessed by Graaz and is ultimately united with her lost little brother, Landius.
- Valk: One of the Federation's greatest generals. Born of common origins, he has a grudge against the nobility, which changes during his relationship with Lanford. Canonically, he is killed by the Caconsis Army led by Landius in the Independent Path. He is a minor antagonist in the story.
- High King Cleoness: The High King of the Federation. He is brainwashed by Gizlof in order to enact a war against Caconsis and to secure the throne for his son Kreuger.
- Prince Fredrick: The son of Cleoness. He distrusts Gizlof and Kreuger. He becomes a rival to Gizlof for succession of the throne. His fate is dependent on the path the player takes. Canonically, he is murdered by the Prime Minister, who is possessed by Graaz.
- Princess Rozenciel: The daughter of Cleoness. Originally engaged to General Aldan, thanks to Gizlof's machinations, she is wed to his son Kreuger, who becomes king. After her brother's death, she becomes the Federation's Queen in Langrisser V.
- Duke Aldan: Aldan is one of the Federation generals. Born from nobility, he has little respect for the common people. He was meant to be wed to his fiancée Rozenciel. His fate is sealed in a battle against Caconsis to redeem his honour, thanks to Gizlof's schemes. He is a minor antagonist.
- Prime Minister: He conspires against Gizlof with the help from demons. He later becomes an ally of Frederick.
- Russell: The Prime Minister's son and his collaborator. He conspires against Gizlof for succession of the throne.
- King Caconsis: The incompetent ruler of Caconsis. He is the father of Shelfaniel and Angelina.
- Queen Caconsis: The wife of King Caconsis and the loving mother of Shelfaniel and Angelina.
- Bruno: General of Caconsis Kingdom. He is an ally of Gizlof due to Graaz possessing his body. Canonically, he shows remorse to the Caconsis Princesses, despite not being blamed as being controlled by Graaz, for the death of their father before he is killed in battle.
- Graaz: Gendrasil's right-hand in the service of Gizlof. He has the ability to possess the bodies of people. He is behind the possessions of the bodies of Bruno, the Prime Minister and Emily. Canonically, he is killed by Landius after Langrisser exorcises him from Emily's body in the Independent Path.
- Village Elder: The adoptive father of Landius and Rachel, Ricky's biological father and the head of Gotahl Village. He sacrifices himself to save his sons Landius and Ricky from the invading Federation troops.
- Belgar: Loyal adjutant to General Valk. He assists Valk in his battles against Caconsis forces. He sacrifices his life in Scenario 12 to ensure Valk's safety.
- Reese: The mage commander in charge of the security of Gizlof's estate. Her fate is sealed in Scenario 4 where she fails in escaping with Rachel.
- Bula: The commander in Gizlof's employ. Fought in the first and second scenario. He appears again when the player fails certain scenarios in the game.
- Admiral Rivaas: Supreme commander of the Federation forces. He is framed by Gizlof as a conspirator with Caconsis Kingdom against the Federation. His fate is sealed by Gizlof himself. Gizlof takes over as his successor.
- Alex: The son of Rivaas. Suspecting Gizlof of murdering his father, he revolts against the Federation. He commits suicide to ensure peace and entreats Lanford to expose Gizlof's treachery.
- Sieghart: The ancient hero and ruler of Ethlead is the spirit inside Langrisser. Lewin, Redin and Elwin are some of his direct descendants. Although he does not directly appear in Langrisser IV, he is responsible for selecting Landius as a candidate to wield Langrisser for having the purest of hearts.
- Lushiris: The Goddess of Light who watches over the world of the Langrisser series with her human half, the avatar Jessica. She embodies order and is the archenemy of Chaos, who is her polar opposite.
- Guyframe: A bipedal robot designed by Gizlof from his laboratory research to create the ultimate weapon. It appears as a powerful enemy unit in all three scenarios. It is canonically piloted by the brainwashed Rachel in the Independent path. It is rendered immobile by the defeat of Gizlof, the wielder of Alhazard.

== Music ==
The music in Langrisser IV was composed by Noriyuki Iwadare, Makoto Asai and Yuichiro Honda.

== Reception ==
German magazine MAN!AC reviewed the Japanese Sega Saturn version of Langrisser IV, awarding it 81%. The review praised the game's strategic depth and tactical combat while noting limitations in its presentation.
