= Megami Tensei Gaiden: Last Bible =

Video game series

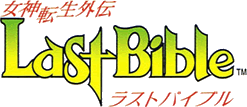
- Japanese logo
- Genre(s): Role-playing
- Developer(s): Multimedia Intelligence Transfer, Sega, Menue
- Publisher(s): Atlus, Sega
- Composer(s): Hiroyuki Yanada; Iwao Mitsunaga; Manami Matsumae
- Platform(s): Game Boy, Game Boy Color, Game Gear, Super Famicom, mobile phones
- First release: Revelations: The Demon Slayer; December 23, 1992
- Latest release: Megami Tensei Gaiden: Last Bible New Testament III; September 17, 2010
- Parent series: Megami Tensei

Megami Tensei Gaiden: Last Bible (Note: Megami Tensei Gaiden: Last Bible (女神転生外伝 Last Bible, lit. Goddess Reincarnation Side-Story: Last Bible)) is a role-playing video game series developed by Multimedia Intelligence Transfer, Sega, and Menue, and published by Atlus and Sega for multiple platforms. The first game of the series, Revelations: The Demon Slayer, was released in 1992; this is the only title in the series to have been released in English. After The Demon Slayer, two sequels and five spin-off titles have been released. In the main series titles, players explore the game world and fight monsters in menu-based battles; players can also attempt to recruit monsters to their party, and can fuse two allied monsters into a single new one to try to get stronger monsters. The spin-off title Another Bible is a turn-based strategy game, while Last Bible Special is a role-playing game controlled from a first-person perspective.

The series is part of the media franchise Megami Tensei, but as Last Bible was developed for a wider audience, including children, the series is toned down compared to Shin Megami Tensei. For instance, players meet monsters rather than demons, and most of the Last Bible titles take place in a medieval fantasy world. The music for the first two games was composed by Hiroyuki Yanada and Iwao Mitsunaga, while Yanada composed the music for Last Bible III on his own, and Manami Matsumae composed the music for Another Bible. Critics have been mostly positive to the series, but the games' graphics have received mixed responses. The music, particularly that of the first two games, has been positively received. Several music albums with the games' soundtracks have been released by Sweep Records.

== Games ==
Original release years
1992	Revelations: The Demon Slayer
1993	Megami Tensei Gaiden: Last Bible II
1994
1995	Last Bible III
1995	Another Bible
1995	Megami Tensei Gaiden: Last Bible Special
1996
1997
1998
1999
2000
2001
2002
2003
2004
2005
2006
2007
2008	Megami Tensei Gaiden: Last Bible New Testament
2009	Megami Tensei Gaiden: Last Bible New Testament II
2010	Megami Tensei Gaiden: Last Bible New Testament III

- Revelations: The Demon Slayer, originally developed in Japan as Megami Tensei Gaiden: Last Bible, is the first game in the series. It was released for Game Boy on December 23, 1992 in Japan, for Game Gear on April 22, 1994 in Japan, and for Game Boy Color on March 19, 1999 in Japan and in August 1999 in North America. The game follows El, a boy who studies magic with his teacher Zodia.
- Megami Tensei Gaiden: Last Bible II is the second game in the series. It was released for Game Boy on November 19, 1993, and for Game Boy Color on April 16, 1999. The game follows Yuri, a boy who was raised by monsters.
- Last Bible III is the third numbered game in the series. It was released for Super Famicom on March 4, 1995. The game follows Ciel, a boy who leaves his home town to travel to go on a journey.
- Another Bible is a spin-off game. It was released for Game Boy on March 4, 1995, and for mobile phones on June 18, 2009. The game follows Rashiel, a boy who saves a girl from bandits and goes on adventures with her.
- Megami Tensei Gaiden: Last Bible Special is the fifth game in the series. It was released for Game Gear on March 24, 1995. The game takes place during biblical times, and follows a hero named Mahtel.
- Megami Tensei Gaiden: Last Bible New Testament is a series of mobile games released in Japan in three installments on September 10, 2007, August 18, 2008, and September 17, 2010.

== Gameplay ==
A conversation with a monster during a battle in Revelations: The Demon Slayer

Revelations: The Demon Slayer, Last Bible II, and Last Bible III are role-playing video games which all have similar gameplay. Players explore the game world and fight various types of monsters. During battles, players choose commands for their characters to do from a menu. Players can attack with both physical attacks and magic spells; different kinds of magic are effective against different types of monsters. Characters in players' party learn new spells throughout the course of the game. By defeating monsters, players gain experience points and money. As characters gain more experience points, players get access to points which he or she can add to the characters' attributes; for instance, players can add points to a character's speed attribute, which allows that character to move earlier during battles. Players can use money that they've earned through battles to buy armor, weapons, and items, in shops found throughout the game world.

Players can choose to talk to monsters instead of fighting them, in order to attempt to recruit them to their party. They can choose which of their characters they want to use to recruit monsters; the different characters vary in how easily they can recruit monsters. Players can also choose from their allied monsters when deciding which character they should use to recruit monsters. Players can use a type of magic called "Combine" to fuse two allied monsters into a single new monster; by doing this, players can get access to stronger monsters. In Last Bible II, players can increase the strength of their allied monsters by giving them accessories. In Last Bible III, players have access to a gauge that shows how the answers they give during conversations affect the monsters. The Demon Slayer includes an unlockable multiplayer mode in which two players can let their respective parties fight each other.

Another Bible is a turn-based strategy game in which players move their characters on tiles and fight enemies. The gameplay loops through three types of segments: preparation for battles, battles, and towns. During the preparation segments, players choose which characters they want to send out, and during the town segments, players buy and sell items and collect information that is required for getting to the next area. Similarly to the numbered Last Bible titles, players can recruit and fuse monsters in Another Bible. Last Bible Special is a role-playing game that is controlled from a first person perspective, and in which players aim to travel through four dungeons.

== Development ==
Last Bible is part of the Megami Tensei media franchise; however, it was made for a wider audience, including children, and is toned down compared to the Shin Megami Tensei games. For instance, players meet monsters rather than demons, and the games take place in a medieval fantasy world. Several companies have been involved in the production of the series: the numbered titles were developed by Multimedia Intelligence Transfer; the Game Gear version of Revelations: The Demon Slayer was developed by Sega; and the mobile "New Testament" phone entries and Another Bible were developed by Menue. (Note: Prior to August 1, 2010, Menue was named Bbmf.) Atlus published all the games except Last Bible Special and the Game Gear version of The Demon Slayer, which were published by Sega. Atlus also localized and published the Game Boy Color version of The Demon Slayer in the US; this is the only game in the series that has been officially released in English, although fan translations of some of the games have been released. Both of the Game Gear Last Bible games are planned to be included on the red variant of the microconsole Game Gear Micro, which was released on October 6, 2020 in Japan.

The music in The Demon Slayer and Last Bible II was composed by Hiroyuki Yanada and Iwao Mitsunaga, and includes progressive rock music. Yanada also composed the music in Last Bible III, but without Mitsunaga; the music in it includes examples of bossa nova. The music in Another Bible was composed by Manami Matsumae. Sweep Records has published albums several of the games' soundtracks as part of their Discovery series, in which they release soundtrack albums for game music that had previously not been released on an album. The album Megami Tensei Gaiden: Last Bible Soundtrack was released on September 15, 2010; Megami Tensei Gaiden: Last Bible II Soundtrack was released on October 7, 2010; Megami Tensei Gaiden: Another Bible Soundtrack was released on January 19, 2011; and Last Bible III Soundtrack was released on October 5, 2011.

== Reception ==
Famitsu review scores
Game	Famitsu
Revelations: The Demon Slayer	25/40
Megami Tensei Gaiden: Last Bible II	23/40
Last Bible III	29/40
Another Bible	24/40
Megami Tensei Gaiden: Last Bible Special	–

Adam Cleveland at IGN called Revelations: The Demon Slayer a fun but not innovative game. The American game magazine Nintendo Power did however find it innovative; for instance, they cited the automatic battle option. Cleveland disliked the monster conversation system, which he found irritating; he said that players never know what answer they should give a monster, and that the questions the monsters ask feel monotone due to how often they are repeated. Writers for the Japanese game magazine Famitsu thought the monster fusion system was fun. In their review of Last Bible III, they commented on how different the game is from the Megami Tensei series, and instead compared it to Final Fantasy. Kurt Kalata and Christopher J. Snelgrove wrote for Hardcore Gaming 101 that while The Demon Slayer was not by any means an outstanding game, it was one of few competent role-playing games on Game Boy. They found Last Bible III to be the best game in the series.

Cleveland liked the graphics in the Game Boy Color version of The Demon Slayer, and said that it reminded him of the "8-bit wonders of years ago". Nintendo Power said that the graphics in the Game Boy Color version looked good, but that they lack the richness of most new games on the system. They disliked the backgrounds, which they called "very bland". Famitsu thought the graphics in Last Bible III were good, but that the graphics in Another Bible looked cheap. Kalata and Snelgrove called the color palette in the Game Boy Color versions of the first two games awful, but said that the Game Gear version of the first game looked much better, and that it was very nice for a handheld game; they specifically pointed out its cinematic sequences, which they called impressive. They thought the character designs in Another Bible were "overly adorable", and said that there are graphical issues in the game when players move. They appreciated the backgrounds in Last Bible Special, and commented that some monster designs in Last Bible III were strange.

Nintendo Power called the music in The Demon Slayer surprisingly good. Cleveland also liked it, and said that it always fits in with all the situations it is played in. Kalata and Snelgrove called it catchy. Don at Square Enix Music Online said that The Demon Slayer has a solid soundtrack for a Game Boy role-playing game, and specifically highlighted "Opening" as a well-composed piece, with its "exotic and mysterious" atmosphere. Patrick Gann at RPGFan said that The Demon Slayer has fantastic and under-appreciated music, but that the soundtrack is short. Don found the soundtrack of Last Bible II to be better than the first game's, and said that several pieces, including "Temple", "Field", "Boss Battle", and "Dungeon", were better than their counterparts in the first game. He said that "Gaia", the piece that is played during the final boss battle, probably was the best of all pieces in the first two games. Gann did also find Last Bible II's music to be better than the first game's. He liked that the soundtrack was longer than the first game's, and how he could not find any melodies that had been "borrowed" from The Demon Slayer's soundtrack. Gann found Last Bible III's sound font to be weak, but liked several of the compositions. Both Don and Gann thought that Another Bible's music was worse than the music in previous games in the series. Don did however appreciate several pieces, including "Beginning Moment", which he thought was catchy and had a fantastic melody, and "Hiding All Feeling Inside", which he found to be the most successful piece in the game's soundtrack.
