= Langrisser III =

1996 video game

- Developers: Career Soft; X-Nauts (PS2)
- Publishers: Masaya Games; Taito (PS2)
- Series: Langrisser
- Platforms: Saturn; PlayStation 2
- Release: Saturn: JP: October 18, 1996; PlayStation 2: JP: October 27, 2005
- Genre: Tactical role-playing
- Mode: Single-player

Langrisser III is a tactical role-playing game developed by Career Soft and released by Masaya Games for the Sega Saturn. A version of the game was developed by X-Nauts and released by Taito for the PlayStation 2. The sequel to Langrisser II, it was released in a number of Asian countries but not in the West. It is the first 32-bit installment in the series. Despite never receiving an official Western localization, Langrisser III received a complete, fan-developed English translation patch for the Sega Saturn in 2026, making the game fully playable in English for the first time.

Langrisser III introduced a non-linear relationship system similar to dating sims. Depending on the player's choices and actions, the feelings of the female allies will change towards the player character, who will end up with the female ally he is closest with.

== Plot ==
Langrisser III is a prequel to the first two games in the series and deals with the creation of the sword Langrisser. Consequentially, it is also set before the prequel series Elthlead, and lays the foundation for the wars which take place in that strategy series. The game also introduces the genealogies which dominate most of the Langrisser series, with the exception of Langrisser IV, which is set on the Western continent Yeless.

== Release ==
A limited edition of Langrisser III includes an artbook and a holographic cover.
