= Langrisser V: The End of Legend =

1998 video game

- Developer: Career Soft
- Publisher: Masaya
- Series: Langrisser
- Platforms: Sega Saturn, PlayStation, PlayStation Network
- Release: Sega Saturn: JP: June 18, 1998; PlayStation: JP: January 28, 1999; PlayStation Network: JP: November 25, 2009
- Genre: Tactical role-playing game
- Mode: Single-player

Langrisser V: The End of Legend (ラングリッサーV ジ エンド オブ レジェンド) is a video game in the Langrisser series, and is the sequel to Langrisser IV. It has never been released outside Japan.

== Gameplay ==
Langrisser V is a turn-based strategy game. The player can purchase troops for each commander before battles.

== Development ==
Development began in July 1997 and was completed in March 1998. The music in Langrisser V was composed by Noriyuki Iwadare.

== Story ==
Langrisser V takes place shortly after the end of Langrisser IV.
