= Growlanser: Heritage of War =

2006 video game

- Developer: Career Soft
- Publishers: JP: Atlus; NA: Atlus USA; EU: Rising Star Games
- Composers: Kenichi Tsuchiya; Eisuke Seki
- Series: Growlanser
- Platform: PlayStation 2
- Release: JP: August 3, 2006; NA: September 18, 2007; EU: June 13, 2008
- Genre: Tactical role-playing
- Mode: Single-player

Growlanser: Heritage of War (known as Growlanser V: Generations in Japan) is a tactical role-playing video game for the PlayStation 2. It was developed by Career Soft, and published in Japan by Atlus in 2006. Atlus USA published the game in North America on September 18, 2007, and Rising Star Games released it in Europe on June 13, 2008.

== Gameplay ==
The game uses strategic party-based combat and has a player-manageable character ability tree. It uses hand drawn animation and character portraits by Satoshi Urushihara. It has the ability to cultivate intimate relationships with characters. Battles take place in real-time, and there is no transition to a separate battle map (which is usually found in traditional Japanese RPGs). As such the game forces players to come up with strategies and tactics immediately as the situation calls for it.

== Plot ==
Once, an isolated island continent was plunged into war. The people who wished to end the warring revived a powerful weapon called the "Admonisher" and threatened the participants of the war with it. Thus all of the wars were ended by force. The people behind this called themselves the "Peace Maintenance Brigade". 20 years later the old men of the Brigade are no longer able to maintain the peace.

Now war has once again broken out among the inhabitants of the continent. A mysterious famine has appeared, leaving the citizens to fight over what little fertile land is left, while the cities are constantly attacked by fierce amphibious monsters known as "Screapers".

== Characters ==
Seldous: He sought to end war, and along with Isaac and help from others, they revived an ancient weapon called the Admonisher. He is a chief Commander of the PMB. Voiced by: Kirk Thornton

Krious: Son of Seldous, diplomat of the PMB. He supports the peace enforcement, though eventually disagrees with its method. Voiced by: Sam Riegel

Isaac: Found by Seldous in battlefield, Seldous rescued him. Together they sought a means to end the war. They founded the Peace Meaintenance Brigade. Voiced by: David Lodge

Vanette: Seldous' friend since they were children together in an orphanage. Seldous marries her and they have a child. Voiced by: Julie Ann Taylor

Elessa: Fanille's friend, also a researcher for the PMB in ruins research. Voiced by: Kristen Potter

Melvina: An adjutant to Isaac, the Ops Division. She is a respected officer. Voiced by: Mary Elizabeth McGlynn

== Development ==
The North American limited edition release included a 100-page artbook, multimedia disc of music and artwork, keychain, two lenticular cards, and three pins. The Limited Edition is the only edition of Growlanser V to be published in North America. It was released in a single print and then discontinued. The North American version has a new, smoother engine not present in the Japanese version.

== Reception ==
Kevin Gifford of Newtype USA commented favorably on the character designs and storytelling. The review aggregation site Metacritic gave the game a score of 60 based on seven reviews. Jeff Haynes of IGN was disappointed about the story development and game mechanics giving an overall score of 6.0. Ryan Mattich of RPGFan was not surprised with the 25/40 score given by Weekly Famitsu.
