= Langrisser Schwarz =

- Developer(s): Gamania
- Publisher(s): Extreme Games
- Composer(s): Noriyuki Iwadare
- Series: Langrisser
- Platform(s): Microsoft Windows
- Release: Cancelled
- Genre(s): Massively multiplayer online role-playing game
- Mode(s): Multiplayer

Langrisser Schwarz was a planned free-to-play massively multiplayer online role-playing game based on the Langrisser series in developed by Gamania. It was first revealed at the Tokyo Game Show in 2010. The game would have featured three playable factions.

== Development ==
Langrisser Schwarz was rumored to be in development and slated for a Japanese release based on the trailer shown in the 2010 Tokyo Game Show. Langrisser Schwarz was officially revealed to have an international release as a free-to-play game along with more details about the game in the 2011 Gamania Game Show on September 8–9. Alpha testing of the game began exclusively in China in July 2012. Noriyuki Iwadare was to be the composer of the soundtrack.
