= Interchannel =

Japanese video game developer

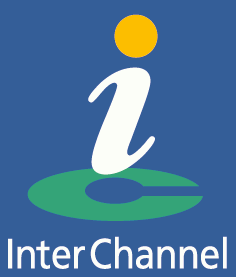
- Type: Division
- Industry: Video games
- Founded: October 2, 1995
- Defunct: March 1, 2010
- Fate: Intellectual properties acquired by Lightweight
- Headquarters: Shinjuku-ku, Tokyo, Japan
- Parent: NEC (1995-2004); Index Corporation (2004-2010)

Interchannel, Inc. (株式会社インターチャネル, Kabushiki-gaisha Intāchaneru) was a Japanese video game developer and publisher.

== History ==
Interchannel was founded on October 2, 1995 as an NEC subsidiary named NEC Interchannel, Ltd. (NECインターチャネル株式会社, NEC Intāchaneru Kabushiki-gaisha). Its founding was a result of divisions within NEC being spun off. NEC Interchannel took over NEC Avenue's music and game operations in October 1997, then acquired its music subsidiary, NEC Avenue Music Publishing, in March 1998. 70 percent of the company was sold to Index Corporation for approximately 3 billion yen ($28 million) in 2004. Around this time, NEC Avenue Music Publishing became IC Avenue Music Publishing Co., Ltd. (株式会社アイシーアベニュー音楽出版, Kabushiki-gaisha Ai Shī Abenyū Ongaku Shuppan). Interchannel's games tended to be Japanese only, however the company established Gamebridge Ltd., a UK-based joint venture with Bergsala, that published its games in Europe. Only ten games were ever published.

In 2006, Index Corporation opened their own music label, Index Music, from assets acquired from IC Avenue, where they specialize in publishing music from kids' anime series. In 2008, T.Y. Limited took over their music label, and in 2013, the music label was transferred over to Dreamusic under a new label, Feel Mee.

In November 2007, GungHo Online Entertainment acquired the video game assets of Interchannel from Index Corporation, however, the Interchannel logo and copyright was maintained by Index Corporation. On March 1, 2010, Lightweight acquired Interchannel. On July 21, 2023, video game developer M2 purchased the rights of NEC Interchannel games published for the Super CD-ROM² systems from Lightweight. Despite this, NEC Interchannel only published two titles in the system: Puyo Puyo CD Tsuu and De-Ja.
