= Growlanser =

- The Growlanser logo
- Genre: Tactical role-playing game
- Developer: Career Soft
- Publishers: Atlus; Rising Star Games
- Artist: Satoshi Urushihara
- Composers: Noriyuki Iwadare; Tomoyuki Hamada
- Platforms: PlayStation, Windows, PlayStation 2, PlayStation Portable
- First release: Growlanser; November 25, 1999
- Latest release: Growlanser: Wayfarer of Time; August 18, 2011

Growlanser (Japanese: グローランサー, Hepburn: Gurōransā) is a series of tactical role-playing games with installments on the PlayStation, PlayStation 2, and PlayStation Portable. The franchise has been developed by Career Soft, and is owned by Atlus and Sega. The series is set in a world that is being taken over by an ancient evil. It is a spiritual successor to Career Soft's earlier Langrisser series. Working Designs published Growlanser II and III in North America together in a package called Growlanser Generations that had additional features. Growlanser V: Generations was published in North America by Atlus USA and Europe by Rising Star Games under the name Growlanser: Heritage of War. The PSP version of Growlanser IV: Wayfarer of Time was also published in North America by Atlus. All titles feature character art by Satoshi Urushihara.

== Games ==
Year	Title	Platform(s)
1999	Growlanser	PlayStation, Windows
2001	Growlanser II: The Sense of Justice	PlayStation 2
2001	Growlanser III: The Dual Darkness	PlayStation 2
2003	Growlanser: Wayfarer of Time	PlayStation 2, PlayStation Portable
2003	Growlanser Collection	PlayStation, PlayStation 2
2004	Growlanser Generations	PlayStation 2
2006	Growlanser: Heritage of War	PlayStation 2
2007	Growlanser VI: Precarious World	PlayStation 2
2009	Growlanser (remake)	PlayStation Portable

== Other merchandise ==
- Soundtrack CDs for the Growlanser series were released in Japan by King Records (I, II, and III), FrontierWorks (IV), Pony Canyon (V) and Sony Music (VI).
- As a companion to Growlanser IV, a collection of entirely vocal music from the game was released as Growlanser IV: Wayfarer of the Time Original Character Song Album.
- With Growlanser IV came an OVA to the series, featuring a situation from the game turned into an anime. Silverneil, the main character of the OVA, travels around in the city trying to figure out what is going on regarding a rebellion and is given the decision either to join it or go against it. The ending theme to the OVA is "Yakusoku" (Promise), featured as track 10 on the Character Song Album.
