= IXIT Corporation =

Japanese technology company

iXIT Corporation
- Native name: iXIT株式会社
- Romanized name: Igujitto Kabushiki gaisha
- Formerly: Index Corporation (2014-2016)
- Type: Subsidiary
- Industry: Information and communications technology
- Founded: April 1, 2014; 12 years ago
- Defunct: April 1, 2026; 6 months ago
- Fate: Absorbed into Excite Japan
- Headquarters: Taishidō,, Setagaya, Tokyo, Japan
- Key people: Shunichi Nakaigawa (president and Representative Director)
- Owner: Sega Corporation (2014–2015); Sawada Holdings (2015–2020); Excite Japan (2020–2026)
- Number of employees: 103 (2019)

iXIT Corporation (Japanese: iXIT株式会社, Hepburn: Igujitto Kabushiki gaisha), formerly known as Index Corporation (株式会社インデックス, Kabushiki gaisha Indekkusu), was a Japanese corporate information and communications technology company owned by Excite Japan.

"Index Corporation" was a corporate name used by three different Japanese companies, between 1997 and 2016, the last one being founded in April 2014. All three incarnations of Index Corporation have been linked to the video game company Atlus at one time or another. The original Index Corporation was founded in 1995 and acquired Atlus in 2006. It went bankrupt in June 2013 while still owning Atlus.

In September 2013, Sega created the shell corporation Sega Dream Corporation with the sole intent of purchasing the assets of Index Corporation. Sega Dream was renamed Index Corporation in November 2013 and gained possession of Atlus' name and intellectual properties. On April 1, 2014, the new Index Corporation was renamed Atlus, but was amputated from its non-gaming business that Sega transferred the same day to a new company called Index Corporation. In 2015, Sega sold Index Corporation to Sawada Holdings. Index Corporation was renamed as iXIT Corporation in July 2016.

== History ==
Index Corporation
- Native name: 株式会社インデックス
- Romanized name: Kabushiki gaisha Indekkusu
- Formerly: Nozark BNS (1995-1997); Index Corporation (1997-2006); Index Holdings (2006-2010)
- Type: Kabushiki gaisha Subsidiary
- Traded as: TYO: 4835
- Industry: Information and communications technology
- Founded: September 1, 1995
- Defunct: September 5, 2013
- Fate: Business operations taken over by Sega. Assets absorbed into Sega Dream Corporation.
- Headquarters: Taishido, Setagaya, Tokyo, Japan
- Key people: Yoshimi Ochiai (President)
- Revenue: ¥39.379 million
- Divisions: Atlus
- Subsidiaries: Career Soft; Index Asia Ltd. Index Digital Media

Index Corporation Ltd. was founded on 1 September 1995 as a mobile content service provider. It adopted the name of Index by 1997 and expanded into one of Japan's most successful companies, with acquisitions into several communications and entertainment ventures, including the anime studio Madhouse, game companies Atlus and Interchannel, and major movie studio Nikkatsu. It also made inroads into numerous worldwide ventures, including the United States, United Kingdom and France, where it owned the football club Grenoble Foot 38, which, upon Index's acquisition, achieved promotion to Ligue 1. Up to 2013, Index Corporation had sold most of its subsidiaries. In June 2013, following investigations for fraud, Index Corporation was forced to file for civil rehabilitation bankruptcy.

On November 9, 2010, Index Holdings (株式会社インデックス・ホールディングス) announced its renaming to Index Corporation (株式会社インデックス), to be confirmed on the 15th shareholders meeting on November 25, 2010, effective on December 1, 2010. On June 27, 2013, following an investigation for fraud, Index Corporation filed for civil rehabilitation bankruptcy due to a debt consisting of 24.5 billion yen.

On September 18, 2013, it was reported that Sega Sammy Holdings had won a bid to acquire Index for 14 billion yen. Sega Sammy Holdings denied taking over Index Corporation at first, however it announced later that day that Index Corporation would sell the digital game business, contents and solution business, and amusement business to Sega Dream Corporation (株式会社セガドリーム), a subsidiary of Sega Corporation established on September 5, 2013, effective on November 1, 2013. The sales covered fixed assets and intellectual property assets of the announced operations, which included Atlus Holding, Inc. (parent company of Index Digital Media, Inc.), Tiger Mob Limited, Index Corp (Thailand) Ltd., Mobi Town Ltd. However, liabilities including interest-bearing debts would not be taken over. On November 1, 2013, Sega announced that it will rename its subsidiary, Sega Dream Corporation, to Index Corporation (株式会社 インデックス). On February 18, 2014, Sega and Index Corporation announced the separation of Index Corporation's contents and solution businesses into a new subsidiary under the name 'Index Corporation' (株式会社インデックス), while renaming the 'old' Index Corporation and its remaining digital game business division into 'Atlus' (株式会社アトラス), effective on April 1, 2014. The new Atlus would also include the foreign subsidiary Index Digital Media, Inc., which would be renamed to Atlus U.S.A., Inc. at the effective establishment day of the new Atlus.

On May 28, 2014, Masami Ochiai, chairman of the former Index Corporation, and his wife Yoshimi Ochiai, president of the company, were arrested by the Tokyo District Public Prosecutors Office on suspicion of falsifying stock reports for the company.

On December 1, 2015, as part of a structural reform within the Sega Sammy Holdings group, Sega Holdings sold its shares of Index Corporation to Sawada Holdings, a firm owned by H.I.S. founder Hideo Sawada. Through this business transfer, Index Corporation became a wholly owned subsidiary of Sawada Holdings. On July 1, 2016, Index Corporation changed its name to iXIT Corporation.

== Index Asia Ltd ==
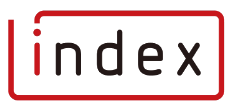
The logo for the reformed Index Corporation under Sega. This logo is currently used by Index Asia Ltd.

Index Asia Ltd., formerly known as Index Corporation Thailand Ltd., is a mobile content and service provider in Thailand that was established in April 2002. Once Index Corporation Thailand Ltd. was amalgamated with Mobi Town Ltd., and Tiger Mob Ltd., the company was re-branded as Index Asia Ltd.

They are a subsidiary of iXIT Corporation that provides mobile software application, licensing and application development services within Thailand. Index Asia Ltd. has a distinctive business structure with three primary services, the Game Publishing & Game Management Services: the service dedicated to video game development and publishing, the Application Development & Solution Provider: the services dedicated to original mobile application developments, and the Mobile Content Aggregator & Provider Services: the services dedicated to mobile content and licensing distribution.

Index Corporation Thailand Ltd., was renamed to Index Asia Ltd. effective 1 July 2015. This was achieved through an amalgamation of Index Corporations remaining subsidiaries: Mobi Town Ltd. and Tiger Mob Ltd. being absorbed into Index Corporation Thailand Ltd. and the surviving company being renamed to Index Asia Ltd. The process was accomplished in the Ministry of Commerce of Thailand.

On December 1, 2015, when the Sega Holdings group sold its shares of Index Corporation to Sawada Holdings, Index Asia Ltd. was transferred over alongside Index Corporation.

== Former subsidiaries ==
Name	Purpose	Outcome	Ref.
Index Magazines Corporation (株式会社インデックス・マガジンズ)	Magazine Subsidiary.	Absorbed into Index Communications Corporation effective August 22, 2005.	
Nikkatsu Corporation (日活株式会社)	Japanese motion picture subsidiary.	Transferred to SKY Perfect Communications Inc. effective December 2005.	
Style Index Co., Ltd. (スタイル・インデックス株式会社)	Index Corporation subsidiary.	Absorbed into Index Corporation effective August 22, 2005.	
Index Media Co., Ltd. (インデックス ミーメディア株式会社)	Index Corporation subsidiary.	Absorbed into Index Corporation effective August 22, 2005.	
POLLEX (株式会社)	Video game publishing subsidiary for South Korea.	Absorbed into Hyundai-Index Corporation effective July 15, 2009.	
Hyundai-Index Corporation (現代インデックス株式会社)	Japanese wholesale and electronics subsidiary.	Became an independent company effective July 15, 2009.	
C&C Media Co., Ltd. (株式会社シーアンドシーメディア)	Online video game publishing subsidiary.	Transferred over to Perfect World effective February 1, 2010.	
Index Europe Holdings Limited	European subsidiary for Index Corporation activities.	Dissolved effective June 30, 2010.	
Netindex ES (株式会社ネットインデックス・イー・エス)	Communications device subsidiary.	Merged into Netindex Inc. effective November 1, 2010.	
Net mobile Inc. (株式会社ネットモバイル)	Software marketing subsidiary.	Merged into Netindex Inc. effective November 1, 2010.	
Madhouse Inc. (株式会社マッドハウス)	Japanese animation subsidiary.	Transferred over to NTV effective February 8, 2011.	
Dynamo amusement, Inc. (株式会社ダイナモアミューズメント)	CG production studio subsidiary.	Became independent company effective March 18, 2011.	
Rosso Index K.K. (株式会社ロッソインデックス)	Digital gaming publishing subsidiary.	Transferred to C FACTORY Co., Ltd. effective July 27, 2011.	
Index Corporation (株式会社インデックス)	Mobile gaming subsidiary.	Merged with Atlus Co. effective on August 30, 2011.	
NCXX Inc. (株式会社ネクス)	Mobile and wireless service subsidiary.	Transferred to Fisco Ltd. effective July 2012.	
TEMO Inc. (株式会社テモ)	Search application provider.	Absorbed into Index Corporation effective November 1, 2012.	
Interchannel Co., Ltd. (株式会社インターチャネル)	Video game development subsidiary.	Video game assets transferred to GungHo Online Entertainment effective November 1, 2007. Interchannel brand dissolved effective September 5, 2013.	
Atlus Co., Ltd. (株式会社アトラス)	Video game development subsidiary.	Transferred to Sega Sammy Holdings effective September 5, 2013.	
Index Digital Media, Inc. (Atlus U.S.A.)	Video game publisher and licensor subsidiary for North American markets.	Transferred to Sega Sammy Holdings effective September 5, 2013.	
Index Multimédia SA (インデックス・マルチメディア)	Multimedia platform service subsidiary for France.	Dissolved effective October 17, 2013.	
Mobi Town Ltd.	Index Corporation subsidiary.	Absorbed into Index Asia Ltd. effective July 1, 2015.	
Tiger Mob Ltd.	Index Corporation subsidiary.	Absorbed into Index Asia Ltd. effective July 1, 2015.	
