= Mystaria: The Realms of Lore =

1995 video game

- European Saturn cover art
- Developers: Sega; Microcabin
- Publisher: Sega
- Directors: Yasuhiko Nakatsu; Hiroto Saeki
- Producers: Noriyoshi Oba; Yoji Ishii
- Designer: Yasuhiko Nakatsu
- Artist: Masashi Kato
- Writer: Masato Izumi
- Composer: Yukiharu Urita
- Platform: Sega Saturn
- Release: JP: July 21, 1995; NA: December 27, 1995; PAL: January 26, 1996
- Genre: Tactical RPG
- Mode: Single player

Mystaria: The Realms of Lore, released as Riglord Saga in Japan, is a 1995 tactical role-playing game for the Sega Saturn. In May 1996 it was re-released as Blazing Heroes in North America. Its graphics consist of pre-rendered sprites and polygonal backgrounds.

Its sequel, Riglord Saga 2, was released in Japan on November 8, 1996 for the Sega Saturn.

== Story ==
The player controls Aragon and his party to try to reclaim the land to free the people. Aragon's mother, the Queen of Queensland, has been placed under a spell by Lord Bane and has handed her country over to him. Lord Bane has complete control over her and she believes that the prince and the others are traitorous rebels.

== Gameplay ==
The player manipulates characters along grid-based battlefields, upon which the characters may interact with objects, enemies, and other characters that are within their range. Battles are turn-based according to party; first the player maneuvers all his party members, then the enemy AI maneuvers all enemy units, then the player takes control again, and so on. Each turn, the player can move each character once and have them either attack, defend, cast a spell, or use an item. Unlike most Tactical RPGs, battles in Mystaria frequently require something other than eliminating all enemy units to be completed, such as reaching a specific destination or avoiding contact with enemies entirely.

Playing as primarily Aragon, the player gathers a team of 12 heroes. The recruitment of team members, however, is non-linear and the story adjusts itself to the newest character that has joined.

Each characters has specific fighting techniques and will develop new techniques with practice. Which techniques are learned next depends on which already known techniques the characters practice, allowing creative development of each character. For example, utilizing Ferral's "Spear Attack" will lead to Ferral learning stronger Spear techniques such as "Spinning Spear" more quickly, while using "Punch" and "Kick" will help him acquire more Hand to Hand techniques such as "Martial Throw" and "Hundred Hands". Once acquired, new techniques must be added to the character's quick menu so that they can actually be used. Additionally, all techniques used by enemies can be acquired by having Galford use "Steal Technique".

The graphics are in 3D throughout the game, and a few battlefields take place on multiple levels. Three different views are possible for playing the game: aerial, 1st person, and horizontal. It is also possible to view a grid overlay of the battlefield.

== Reception ==
Reception

Review scores
Publication	Score
Electronic Gaming Monthly	8/10
Game Informer	8.25/10
Next Generation	3/5
Maximum	3/5
Sega Saturn Magazine	80%

On release, Famicom Tsūshin scored the game a 31 out of 40, giving it a 9 out of 10 in their Reader Cross Review. Sega Saturn Magazine argued that the game has too little story to win over European gamers, most of whom held a firm dislike for RPGs at the time Mystaria was released. Electronic Gaming Monthly commented that the menu system seems cumbersome at first but proves to be easily accessible and engaging. Though some of the reviewers felt the battles went on too long, they all praised the high level of strategy the game demands of the player. Maximum contended that Mystaria has too much gameplay, and that it should have focused more on cutscenes. They also criticized the absence of voice acting, and concluded that "at times it's even quite good fun and it's certainly big enough to warrant a purchase if you like these kinds of titles anyway. However, it's not going to win over any new recruits, because it gets very tedious at times." GamePro praised the graphics, particularly the rotation and scaling used in the attack animations, but criticized the music and absence of voice acting, and argued that turn-based strategy games are by definition boring. Next Generation stated that "for those eager to get a look at a next generation RPG, Riglord Saga is not at all a bad place to start."
