= Warsong =

1991 video game

- North American cover art
- Developer: Masaya Games (Team Career)
- Publishers: JP: Masaya; NA: Treco
- Composers: Noriyuki Iwadare; Isao Mizoguchi; Hiroshi Fujioka
- Series: Langrisser
- Platforms: Sega Genesis, PC Engine CD, PlayStation, Sega Saturn, PC
- Release: JP: April 26, 1991; NA: March 1992
- Genre: Tactical role-playing game
- Mode: Single-player

Warsong, known as Langrisser (ラングリッサー) in Japan, is a tactical role-playing game. The first in the Langrisser series, it blended tactical warfare with RPG elements, similar to the Fire Emblem series. It was initially released for the Sega Genesis console and later the PC Engine CD (in Super CD-ROM² format), the former version being published by Treco in America. The PC Engine version was released under the title Langrisser: The Descendants of Light. It was re-released alongside Der Langrisser (a remake of Langrisser II) in a compilation for the Sega Saturn and PlayStation. That compilation was released for the PlayStation Network in 2009. A full remake of Langrisser I & II was also released in 2019 on both Sony PlayStation 4 and Nintendo Switch and on PC in 2020, featuring new graphics and BGM and also new playable characters and multiple paths through the game for Langrisser I.

== Gameplay ==
The player controls a group of heroes or commanders to accomplish some goals each phase. They are joined with non-controlled allies to battle with enemy commanders. Before each phase, the player can purchase up to eight army units from a single type for every one of its heroes. The type of the available army depends on the hero class (e.g. Griffons can only be purchased by Dragon Knights) and have different prices. At the end of each phase, any surviving army provides some amount of cash for the player to use next time.

After each battle, the winning commander gains experience that allows him to upgrade to a more powerful class. If a hero dies, he is lost forever; if the main hero dies, the game is over.

During the game, the player slowly acquires ally leaders, each of whom can hire up to 8 troops (each troop representing 10 soldiers) to fight in stages called Scenarios. Each scenario starts the player out in a defensive position with enemies nearby and a goal to accomplish. Typical goals are, "Protect this person", "Destroy all the enemies", "Destroy the enemy leader (other enemies optional)" and several other types. The player chooses where to place their troops in the beginning, and the formations they want to fight in.

Along the way, the player also acquires special items that can increase the power of their commanders. As their commanders gain experience, they can be promoted to different "classes" with new spells, and new abilities.

== Story ==
The storyline follows the armies of Prince Garett of Baltia as they battle the Dalsis Empire and the monsters they unwittingly awaken, framed as a battle between the forces of good and an ancient evil that threatens to overrun the world.

The story begins with an assault on the Nation of Baltia by the forces of the Dalsis Empire. King Alfador sees the castle will not be able to stand and urges his son Prince Garett to flee to the town of Sulras, both for his own safety and to gather reinforcements from Duke Carleon. He assigns the sword master Baldarov to go with Garett and protect him on the journey.

Together they escape from the siege and journey to Sulras, meeting the cleric Mina on the way. The three of them help defend the town from a bandit raid in the night, and are granted some reinforcements by Duke Carleon. Before they can start the journey back, Sabra, one of Baltia's commanders, arrives to tell them that the Castle has already fallen to Dalsis and many of the other commanders have been taken prisoner. As he returns to the castle he is set upon by monsters in the woods, but he perseveres and eventually arrives at the castle. He leads a campaign to retake the Castle, freeing the prisoners, but Dalsis has already taken the treasure Baltia was protecting, the magic sword "Warsong".

Garett then rushes to the aid of Anzel, one of Baltia's fortresses, which is also under siege. He rescues the fortress' commander Bayard, and begins his march through the Dalsis Empire towards Emperor Pythion's palace. Duke Carleon himself commits to the cause, joining the fight by Garett's side. The monsters that are encountered as they travel into Dalsis continue to become more vicious, numerous, and powerful as time goes by, and Garett realizes they are attacking the Dalsis forces as well as his own. He arrives at the palace and defeats Emperor Pythion, and the emperor explains that he awakened the ancient evil with Warsong.

Garett retakes Warsong and begins his campaign against the evil, fighting ever more powerful monsters along the way and eventually tracking their source to the dark land of Seneferia. He finally gains access to a citadel in Seneferia that is the home of the ancient evil, and deep within the citadel he fights the embodiment of that evil, Chaos.

After slaying Chaos, the defeated being admonishes Garett by explaining that Order and Chaos were created by the world itself and Chaos was revived to help save the world from destruction by keeping it in balance. Chaos also says that it will return as long as humans continue to fight one another. The citadel then sinks into the ground as Garett and friends escape, and Garett wonders whether they have actually saved the world, or set it on the path to ruin.

== Music ==
The music in Langrisser was composed by Noriyuki Iwadare and Isao Mizoguchi.

== Other media ==
- Langrisser Gaiden (ラングリッサー外伝) is a one-shot manga based on the first game, released as part of the Dengeki Mega Drive in February 1993.
- Langrisser Densetsu e no Michishirube (ラングリッサー 伝説への道標; lit. "Langrisser: A Guidepost to the Legend") is a light novel based on the first game, published by Kadokawa Sneaker Bunko in August 1997.
