= Langrisser II =

1994 role-playing game for the Sega Mega Drive

- Developer: Masaya Games (Team Career)
- Publisher: Masaya
- Series: Langrisser
- Platforms: Mega Drive; Super Famicom; Sega Saturn; PlayStation; PC-FX; Windows
- Release: JP: August 26, 1994
- Genre: Tactical role-playing game
- Mode: Single-player

Langrisser II is a tactical role-playing game for the Sega Mega Drive console. It is the sequel to Langrisser. Langrisser II was remade for the Super Famicom by Masaya as Der Langrisser, which featured multiple paths through the game, greatly reduced difficulty, and reworked graphics. A PC-FX port, Der Langrisser FX, was also released, featuring animated cutscenes. It was later compiled with the first Langrisser for the PlayStation as Langrisser I & II, and then given a script edit and new branch of the Imperial path in its Saturn remake as Langrisser: Dramatic Edition. A Windows 98 port of the game was released in Japanese, Chinese and Korean; it features redrawn, high-resolution graphics, but a vastly trimmed-down soundtrack to fit the confines of a standard CD. A full remake of Langrisser I & II was also released in 2019 on both Sony PlayStation 4 and Nintendo Switch and on PC in 2020, featuring new graphics and BGM.

== Plot ==
=== Overview ===
Der Langrisser was one of the first tactical RPGs to allow the player a choice of story paths. Depending on the player's choices, the protagonist of the game, Erwin, can switch allegiances between three factions: the Descendants of Light, the Rayguard Empire, and the Demon Tribe. Alternatively, he can choose to create his own faction in opposition to the other three.

Erwin begins the game on the side of the Descendants of Light, fighting against the Rayguard Empire, which has enlisted the aid of the Dark Lord Böser in the interest of unifying the continent and putting an end to the wars which plague it, unaware that Böser is chiefly responsible for the conflicts. To unify the continent, the Empire needs the power of the two legendary swords, Alhazard and its anti-type, Langrisser. Determined that the two swords should not serve one master, the Descendants of Light, led by Jessica, pledge to stop the Empire from finding Langrisser. Erwin commits to discovering Langrisser before the Empire.

Erwin's rival for Langrisser, Leon, is the leader of the Empire's Blue Dragon Knights and a frequent obstacle to Erwin's progress. By chance, however, the two find themselves participating in a common cause, and begin to suspect that the differences between them are not as great as they imagined. Leon suggests that Erwin side with the Empire, the choice of which is left to the player's discretion. If Erwin sides with the Empire, the roles of protagonist and antagonist are reversed: Jessica's Descendants of Light side against Erwin and the player, and the Rayguard Empire allies itself to Erwin. Former allies become enemies, and previously defeated enemy commanders become allies. The choice of sides carries significant weight to the story, because Erwin will ultimately have to kill the opposing side's commanders to bring peace.

If the player refuses Leon's offer to change sides, Erwin will remain with the Descendants of Light until the Empire is completely crushed. If the player accepts, Erwin remains with Rayguard until Langrisser is found, at which point the player may choose to betray the Empire if Erwin takes Langrisser before Leon. If Erwin betrays the Empire, he commits himself to the destruction of both the Empire and the Descendants of Light. The Prince of Darkness Böser, sensing Erwin's strength, himself betrays the Empire and places his forces under the player's command. Erwin remains with Böser until the unsealing of Alhazard, at which point he may leave it to the player's discretion whether or not to continue on with Böser or to betray him. If Boser is betrayed, Erwin will commit to a totally independent path of absolute peace for demons and humans, ultimately setting himself in opposition to the Goddess Lushiris herself. If Erwin remains loyal to Böser, he commits to destroying the Demon Tribe's enemies and taking power for himself, assuming the character of a sociopath.

==== Relations with Kaiser Bernhardt ====
Depending on the path taken, Erwin's relationship to Kaiser Bernhardt, the leader of the Rayguard Empire, takes one of several forms. On the Light Path, the steady advance of Erwin and the Descendents of Light compels Bernhardt to ever greater dependence on the Demon Tribe and Alhazard, culminating in his suicide as a final act of defiance against Erwin. On the Imperial Path, Erwin submits to Bernhardt's rule and is given Al-hazard as a token of Bernhardt's esteem. On the Independent and Chaos paths, Erwin hunts Bernhardt after an attempt by Rayguard to ambush Erwin fails. Bernhardt escapes long enough to reflect on his ambitions and their consequences, but is cornered and killed by Erwin. If Erwin has accepted the Independent path, Bernhardt takes solace in the knowledge that Erwin intends to bring peace after he is gone. If Erwin has chosen the Chaos path, Bernhardt leaves him with a warning against the use of peace and darkness for the same ends, which Erwin fails to comprehend.

==== Relations with the Goddess, Lushiris ====
Because Erwin is presented as the avatar of Lushiris' will, Lushiris is accepting of the player's decisions in his name, even if she disagrees with them. Although Lushiris does not appear on the Light path due to Erwin's compliance with her wishes, Erwin's use of Langrisser for ends opposite her own provokes her to action on the Independent and Chaos paths. Should Erwin take the independent road, he will find himself in opposition to Jessica, who serves as Lushiris' formal avatar on behalf of her own personal desires. Jessica plans to defeat Erwin by deactivating Langrisser, believing Lushiris will be open to this possibility due to the defeat of Böser and the non-necessity of Langrisser's continued existence as a counterweight to Alhazard. To prevent this from happening, Erwin invades Lushiris' domain before she can act. Lushiris determines that Erwin has strayed from her guidance as a means of proving that a person as great as Erwin can exist, as a testament to humanity's ability to end social conflicts and bring peace. Erwin defeats Lushiris but not before receiving a final warning that one day he too will be confronted with someone with the will to overthrow the existing order, just as he has done to Lushiris. Her words prove prophetic, as Erwin finds himself faced with a new movement of people who believe that if only they are strong enough, they too could rule El Sallia.

Lushiris takes a different approach on the Chaos path. Unable to accept the possibility of Chaos' reign, she personally descends to El Sallia to defeat Erwin after Jessica is killed. Although Erwin defeats her, Lushiris poses an ominous warning to Erwin before dying, arguing that although his way has proven triumphant, he is nearly insane and capable of great destruction. If he should abuse his position as ruler, she warns, her will would re-manifest and punish him. Although there is no clear statement of her return in the epilogue, Erwin is described as facing a rebellion of people who have united in the face of a common enemy, suggesting it is her spirit within them that has taken its vengeance for Erwin's misdeeds.

== Music ==
The music in Langrisser II was composed by Noriyuki Iwadare and Isao Mizoguchi.

An arranged soundtrack Langrisser II Original Game Music, based on the original Sega Genesis version of the game, was released on October 26, 1994, by Toshiba EMI. Its catalog code is TYCY-5403.

== Other media ==
In June 1994, a light novel was released, containing two volumes based on the second game that was published by Kadokawa Sneaker Bunko.

== Reception ==
On release, Famicom Tsūshin scored the Super Famicom version of the game a 31 out of 40.
