= Atlus =

Japanese video game company

Atlus Co., Ltd.

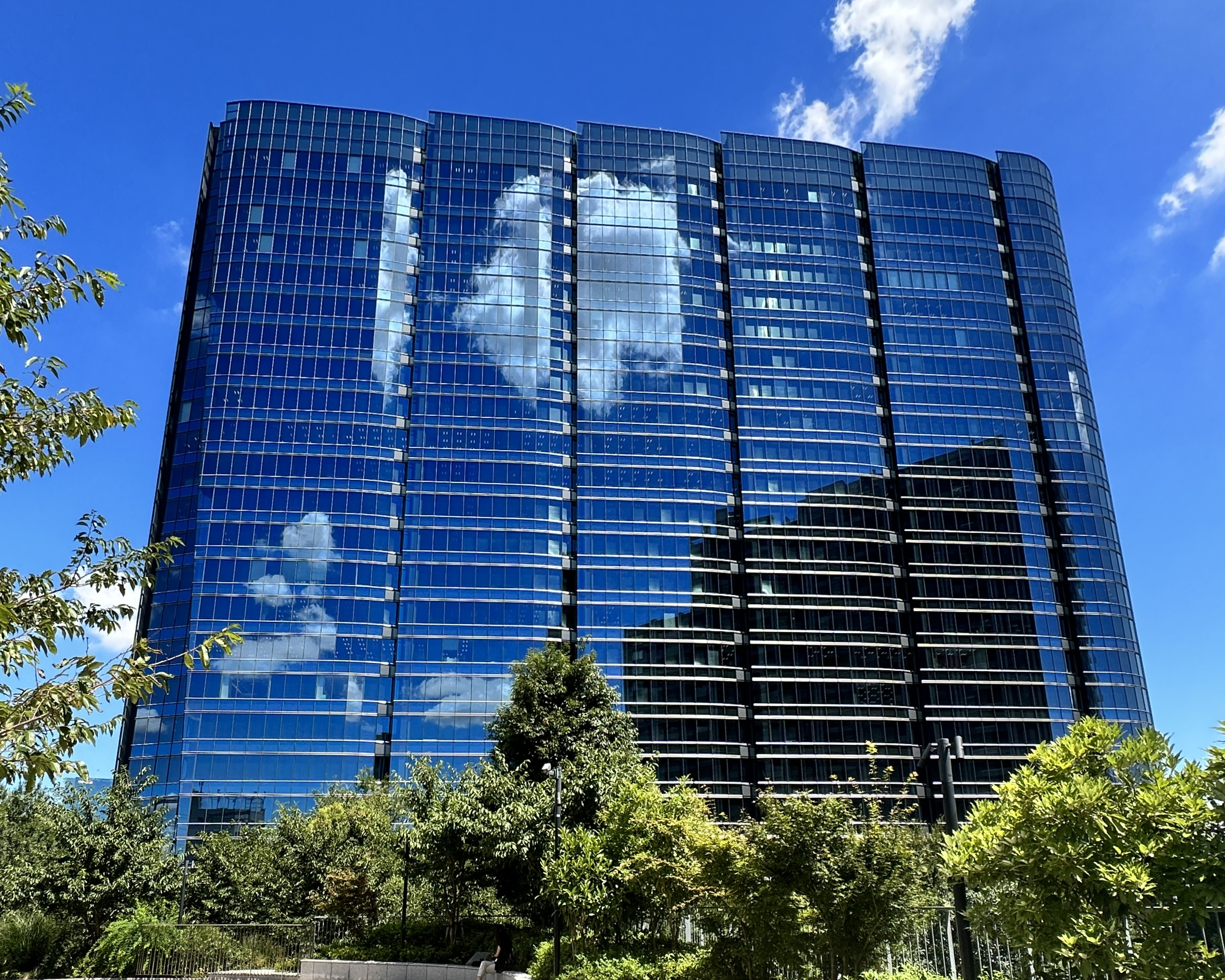
- Headquarters in Shinagawa, Tokyo
- Trade name: Atlus
- Native name: 株式会社アトラス
- Romanized name: Kabushiki gaisha Atorasu
- Formerly: Sega Dream Corporation (2013); Index Corporation (2013–2014)
- Type: Subsidiary
- Industry: Video games
- Founded: 7 April 1986; 40 years ago (as Atlus Co., Ltd.); 5 September 2013; 13 years ago (as Sega Dream Corporation)
- Founder: Naoya Harano
- Defunct: 1 October 2010; 16 years ago (as Atlus Co., Ltd.)
- Fate: Merged and folded into Index Corporation (original)
- Headquarters: Nishi-Shinagawa, Shinagawa, Tokyo, Japan
- Key people: Shuji Utsumi (chairman); Osamu Ohashi (president)
- Products: List of Atlus games
- Number of employees: 474 (May 2026)
- Parent: Takara (majority stake, 2003–2006); Index Corporation (2006–2013); Sega Corporation (2013–present)
- Divisions: Team Maniax; P-Studio; Studio Zero
- Website: atlus.co.jp

Atlus Co., Ltd. (Japanese: 株式会社アトラス, Hepburn: Kabushikigaisha Atorasu; stylized in all caps) is a Japanese video game developer, publisher, arcade manufacturer and distribution company based in Tokyo. A subsidiary of Sega, the company is known for the Megami Tensei, Persona, Etrian Odyssey, and Trauma Center series. Its corporate mascot is Jack Frost, a snowman-like character from its Megami Tensei series. The company is also known for its Print Club photo sticker arcade machines in East Asia.

Atlus was established in April 1986 and spent its early years as a video game developer for other companies. It became a video game publisher of its own in 1989 and existed until it was merged into Index Corporation in October 2010. The Atlus name continued as a brand used by Index Corporation for video game publishing until it filed for bankruptcy in June 2013. This company was then acquired by Sega via its new subsidiary Sega Dream Corporation which renamed itself Index Corporation in November 2013. In April 2014, the non-video game assets and the Index name were spun off as a separate subsidiary of Sega, leaving the company with its video game division to be officially renamed Atlus.

A North American branch of the company, originally Atlus USA and now Atlus West, was founded in 1991 in order to focus on publishing and localizing games for North America. A European branch, handled via the London-based Sega Europe, was founded in 2017.

== History ==
Logo until 2013

Atlus began on 7 April 1986 as a video game developer of computer games for other companies. In January 1987, Atlus started selling amusement equipment. It expanded into the sale of karaoke equipment in March 1989. Atlus released the first video game under its own name in 1989: Puzzle Boy for the Game Boy. Prior to this, earlier Atlus video games were published by other companies, such as Namco and Hudson Soft in Japan and LJN in North America.

Atlus started in the arcade industry in the 1990s by manufacturing its first arcade video game, BlaZeon, in 1992. In 1995, Atlus launched Print Club (Purikura) at arcades in partnership with Sega. It is a photo sticker booth that produces selfie photos. It was conceived by Atlus employee Sasaki Miho in 1994; her bosses at Atlus were initially reluctant about the idea, before later deciding to go ahead with it. Atlus and Sega introduced Purikura in February 1995, initially at game arcades, before expanding to other popular culture locations such as fast food shops, train stations, karaoke establishments and bowling alleys. Purikura became a popular form of entertainment among youths across East Asia, laying the foundations for modern selfie culture. It also introduced a large female demographic to the company's previously male-dominated arcade customer base. By 1996, it accounted for 70% of the company's revenue. By 1997, about 47,000 Purikura machines had been sold, earning Sega an estimated ¥25 billion (£173 million) or $283,000,000 (equivalent to $568,000,000 in 2025) annually from Purikura sales that year. Various other similar purikura machines appeared from other manufacturers, with Sega controlling about half of the market in 1997. Print Club went on to generate over $1 billion in sales for Atlus and Sega.

Atlus entered the Tokyo Stock Exchange in 1997, listing on the JASDAQ. In its goal to further increase its presence in the amusement industry, Atlus acquired the manufacturer Apies from Yubis Corporation in 1999. In 2000, Atlus formed a joint venture with Kadokawa Shoten to distribute and sell games. Atlus suffered from deficit financial results in both 1999 and 2000. To address the issue, Atlus established a management reform plan in 2001. In its restructuring efforts, Atlus sold two subsidiaries (one of them being Apies) to their respective employees as part of a management buyout.

In October 2001, Atlus acquired Career Soft, and became the sole publisher of the Growlanser series: a real-time strategy role-playing game from the creators of the Langrisser series. In 2004, after the release of Growlanser IV, the majority of Career Soft's staff was merged into the main development team of Atlus where they worked on the Shin Megami Tensei: Devil Survivor games. As a developer brand, Career Soft was eventually dissolved.

In October 2003, Japanese toy company Takara acquired Atlus. Takara's video game business was also transferred over to Atlus. On 21 November 2006, Index Holdings announced the acquisition of Atlus, effective on 30 October 2006, and purchased 7.7 million shares (54.93 percent; 77,000 votes, or 54.96 percent of the voting rights) on 20 November 2006. Atlus became an Index Holdings subsidiary on 29 November 2006.

In March 2009, Atlus and Sting Entertainment announced a publishing partnership making Atlus the only publisher of Sting-developed games in Japan. On 17 September 2009, Index Holdings announced the separation of Atlus' amusement facility and related business into a subsidiary, New Entertainment Waves, effective on 1 December. One hundred seventy-two shares of the subsidiary's stock were also transferred to Chushoukigyou Leisure on 1 December.

On 30 August 2010, Index Holdings announced its merger with Atlus, with Index Holdings being the surviving company, effective on 1 October. After the merger, Index Holdings would continue to operate the Atlus brand. Although fans were concerned about the company's future, CEO Shinichi Suzuki said that Atlus would continue to provide the "finest quality game experiences possible" and the merger "further strengthens the foundation of Atlus, both in Japan and here in the United States." On 9 November 2010 Index Holdings announced its renaming to Index Corporation, to be confirmed at the shareholders meeting on 25 November 2010 and effective on 1 December.

From 2010 to 2013, Atlus, as a company, ceased to exist and its name became a brand of Index Corporation for video games in Japan. However, Atlus USA remained active and was renamed Index Digital Media, serving as the North American subsidiary for Index Corporation. Much like in Japan, video games continued to be released in that region under the Atlus name during this period.

In June 2013, it was reported that Index Corporation filed for civil rehabilitation proceedings, facing bankruptcy with debts of ¥24.5 billion. An Atlus USA spokesperson said that Index Digital Media and the Atlus brand were unaffected by the proceedings. On 18 September 2013, it was reported that Sega won a bid to acquire the bankrupt Index for ¥14 billion. All Index operations, including the Atlus brand and Index Digital Media (Atlus USA), were transferred on 1 November 2013 to Sega Dream Corporation (a new subsidiary established on 5 September 2013). That day, Sega announced that it would change the name of Sega Dream Corporation to Index Corporation.

On 18 February 2014, Sega announced the separation of Index Corporation's contents and solution businesses into a new subsidiary, Index Corporation, renaming the old Index Corporation and its remaining digital game business division to Atlus effective 1 April 2014. The new Atlus would include the foreign subsidiary, Index Digital Media, which would revert its name back to Atlus USA at the establishment of the new Atlus.

In April 2017, Sega Sammy Holdings announced a relocation of head office functions of the Sega Sammy Group and its major domestic subsidiaries located in the Tokyo metropolitan area to Shinagawa-ku by January 2018. Their stated reasoning was to promote cooperation among companies and creation of more active interaction of personnel, while pursuing efficient group management by consolidating scattered head office functions of the group. Atlus is one of the companies that has relocated in response to this.

== Development organization ==
Atlus currently has three internal development divisions inside the company responsible for the development of its titles:

- Creative Department 1st Production (Team Maniax): Headed by Shinjiro Takata as a production manager, this is the oldest and original production team, which has been active since the very beginning of the company. This is the group responsible for the development of the Megami Tensei series in general from mainline titles such as Shin Megami Tensei to spin-offs such as Devil Children series, Persona series prior to Persona 3, Devil Summoner series, Last Bible series, Majin Tensei series, Digital Devil Saga series, Tokyo Mirage Sessions ♯FE among many others. Outside of the Megami Tensei series, the group also created and developed the Trauma Center series and the Etrian Odyssey series.
- Creative Department 2nd Production (P-Studio): Headed by Kazuhisa Wada, this group was established by Atlus during the development of Persona 3 in 2006, to coexist with the Creative Department 1st Production also known as Team Maniax, who were primarily responsible for developing entries in the Megami Tensei series at the company. The 2nd Production division would instead become the primary in charge of developing and overseeing all games and other products related to the Persona series, after all previous entries in the series on the original PlayStation had been mainly developed by Team Maniax. Leading the new Persona development team would be Katsura Hashino, who served as the director of Persona 3 and other Atlus games such as Shin Megami Tensei III: Nocturne and went to be the director of Persona 4 and Persona 5, being involved on various spin-offs until he departed from the division to create another one within Atlus. After Hashino left in 2016, long time director and producer Kazuhisa Wada became the head of the division. Outside of developing and overseeing all Persona games and products, P-Studio also developed the game Catherine in 2011.
- Creative Department 3rd Production (Studio Zero): Headed by Katsura Hashino. In 2016, following the Japanese launch of Persona 5, director and producer Hashino talked about his intent to depart P-Studio and retire his commitment to the Persona series, citing a desire to move onto another project due to his feelings that Persona 5 would mark a shift in the series' overall direction. He would eventually be part of a new Creative Department production division established by Atlus, its third one mainly known as Studio Zero, which would become responsible for developing original IP and content unrelated to Persona. With fourteen P-Studio employees including main staff from the Persona series becoming part of the group like character designer Shigenori Soejima, scenario writers Yuichiro Tanaka and Azusa Kido, lead programmer Yujiro Kosaka and graphic designer Yasuhiro Akimoto, alongside new hires to the division, they primarily developed the 2024 game Metaphor: ReFantazio, a fantasy role-playing video game which was originally announced with a concept art as Project Re Fantasy in 2016 when Studio Zero was founded. Studio Zero's first project, the enhanced re-release Catherine: Full Body, was released in 2019.

== International branches ==
=== Atlus West ===
Atlus USA booth at Electronic Entertainment Expo 2017

Atlus West (formerly known as Atlus U.S.A., Inc.) established in 1991 and based in Irvine, California, is the American subsidiary of Atlus and publishes games created by Atlus and other developers. It was formally called Index Digital Media from 2010 to 2014 in response to Atlus being dissolved into Index Corporation.

A number of Megami Tensei games have not been released in North America. During the 1990s, Jack Bros. for Virtual Boy, Revelations: Persona for PlayStation and Revelations: The Demon Slayer for the Game Boy Color were the first three games in the series to have a North American release. The 2004 release of Shin Megami Tensei: Nocturne was the first main-series video-game release in the U.S. Since then, the series has continued to be localized and released in the US, including games such as Persona 3, Devil Summoner: Raidou Kuzunoha vs. The Soulless Army, and Shin Megami Tensei: Strange Journey.

Atlus West has localized cult classic Disgaea: Hour of Darkness, created by Nippon Ichi Software. The company have also published the tactical role-playing game Tactics Ogre and Game Boy Advance remakes of the Kunio-kun and Double Dragon games for Million (a company composed of former Technōs Japan employees). Other notable titles include Snowboard Kids and Snowboard Kids 2 (for Nintendo 64) and Odin Sphere and the Trauma Center series. Atlus USA released Riviera: The Promised Land, a role-playing video game for the Game Boy Advance previously released for the Wonderswan Color, in 2004 in collaboration with Sting and Bandai. In 2006 Atlus USA and Sting released Yggdra Union, a strategy role-playing game (RPG) for the Game Boy Advance. After Working Designs' publication of Growlanser Generations, it released Growlanser: Heritage of War in 2005 and Growlanser Wayfarer of Time in 2012.

The company established an online division, including the Atlus Online portal which is servicing Neo Steam: The Shattered Continent and Shin Megami Tensei: Imagine. On 31 March 2013, Index Digital Media's Atlus Online Division was purchased by Marvelous AQL and transferred to Xseed Games. Atlus USA has published games under the Marl Kingdom name, beginning with Rhapsody: A Musical Adventure in 2000. On 18 February 2014 Sega announced that Index Digital Media would revert its name back to Atlus USA. In March 2016, Sega announced that all the future localized products from Atlus for North America will be published by Sega. Between 2019 and 2020, Atlus USA changed its public brand name to Atlus West.

=== Europe and Oceania ===
Until 2017, Atlus did not have a dedicated European division for publishing and distributing its titles within the European and Oceania region. Instead, many of Atlus' titles were published in these regions by Nippon Ichi Software (NIS) and its American division NIS America. Following Atlus's acquisition by Sega Sammy Holdings, NIS found that it became more difficult to work between Sega and Atlus for distribution and in April 2016, formally ended its distribution partnership with Atlus. In July 2016, Deep Silver announced that it had come to agreement to become Atlus' distributor for Europe and Oceania, and would begin to publish titles in both retail and digital form. In August 2017, Atlus announced that it had opened a European distribution team located in Sega Europe's offices in London that would publish all its games going forward.

== Corporate mascot ==
Designed by Kazuma Kaneko, Jack Frost has been Atlus' mascot since the character's inception in 1990.

Jack Frost, who appears as a demon character in the Shin Megami Tensei franchise, is the company mascot. Resembling a snowman, he has teeth, a tail and no nose, and wears a jester hat, collar, and shoes. His catchphrase is "Hee-Ho". He has appeared in several games in the Shin Megami Tensei series, as well as the Jack Bros. and Persona games. Jack Frost is a hidden character in the North American and Japanese versions of SBK: Snowboard Kids, with a larger role in the Japanese version. He has a family; more relatives were created since Shin Megami Tensei II, including King Frost, Jack-O-Lantern (known as "Pyro Jack" in some localizations), Frost 5 Senshi, and Black Frost.

== Animation based on Atlus games ==
- Shin Megami Tensei: Tokyo Mokushiroku
- Shin Megami Tensei: Devil Summoner (TV Series)
- Shin Megami Tensei: Devil Children
- Shin Megami Tensei: Devil Children 2 Light & Dark
- Devil Survivor 2: The Animation
- Persona: Trinity Soul
- Persona 4: The Animation
- Persona 4: The Golden Animation
- Persona 3 The Movie: #1 Spring of Birth
- Persona 3 The Movie: #2 Midsummer Knight's Dream
- Persona 3 The Movie: #3 Falling Down
- Persona 3 The Movie: #4 Winter of Rebirth
- Persona 5: The Animation – The Day Breakers
- Persona 5: The Animation
