= List of PC games (J) =

The following page is an alphabetical section from the list of PC games.

== J ==
Name	Developer	Publisher	Genre(s)	Operating system(s)	Date released
Jack Orlando	Toontraxx	TopWare Interactive	Adventure	Microsoft Windows, MS-DOS	September 1, 2001
Jagged Alliance	Madlab Software	Sir-Tech	Tactical role-playing, turn-based tactics	MS-DOS	April 1995
Jagged Alliance: Deadly Games	Sir-Tech	Sir-Tech	Tactical role-playing, turn-based tactics	DOS	September 12, 1996
Jagged Alliance 2	Sir-Tech Canada	TalonSoft	Tactical role-playing, turn-based tactics	Microsoft Windows, Linux, OS X	April 19, 1999
Jagged Alliance: Back in Action	Coreplay, Bigmoon Studios	bitComposer / Kalypso Media	Turn-based tactics, Real-time tactics	Microsoft Windows, Linux, macOS	February 9, 2012
Jagged Alliance: Flashback	Full Control	Full Control	Turn-based tactics	Microsoft Windows, Linux, OS X	October 21, 2014
Hired Guns: The Jagged Edge	GFI Russia	Tri Synergy / Matrix Games	Turn-based tactics	Microsoft Windows	October 19, 2007
Jagged Alliance 3	Haemimont Games	THQ Nordic	Tactical role-playing, turn-based tactics	Microsoft Windows	July 14, 2023
Jade Empire	BioWare, LTI Gray Matter	2K Games, Valve	Action role-playing	Microsoft Windows, macOS	February 26, 2007
James Bond 007: Nightfire	Eurocom, Gearbox Software, TransGaming Inc.	Electronic Arts, Aspyr	First-person shooter	Microsoft Windows, macOS	November 28, 2002
Jazz Jackrabbit	Epic MegaGames, Arjan Brussee	Epic MegaGames	Side-scrolling shooter, platform	Microsoft Windows, MS-DOS	July 30, 1994
Jazz Jackrabbit 2	Orange Games, Epic MegaGames	Gathering of Developers	Side-scrolling shooter, platform	Microsoft Windows, macOS	April 13, 1998
Jeepney Simulator	Spacezero Interactive	Spacezero Interactive	Simulator, Driving game, Indie game	Microsoft Windows	September 16, 2023
Jets'n'Guns	Rake in Grass	Rake in Grass	Scrolling shooter	Microsoft Windows, Mac OS X, Linux	November 17, 2004
Jets'n'Guns 2	Rake in Grass	Rake in Grass	Scrolling shooter	Microsoft Windows	July 24, 2020
Jill of the Jungle	Epic MegaGames	Epic MegaGames	Platform	DOS	June 1992
John Madden Football (1988)	Robin Antonick; John Friedman (MS-DOS); Rob Johnson (Commodore); Bethesda Softworks	Electronic Arts	Sports	Commodore 64/Commodore 128, Apple II, MS-DOS	June 1, 1988
John Madden Football (1990)	Park Place Productions	EA Sports	Sports	Amiga	May 1992
John Madden Football II	D.C. True, Ltd,	Electronic Arts	Sports	DOS	1991
John Wick Hex	Bithell Games	Good Shepherd Entertainment (2019–2024); Big Fan Games (2024–)	Tactical role-playing	Microsoft Windows, macOS	October 8, 2019
Judge Dredd: Dredd vs. Death	Rebellion Developments	Sierra Entertainment, BAM! Entertainment	First-person shooter	Microsoft Windows	October 17, 2003
Judgment	Ryu Ga Gotoku Studio	SEGA	Action-adventure	Microsoft Windows	September 14, 2022
Juiced 2: Hot Import Nights	Paradigm Entertainment	THQ	Racing	Microsoft Windows	November 16, 2007
Jump King	Nexile	Nexile, Ukiyo Publishing	Platform	Microsoft Windows	May 3, 2019
Jurassic Park	Ocean Software	Ocean Software	Action	Amiga, DOS	October 1993
Jurassic Park III: Danger Zone!	Knowledge Adventure	Knowledge Adventure	Action, adventure	Microsoft Windows	June 29, 2001
Jurassic Park III: Dino Defender	Knowledge Adventure	Knowledge Adventure	Side-scrolling, action	Microsoft Windows, macOS	June 29, 2001
Jurassic Park: The Game	Telltale Games	Telltale Games	Graphic adventure	Microsoft Windows, macOS	November 15, 2011
Jurassic World Evolution	Frontier Developments	Frontier Developments	Business simulation	Microsoft Windows	June 12, 2018
Jurassic World Evolution 2	Frontier Developments	Frontier Developments	Business simulation	Microsoft Windows	November 9, 2021
Just Cause	Avalanche Studios	Eidos Interactive	Open world, action	Microsoft Windows	September 22, 2006
Just Cause 2	Avalanche Studios	Eidos Interactive	Open world, action	Microsoft Windows	March 23, 2010
Just Cause 3	Avalanche Studios	Square Enix	Open world, action	Microsoft Windows	December 1, 2015
Just Cause 4	Avalanche Studios	Square Enix	Open world, action	Microsoft Windows	December 4, 2018
