= Tactical role-playing game =

Video game subgenre

A Tactical role-playing game (abbreviated Tactical RPG), also known as strategy role-playing game or simulation RPG (Note: Japanese: シミュレーションRPG, Hepburn: Shimyurēshon RPG) (both abbreviated SRPG), is a video game genre that combines core elements of role-playing video games with those of tactical (turn-based or real-time) strategy video games. The formats of tactical RPGs are much like traditional tabletop role-playing games and strategy games in appearance, pacing, and rule structure. Likewise, early tabletop role-playing games are descended from skirmish wargames such as Chainmail, which were primarily concerned with combat.

== Game design ==
This subgenre of role-playing video games principally refers to games which incorporate elements from strategy video games as an alternative to traditional role-playing game (RPG) systems. Like standard RPGs, the player typically controls a finite party and battles a similar number of enemies. Like other RPGs, death is usually temporary, but this genre incorporates strategic gameplay such as tactical movement on an isometric grid. Unlike traditional RPGs which are traditionally single-player, some tactical RPGs feature multiplayer play, such as Final Fantasy Tactics: The War of the Lions.

A distinct difference between tactical RPGs and traditional RPGs is the lack of exploration; for instance, Final Fantasy Tactics does away with the third-person exploration of towns and dungeons that is typical in a Final Fantasy game. Instead of exploration, there is an emphasis on battle strategy. Players are able to build and train characters to use in battle, utilizing different classes, including warriors and magic users, depending on the game. Characters normally gain experience points from battle and grow stronger, and are awarded secondary experience points which can be used to advance in specific character classes. Battles have specific winning conditions, such as defeating all enemies or surviving a certain number of turns, that the player must accomplish before the next map will become available. In between battles, players can access their characters to equip them, change classes, train them, depending on the game.

== History ==
A number of early role-playing video games used a tactical form of combat, such as Tunnels of Doom (1982) and Ultima III: Exodus (1983), as well as The Dragon and Princess (1982) and Bokosuka Wars (1983), which introduced party-based, tiled combat to America and Japan, respectively. Further, tactical RPGs are descendants of tabletop role-playing games and wargames, such as Dungeons & Dragons and Chainmail, which were mainly tactical in their original form. (Note: Delving even further, one finds that wargames such as Kriegspiel and Chainmail are themselves descendants of traditional ancient strategy games such as chess and chaturanga.) Nevertheless, much of the development of tactical RPGs has diverged on each side of the Pacific, and the term "tactical RPG" is sometimes reserved only for those titles that were created in Japan.

=== 8-bit origins in Japan (1982–1990) ===
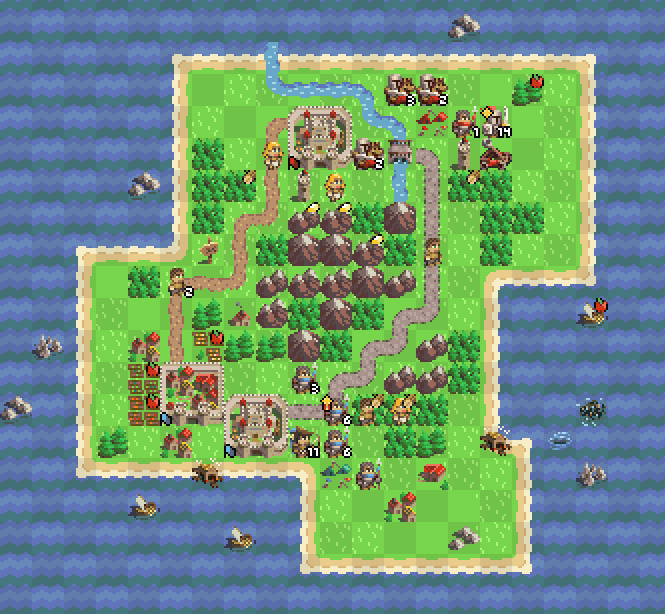
Tactical role-playing games often involve moving troops turn by turn across a map to defeat foes or capture territory, as depicted similarly in this illustration.

One of the earliest Japanese RPGs, Koei's The Dragon and Princess, was released on NEC's PC-8001 home computer platform in 1982. This game can also be considered a precursor to the tactical RPG genre. It used a combat system where, following a random encounter, the game transitioned to a separate, graphical, overhead battle screen, and tactical turn-based combat ensued. That same year, Tunnels of Doom used a similar combat system, as did Ultima III: Exodus released in 1983.

During the 8-bit era, Bokosuka Wars, a computer game developed by Koji Sumii for the Sharp X1 in 1983 and ported to the Nintendo Entertainment System (NES) by ASCII in 1985, was responsible for laying the foundations for the tactical RPG genre, or "simulation RPG" genre as it is known in Japan, with its blend of role-playing and strategy game elements. The game revolves around a king who must recruit soldiers and lead his army against overwhelming enemy forces, while each unit gains experience and levels up along the way. It is also considered to be an early prototype real-time strategy game.

Another notable early example of the genre was Kure Software Koubou's 1988 PC-8801 strategy RPG, Silver Ghost, which was cited by Camelot Software Planning's Hiroyuki Takahashi as inspiration for the Shining series of tactical RPGs. According to Takahashi, Silver Ghost was a simulation action type of game where the players had to direct, oversee and command multiple characters. Unlike later tactical RPGs, however, Silver Ghost was not turn-based, but instead used real-time strategy and action role-playing game elements. It also featured a point-and-click interface, to control the characters using a cursor. A similar game released by Kure Software Koubo that same year was First Queen, a unique hybrid between a real-time strategy, action RPG, and strategy RPG. Like an RPG, the player can explore the world, purchase items, and level up, and like a strategy video game, it focuses on recruiting soldiers and fighting against large armies rather than small parties. The game's "Gochyakyara" ("Multiple Characters") system let the player control one character at a time while the others are controlled by computer AI that follow the leader, and where battles are large-scale with characters sometimes filling an entire screen. Master of Monsters, developed by SystemSoft and released in 1989 for the MSX2, added fantasy characters and magic attacks to the gameplay of the wartime combat Daisenryaku series, which had instead opted for tanks, planes, and other vehicles of real-world modern combat. Master of Monsters also added experience bars for the character units, a concept which would be adapted and popularized by later console-based series like Fire Emblem. Unlike many other early titles in the genre, Master of Monsters made its way to the west via a port to the Sega Genesis in 1991, albeit only in North America.

However, the genre did not become prolific until Nintendo published the game that set the template for tactical wargame RPGs, Fire Emblem: Ankoku Ryū to Hikari no Tsurugi. Developed by Intelligent Systems and released exclusively in Japan for the Nintendo Famicom in 1990, Fire Emblem would become an archetype for the whole genre, establishing gameplay elements that are still used in tactical RPGs today, though many of these elements were influenced by earlier RPGs and strategy games. Combining the basic concepts from games like Dragon Quest and simple turn-based strategy elements that the development team gained experience with in their 1988 release Famicom Wars, Intelligent Systems created a hit, which spawned many sequels and imitators. It introduced unique features such as how the characters were not interchangeable pawns but each of them were unique, in terms of both class and stats, and how a character who runs out of hit points would usually remain dead forever. The latter mechanic was used to introduce a non-linear storyline to the genre, where different multiple endings are possible depending on which characters are alive or dead, a concept still used in recent games such as Shin Megami Tensei: Devil Survivor, and Final Promise Story. It was not until the release of Fire Emblem: The Blazing Blade for the Game Boy Advance, many years later, that the series was introduced to Western gamers, who until then were more familiar with localized precursors like Nobunaga's Ambition, as well as later tactical RPGs partially influenced by Fire Emblem, including the Shining and Ogre series and Final Fantasy Tactics, and Nippon Ichi games like Disgaea.

=== Eastern console history (1991–present) ===
==== 16-bit consoles ====
During the 16-bit generation, among the first imitators was Langrisser by NCS/Masaya, first released for the Mega Drive / Genesis in 1991. It was translated for North American release and retitled Warsong. The Langrisser series differed from Fire Emblem in that it used a general-soldier structure instead of controlling main characters. Langrisser, too, spawned many sequels, none of which were brought to North America. Langrisser set itself apart from other tactical RPGs in its time with larger-scale battles, where the player could control over thirty units at one time and fight against scores of enemies. Since Der Langrisser in 1994, the series offered non-linear branching paths and multiple endings. The player's choices and actions affected which of four different paths they followed, either aligning themselves with one of three different factions or fighting against all of them. Each of the four paths leads to a different ending and there are over 75 possible scenarios. Langrisser III introduced a relationship system similar to dating sims. Depending on the player's choices and actions, the feelings of the female allies will change towards the player character, who will end up with the female ally he is closest with.

Master of Monsters was a unique title by SystemSoft. Where Langrisser and Fire Emblem used a square-based grid, Master of Monsters used a hexagonal grid. Players could choose one of four different Lords to defend their Towers and areas on the grid by building an army of creatures to destroy the opposing armies. This game had a sequel for the PlayStation called Master of Monsters: Disciples of Gaia, which had limited success and was criticized for its slow gameplay. Both Warsong and Master of Monsters were cited as the inspirations behind the 2005 turn-based strategy computer RPG, The Battle for Wesnoth.

The first game in the long-running Super Robot Wars series is another early example of the genre, initially released for the Game Boy in 1991.

Another influential early tactical RPG was Sega's Shining Force for the Sega Genesis, which was released in 1992. Shining Force used even more console RPG elements than earlier games, allowing the player to walk around towns and talk to people and buy weapons. It spawned sequels, Shining Force II for Sega Genesis and Shining Force CD for Sega CD, besides the Shining Force Gaiden 1, 2 and 3 for Sega Game Gear and Shining Force III for Sega Saturn. The game's creator, Camelot Software Planning's Hiroyuki Takahashi, cited Kure Software Koubou's 1988 tactical RPG, Silver Ghost, as his inspiration. One game released solely in Japan for the Super Nintendo Entertainment System (SNES), Bahamut Lagoon, began Square's (now Square Enix) famous line of tactical RPGs.

Four games from the Ogre Battle series have been released in North America. The first was Ogre Battle: March of the Black Queen was released for the SNES in 1993 and was more of a real-time strategy RPG in which the player forms character parties that are moved around a map in real-time. When two parties meet, the combat plays out with minimal user interaction. The game is notable for introducing a moral alignment system that not only affects the gameplay but where tactical and strategic decisions influence the outcome of a non-linear branching storyline, which is affected by factors such as the moral alignments of the troops used to liberate a city, whether to keep certain liberated cities guarded, making popular or unpopular decisions, concentrating power among just a few units, making deals with thieves, and a general sense of justice. These factors lead to one of 13 possible endings, alongside other factors such as how many and which units are used, how battles are fought, the army's reputation, player character's alignment and charisma, and secrets discovered.

The sequel, Tactics Ogre: Let Us Cling Together, was originally a 1995 SNES game that was not released outside Japan. It was later ported to the PlayStation, along with Ogre Battle: March of the Black Queen. Both of the PlayStation re-releases were marketed in North America by Atlus, as was Ogre Battle 64: Person of Lordly Caliber for the Nintendo 64. Tactics Ogre's gameplay is more similar to the genre of tactical RPGs that Final Fantasy Tactics belongs to (which was developed by former members of Quest and created/written/directed by Yasumi Matsuno), complete with battles taking place on isometric grids. It was also the first to bear the name "Tactics" in the title, a term gamers would come to associate with the genre. Not only are characters moved individually on a grid, but the view is isometric, and the order of combat is calculated for each character individually. The game also expanded the non-linear alignment system of its predecessor, with three types of alignments for each unit: Lawful, Neutral, and Chaos, neither of which are portrayed as necessarily good or bad. The game gives players the freedom to choose their own destiny, with difficult moral decisions, such as whether to follow a Lawful path by upholding the oath of loyalty and slaughter civilian non-player characters on the leader's command, or follow the chaotic path by following a personal sense of justice and rebelling, or instead follow a more neutral path. Such factors affect the game's ending, which is also affected by decisions such as whether to obtain the most powerful class, which can only be acquired by making a tragic sacrifice. Another feature was "Warren's Report", a type of database on the land, people, encounters and races of Valeria (similar to, but much more expansive than, the troves of knowledge in Mass Effect). Although this game defined the genre in many ways, it was not widely recognized by American gamers because it was released to American audiences several years later. Final Fantasy Tactics shared some staff members with Tactics Ogre and shares many of its gameplay elements. A prequel to the original Tactics Ogre, Tactics Ogre: The Knight of Lodis, was later released for the Game Boy Advance. A remake of Let Us Cling Together was later released for the PSP in 2011.

In 1996, the tactical role-playing game Fire Emblem: Genealogy of the Holy War also featured a non-linear branching storyline, but instead of using an alignment system, it used a relationship system resembling dating sims that gave players the ability to affect the relationship points between different units/characters. This in turn affected both the gameplay and storyline, with the different possible relationships in the first generation of the game's plot leading to different units/characters appearing during the second generation, ultimately leading to different possible outcomes to the storyline.

==== 32-bit consoles ====
Isometric graphics of Front Mission. The character's movement range is indicated in blue. Some terrain objects such as trees block movement. The terrain also shows a noticeable variation in height at different places.

The 32-bit era saw many influential tactical RPGs, such as Konami's 1996 Vandal Hearts series, which feature branching storylines that can be altered by the player's dialogue choices that lead to different endings, as well as Sega's 1997 Shining Force 3, SCEI's Arc the Lad Collection (1996–1999), and Square's 1997 Final Fantasy Tactics and 1999 Front Mission 3. Konami's Vandal Hearts was an early PlayStation title that helped popularize tactical RPGs in the US. It was released by Konami and featured a 3D isometric map that could be rotated by the player. A sequel was subsequently released, also for the PlayStation.

One of the first 32-bit tactical RPGs, Guardian War, was developed by Micro Cabin and released in 1993 on the Panasonic 3DO. While the game lacked in story, it included many game mechanics that are seen throughout many of the 32-bit tactical RPGs; like isometric camera rotation, interchangeable and hybridization of "jobs" or "classes" for each character, the combination of moves between characters, and the capture of NPCs and having them play on your side.

Sega's Sakura Wars, released for the Sega Saturn in 1996, combined tactical RPG combat with dating sim and visual novel elements, introducing a real-time branching choice system where, during an event or conversation, the player must choose an action or dialogue choice within a time limit, or not to respond at all within that time. The player's choice, or lack thereof, affects the player character's relationship with other characters and in turn the characters' performance in battle, the direction of the storyline, and the ending. Later games in the series added several variations, including an action gauge that can be raised up or down depending on the situation, and a gauge that the player can manipulate using the analog stick depending on the situation. The success of Sakura Wars led to a wave of games that combine the RPG and dating sim genres, including Thousand Arms in 1998, Riviera: The Promised Land in 2002, and Luminous Arc in 2007.

Final Fantasy Tactics was arguably the most responsible for bringing tactical RPGs to North America. Developed by former employees of Quest, the developer responsible for the Ogre Battle series, it combined many elements of the Final Fantasy series with Tactics Ogre-style gameplay. It also expanded on the isometric grid combat of Tactics Ogre by allowing players to freely rotate the camera around the battlefield rather than keeping the camera in a fixed position. The storyline of Final Fantasy Tactics was also more linear than its predecessor, in order to provide a deeper epic narrative. Thanks to Hiroyuki Ito, lead designer on the game, it also successfully implemented a modified job system, previously used in Final Fantasy V, which allowed the player to change a unit's character class at any time during the game and learn new abilities from job points earned with each class. The game was acclaimed for both its highly tactical gameplay and its well-written storyline that touches on issues such as class, privilege, religion, and politics. The game's reputation led to other developers adding the word "Tactics" to their titles to indicate the tactical RPG genre. It was later ported to the PSP as Final Fantasy Tactics: The War of the Lions and is still regarded as one of the greatest tactical RPGs of all time.

==== Sixth generation ====
On sixth-generation consoles, an American fan-base has been established by Nippon Ichi, makers of the PlayStation 2 games La Pucelle: Tactics, Phantom Brave, and Disgaea: Hour of Darkness. Of these games, Disgaea has been the most successful to date, and was the second Nippon Ichi game released in North America, the first being Rhapsody: A Musical Adventure (published by Atlus). Throughout this generation, companies have noticed the large audience and popularity of these types of games, particularly Atlus and Nintendo. La Pucelle: Tactics and Disgaea: Hour of Darkness, which Atlus re-released due to high demand, have become big hits for the PlayStation 2.

In 2001, Sakura Wars 3 for the Dreamcast introduced a new combat system that incorporates action elements, and abandons the use of grids in favour of allowing each character to move around freely across the battlefield but with a limited number of moves each turn illustrated using a bar at the bottom of the screen. This type of combat system would later be the basis for the combat system in Valkyria Chronicles, developed by much of the same team in 2008. The Sakura Wars series would not be released in the West until the fifth game, Sakura Wars: So Long, My Love (2005). The Front Mission series also continued on to the PlayStation 2, with Front Mission 4 and 5, the latter of which never saw a Western release, but a fan translation.

The Game Boy Advance would also see the release of Rebelstar: Tactical Command (2005) by X-COM creators, Nick and Julian Gollop. The game would be highly praised for adapting the combat mechanics of the highly detailed and acclaimed PC strategy series, but would also receive criticism for sub-par presentation, a lackluster storyline, and lack of link-mode support. The game ended up receiving an average score of 77.83% at GameRankings. In early 2006, Idea Factory's Blazing Souls featured nonlinear gameplay that allows the player to progress through the game and the story in whatever order they wish. In addition, instead of having separate screens or maps for exploration and battle, the game features a seamless transition between exploration and battle. This time period also saw the Western debut of Fire Emblem in Fire Emblem: The Blazing Blade (simply titled Fire Emblem outside Japan).

==== Seventh generation ====
On seventh-generation consoles, Sega's Valkyria Chronicles (2008) for the PlayStation 3 utilizes the seventh-generation console processing power by using a distinctive anime/watercolor art style, as well as incorporating third-person tactical shooter elements. After selecting a character in the overhead map view, the player manually controls him/her from a third-person view. This mechanic allows for, among others: free movement to a certain range, manual aiming with extra damage for headshots, a limited cover system, and real-time hazards, such as interception fire and landmines. The game has been described as "the missing link between Final Fantasy Tactics and Full Spectrum Warrior".

In 2004, Konami released Metal Gear Acid, which combined the stealth game elements of the Metal Gear series with turn-based tactical RPG gameplay of games like Fire Emblem, Final Fantasy Tactics, and Disgaea, along with the random-draw, forethought and resource management appeal of card battles like in Konami's own Yu-Gi-Oh! games (1999 onwards). Developer Kuju Entertainment released Dungeons & Dragons Tactics for the PlayStation Portable in 2007. The game intended to adapt the rules and mechanics of the popular table-top role-playing game, Dungeons & Dragons, but suffered from a poor interface and awkward camera controls.

The Atlus title Shin Megami Tensei: Devil Survivor (2009) blended together both traditional and tactical RPG gameplay along with non-linear adventure game elements. It also featured an innovative demon auction system and a death clock system where each character has a specified time of death, with the player's actions and choices having consequences on who lives and dies. Infinite Space (2009) by PlatinumGames, for the Nintendo DS, is a hybrid of tactical role-playing, real-time strategy and space simulator elements, and features a non-linear branching narrative with numerous choices that can have dramatic consequences, and an epic scale spanning hundreds of planets.

Radiant Historia, released by Atlus for the Nintendo DS in 2010, combined the gameplay of traditional RPG titles with a highly tactical grid combat system, with several unique features such as a queue allowing party members to switch turns and perform combo attacks when near each other on the queue, and the manipulation of enemy positions by knocking a target onto another grid space and attack multiple targets when enemies fall onto the same grid space. The game is most notable for its unique take on the concept of non-linear branching storylines, which it combines with the concepts of time travel and parallel universes, expanding on the Chrono series. Radiant Historia takes it much further by giving players the freedom to travel backwards and forwards through a timeline to alter the course of history, with each of their choices and actions having a major effect on the timeline. The player can return to certain points in history and live through certain events again to make different choices and see different possible outcomes on the timeline. The player can also travel back and forth between two parallel timelines, and can obtain many possible parallel endings. Square Enix's PSP version of Tactics Ogre: Let Us Cling Together, released around the same time, featured a similar "World" system that allows players to revisit key plot points and make different choices to see how the story unfolds differently.

Atlus title Growlanser IV: Wayfarer of the Time (2012) features a unique battle system that blends turn-based and real-time strategy. The player controls each character in turn, but the actions play out in real-time. Imageepoch's title Saigo no Yakusoku no Monogatari (Final Promise Story) for the PlayStation Portable has a strategic command-based battle system where enemies learn from previous skirmishes. The characters can also die permanently during gameplay which in turn affects the game's storyline.

=== Western personal computers ===
Many Western PC games have utilized this genre for years, as well. Western games tend to have stronger military themes, without many of the fantasy elements often found in their console (and mainly Japanese) counterparts, as well as greater freedom of movement when interacting with the surrounding environment. Notable examples include the Jagged Alliance series (1994-2023) and the Silent Storm series (2003-2005), with many titles owing considerably to the X-COM series (1994-2016) of strategy games. In fact, Western PC games in the genre were largely defined by X-COM in much the same way as Eastern console games were by Fire Emblem.

==== 1990s ====
Lords of Chaos (1990) came about when Julian Gollop wanted to add more role-playing elements to his 1985 video game Chaos: The Battle of Wizards, which was more of a tactical wargame. Incubation: Time Is Running Out (1997), part of the Battle Isle series, was one of the first strategy titles to use fully 3D graphics and support hardware acceleration on the 3dfx Voodoo. Other titles in the series are mainly tactical wargames featuring vehicle combat and base capturing. The game was generally well received by critics.

Gorky 17 (1999, a.k.a. Odium) is a tactical RPG by Polish developer Metropolis Software featuring elements of survival horror. It is also the first title in a series featuring the main character, Cole Sullivan. Later titles in the series were third-person shooters. The game's reception was mixed.

Vantage Master is a series of tactical RPGs similar to Master of Monsters developed and published by Nihon Falcom for Microsoft Windows, beginning in 1997. The first game in the series was never released outside Japan, South Korea and Taiwan. The latest game, Vantage Master Portable for the PSP, was released on April 24, 2008.

Jagged Alliance is a tactical turn-based RPG series developed by Sir-Tech Canada released in 1995, with a sequel released in 1999. A third game in the series, developed by Haemimont Games and published by THQ Nordic, was released in 2023.

==== 2000s ====
Silent Storm presents the player with two sets of equipped weapons, numerous stances, and several different firing modes. Terrain elevation is also completely fluid, with smooth ramps, sloping embankments, flights of stairs and ladders (not pictured).

Shadow Watch (2000) is a video game adaptation of the Tom Clancy's Power Plays novel of the same name developed by Red Storm Entertainment. It has also been compared to X-COM, though it features a different action point system and is missing the latter game's upgradable units. The game's reception was mixed.

Fallout Tactics: Brotherhood of Steel (2001) is a spin-off of the Fallout series of CRPGs by Interplay Entertainment developed by Australian company Micro Forté. Unusual for the genre is the option to choose between real-time and turn-based play, or between "Continuous Turn-Based Mode" (CTB), "Individual Turn-Based Mode" (ITB), and "Squad Turn-Based Mode" (STB) modes as the developers put it. The game even allows the player to switch modes in the middle of play. The game received generally favorable reviews from critics, though was not as well-received as the series' more traditional RPG titles.

Soldiers of Anarchy (2002) is a squad-based real-time tactics computer game by German developer Silver Style Entertainment. Gameplay involves squad tactics, vehicles and a wide variety of weapons and ammunition. The game received mixed reviews from critics.

Freedom Force (2002) and its sequel, Freedom Force vs. the Third Reich (2005) - both by Irrational Games - are two examples of comic book superhero tactical RPGs that are played in real-time instead of turns. Both games received favorable reviews from critics.

Paradise Cracked (2003), Cops 2170: The Power of Law (2005), Metalheart: Replicants Rampage (2004) and Shadow Vault (2004) are poorly received tactical RPGs by MiST Land South, Akella and Mayhem Studios of Russia and Slovakia, respectively. Paradise Cracked was inspired by cyberpunk works such as The Matrix, Blade Runner, Ghost in the Shell, and Philip K. Dick novels; and Metalheart: Replicants Rampage is a post-apocalyptic cyberpunk tactical RPG inspired by Jagged Alliance, Syndicate, and Fallout. Cops 2170: The Power of Law is set in the same "Reality 4.13" universe that first appeared in Paradise Cracked.

Hammer & Sickle (2005) is a tactical RPG co-developed by Russian companies Novik & Co and Nival Interactive, and published by CDV. It is set in the Silent Storm universe and follows the events in the main series. After this came Night Watch (2006) and its sequel, Day Watch (2007), also by Nival Interactive, but instead based on the Russian novels and films of the same name. All three games received mediocre-to-poor review scores despite utilizing the highly regarded Silent Storm engine.

Other titles inspired by Jagged Alliance include Brigade E5: New Jagged Union (2006) and its sequel, simply titled 7.62 (2007), by Russian developer Apeiron; Hired Guns: The Jagged Edge (2007) by GFI Russia; and Jagged Alliance: Back in Action by bitComposer Games. The Brigade E5 series incorporates an innovative hybrid real-time system the company calls "Smart Pause Mode" in an attempt to heighten realism; Hired Guns: The Jagged Edge began its life as Jagged Alliance 3D before Strategy First withdrew the rights to the series name; Jagged Alliance: Back in Action is a 3D, real-time remake of Jagged Alliance 2. Lastly, Jagged Alliance: Flashback was released in 2014 following a successful Kickstarter. The developer Full Control gained notoriety, however, for feuding with its backers, and the company stopped making games shortly thereafter.

Additional titles inspired by X-COM include UFO: Aftermath (2003), UFO: Aftershock (2005), UFO: Afterlight (2007) and UFO: Extraterrestrials (2007) by Czech developers ALTAR Interactive and Chaos Concept; as well as Xenonauts (2014) by Goldhawk Interactive. ALTAR's UFO series features real-time play; Chaos Concept's UFO: Extraterrestrials received only mixed reviews; and Xenonauts currently has a "Very Positive" rating on Steam. The open source, cross-platform X-COM-clone UFO: Alien Invasion is also under development.

The Battle for Wesnoth (2005) is another Master of Monsters and Warsong clone, released under an open source license for multiple platforms. It is also continually updated.

==== 2010s ====
The tactical isometric cyberpunk/fantasy RPG, Shadowrun Returns (2013), was funded via a successful crowd-sourced Kickstarter campaign that raised a total of $1.9 million for development. The game is based on the popular Shadowrun pen-and-paper setting by Jordan Weisman, and features tactical combat in a world filled with cybernetics, magic and fantasy creatures. Two sequels, Shadowrun: Dragonfall (2014) and Shadowrun: Hong Kong (2015) quickly followed. An online tactical game not directly related to the previous three games, Shadowrun Chronicles: Boston Lockdown, was released to less-than-positive reviews in 2015.

In 2014 the tactical RPG Blackguards based on the German The Dark Eye pen-and-paper setting was released to mixed or average reviews. A sequel, Blackguards 2, was released one year later. In 2014, The Banner Saga was released, the first chapter of a Tactical RPG trilogy that would lead to two sequels.

2015 saw the release of Invisible, Inc. for OS X, Windows and Linux. It has been described as a "tactical RPG that mixes stealth with procedural generation", since it introduces elements of espionage and roguelike gameplay. It received generally favorable scores from reviewers. A version for the PlayStation 4 and Nintendo Switch has been released.

In March 2017 the German indie developer Overhype Studios released its tactical RPG Battle Brothers out of Early Access to generally favorable reviews. This mercenary company simulation was described as a "cleverly constructed, carefully balanced board game".

=== Genre blurring ===
Other games combine similar mechanics, but typically belong in other genres. Tactical wargames such as the Steel Panthers series (1995–2006) sometimes combine tactical military combat with RPG-derived unit advancement. Avalon Hill's Squad Leader (2000), a man-to-man wargame utilizing the Soldiers at War engine, has also been compared (unfavorably) to X-COM and Jagged Alliance. Rebelstar (1984) and Laser Squad (1988) were precursors to X-COM created by the same developer, Julian Gollop. They did not, however, feature the statistical character development and strategic map of the later series.

Bokosuka Wars (1983), a game regarded as the progenitor of the strategy/simulation RPG genre, is also difficult to clearly define. While often referred to as a strategy/simulation RPG, it is also sometimes referred to as a prototype real-time strategy, an early reverse tower defense game, and an early action role-playing game. Nobunaga's Ambition (1983) and later Koei titles as well as Capcom's Destiny of an Emperor (1989) have blurred the line between a role-playing game, turn-based grand strategy wargame, and simulation video game. Similarly, Kure Software Koubou's Silver Ghost (1988) combined elements of both tactical RPGs and action RPGs, while Ogre Battle: March of the Black Queen (1993) blurred the line between a tactical RPG and a real-time strategy. Metal Gear Acid (2004) blurs the line between a stealth game, a genre the Metal Gear series is normally known for, along with tactical role-playing inspired by the likes of Fire Emblem and Final Fantasy Tactics, infused with card gameplay found in games like Konami's own Yu-Gi-Oh! series.

In addition to a turn-based tactical combat layer, the X-COM series also possesses a real-time 3D strategic layer, complete with global defensive map as well as a technology tree that the player must research in order to unlock new weapons and armor. Jagged Alliance 2 features a country sector map with fortified towns and roving bands of enemies that must be defeated before entering the capital city of Meduna. Knights in the Nightmare (2009) combines elements of traditional tactical RPGs with bullet hell–style shoot 'em up gameplay.

Sega's Valkyria Chronicles (2008) blurs the line even further by incorporating tactical RPG gameplay with both real-time strategy and third-person tactical shooter elements, including over-the-shoulder manual aiming and a cover system. This has led to the game being described by one source as "the missing link between Final Fantasy Tactics and Full Spectrum Warrior". In an interview with Eurogamer, X-COM developer Julian Gollop mentioned how surprised he was how close Valkyria Chronicles was in design to his cancelled game Dreamland Chronicles.

Infinite Space (2009) by PlatinumGames is a hybrid of tactical RPG, real-time strategy, and space simulator. The 3rd Birthday (2010), the third game in the Parasite Eve series, features a unique blend of action role-playing game, real-time tactical RPG, survival horror and third-person tactical shooter elements.

Dead State (2014) is a turn-based RPG developed by DoubleBear Productions and Iron Tower Studios set in a zombie apocalypse scenario. Players are tasked with leading a group of survivors living in a shelter in the fictional town of Splendid, Texas. Dead State mixes tactical combat and RPG character development with survival horror and base management elements. An "enhanced edition" was released in 2015 under the name, Dead State: Reanimated.

==== Full-fledged CRPGs ====
A number of "full-fledged" computer role-playing games could also be described as having "tactical combat". Examples from the classic era of CRPGs include parts of the aforementioned Ultima series beginning with Ultima III: Exodus (1983); SSI's Wizard's Crown (1985) and The Eternal Dagger (1987); the Realms of Arkania (1992-1996) series based on the German The Dark Eye pen-and-paper system; and the Gold Box games of the late '80s and early '90s - many of which were later ported to Japanese video game systems. Other examples include Troika Games' The Temple of Elemental Evil (2003), which features a highly accurate implementation of the Dungeons & Dragons 3.5 edition ruleset; Knights of the Chalice (2009), which implements the d20 Open Game License; and Pyrrhic Tales: Prelude to Darkness (2002), an open world RPG featuring one continuous game world. More recent examples include Wasteland 2 (2014), Divinity: Original Sin (2014) and The Age of Decadence (2015). Partly due to the success of Wasteland 2, Divinity: Original Sin, Shadowrun: Dragonfall, Blackguards and Dead State, 2014 has been labeled "the first year of the CRPG renaissance".

Tir-nan-óg (beginning in 1984) is a series of role-playing video games that premiered in Japan on the PC98 and later released for Windows. The latest title in the series is also being released for the PlayStation 2 and PSP. Heroes of Jin Yong (1996), a Chinese role-playing game based on the popular historical Wuxia novels by Jin Yong, features a number of melee and ranged kung fu skills to train and develop, as well as a grid-based battle system. A remake of the game under the title of Tale of Wuxia was released in Chinese in 2015, and later on Steam in both Chinese and English in 2016.

==== Massively multiplayer online gaming ====
Several massively multiplayer online games (MMOs) have combined multiplayer online gaming with tactical turn-based combat. Examples include, Dofus (2005), The Continuum (2008), as well as the Russian game Total Influence Online (2009). Tactica Online was a planned MMORPG that would have featured tactical combat, had development not been cancelled in 2006. Gunrox (2008), Poxnora (2006) and Wakfu (2012) are some other recent examples.

== Popularity ==
Many tactical RPGs can be both extremely time-consuming and extremely difficult. Hence, the appeal of most tactical RPGs is to the hardcore, not casual, computer and video game player. Traditionally, tactical RPGs have been quite popular in Japan but have not enjoyed the same degree of success in North America and elsewhere. However, the audience for Japanese tactical RPGs has grown substantially in the West since the mid-90s, with PS1 and PS2 titles such as Final Fantasy Tactics, Suikoden Tactics, Vanguard Bandits and Disgaea enjoying a surprising measure of popularity outside Japan. (Note: Final Fantasy Tactics for the PS1 is often considered the breakthrough title outside Japan.) Further, older Japanese tactical RPGs were also re-released via software emulation, such as Nintendo's Virtual Console for the Wii, WiiU and Nintendo 3DS, until it was later replaced with the Nintendo Classics service in 2018 before being fully discontinued in 2023, giving these games a new lease on life.

In the 2000s, some developers complained it was becoming increasingly difficult to develop games of this type (though several had been developed in Eastern Europe with limited success); and even some developers were beginning to complain about a supposed bias against turn-based systems. Reasons cited include publishers' focus on developing real-time, action-oriented games, as well as a perception that games with turn-based mechanics were "too niche" to become successful. Things have turned around in the 2010s, at least in the West. A few high-profile titles, such as 2K Games' strategy video games, XCOM: Enemy Unknown and XCOM 2 - as well as a number of Kickstarter-funded RPGs, such as Larian's Divinity: Original Sin, inXile's Wasteland 2 and Harebrained Schemes' Shadowrun Returns - were successfully developed and published in recent years, in part due to new means of funding and distributing them. According to Dan Tudge of n-Space: "The resurgence of tactical-isometric RPGs has a lot to do with accessibility. ... Changes in the ecosystem like Steam and digital distribution have made it easier than ever for developers to connect with players".

== See also ==
- History of role-playing video games
- Role-playing battle systems
- List of tactical role-playing video games
