= Jagged Alliance: Rage! =

2018 video game

- Developer: Cliffhanger Productions
- Publisher: HandyGames
- Series: Jagged Alliance
- Platforms: Windows, PlayStation 4, Xbox One
- Release: December 6, 2018
- Genre: Turn-based tactics
- Modes: Single-player, multiplayer

Jagged Alliance: Rage! is a turn-based tactics video game developed by Cliffhanger Productions and published by HandyGames for the PC, PlayStation 4, and Xbox One in December 2018. It is part of the Jagged Alliance series.

== Gameplay ==
Jagged Alliance: Rage! is a turn-based tactics game. The game takes place 20 years after Jagged Alliance. The player controls a team of mercenaries to infiltrate an island to save a fellow mercenary and to take out the island's dictator. Unlike previous games in the series, only a small group of mercenaries are available: four out of six mercenaries can be selected, all returning characters from Jagged Alliance 2. The game is also first in the series to feature survival game elements. The game features two-player co-op multiplayer.

== Release ==
Jagged Alliance: Rage! was developed by Cliffhanger Productions, a studio based in Vienna, Austria. It previously developed Jagged Alliance Online. Rage! was announced on August 14, 2018 set to be released in fall 2018 for the PC, PlayStation 4, and Xbox One. The game is published by HandyGames, part of THQ Nordic network. In September 2018, the release date was announced for September 27, 2018. On September 26, 2018, the game was delayed to December 6, 2018.

== Reception ==
Reception

Aggregate score
Aggregator	Score
Metacritic	59/100 (PC); 54/100 (PS4); 64/100 (Xbox One)

Review scores
Publication	Score
4Players	58/100
GameStar	69/100
GamingBolt	5/10
Multiplayer.it	4.0/10
Pelaaja	5/10
Strategy Gamer	4/5
Vandal	6/10

Jagged Alliance: Rage! received "mixed or average" reviews according to review aggregator website Metacritic.

Corey Gavaza of GamingBolt summarized: "This is a game that could have benefited greatly from another year or so in development. What is here is fun but it's brought down by technical issues and strange gameplay elements."

Saúl González of Vandal said: "This classic franchise is back with good ideas and a poor execution. If you are a hardcore fan of the series or you're planning on playing with friends, have a look at it. If not, better look elsewhere."

Chris Bratt of Rock Paper Shotgun summarized: "[...] I found Rage pretty hard work to enjoy. Much like the mercs themselves, for every positive trait it may offer, there tends to be some frustrating problem to deal with too."

Martynas Klimas of Strategy Gamer said: "Jagged Alliance: Rage! Is the closest thing we have to the greatness of Jagged Alliance 2. It's a very trimmed game, delivering the experience rather than a carbon copy of the series. You still have to care for your mercs' health and gear, as well as carrying capacity, but at a much less grognardy level."

Multiplayer.it included the game on their "worst games of 2018" list.
