= Archibald's Adventures =

2009 video game

- Developer: Rake in Grass
- Platforms: iOS, Windows, Mac OS, Palm OS, Windows Mobile, PlayStation Portable, PS3
- Release: 2009
- Genre: Action puzzle game

Archibald's Adventures is an action puzzle video game developed by independent developer Rake in Grass. It was originally released in 2009.

== Background ==
Prior to this game, indie developer Rake in Grass was predominantly known "for their horror-action PC title Larva Mortus, an enjoyable mashup of games like SmashTV and Diablo".

== Plot ==
In the game, Archie and a crazy professor named Klumpfus are trapped within the professor's mansion after his latest scientific experiment went wrong, causing bizarre lifeforms to escape and roam free. In addition to this, the central computer has become paranoid and locked both the protagonists up.

== Gameplay ==
The player must help Archie overcome the pitfalls within Klumpfus' mansion in over 190 levels.

== Reception ==
Reception

Review scores
Publication	Score
Destructoid	8 (Great)
148Apps	5/5
What'sOnIphone	5/5
Slide to Play	4 out of 4
PSP Minis	9.5 out of 10
Pocket Gamer	9 out of 10
PlayStation LifeStyle.net	9 out of 10
AppVee	4 out of 5
PSNStores	3/5

TouchArcade wrote "Anyone who longs for a platformer with a little more to offer than the typical jump-stomp-run experience would do well to have a look at Rake in Grass' iPhone offering." 148Apps said "This is a game that you will love if you have any platform gaming experience but also young gamers new to the style. The character is cute and the levels, though simple in their design keep you wondering what's next. You won't be able to put this game down." SlideToPlay said "Archibald's Adventures is a long and addictive game that's greater than the sum of its parts." PSPMinis wrote "If you are looking for a great puzzle game and with over 180 challenging levels across 12 different chapters Archibald's Adventures is a game that should be in everybody's game library." Pocket Gamer said "Archibald's Adventures is puzzle-cum-platforming at its best, serving up a Titantic-sized quest that's as endearing as it is extensive." PlayStationLifeStyle wrote "Overall, Archibald's Adventures is quite simply brilliant value for money. The seamless mix of platforming and puzzle solving makes for a refreshing take on an aged genre and its plethora of levels certainly helps it stand out among the more basic of minis."

Destructoid said "There's nothing terribly complex or fancy about Archibald's Adventures. It's just a purely enjoyable game, and the first we've really enjoyed on the device since we reviewed another platformer, Rolando." PSN Stores wrote "With only one way to play, the game relies on the strength of its level design and puzzles. They're both pretty good, don't get me wrong, but I have a tough time playing this game for more than 3 consecutive levels. After that, either my eyelids start drooping or I get the itch to dodge some coconuts or play something else." TechnologyTell said "If platforming is your genre, then Archibald's Adventures is one that you do want to go on." What'sOnIphone said " This game will make you think so hard that every time that incandescent lamp above your head lights up and you've finally found a way to slay the dragon...you just can't help but pat yourself at the back or high-five with the person sitting next to you in that seminar on goal-keeping you've been looking forward to, until you picked up Archibald's Adventures, that is." AppVee said "Archibald's Adventures is one of the most solid platform games we've seen so far for the iPhone and iPod Touch." AppSafari wrote
