= Alfa: Antiterror =

2005 video game

- Alfa Antiterror box art
- Developer: MiST Land South
- Publishers: GFI/Russobit-M, Russia
- Platform: Windows
- Release: January 20, 2005
- Genre: Strategy
- Modes: Single-player, multiplayer

Alfa: Antiterror (Russian: Альфа: Антитеррор) is a strategy video game created by Russian developer MiST Land South and published by Game Factory Interactive in Russia on January 20, 2005. In the same year, the North American company Strategy First published the game as well. The story of the game follows the Russian Alpha Group in the Soviet period. The player guides the actions of an elite squad to fight terrorism. Many missions in the game are based on historical events.

A standalone expansion pack "Alfa: Anti-Terror - Men's Work" was released the same year, with a new campaign called "White Collar" focused entirely on the second Chechen War instead of the base game's varied conflicts. The English version of the game is actually Men's Work with only the White Collar campaign, expanded multiplayer and mid-mission saves and is lacking the base game's campaign.

== Gameplay ==
Alfa: Antiterror is a turn-based combat simulator.

The missions in the original game cover Russian history from 1984 to 1991. Examples of missions include rescuing Russian prisoners of war in Afghanistan and battling rebels in the Chechnya. The player controls 16 Alpha Group commandos. The game has a multiplayer component that allows players to battle both as against Western units such as Delta Force, GSG 9, and Special Air Service. Multiplayer mode can accommodate up to eight players.

== Reception ==
IGN and GameSpot both favorably compared the game to the XCOM and Jagged Alliance series. They also praised the game for its graphics and for the expansive environments in which missions take place.
