= Jagged Alliance: Deadly Games =

1996 video game

- Developer: Sir-Tech
- Publishers: NA: Sir-Tech; EU: Virgin Interactive
- Producer: Ian Currie
- Designers: Ian Currie; Linda Currie; Shaun Lyng; Alex Meduna
- Programmers: Ian Currie; Alex Meduna
- Artist: Jennifer Hamilton
- Writer: Shaun Lyng
- Composers: Guido Henkel; Steve Wener
- Series: Jagged Alliance
- Platform: MS-DOS
- Release: NA: September 12, 1996; EU: 1996
- Genres: Tactical role-playing, turn-based tactics
- Modes: Single-player, multiplayer

Jagged Alliance: Deadly Games is a tactical role-playing game developed and published by Sir-Tech as a sequel to Jagged Alliance. It was released in 1996 for MS-DOS.

== Gameplay ==
In Deadly Games, the player takes a group of mercenaries through a series of missions. The missions are linked chronologically, removing the need for micro-management on a strategic map. The scenario branches somewhat depending on the player's successes and failures. There are multiple terrain types, the mercenaries are hired and fired between missions, and Micky, the first equipment trader of the series, offers his services; for example, he may occasionally sell the player junk equipment, thereby prompting the mercs to voice their displeasure with the deal. The game features the same engine and top-down perspective as the original game. The scenario missions place the player under orders of soldier of fortune Gus Tarballs. Initially, they do not appear connected, however, the ultimate objective is to annihilate the DfK, an organisation attempting to launch satellites in space for destructive use. Non-scenario missions are also under the orders of Tarballs.

The most innovative aspects of Deadly Games include a wide variety of special ops mission types like hostage rescues, demolition and infiltration missions. It featured turn limits and a boosted artificial intelligence (AI) as well as networked multiplayer capabilities. The integrated scenario and campaign editors allow for the creation of custom strategic scenarios, adding to the replay value. Mercenary weapons can be modified by adding scopes, Suppressors and barrel extenders. Heavier equipment such as Grenade launchers and mortars are available as well.

== Development ==
In July 1996, Sir-Tech announced that Deadly Games would appear on the Total Entertainment Network multiplayer service.

GOG.com released an emulated version for Microsoft Windows in 2008.

== Reception ==
Reception

Review scores
Publication	Score
Computer Gaming World	4/5
PC Zone	79/100
PC Magazine	4/5
Computer Games Strategy Plus	4/5
PC Games	B+

Like its predecessor, Deadly Games was a commercial success. William R. Trotter of PC Gamer US wrote that it "sold very well", while Jagged Alliance designer Ian Currie called it "hugely successful".

Deadly Games was a runner-up for Computer Game Entertainment's 1996 "Best Strategy Game" prize, which ultimately went to Civilization II. The editors called Deadly Games "an excellent expansion pack".

== Reviews ==
- Australian Realms #30
