= Westbang =

2000 video game

- App logo
- Developer: Rake in Grass
- Publisher: Rake in Grass
- Platforms: Windows, iOS
- Release: Windows: CZ: 13 March 2000; iOS: WW: 22 May 2009
- Genre: Shoot 'em up
- Mode: Single-player

Westbang is a Wild West-themed shoot 'em up based on the 1984 Sega arcade video game Bank Panic. Originally released in 2000 for Microsoft Windows as shareware, an iOS version was published in 2009.

== Gameplay ==
Outlaws trying to rob the bank

The sheriff of an American frontier town has been killed by a robber gang, so the player has been appointed as the new sheriff and has to protect the town's bank from the robbers. The bank has three or four doors that open randomly and show either outlaws or customers. The player has to make sure that they only shoot the outlaws. There are also western draws. The player can only shoot when the criminal draws first. There are 25 levels and new types of outlaws on each one.

== Reception ==
Matt Fox, of App Advice, said that the game is entertaining, addicting, and worth people's money. Torbjorn Kamblad, of TouchGen, said that he liked the game even though it offered nothing new compared to the many other shooting gallery games for the iPhone.
