= Hired Guns: The Jagged Edge =

2007 video game

- European cover art
- Developer: GFI Russia
- Publishers: RU: GFI / Russobit-M; EU: Peter Games; EU: Kalypso Media; NA: Tri Synergy / Matrix Games
- Director: Witalij Schutow
- Designer: Max Tumin
- Programmer: Leonard Wolik
- Writer: Alexander Schatrow
- Platform: Windows
- Release: RU: October 19, 2007; EU: March 20, 2008; NA: December 4, 2008; UK: May 22, 2009
- Genre: Turn-based tactics
- Mode: Single-player

Hired Guns: The Jagged Edge (Russian: Джаз: Работа по найму, romanized: Dzhaz: Rabota po naymu, lit. 'Jazz: Employment') is a turn-based tactics video game developed by GFI Russia and published by GFI / Russobit-M for Windows in October 2007. The game has been called a spiritual successor to the Jagged Alliance series.

== Gameplay ==
Hired Guns is a turn-based tactics game. The player is in command of an elite unit of mercenaries in an attempt to depose an African dictator in a fictional country of Diamond Coast. The player hires and equips a group of mercenaries before starting a mission. They are used in tactical battles to capture areas that generate income. In battle, action points (AP) are used for movement and shooting. The game also has a stamina system where running or carrying extra weight depletes the stamina meter and a character will collapse if it empties.

== Development ==
In June 2004, Strategy First and Game Factory Interactive (GFI) announced a deal to develop Jagged Alliance 3D and Jagged Alliance 3 with Russian-based developer MiST Land South working on the games. In September 2005, GFI lost the rights to develop Jagged Alliance 3. In January 2006, the development agreement was terminated but GFI was still under contract to develop Jagged Alliance 3D. In August 2006, GFI dissolved MiST Land South and merged it with itself. In September 2006, GFI also lost the rights to publish Jagged Alliance 3D. A few days later GFI announced that it would release the game with a new title. In November 2006, the game was renamed to Jazz: Hired Guns. On August 10, 2007, the game was given the English title Hired Guns: The Jagged Edge. The game was showcased at Games Convention 2007. It was released in Russia on October 19, 2007, and in other mainland European countries on March 20, 2008. Tri Synergy and Matrix Games released the game in North America on December 4, 2008. The game was released in the United Kingdom on May 22, 2009.

== Reception ==
Reception

Aggregate score
Aggregator	Score
Metacritic	58/100

Review scores
Publication	Score
4Players	58/100
GameStar	74/100
IGN	5.9/10
Absolute Games	55%
Armchair General	79%
Computer Bild	3.5/5
Pelit	84/100
Vandal	6.3/10

Hired Guns: The Jagged Edge received "mixed or average" reviews according to review aggregator Metacritic.

Larry Levandowski of Armchair General summarized: "Hired Guns takes great pains to emulate its spiritual ancestor, Jagged Alliance; the result is a fun game that satisfies. Fans of the original game and those turn-based gamers who want a good gunfight can’t go wrong with this one."

Fabian Siegismund of GameStar said: "It takes quite some time to get into the game and a lot of it will be spent loading saved games, but once you're over that stage, Hired Guns offers a lot of fun. The game feels like a graphically enhanced Jagged Alliance 2, which isn't bad - quite the opposite. Hired Guns has its weaknesses, but is appealing nonetheless."

Steve Butts of IGN summarized: "Overpowered enemies, underpowered weapons, breathless mercenaries and a complete lack of range and accuracy information keep the game from competing with the other titles in the genre."

Niko Nirvi of Pelit called it a good tactical strategy game and the best game in the genre since Silent Storm. Nirvi criticized the lack of strong character personalities and attention to detail that are present in the Jagged Alliance series.
