= Rampage Knights =

2015 video game

- Developer: Rake in Grass
- Composer: Ján Dušek
- Platforms: Windows, OS X
- Release: WW: 4 September 2015
- Genre: Roguelike
- Modes: Single-player, multiplayer

Rampage Knights is a 2015 roguelike video game by Czech developer Rake in Grass.

== Gameplay ==
The player controls a Knight who fights enemies in a procedurally generated dungeon. He can upgrade his character as he progresses in the game and also buy him better equipment. The player can also unlock new characters. The game can also be played in cooperative multiplayer on one computer.

== Development ==
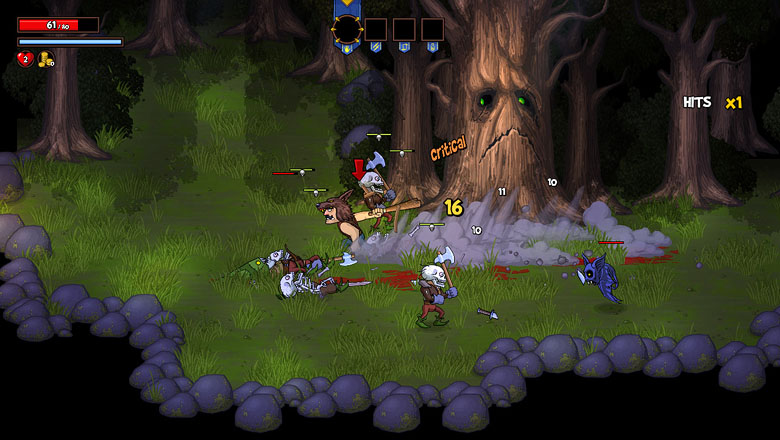
Screenshot

The game is inspired by The Binding of Isaac and Golden Axe. It was announced on 8 March 2013 as a mixture of fast action beat 'em up game and dungeon crawler with a focus for exploration.

The developers later changed their plans so the game was to be more linear because the map with exploring was causing too much frustration. The developers also released a playable demo and started an Indiegogo campaign and a Steam Greenlight campaign. The game was Greenlighted on 11 June 2014 but the Indiegogo campaign was unsuccessful. The developers then announced they plan to finish the game. Unsuccess on Indiegogo means stripping of the unnecessary extra features intended. They also mentioned of a possibility that the game will be released in Early Access.

The game was released as early access on 29 March 2015. The game was released on 4 September.

== Reception ==
The game has an 80% on Metacritic.
