= Underkeep =

- Developer: Rake in Grass
- Platforms: Microsoft Windows; Nintendo Switch
- Release: Windows: November 5, 2026
- Genres: Role-playing game, dungeon crawler
- Mode: Single-player

Underkeep is a Czech role-playing video game developed by Rake in Grass. It is a dungeon crawler set in a fantasy world and inspired by classic role-playing games of the 1990s. The game combines exploration of underground environments, turn-based combat and character progression. It was released for personal computers on November 5, 2026.

== Plot ==
The game takes place in a fantasy world in which a group of adventurers descends into an underground fortress known as Underkeep. During their exploration of its extensive underground areas, the characters discover hidden locations, encounter various inhabitants and face enemies and ancient puzzles.

== Gameplay ==
Underkeep is a grid-based dungeon crawler featuring a first-person perspective and a turn-based combat system. The player assembles a party of four heroes and explores underground corridors and rooms, searches for equipment and overcomes traps and logic puzzles. Movement takes place one tile at a time, while turn-based battles allow the player to plan individual actions.

During the party creation, players can choose from different races and character classes, including fighters, mages and archers. Characters gradually improve their abilities and find items that modify their attributes or provide them with new options. The game also features a map and supports both keyboard and gamepad controls.

== Development ==
The game was developed by the Czech independent studio Rake in Grass, which also created Undercroft. The project originally began as a smaller retro role-playing game but gradually evolved into a larger dungeon crawler featuring more elaborate combat mechanics, various races and character classes, and hand-crafted locations.

A playable demo was released on Steam in February 2026. Following feedback from players, the developers continued to adjust the combat system, user interface and other elements of the game. In September 2026, they announced that the full version would be released on November 5 of the same year for Microsoft Windows, via Steam and GOG. A version for Nintendo Switch was planned for the first quarter of 2027.

== Reception ==
Ondřej Zach of Bonusweb awarded the game a score of 95%, praising its gameplay, atmosphere and pixel art graphics.

Shortly after its release, the game was recommended by Swedish video game developer Markus Persson, best known as the creator of Minecraft.
