= Jagged Alliance 3 =

2023 video game

- Developer: Haemimont Games
- Publisher: THQ Nordic
- Directors: Boyan Ivanov; Boian Spasov
- Producers: Bisser Dyankov; Pavel Peychev
- Designers: Boyan Ivanov; Boian Spasov
- Artists: Nelson Inomvan; Dimitar Nikolov
- Writers: Ian Currie; Daniel McClure; Radomir Mirchev
- Composer: George Strezov
- Series: Jagged Alliance
- Platforms: Windows; PlayStation 4; PlayStation 5; Xbox One; Xbox Series X/S
- Release: Windows; July 14, 2023; PS4, PS5, Xbox One, Series X/S; November 16, 2023
- Genres: Tactical role-playing, turn-based tactics
- Modes: Single-player, multiplayer

Jagged Alliance 3 is a 2023 tactical role-playing video game, developed by Haemimont Games, and published by THQ Nordic initially for Windows, but later released on PlayStation 4, PlayStation 5, Xbox One and Xbox Series X/S. The game is the fourteenth entry in the Jagged Alliance series, and the first mainline entry game since Jagged Alliance 2, and sees players leading a group of mercenaries as they focus on assisting a small African country end the chaos it was thrown into by a rogue paramilitary force who kidnapped its president, along the way dealing with other issues including seizing diamond mines, dealing with criminal factions, and uncovering a conspiracy behind the paramilitaries.

Gameplay involves both the use of a dynamic strategic map - where players can move mercenaries, conduct operations, and review active missions, enemy activity, and intel acquired - and tactical exploration that involves turn-based combat with the option of stealth to weaken enemies -with each conflict featuring differenes in terrain - ranging from mountains, swamps, savannahs, and urban environments - and weather conditions; some also featuring wild animals. Mercenaries each have their own strengths and weakness, as well as preferences to who they will and will not work with, with a wide selection of real-world firearms and melee weapons, most of which can be enhanced with upgrades, as well as armour, tools, explosives and grenades to help with combat and other situations. Alongside the main story, players can engage in a variety of side missions, with choices made during the campaign impacting later events and rewards.

Jagged Alliance 3 took several years to move beyond the concept stage, switching between different developers, before development began in 2021. The final version received positive reviews from critics.

== Gameplay ==
Played from an isometric perspective, Jagged Alliance 3 is a turn-based tactics video game in which the player issues commands to a squad of mercenaries. Each member of the player's squad has their own unique backstories and personalities. The game features a roster of 40 mercenaries, including several returning characters such as Vicki Waters, Ivan Dolvich and Fidel Dahan. Weapons can be customized and the mercenaries can aim at individual body parts of an enemy. They can also be looted for their resources. Players can access a dynamic campaign map, which will provide more context about each individual turn-based battle, and how the enemy forces react to them as they attempt to retake these territories. Players will gain intel as they progress, thus unlocking additional side missions and opportunities. As the mercenaries level up, they will also unlock new skills and abilities. The game features a cooperative multiplayer mode.

== Plot ==
=== Setting ===
Jagged Alliance 3 takes place in Grand Chien (French for "Big Dog"), a fictional country in Africa. Originally a colony of France, it was embroiled in fighting against Germany during the Second World War, maintaining relics from the conflict including bunkers and weapons. The country gained independence from France after the war, but maintains a mixture of French and German names. The country consists of several towns and villages, along with farmlands, swamps, highlands, savannas, and river jungle deltas, with its economy mostly consisting of agriculture, tourism and diamond mining.

The game takes place three years after the events of Jagged Alliance 2, with player recruiting mercenaries - a mixture of past mercernaries from the last two games, alongside brand new ones - from the Association of Internal Mercernaries (A.I.M.).

=== Synopsis ===
In 2001, Alphonse LaFontaine, president of Grand Chien, is kidnapped by a rogue paramilitary force known as "the Legion". Led by a mysterious figurehead known only as "The Major", the Legion demands control of the country's mines, threatening to kill Alphonse if his government attempts to interfere. Concerned for her father's safety, and deeply worried his political enemies will take advantage of the situation, Alphonse's daughter Emma seeks help from mercernary leader "Boss" (the player). Providing them with funds to recruit mercernaries, she asks them to stop the Legion and rescue her father.

To assist them in their operations, Emma has the Boss work with Corazon Santiago, a representative of the Adonis Corporation, who agrees to fund their mission on the condition they retake the country's mines for her company. While initially working to secure a small island to act as a forward base, the Boss and their team from A.I.M. learn that Adonis originally hired mercernaries from More Economic Recruiting Center (M.E.R.C.) to deal with the Legion: a group led by the company's founder Biff Aspcott - a former A.I.M. mercenary - that went missing after they headed for the mainland.

Working to combat the legion, the Boss' team find themselves dealing with several other matters, including criminal outfits, a communist cell, a disease outbreak, and various other problems from the local populace. During this time, the Boss discovers evidence that Corazon and the Major know each other, especially after Biff - who the team rescue from an attack - reveals that the Legion's leader is Spike Scallion, a former A.I.M. mercernary who was originally working in North Korea, and that Adonis hired him to help them secure control of Grand Chien's mines as Alphonse was proving problematic.

Fearful of exposure as the Boss' team begin liberating territory from the Legion, Corazon contacts Colonel Faucheux, head of Grand Chien's forces, to deal with them by framing them for the slaughter of refugees. Whilst combatting his troops assigned to kill them, the team learn Faucheux plans to kill Alphonse and stage a military coup for the country. To prevent this, the team work to defeat Scallion and rescue Alphonse (the former they either kill, spare, or recruit), and then bring down Falcheux and Corazon. After ending the threat the coup, Alphonse and Emma thank the team for their help, whereupon they focus on sorting out the country, which either stabilizes after the chaos, or remains unstable, impacting the outcome of other events the team dealt with.

== Development ==
Jagged Alliance 3 was first announced in 2004. Strategy First and Game Factory Interactive initially partnered with Russian studio MiST Land South to produce a sequel to the game. However, a year later, Strategy First withdrew the title from MiST Land South and began developing the title internally. In December 2006, Strategy First outsourced Jagged Alliance 3 again. The publisher, along with Russian developers Akella and F3games, were to create the game, setting an approximate release date of late 2008. As of October 2008 the game had been delayed again and Akella's website was displaying a release date of Q1 2010, but the studio also stopped developing the game in 2009.

On March 9, 2010, German outfit bitComposer Games (now bitComposer Interactive) picked up the rights to the PC strategy series and started "preliminary development" on the third full game for release in 2011.

In August 2015, Nordic Games acquired the rights from bitComposer during their insolvency.

On September 17, 2021, during the THQ Nordic 10th Anniversary Digital Showcase Jagged Alliance 3 was announced for PC, now in development by Haemimont Games, the developer of the Tropico series. Haemimont Games initially pitched a spin-off project to THQ Nordic, but the publisher was very impressed by the studio's work and instead recruited them to create a mainline sequel instead. THQ Nordic recognized that previous attempts at reviving the series had received a very mixed reception and Jagged Alliance 3 was designed to cater to the "hardcore" fans of the series. Unlike other strategy games such as the XCOM series, Jagged Alliance 3 will not inform players regarding the chance to hit an opponent or their responses to attack. The team believed the franchise should be about responding to unpredictable and chaotic combat situations, and an over-abundance of information may cause players to be too cautious and calculating. The game was released on July 14, 2023, for Windows, and on November 16, 2023, for PlayStation 4, PlayStation 5, Xbox One, and Xbox Series X/S. Modding tools were released for the game in February 2024.

== Reception ==
Reception

Aggregate scores
Aggregator	Score
Metacritic	81/100
OpenCritic	94%

Review scores
Publication	Score
IGN	9/10
PC Gamer (US)	81/100
Shacknews	9/10
VideoGamer.com	8/10

Jagged Alliance 3 received "generally favorable reviews", according to review aggregator Metacritic.
