= Jagged Alliance =

Series of turn-based tactics video games

- Genres: Tactical role-playing, turn-based tactics
- Developers: Madlab Software (1994); Sir-Tech (1996–2000); I-Deal Games (2004); Coreplay (2012); Cliffhanger Productions (2012–2018); Full Control (2014); Haemimont Games (2023)
- Publishers: Sir-Tech (1994–1996); TalonSoft (1999); Interplay Entertainment (2000); Strategy First (2004) bitComposer (2012); Kalypso Media (2012); Gamigo (2013); THQ Nordic (2015–present)
- Platforms: MS-DOS, Windows, AmigaOS, OS X, Linux, Nintendo DS, Web browser, PlayStation 4, Xbox One, PlayStation 5, Xbox Series X/S
- First release: Jagged Alliance; April 1995
- Latest release: Jagged Alliance 3 July 14, 2023

Jagged Alliance is a series of turn-based tactics video games. The first games in the series were released for DOS. From Jagged Alliance 2 on, the games were developed using DirectX for native Windows operation. Jagged Alliance 2 was also released for Linux and is available on Steam and on GOG.com for Windows.

== Overview ==
The Jagged Alliance games center on strategically controlling mercenary squads, on and off the field, who complete various missions such as freeing countries from oppressive dictators. The games feature a mix of turn-based battle simulation, 4X (explore, expand, exploit, and exterminate) elements and role-playing.

Humour via spoken character comments is a trademark of the series. The personalities of the individual mercenaries range from mildly eccentric to disturbed. This contrasts the games' setting which is otherwise closely linked to such subjects as war and death.

Each mercenary is an individual with their own traits. Part of the strategy was the player's freedom to select a multi-faceted team to win the game in different ways. Not all teams would work; for example, Ivan and his nephew Igor, who work well together, are hated by Steroid, the Polish bodybuilder. "Buns", a Danish markswoman, hates "Fox", a medic with centerfold looks. In contrast, "Fox" loves working with "Grizzly," on whom she has something of a crush.

The mercenaries may be out on various assignments, determined randomly, so that the available pool of characters is never the same for each game.

The player has to maintain a level of reputation in the Jagged Alliance games. If the player gets their troops killed often, regularly hires and dismisses members or generally is insensitive (such as not paying for deceased merc body shipments back home), their reputation will lower. Bad player's reputation affects all mercenaries. Mercs may demand a significant pay raise to consider working for the player. Hired mercenaries may quit unless the player discreetly pays them a bonus. And only desperate-for-work mercs will agree to work for really notorious players.

== Intellectual property ==
The intellectual property (IP) for Jagged Alliance has been exchanged between many companies. The series and IP were created by Mad Labs Software, who later became a part of the publisher for the first game, Sir-Tech Software, Inc., along with a transfer of IP. The second game, Jagged Alliance 2, was also started by Sir-Tech. When Sir-Tech's publishing arm went bankrupt, the game rights were transferred to its development house Sir-Tech Canada and published by TalonSoft. By the time Jagged Alliance 2: Unfinished Business was released, Sir-Tech's publishing arm was out of business and the game was released by Interplay. Subsequently, TalonSoft went bankrupt. At the moment Strategy First owns the IP and has published Jagged Alliance: Wildfire. Strategy First made several attempts to extend the series with Jagged Alliance 3D and Jagged Alliance 3, both of which never saw the light of day. Strategy First was acquired by Silverstar Holdings, which then ran into financial problems and was delisted by NASDAQ. It is unclear what effect this will have on future games using the Jagged Alliance IP, though in the final SEC filing before being delisted Silverstar stated that it had reached a settlement of some issues with Russia-based Akella: "Akella and 3A Entertainment have the option to acquire certain intellectual property rights for the Jagged Alliance and Disciples franchises for an additional $100,000".

The first Jagged Alliance game was developed by MadLab Software, Montreal. Qc, the following three games were developed by Sir-Tech Development based in Ottawa, Ontario. Ian Currie, Shaun Lyng and Linda Currie were the lead designers on the Jagged Alliance series. MadLab was absorbed by Sir-Tech Canada but the company shut down in late 2003.

Nordic Games acquired the rights for Jagged Alliance in 2015 after bitComposer's bankruptcy.

== Games ==
Release timeline
1995	Jagged Alliance
1996	Jagged Alliance: Deadly Games
1997
1998
1999	Jagged Alliance 2
2000	Jagged Alliance 2: Unfinished Business
2001
2002	Jagged Alliance 2: Gold Pack
2003
2004	Jagged Alliance 2: Wildfire
2005
2006
2007
2008
2009	Jagged Alliance DS
2010
2011
2012	Jagged Alliance: Back in Action
2012	Jagged Alliance: Crossfire
2012	Jagged Alliance Online
2013	Jagged Alliance: Flashback
2014
2015	Jagged Alliance Online: Reloaded
2016
2017
2018	Jagged Alliance: Rage!
2019
2020
2021
2022
2023	Jagged Alliance 3

=== Jagged Alliance ===
The GUI for Jagged Alliance: Deadly Games, showing the player's mercs bordering the playing field. In Jagged Alliance 2, the mercs are lined up along the bottom.

Released in 1995 for MS-DOS, this first game of the series tasks the player with freeing the fictional island of Metavira from the greedy Santino. The player must recruit mercenaries as they explore, capture, and hold new territory. The natives harvest the valuable trees from which a revolutionary medicine can be extracted; a result of the island having been used as a nuclear testing ground in 1952. The more trees the player holds, the more income they make. Income can be used to hire native guards and hire more mercenaries to take the offensive and clear more sectors of enemies.

This game features a top-down perspective of the game field for battles, with character portraits framing the view on the left and right sides. A separate map view shows the entire country broken up into distinct conquerable sectors.

==== Jagged Alliance DS ====
In May 2009, a Nintendo DS Jagged Alliance game was released, based on the original Jagged Alliance.

=== Jagged Alliance: Deadly Games ===
Released in 1996, Deadly Games is a DOS sequel to the original game. It features a different format, however, and is considered by some to be more of a spin-off than a sequel. This game features the same engine and top-down perspective as the original game.

=== Jagged Alliance 2 ===
This game was released in 1999 for Windows and was later ported to Linux by Tribsoft. The mission of this second official game of the series is to free the country of Arulco from its evil dictator Queen Deidranna. Deidranna married the democratically elected King of Arulco, then launched a coup d'état eight years ago, deposing her husband and taking power for herself. The player is "hired" by the exiled king, Enrico Chivaldori, to free his homeland of Deidranna's dictatorial regime.

Gameplay is similar to the original grand adventure style of Jagged Alliance, but features higher-resolution graphics and an isometric pseudo-3D view of the battleground. The terrain has two height levels (ground and rooftops) for player / enemy sprites and a basic physics engine for thrown objects and ballistics. It also features "destructible terrain" in that players are able to blow open walls and buildings with explosives. The game also takes place across diverse and rather imaginative locations, including a multi-level prison facility, a school, a hospital, surface-to-air missile (SAM) sites, a swamp and a junkyard.

The weapons arsenal has grown considerably to include a variety of weapons based on real-life counterparts (such as automatic weapons, shotguns, rocket launchers) and also fictional weapons like an auto firing rocket rifle. There are some more role-playing elements like specialty professions and the possibility to create a custom mercenary as well.

Mercs can talk to one another during missions, usually spouting one-liners and other comments to each other.

In June 2005, Pocket PC Studios and Strategy First announced a conversion of Jagged Alliance 2 Gold for the Nintendo DS. This was never released.

JA2 has been extensively modded by fans of the series. Most notable include, but are not limited to: v1.13, Urban Chaos, Deidranna Lives, Renegade Republic. and JA2-Stracciatella.

==== Jagged Alliance 2: Unfinished Business ====
Jagged Alliance 2: Unfinished Business, alternatively known as Jagged Alliance 2.5, is a short, mission-based standalone sequel released by Sir-Tech in 2000. This release adds some tweaks to the combat engine, as well as a scenario editor, yet the gameplay remains largely unchanged. It allows importing of the character created for JA2 with his or her final stats; the improved stats of other mercenaries will then be imported too.

A new plot is introduced in Unfinished Business. The original owners of Arulco's lucrative mines have returned and established a missile base in the nearby country of Tracona, demanding the mines are returned to them. They destroy Arulco's now-empty Tixa prison as an example of what happens if their demands are not met. The player must put a team of mercenaries together to infiltrate Tracona and disable the missile base.

==== Jagged Alliance 2: Gold Pack ====
Jagged Alliance 2: Gold Pack was published by Strategy First on August 6, 2002 and adds the improvements of Unfinished Business to the final release of Jagged Alliance 2. Unfinished Business and a scenario editor are also included in the package.

Gold Pack introduces notable changes to the difficulty setting. The player choosing an advanced difficulty level may also decide to make the player turns timed and whether to disallow saving during combat, as opposed to the original Jagged Alliance 2, which set these settings automatically.

==== Jagged Alliance 2: Wildfire ====
Jagged Alliance 2: Wildfire, version 5, was programmed by i-Deal Games and published by Strategy First in 2004 as an official expansion pack. The game's sourcecode was also published in the package, albeit under license. The project had started as a hobby add-on by Serge "WildFire" Popoff, who decided to make it commercial since version 4.

Compared to the original Jagged Alliance 2, Wildfire 5 has not altered the game engine or controls and can be considered a mod. The focus was instead directed into designing revamped environments, new items and stronger enemies. This presents players with a more challenging campaign, however the goals and progression remain the same. In terms of gameplay features, the game remains almost unchanged.

Soon after release, i-Deal Games terminated relations with Strategy First stating "...SF fulfilled none of it's [sic] obligation of contract and paid no single cent to i-Deal Games...". Consequently, WF5 remains largely unpatched, only minor hotfixes were published. I-Deal Games also stated that buggy version were released by Strategy First.

After the falling out with Strategy First, i-Deal Games developed another version of Wildfire, identified as "version 6", with Zuxxez Entertainment (now TopWare Interactive AG) as distributor.

WF6 contains changed source code, a tweaked graphics engine that allows for a higher resolution, introduces new mercenaries and increases squad size from 6 to 10. It can be patched up to version 6.04 (for English version), up to 6.06 (for German version), or up to 6.08 (for Russian version).

WF5 can not be upgraded to WF6 and patches for WF6 can not be applied. See Digital distribution for further details.

Jagged Alliance 2 Wildfire (v5) was distributed electronically by Strategy First. Jagged Alliance 2 Wildfire (v6) was distributed electronically by Zuxxez Entertainment. Two versions of the same game (Wildfire) exist due to the game's publisher Strategy First, Inc. falling out after a disagreement with the game's developer, I-Deal Games Studios concerning expenses. Version 5 is the version published by SF before this spat and so is more problematic than v6, the version released through Zuxxez and others by the developer since the incident.

=== Jagged Alliance 3 ===
==== Jagged Alliance 3D / Hired Guns: The Jagged Edge ====
Strategy First and Game Factory Interactive announced in June 2004 that Russian developer MiST Land South would develop the next two games in the Jagged Alliance series: Jagged Alliance 3D (JA3D) and Jagged Alliance 3 (JA3).

Jagged Alliance 3D was envisioned as "JA2 in 3D", or basically the same game as Jagged Alliance 2 but using a 3D engine. Jagged Alliance 3 would be the "true sequel" to JA2, a full-fledged game in the same spirit as JA2, and using the engine developed for JA3D. JA3D would come out quickly, within a year or two of the release of the generally successful Wildfire mod, and be followed by Jagged Alliance 3. SFI choose GFI because GFI had already released Cops 2170, a tactical-strategy game published by SFI in North America. The two companies already had a relationship, and it was felt the JA3D project could be mutually beneficial.

From statements made by both Strategy First and Game Factory Interactive, it is apparent that GFI assumed the costs for the development, with SFI providing the intellectual property and the overall vision for the project. This arrangement proved to be very cumbersome, and prone to misunderstandings and confusion. SFI, naturally enough, had very ambitious goals for JA3D while GFI sought to control development costs and time.

The initial plan was for GFI to use a modified Cops 2170 engine to quickly produce JA3D. However, GFI already had a second strategy game in production, ALFA: Anti-terror, and they made the decision to use this engine for both games. GFI planned to set the game in Africa, which was fine with SFI. However, GFI ran into trouble with the strategic layer for Jagged Alliance. They proposed a mission-based structure for JA3D instead. There would be no free-flowing strategic layer, as in Jagged Alliance and Jagged Alliance 2 where the player made strategic movement decisions, and initiated attacks on a map. Instead, the game would be structured like Jagged Alliance: Deadly Games, with a series of missions, which were essentially combat-only levels. SFI was resistant to the idea, but agreed to it, feeling this would shorten the development time. Besides, JA3D was always intended as a bridge between JA2 and JA3, so it was acceptable that it was not a "full game".

In 2004, initial screenshots of the new engine were released, showing a somewhat primitive 3D engine with familiar Jagged Alliance characters, such as Shadow.

In May 2005, the MiST Land South developers announced they would be discarding the turn-based combat system in favor of real-time combat. The turn-based combat had been a hallmark of Jagged Alliance from the very beginning, and it was a major reason why most fans stayed with the game. This announcement was a surprise to Strategy First, and was very quickly vetoed by Richard Therrien, VP product development of SFI.

In September 2005, SFI withdrew the rights for Jagged Alliance 3 from GFI, leaving them with the JA3D license only.

A pre-beta version of JA3D was shown at the 2006 E3 convention, and received a generally favorable reception. The gameplay appeared to be very similar to Jagged Alliance 2, with updated and improved graphics, as well as a 3D combat engine.

On July 20, 2006, Game Factory Interactive announced that MiST Land South was being dissolved, as of August 1, 2006.

In August 2006, SFI withdrew the rights to JA3D as well. GFI claimed that the game simply did not fit within SFI's plans. SFI, on the other hand, stated that JA3D was in an incomplete state and not ready for the scheduled release date. It was obvious that SFI, having faced years of development without any progress, had finally given up on the project.

This left GFI with no rights to use any of the intellectual property of JA3D, including characters and story line. GFI announced plans to rework the characters and story to remove Jagged Alliance-specific details and publish the game under a different name. In a September 3, 2006 post on its discussion boards, GFI claimed that SFI owed it money, but this was denied by SFI without further elaboration. One of the changes GFI planned to make to JA3D was the introduction of a strategic layer.

In November 2007 Game Factory Interactive released Hired Guns: The Jagged Edge. The game does not have any storyline or characters in common with JA2, as GFI lost the rights to use any of the intellectual property of Strategy First. Still, it is seen as a spiritual successor; the game is structurally similar to Jagged Alliance series and features a mercenary-themed plot, turn-based gameplay, and a familiar game interface.

==== Jagged Alliance 3 development hell ====
Strategy First intended to produce Jagged Alliance 3 internally, with head developer Thiessen promising a much more open experience than any other Jagged Alliance game. There were expected to be five separate factions to fight in JA3, instead of a single enemy. Characters were said to have their own agendas and allegiances in addition to randomization of various settings of the game upon startup in order to make it less predictable; a character who was allied with the player in one game could be their enemy in the next. Player actions were also said to influence how the characters of the world react to them.

In December 2006, Strategy First outsourced Jagged Alliance 3 again. The publisher, along with Russian developers Akella and F3games, were to create the game, setting an approximate release date of late 2008.

As of October 2008 the game has been delayed again, and Akella's website was displaying a release date of Q1 2010. This delay was likely due to publishers demand to improve graphics.

On December 21, 2009, a German language game site reported that Akella had stopped development on Jagged Alliance 3. Strategy First had made no statement on the future of the Jagged Alliance series.

On March 9, 2010, German outfit bitComposer Games (now bitComposer Interactive) picked up the rights to the PC strategy series, and started "preliminary development" on the third full game for release in 2011. In August 2015, Nordic Games (now THQ Nordic) acquired the rights from bitComposer. “The decision to acquire Jagged Alliance was an absolute no-brainer for us”, commented Reinhard Pollice, Business & Product Development Director at Nordic Games, although no immediate announcement has been made regarding their specific plans for the series.

==== Jagged Alliance 3 release ====
On September 17, 2021, during the THQ Nordic 10th Anniversary Digital Showcase Jagged Alliance 3 was announced for PC, now in development by Haemimont Games. It was released on July 14, 2023.

=== Jagged Alliance: Back in Action ===
On August 20, 2010, bitComposer Games announced Jagged Alliance: Back in Action, a full-scale remake of Jagged Alliance 2. It was originally titled Jagged Alliance: Reloaded. The game was demonstrated at GDC 2011 and released on February 9, 2012.

The stated goal of the remake was to improve the original game concept as well as the visual weaknesses of the original. The story and content are noticeably different from the original as well, with key strategic elements such as boardable vehicles and training of militia removed. Mercenaries are easier to train and permanently hired for a one-time fee rather than the time-based pay of the original. Conversation trees with NPCs have been replaced with linear "talk or stop talking" dialogue. Humorous cut-scenes featuring the exploits of the Queen have also been removed.

Jagged Alliance: Back in Action features then-modern 3D graphics in an isometric perspective. The user interface was completely redesigned and includes a new detailed tutorial that helps new players to learn how to play the game properly. The new real time "Plan & Go" system optionally removes the classic Jagged Alliance staple of turn based gameplay. It also initially removed the fog of war, making the tactical element of the game simpler and faster to play as it was unnecessary for the player to prepare for enemy surprise attacks or ambushes with all enemies immediately visible. A fog of war system was added to the game post-release called tactical mode, which requires mercenaries to acquire a line of sight on an enemy for them to become visible. The developers estimate that the remake will take players around 70 hours to complete.

The critical reception was mixed at best, with armchairempire.com saying "Jagged Alliance: Back In Action is, and probably will for many years hence be, the definitive textbook example of how to mess up by the numbers when attempting to "relaunch" a classic franchise". Even Finnish Pelit magazine, in one of the most positive reviews internationally, stated "Back in Action is not a bad game, but pales in comparison to its father".

The first downloadable content pack Shades of Red was released for Jagged Alliance: Back in Action on May 18, 2012.

The second downloadable content pack Point Blank was released on June 14, 2012.

==== Jagged Alliance: Crossfire ====
On June 13, 2012, bitComposer Games and Kalypso announced the first add-on to Jagged Alliance: Back in Action. The standalone add-on, Jagged Alliance: Crossfire adds new mercenaries, new environments and new weapons.

The setting of Crossfire takes place shortly after the events of Jagged Alliance 2 at Khaanpa, a small micronation located somewhere in the volatile Asia region. A huge temple has been uncovered and with it a large vein of coltan ore. This triggers a destructive religious conflict funded by the resources which had led to the deaths of many innocent people caught in crossfire, as the leader of the Jenitenn Cult profits from the disaster through humanitarian aid. The United Nations is unwilling to send peacekeepers in a possible chance to fail in peacekeeping efforts and the ambassador of Khaanpa sends AIM to defuse the threat. Upon the death of the leader of the cult, a volcanic eruption occurs near Khaanpa and the UN finally sends in a peacekeeping effort to help rebuild the nation in the wake of the crossfire.

It was released on August 24, 2012, on Steam in a downloadable format and elsewhere on September 25, 2012, as a physical product.

Jagged Alliance: Crossfire was developed by the Coreplay Studio in Munich.

=== Jagged Alliance Online ===
Jagged Alliance Online was developed by Vienna-based Cliffhanger Productions and features full 3D graphics. It was a free-to-play game made in Unity. It had single-player and player versus player missions.

The MMO offers the usual Jagged Alliance game mechanics, a mix of turn-based combat and real-time action. From a 3D isometric perspective, each player controls and maintains a group of mercenaries and is tasked to use their abilities to complete missions and collect money and build reputation. To succeed, players are required to train and equip their mercenaries with better weapons and tools. Players can also help each other working together to complete battlegrounds and there are also player versus player battles. Players operate from a Headquarters which can be built up and improved upon. From here players can send their mercenaries on over 100 missions around the globe. Although the game is free, there is additional single player content that needs to be purchased, which can be done so online.

gamigo AG and bitComposer Games announced at Gamescom 2010 that a new title, Jagged Alliance Online, a web browser tactical MMORPG was in development and due for a 2011 release. A closed beta version was released on November 18, 2011. A multiplayer mode was added to the beta on January 16, 2012. An open beta version was released on February 16, 2012. The game received a major update before a 2013 Steam release.

Jagged Alliance Online won the 2012 Deutscher Entwicklerpreis for best browser game.

Jagged Alliance Online was shut down in April 2015. A successor, Jagged Alliance Online: Reloaded, was released in May 2015 by Cliffhanger Productions. Reloaded was shut down on November 30, 2018.

=== Jagged Alliance: Flashback ===
In April 2013, Full Control, a Denmark-based game studio, launched a Kickstarter campaign to fund Jagged Alliance: Flashback. The Kickstarter campaign was successful on May 23, 2013, resulting in the game being fully funded including its firsts stretch goal. The game was released on October 21, 2014.

Upon release Jagged Alliance: Flashback received mostly negative reviews from both critics and players alike and, as a result of poor sales, the developers of Full Control announced that they would no longer be providing support for the game. Full Control went out of business shortly afterwards due to financial difficulties.

=== Jagged Alliance: Rage! ===
Jagged Alliance: Rage! is set 20 years after the first Jagged Alliance. The game was developed by now-defunct Vienna-based developer Cliffhanger Productions and published by HandyGames on December 6, 2018.

== Other media ==
In March 2007, Strategy First announced that they had penned a deal for the creation of a film based upon the Jagged Alliance property. The movie license was acquired by Los Angeles-based Union Entertainment.

On October 20, 2017, Underground Games announced a board game based on the franchise, titled Jagged Alliance: The Board Game. The game was originally planned for a 2018 release but this was delayed to 2019. Charles Theel of Strategy Gamer gave the game a positive review, saying: "This is a high quality game, full stop."
