= Jagged Alliance: Flashback =

2014 video game

- Developer: Full Control
- Publisher: Full Control
- Series: Jagged Alliance
- Engine: Unity
- Platforms: Linux, OS X, Windows
- Release: October 21, 2014
- Genre: Turn-based tactics
- Mode: Single-player

Jagged Alliance: Flashback is a turn-based tactics video game developed and published by Full Control for the PC via Linux, OS X, and Windows in October 2014. It is part of the Jagged Alliance series.

== Gameplay ==
Jagged Alliance: Flashback is a turn-based tactics game. The game takes place during a revolt on the fictional Caribbean island San Hermanos in the 1980s. The player takes control of a team of mercenaries to try to depose the forces of "The Prince", the king of San Hermanos. The player can design their mercenary in a character creator. The game is in real-time until the enemy is sighted, when the game changes to turn-based mode. Action points are used for movement and shooting. Guns can be aimed at different body parts.

== Release ==
Jagged Alliance: Flashback was developed by Full Control, a studio based in Copenhagen, Denmark. It was announced on April 11, 2013 that Full Control had signed with bitComposer to develop the next installment in the Jagged Alliance series. On April 23, 2013, Full Control launched a Kickstarter campaign for the game, that was now called Jagged Alliance: Flashback. The Kickstarter campaign was funded on May 23, 2013. A closed alpha version was released for Kickstarter backers in April 2014. The game was released on Steam's early access on May 16, 2014. The full version was released on October 21, 2014 for Windows, Linux, and OS X.

== Reception ==
Reception

Aggregate score
Aggregator	Score
Metacritic	52/100

Review scores
Publication	Score
4Players	61/100
Eurogamer	4/10 (Italy); 3/10 (Poland)
Computer Bild	3.1/10 (Germany); 3.5/10 (Poland)
Game World Navigator	1.4/10
Gry-Online	3.0/10
Pelaaja	3/10

Jagged Alliance: Flashback received "mixed or average" reviews according to review aggregator Metacritic. Davide Pessach of Eurogamer said it was a poor series entry that was unlikely to be saved by modders because of how the deeply the problems run. Marcel Kleffmann of 4Players criticized the streamlined elements of the game. Though he said the combat worked well, he recommended Wasteland 2 instead. Grzegorz Bobrek of Gry-Online said the game did not improve from the poor prerelease version and demanded that the studio fix the problems. Miikka Lehtonen of Pelaaja wrote, "As it stands, the game is by no means worth its price tag, and vague talks about future plans will not change the situation. Get Jagged Alliance 2 instead, it's still ten times better."

Softpedia awarded the game with the "Biggest Disappointment of 2014".
