= Jets'n'Guns 2 =

2020 video game

- Steam cover art
- Developer: Rake in Grass
- Publisher: Rake in Grass
- Composer: Machinae Supremacy
- Platforms: Windows, Switch, PlayStation 4, PlayStation 5
- Release: Windows; 24 July 2020; Switch; 26 August 2020
- Genre: Scrolling shooter
- Mode: Single-player

Jets'n'Guns 2 is a horizontally scrolling shooter developed and published by Czech studio Rake in Grass and the sequel to the 2004 game Jets'n'Guns. It was released on 24 July 2020 for Microsoft Windows, on 26 August 2020 for Nintendo Switch and on 24 August 2023 for PlayStation 4 and PlayStation 5.

== Gameplay ==
Gameplay screenshot

Gameplay is very similar to previous game. It is a 2D side-scrolling shoot 'em up game in which players task is to reach end of the level.

Between levels, players are given the option to buy upgrades for their ship. Some of the most vital upgrades are for health/armor and cooling. They can also give their ship a new paint job for free. Another item is the Atarix 5000, which gives players a chance to unlock crates found when they destroy transport ships during a mission. There are several upgrades that boost the ship's defense and provide slow armor regeneration, such as shields and nanomachines. Other upgrades give players bounties for killing certain enemies, and bonuses for mass killings of enemy troops. There are also upgrades that allow players to customize up to five different weapon profiles, which can be switched mid-game, or allow players to change the angle of their weapons to adapt to changing strategic situations.

As the game progresses, more weapons and items are made available. The fighter the player starts with only has slots for 3 front weapons, 4 G.E.M's, an antimatter device, a missile slot, and a rear weapon slot and also a bombing system slot. You were able to change your ship in the first part of the game, but in this one you can only change how it looks. There is a large variety of weapons, ranging from flamethrowers to electro-balls to acid guns. Most weapons can be upgraded after they are bought. This may enhance power, projectile velocity, rate of fire, or the nature of the attack itself. When viewing the status of an individual weapon, meters are shown that indicate its power, heat generation and speed ratings.

Most weapons give off heat when fired, indicated by a heating gauge. This heat dissipates when firing ceases. If the needle passes the orange and then red zones of the gauge the ship overheats, and it will be unable to fire until the needle passes back behind the orange zone. This makes upgrading the cooling system essential. With an improved cooling system, the ship will take longer to overheat, and will cool down faster. Missiles and bombs do not generate heat. The rate of fire for missiles is determined by their upgrade level. Bombs are the only weapons that have a limit pertaining to how many can be fired at any given time. Each bomb that is dropped uses up a portion of a slowly replenishing 'bomb meter'; the amount used by each bomb decreases with upgrades.

== Release ==
The game was announced in November 2016 as a sequel to 2004 video game. Early access version was released on Steam on 11 December 2018. Soundtrack for the game is provided by Machinae Supremacy. Full version was released on 24 July 2020 for Windows, on 26 August 2020 for Nintendo Switch and on 24 August 2023 for PlayStation 4 and PlayStation 5.

== Reception ==
Reception

Aggregate score
Aggregator	Score
Metacritic	(PS5) 80/100

The PlayStation 5 version of Jets'n'Guns 2 received generally favorable reviews from critics, according to the review aggregation website Metacritic.
