= Paradise Cracked =

2002 video game

- Developer: MiST Land South
- Platform: Microsoft Windows
- Release: 2002
- Genre: Turn-based tactics
- Mode: Single-player

Paradise Cracked (Russian: Код доступа: РАЙ, lit. 'Access Code: PARADISE') is a cyberpunk single-player turn-based tactics video game. It was created by MiST Land South (renamed as GFI Russia in 2006) for Microsoft Windows and released in 2002.

The player starts as a character named "Hacker" who is just as the name implies. The player starts with a pistol and the ability to hack certain objects (ATMs, Trade Robots, etc.) as well as a journal which gives maps of the area and tells them missions both current and completed. As certain missions are completed, the character's level will increase and skills can have points added to them increasing areas like strength, aim, hacking skill, health points and so forth.

The game offers the option to play solo or to join with other characters or groups (such as the mob). Hacker is constantly hunted by the law making teaming up with someone in the best interest of the player's survival. Teaming up will also add new missions to Hacker's journal.

Additional weapons, items, and body armor can be acquired by purchase or by killing another player. The character's strength determines what weight of weapons, items etc. he can carry while certain clothing will increase or decrease the number of items they can carry. The heavier the weight, the less distance the character can move in a given turn. As strength and level increase, so will a character's distance he can travel.

The game never really gained much ground in terms of commercial success.
