= Jagged Alliance: Back in Action =

2012 video game

- Developers: Coreplay (Win); Bigmoon Studios (Linux, Mac)
- Publisher: bitComposer / Kalypso Media
- Series: Jagged Alliance
- Platforms: Windows, Linux, macOS
- Release: February 9, 2012 (Win); February 14, 2014 (Linux, Mac)
- Genres: Turn-based tactics Real-time tactics
- Mode: Single-player

Jagged Alliance: Back in Action is a real-time tactics video game developed by Coreplay and published by bitComposer and Kalypso Media for the PC in February 2012. It is a remake of the 1999 Jagged Alliance 2, the third installment in the Jagged Alliance series. An expansion pack, Jagged Alliance: Crossfire, was released August 2012.

== Gameplay ==
Jagged Alliance: Back in Action is a turn-based tactics game. The player is a mercenary captain contracted to liberate the fictional island nation of Arulco. Outside battle, characters move in real time. When a battle starts, the game will switch to turn-based system. The game has a pausable real-time system called "plan-and-go", where you issue orders for the characters while paused.

== Release ==
Jagged Alliance: Back in Action was developed by Coreplay, a studio based in Munich, Germany. It was announced on August 20, 2010 as Jagged Alliance 2: Reloaded, a remake of Jagged Alliance 2. On February 2, 2011, Kalypso Media and bitComposer announced a publishing partnership and a new title: Jagged Alliance: Back in Action. The game was showcased at 2011 Game Developers Conference. At E3 2011, the game was announced to be released on October 18, 2011. On August 11, 2011, the game was delayed to first quarter of 2012. The game was released in German-speaking countries on February 9, 2012. Two downloadable content (DLC) packs were released for the game in May 2012 and June 2012 respectively: Shades of Red and Point Blank. The game was ported to Linux and macOS on February 14, 2014 by Bigmoon Studios.

=== Crossfire ===
A standalone expansion pack, Jagged Alliance: Crossfire, was announced on June 13, 2012. It features a new campaign set in a fictional country of Khanpaa. It also added an optional line of sight mode, fog of war system, and ten new mercenaries. The game was released on August 24, 2012 in German-speaking countries.

== Reception ==
Jagged Alliance: Back in Action

Aggregate score
Aggregator	Score
Metacritic	62/100

Review scores
Publication	Score
4Players	55/100
Destructoid	6.5/
Eurogamer	6/10 (UK); 7/10 (Germany, Italy, Sweden)
GameSpot	5.5/10
GameSpy	2/5
GameStar	73/100
Jeuxvideo.com	11/20
PC Games (DE)	66%
PC PowerPlay	5/10
Gry-Online	7.0/10
Multiplayer.it	7.0/10
Pelit	76/100
Vandal	5.4/10

Jagged Alliance: Crossfire

Aggregate score
Aggregator	Score
Metacritic	63/100

Review scores
Publication	Score
4Players	64/100
Eurogamer	6/10
GameStar	73/100
Absolute Games	50%
Armchair General	75%
GamingBolt	6.5/10
Gry-Online	6.0/10

Jagged Alliance: Back in Action and Jagged Alliance: Crossfire both received "mixed or average" reviews according to review aggregator website Metacritic.

=== Back in Action ===
Josh Tolentino of Destructoid summarized: "Jagged Alliance: Back in Action may ultimately be inferior to its legendary predecessor, but it has just enough of that spark in it to be a compelling, substantial impostor."

Rosario Salatiello of Multiplayer.it said: "Back in Action is a nice game, but some flaws in the artificial intelligence make it less engaging than it may have been. The Plan & Go system is a good try however, and we hope to see more of this in the future, but Jagged Alliance 2 is still on top."

Pelit said: "[Back in Action] fails to capture the magic of its predecessor. Turn-based combat is gone and the mercenaries have lost their edge. The visuals are up to date and roaming Arulco is still a treat, but getting rid of fog of war is a huge mistake. Back in Action is not a bad game, but pales in comparison to its father."

Dan Stapleton of GameSpy summarized: "Even hardcore strategy players are going to have a hell of a time liberating Arulco without it turning into a frustrating quagmire."

Adam Smith of Rock Paper Shotgun said: "[...] it's a shame that the ideas that are JA:BIA's own aren’t executed more effectively, because at the moment a lot of them are still twitching, leaking and making a bit of a mess of things."

=== Crossfire ===
Jim H. Moreno of Armchair General said: "Perhaps the best element I like about Crossfire is the new vertical aspect. Many of the buildings have multiple floors above (and below) ground, giving the ability of mercs to truly use the high ground to their (or your) advantage."

Benjamin Jakobs of Eurogamer said: "You wanted more of the same? Then Crossfire has got you covered. It's an add-on that doesn't bring much new to the table and does little to enhance the core strategic gameplay. That notwithstanding, it still is perfectly solidly playable and quite challenging."

Grzegorz Bobrek of Gry-Online said: "This add-on is imbalanced, has an economy that is unfitted to the new territory, and a lot of "gaming mines" that are easy to step on. All in all, Crossfire is a game worse than Back to Action was on the day of its debut."
