= Larva Mortus =

2008 video game

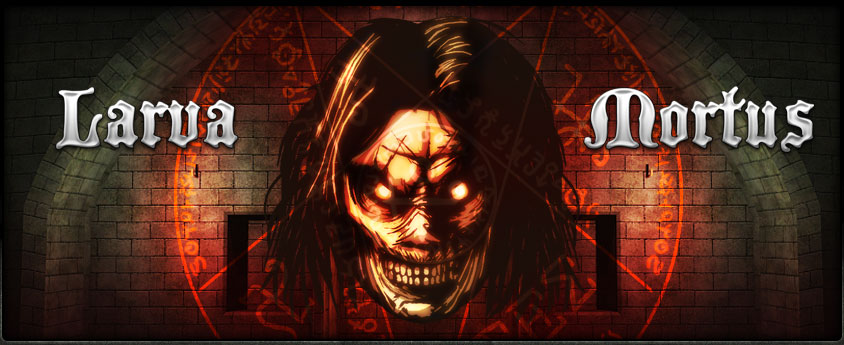
- Developer: Rake in Grass
- Publisher: Meridian4
- Designer: Frantisek Chmelar
- Programmer: Pavel Tovarys
- Artist: Frantisek Chmelar
- Composers: Borislav Slavov, Victor Stoyanov
- Engine: Torque 2D
- Platforms: Microsoft Windows, Mac OS X
- Release: 13 May 2008
- Genres: Top-down shooter, role-playing
- Mode: Single-player

Larva Mortus is a 2008 top-down shooter video game developed by independent developer Rake in Grass. The source code of the Torque 2D based game was made available by the developer under non-commercial usage terms in 2009.

== Plot ==
The game is set at the end of the 19th century. It follows an agent who was recruited by a group which specializes on exorcism of various supernatural evil creatures. He is forced to face an evil from ancient times as it plans to capture a powerful artifact of black magic. The artifact was discovered by five adventurers and broken up between them. The agent has to find all pieces before the evil does so.

== Gameplay ==
The player controls a hunter of monsters. Their task is to kill all enemies in a level. There are 30 types of enemies. Missions are randomly generated. There are role-playing elements, such as the player gains experience by killing monsters.

== Reception ==
The game received mixed to positive reviews.
