= Rake in Grass =

Czech video game developer

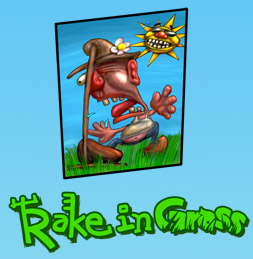
- Type: Private
- Industry: Video games
- Founded: 2000
- Headquarters: Prague, Czech Republic
- Products: Video games
- Number of employees: 3
- Website: rakeingrass.com

Rake in Grass is a three-person independent video game developer based in the Czech Republic. It was founded in 2000. The studio makes computer, mobile, and console games. It was nominated for an award in artistic contribution to Czech video game output in 2012.

== Games ==
- Troll (2003)
- Jets'n'Guns (2004)
- Undercroft (2006)
- Styrateg (2006)
- Fireman's Adventures (2006)
- King Mania (2007)
- Larva Mortus (2008)
- Archibald's Adventures (2008)
- Archmage (2008)
- Be a King: Lost Lands (2009)
- Crystal Cave Classic (2009)
- Westbang (2009)
- Be a King 2 (2010)
- Northmark: Hour of the Wolf (2012)
- Loot Hunter (2014)
- Rampage Knights (2015)
- Jets'n'Guns 2 (2020)
- Silent Sector (2021)
- Bellfortis (2025)
- Underkeep (2026)
