= Jeepney Simulator =

2023 simulator video game

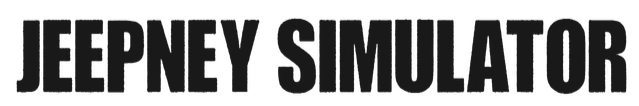
- Developers: Alvin Vann V. Arapoc; Joshua Renzie A. Bicoy
- Publisher: Spacezero Interactive
- Engine: Unity
- Platform: Microsoft Windows
- Release: July 17, 2023 (early access); September 16, 2023
- Genres: Simulator, Driving game, Indie game
- Mode: Single-player

Jeepney Simulator is a 2023 Filipino simulator game developed by indie game studio Spacezero Interactive. An early access version of the game was released on July 17, 2023, and the full version was released on September 16 for Windows as a paid game. Jeepney Simulator is about a video game depicting life as a jeepney driver in the Philippines.

== Gameplay ==
=== Synopsis ===
This game tells the narrative of how one family's heritage is overshadowed by a greedy organization seeking to monopolize public transit.

=== Goal ===
Jeepney Simulator is a first-person simulator game with the goal of taking the passengers on the road and stopping at their destination to have income. And its goal is to buy or upgrade the needs of his house and jeepney. The player needs to get up from the bed and go to Billy's garage to get his Jeepney. The player will start in a green mini jeepney to start the ride of the jeepney at dawn. After the job from Jeepney, the player needs to pay his bills before entering his house. After entering the house, there will be some random questions that you need to answer. The player sees his children named "Timmy" sitting on the front of the computer, and you have a goal to keep their happiness, health, and school status high by pressing the choices if you come to Timmy. On the second floor of the house, you will see his wife, and you have a goal to keep happiness, health, and school status high by pressing the choices. The player will have a shift up to 11:59 PM. If the player does not come back to the house and sleeps on his bed before the clock strikes at 12:00 AM, he will have a midnight fine and will be added to his house bill.

=== Family management ===
After working as a jeepney driver, you can manage the family's health and happiness by interacting with them, buying furniture from the jeepney driver's income, and picking randomized events.

=== Refueling ===
If the jeepney fuel almost runs out, The player can go to the gas station to refill the gas or to Billy's garage to refill the gas with just one click.

=== Customization ===
The player can also customize their Jeep into other colors. And we can upgrade the parts of the jeepney to increase speed, fuel efficiency, and fuel capacity.

=== Characters ===
- Billy - The jeepney driver
- Jessica - Wife of a jeepney driver
- Timmy - Son of a jeepney driver
- Hiraya Corporation - Antagonist corporation who wants to replace the Traditional Jeepney to AI-controlled jeepneys

== Development ==
The team behind the game, Spacezero Interactive, is made up of 3D artist and video editor Alvin Vann V. Arapoc and lead developer Joshua Renzie A. Bicoy.

== Sequel ==
A sequel, Jeepney Simulator 2, was released on April 12, 2024.
