= Cops 2170: The Power of Law =

2004 video game

- North American cover art
- Developer(s): MiST Land South
- Publisher(s): CIS: Russobit-M; NA: Strategy First; EU: DreamCatcher
- Director(s): Vitaly Shutov
- Platform(s): Windows
- Release: CIS: February 2004; NA: January 27, 2005; EU: January 31, 2005
- Genre(s): Turn-based tactics
- Mode(s): Single-player

Cops 2170: The Power of Law (Russian: Власть закона) is a turn-based tactics video game developed by MiST Land South and published by Russobit-M for Windows in 2004.

== Gameplay ==
Cops 2170: The Power of Law is a turn-based tactics game set in a cyberpunk universe. The player controls Katy, a police academy graduate. The gameplay has been compared to the XCOM series.

== Release ==
Russobit-M announced The Power of Law on December 3, 2003, for a release in CIS countries and Baltic states in February 2004. An expansion pack, Police Stories, was announced on September 15, 2004. Strategy First published the game in North America on January 27, 2005. DreamCatcher Interactive published the game in Europe on January 31, 2005.

== Reception ==
Reception

Aggregate score
Aggregator	Score
GameRankings	42/100

Review scores
Publication	Score
4Players	22/100
GameSpot	4.2/10
GameSpy	2.5/5
IGN	3.0/10 (McNamara); 4.0/10 (Haynes)
Jeuxvideo.com	8/20
PC Games (DE)	48%
Absolute Games	65%

Cops 2170: The Power of Law received mostly negative reviews.

GameSpot's criticisms included "[p]oor writing, terrible gameplay, and lackluster graphics". GameSpy said that "it's a game in need of a minor overhaul to make it the great game it could have been." IGN called the game outdated and recommended it to only "serious hardcore gamers". Another IGN reviewer picked music as the stand-out feature: "The music is actually pretty darn good and deserving of a better game."
