= Jets'n'Guns =

2004 video game

- Developer(s): Rake in Grass
- Publisher(s): Rake in Grass (Win, Mac); Reflexive Entertainment and Stardock; Soft-World (Win); Linux Game Publishing (Linux)
- Programmer(s): Jiri "JP" Prochazka
- Artist(s): Frantisek "Undead" Chmelar
- Composer(s): Machinae Supremacy
- Platform(s): Windows, Mac OS X, Linux, Nintendo Switch
- Release: Windows: 17 November 2004 (Rake in Grass): TWN: July 2005; (Soft-World); OS X: 19 April 2006; Switch: 16 December 2019
- Genre(s): Scrolling shooter
- Mode(s): Single-player

Jets'n'Guns is a horizontally scrolling shooter for Microsoft Windows by Czech studio Rake in Grass, It was published in 2004, followed by a version for Mac OS X in April 2006. In December 2006 an expansion, Jets'n'Guns Gold, was released. A port to Linux was developed by Linux Game Publishing. On December 16, 2019, a version was released for Nintendo Switch.

A sequel, Jets'n'Guns 2, was available in early access and released on 25 July 2020.

== Gameplay ==
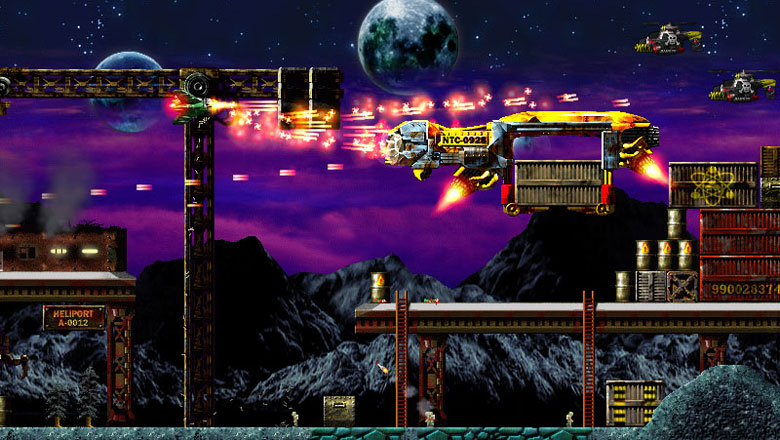
Screenshot

Between levels, players are given the option to buy upgrades for their ship. Some of the most vital upgrades are for maneuverability, speed, health/armor and cooling. They can also give their ship a new paint job for free. Another item is the Atarix, which gives players a chance to unlock crates found when they destroy transport ships during a mission. There are several upgrades that boost the ship's defense and provide slow armor regeneration, such as shields and nanomachines. Other upgrades give players bounties for killing certain enemies, and bonuses for mass killings of enemy troops. There are also upgrades that allow players to customize up to five different weapon profiles, which can be switched mid-game, or allow players to change the angle of their weapons to adapt to changing strategic situations.

As the game progresses, more weapons and items are made available. The fighter the player starts with only has slots for two front weapons and rather limited ship upgrades. The TMIG-226 has slots for one bombing system, one missile system, three front weapons, and one rear weapon. Some weapons can only be used in the front or rear slots. There is a large variety of weapons, ranging from flamethrowers to electro-balls to acid guns. Most weapons can be upgraded after they are bought. This may enhance power, projectile velocity, rate of fire, or the nature of the attack itself. When viewing the status of an individual weapon, meters are shown that indicate its power, heat generation and speed ratings.

Most weapons give off heat when fired, indicated by a heating gauge. This heat dissipates when firing ceases. If the needle passes the orange and then red zones of the gauge the ship overheats, and it will be unable to fire until the needle passes back behind the orange zone. This makes upgrading the cooling system essential. With an improved cooling system, the ship will take longer to overheat, and will cool down faster. Missiles and bombs do not generate heat. The rate of fire for missiles is determined by their upgrade level. Bombs are the only weapons that have a limit pertaining to how many can be fired at any given time. Each bomb that is dropped uses up a portion of a slowly replenishing 'bomb meter'; the amount used by each bomb decreases with upgrades.

== Plot ==
In Jets'n'Guns, the player starts out as a freelancer, contracted to drive out a gang of criminals from a sector of space. Soon, the player is contacted by their old commanding officer from a previous war, Col. Troubleman, who is based aboard the United Space Ship Impotence. He explains that Xoxx, the evil dictator, has appeared again and has kidnapped a scientist, Professor Von Hamburger. The professor was developing a gigantic quantum cannon, which he intended to use for peaceful purposes. Xoxx, however, wants the cannon because it could, theoretically, destroy the entire universe with a single shot. Erecta Von Hamburger, the professor's daughter, also contacts the player, but she is mainly concerned with the rescue of her father.

The player first has to steal a better fighter, the TMIG-226, from the heavily guarded FeX labs. The player then has to rendezvous with the USS Impotence, and is only just saved from destruction by pirates by a well-timed volley of torpedoes from the Impotence. The majority of the following missions involve assaults on Xoxx's forces and attempts to ascertain the locations of the professor and the quantum cannon.

Eventually, after many battles against Xoxx's forces and hench-beings, the player rescues the professor. Soon after, the location of the completed cannon, the Lord Chaos Mk 1, is discovered. However, when the player defeats Xoxx, Xoxx escapes in a "backup time washing machine", his parting message revealing that it is too late to stop the cannon firing. The universe is destroyed, leaving the player's ship flying in a field of rocky debris as the credits roll. Eventually,

- (If the player did not cheat) The Player reaches a restaurant, where he gets a time machine upgrade for his plane. The player will chase Xoxx through the time warp, and after the player defeats it, he reaches the beginning of the game on a harder mode.
- (If the player cheated) a time warp that featured earlier in the story re-appears, bringing the player back to the beginning of the game, except set on a harder mode.

== Development ==
The developers have stated they were heavily inspired by the games Tyrian 2000, Project-X and Walker. As in Tyrian, players earn money by destroying enemies and picking up bonuses in each level. In-between levels, players can purchase weapons and devices for their ship, and upgrade them, provided they have enough money.

However, Jets'n'Guns is more complex than Tyrian in this respect. There are many more weapons to choose from, a greater variety of devices to purchase and more ways to upgrade the player's ship. Also, unlike in Tyrian, where a player could get through most, if not all of the game using the weapons available at the start of the game (with upgrades and new ship systems), in JnG the player is forced to experiment with their weapons in order to be successful. The game has no lives, so the player can keep attempting a level until they beat it.

According to the developers, one of the reasons they chose to do a side scroller, as opposed to a vertical scroller, was so they could insert much visual humour. Players can expect to see, among other things, spacefighters with knives strapped to them and various humorous signs. They can also expect most of the weapons in the weapon shop have advertising posters, emblazoned with messages such as "Ultimate destructive power!" or "As seen on TV!". Also, cultural references are scattered throughout the game, both in the equipment and the actual levels.

In November 2012, Rake in Grass applied to Steam Greenlight system to add Jets'n'Guns Gold to Steam. A year later the game was accepted, with a scheduled release on 5 February 2014.

=== Soundtrack ===
The soundtrack was composed and performed by Machinae Supremacy. The band created over 50 minutes of original music for the game in a variety of styles. The band provides downloads on their site containing the game soundtrack – however the song "Hero" is available separately — in MP3 and Ogg format.

== Reception ==
Reception

Review score
Publication	Score
Inside Mac Games	9/10
