= GFI Russia =

Russian video game developer

GFI Russia is a Russian video game developer. It was founded in 1996 as MiST Land South by a group of friends and located in Zelenograd, Moscow. It was purchased in 2003 by Game Factory Interactive and reorganized into GFI Russia in 2006.

MiST Land South was chosen by Game Factory Interactive (GFI) to develop the next two installments in the Jagged Alliance series: Jagged Alliance 3 and Jagged Alliance 3D. The developer MiST Land South hasn't completed the development because of Strategy First (the owners of the Jagged Alliance intellectual property), which had withdrawn the license from GFI.

== Games ==
=== MiST Land South ===
MiST Land South released three strategy games since its inception:

- History of Wars: Napoleon (2000)
- Paradise Cracked (2002)
- Cops 2170: The Power of Law (2004)
  - Cops 2170: The Power of Law – Police Stories (2004)
- Alfa: Antiterror (2005)

=== GFI Russia ===
- Gluc'Oza: Action! (2007)
- Hired Guns: The Jagged Edge (2007) (previously titled Jagged Alliance 3D and Jazz: Hired Guns)
- 4th Batalion (cancelled in 2007)
- Warfare (2008)
