= Jagged Alliance (video game) =

1995 video game

- Developers: Madlab Software; Cypronia (DS)
- Publishers: Sir-Tech: NA: Empire Interactive (DS); EU: Cypronia (DS)
- Producer: Linda Currie
- Designers: Ian Currie; Linda Currie; Shaun Lyng
- Programmers: Ian Currie; Alex Meduna
- Artist: Mohanned Mansour
- Writer: Shaun Lyng
- Composer: Steve Wener
- Series: Jagged Alliance
- Platforms: MS-DOS, Nintendo DS
- Release: MS-DOS; April 1995; Nintendo DS: NA: 5 May 2009; EU: 26 June 2009; DSiWare: EU: 21 July 2011
- Genres: Tactical role-playing, turn-based tactics
- Mode: Single-player

Jagged Alliance is a 1995 tactical role-playing game, developed by Madlab Software, and published by Sir-Tech for MS-DOS. The game focuses on players leading a team of mercenaries as they work together to liberate an island, a former nuclear testing site, that provides a remarkable medicinal sap, which a former assistant of a research team seeks to profit from. Players have access to a wide variety of mercenaries and equipment, and must micro-manage security, harvesting, alongside exploring and securing each part of the game's setting.

Jagged Alliance received positive reviews from critics and proved a commercial success, spawning the Jagged Alliance series. The game was re-released in 2008 on GOG.com and in 2010 on GamersGate, both with Windows support, while an adapted version for Nintendo DS was released in 2009.

== Gameplay ==
The player starts the game and every following day in a room. Here the player can load and save the game, change settings, hire new mercenaries or sleep until the next day.

=== Map screen ===
When the player starts a new day, the game is transferred to a screen displaying Metavira on a square grid. The map includes information such as the number of Fallow trees in each sector, whether the sector is enemy or player controlled, how many guards and tappers are in a sector and the terrain information. The player can also decide what mercenaries and equipment to take and what player-owned sector to start from.

Mercenaries, guards, and tappers need to be paid; if needed, the player can raise the guards' and tappers' salaries to make them happier. Mercenaries can be left at the base to either heal, train skills or repair items. Occasionally, Jack or Brenda Richards contact the player with an important objective, such as securing a clean water source. These requests can be ignored but usually cause some kind of hindrance to the player at a later date.

=== Tactical screen ===
When the player has chosen the mercenaries and equipment to take to the mission, he is taken to the sector he chose earlier overseeing his mercenaries from a top-down viewpoint. The player can now directly command his chosen mercenaries and issue movement orders. The player may move the mercenaries to one adjacent sector. The player is limited to a single save slot during the day.

When player characters and enemies are in the same sector, the game switches to turn-based play. Both sides take turns to move and perform actions, which uses their action points. The number of action points is determined by the character's attributes. Tougher terrain surfaces on the ground use up greater numbers of action points. Interrupts are possible. Mercenaries can also crouch to make themselves a smaller target or take cover behind objects. It is possible to walk backwards and move stealthily so the mercenary can avoid being noticed by the enemy, though both of these actions uses more action points than normal moving.

When attacking, there is a certain chance that the mercenary will hit. The chance to hit is also affected by the number of action points the player uses to aim. Attacks can be done in a wide variety of ways, using firearms, close combat weapons like knives, throwing weapons such as hand grenades and explosive devices like land mines. When the day ends mercenaries return to the base for sleep. The day can also end during a battle and mercenaries might suffer additional injuries as they retreat from the enemy sector. The sector is conquered when all the enemies are killed or is lost when all the player's mercenaries, guards, and tappers are killed or otherwise neglected from posting guards.

=== Characters ===
The main characters in the game are the hireable mercenaries along with other non-player characters (NPCs), such as the player's employers Jack and Brenda Richards, and the main antagonist, Lucas Santino. There are also four native characters that might be offered to the player as guides. The player can only control the mercenaries. Guards, tappers and enemies are controlled by the artificial intelligence (AI).

=== Mercenaries ===
There are 60 hireable mercenaries and the player can recruit up to eight mercenaries at a time. Some mercenaries will refuse to join at start, as they want to see if the player can be trusted to lead them, either through acceptable performance or enough days on the island.

Every mercenary has four attributes - health, agility, dexterity, wisdom, and four skills - medical, explosives, mechanical and marksmanship. Health determines the amount of damage a mercenary can take, agility determines how many action points they have, dexterity helps in using weapons and other items in their various conditions, wisdom enables mercenaries to get experience quicker, medical helps to heal wounded characters, explosives helps to disarm bombs and activate the mercenary's own explosives, mechanical helps to pick locks and combine items together, and marksmanship helps to get a better aim and shot on enemies. The mercenaries employed by the player gain experience from the actions they perform. For example, a mercenary that bandages a wound might improve his medical skill. Mercenaries may also permanently lose attribute points from an injury. For example, a hit in the head might reduce mercenary's wisdom or a hit in the leg might reduce his agility.

Additionally, every mercenary has an experience level that determines how much he gets paid; and when a new level is obtained they demand a raise that the player either has to agree to, or lose the mercenary.

Each character has a number of health points. When a mercenary is injured he slowly bleeds losing health points; bandaging the wound stops the bleeding. This gives the mercenary temporary 'bandage points' that change back to health points over time, but may be quickly lost if the mercenary is injured again. Of course, mercenaries who die are permanently dead and cannot be revived or replaced.

Each mercenary has a unique personality. There are several characters that are not fond of certain other mercenaries, and can decline joining the player's team for this reason. Some characters can still be hired but will later complain about the other mercenary. Either mercenary may leave the player's group during the night and is shown to be missing on the A.I.M. site. There are also stubborn characters that might refuse to move until an enemy they were targeting has been killed or the enemy moves out of the mercenary's line of sight.

=== Equipment ===
There is a large variety of items in the game - some of them play a significant role in the plot while others are there for use.

When the player hires a mercenary he arrives with weapons and equipment. The player can equip the mercenary with various body armour, helmets, goggles, and radios. There are standard vests that have pockets along with vests with no pockets that act as body armor. The vests with pockets may have two to five pockets and each one can hold either one particular item or a number of identical items like magazines or hand grenades. Mercenaries can also carry things in their hands.

The player can store an unlimited number of items in the base, but has to transport them with the mercenaries from the sectors to the base.

== Plot ==
In 1952, nuclear testing is conducted on the island of Metavira in the South Atlantic ocean. In 1995, a research team led by scientist Brenda Richards and her father Jack discovers the island's trees were mutated by the radiation from the nuclear blasts. Despite being unable to reproduce, the trees, named Fallow Trees, are found to produce a unique sap with remarkable medicinal properties. The Richards promptly work to establish a harvesting operation to secure more sap, aided by Brenda's assistant Lucas Santino. Unknown to the pair, Santino discovers that the sap's potential could make him wealthy if he has sole control over it.

A few months later, Santino secretly sabotages Brenda's lab and destroys much of her research, whereupon he uses the incident to convince Jack to let him establish a second science team. The Richards realize too late what Santino is doing, and watch as he uses mercenaries to take over Metavira by force. Seeking to stop this and prevent him abusing the sap for his own gains, Jack and Brenda make contact with the player and offer them funds to recruit their own mercenaries and liberate the island. Recruiting a team from the Association of International Mercenaries (A.I.M.), the player begins by recovering a stolen component from the harvesting operation that Santino's men had taken.

Upon learning of the Richards hiring outside help to fight him back, Santino orders his men to prevent this, leading to guerrilla combat across the island and attempts by Santino's men to sabotage the Richards' efforts. Despite this, the A.I.M. mercenaries fight back, reclaiming every sector of the island, ultimately cornering Santino in his base, whereupon they promptly kill him and end his tyranny. The game's ending at this point is impacted by what actions the player took on certain events, including the kidnapping of Brenda, which influences Jack's congratulation of the player and their team.

== Nintendo DS version ==
On 26 August 2008, Empire Interactive announced that a Nintendo DS version was in development by Strategy First Inc. and Cypron Studios. The game was originally announced for release on 17 February 2009, but was later pushed back to 5 May 2009 in America, and 26 June 2009 in Europe.

The game differs in many ways from the DOS version. Graphics have a smaller scale and a very different texture on the sector maps. There are completely new music tracks and improved cinematic cutscenes. Features removed include item repairs, item conditions, bandage points, moving backwards, door manipulation closeups and deadly eels in the water.

== Reception ==
Reception

Review scores
| Publication | Score |
|---|---|
| Computer Gaming World | 4.5/5 |
| Next Generation | 3/5 |
| PC Gamer (UK) | 82/100 |
| PC Gamer (US) | 89% |
| PCMag | 4/4 |

Jagged Alliance was a commercial success. According to William R. Trotter of PC Gamer US, "JA won plaudits from the critics and became the best-selling non-Wizardry title in Sirtech's history." That magazine's Marc Saltzman similarly noted that Jagged Alliance "sold reasonably well" and received critical acclaim.

Next Generation reviewed the PC version of the game, and stated "don't expect a deep roleplaying experience from this one – but if you're looking for an entertaining mix of RPG and strategy, grab it." Rating the game four stars out of four, PC Magazine said that "Jagged Alliance serves up a unique blend of gaming elements that combine to form one of the most enjoyably addictive games to hit the shelves in a long, long time".

The editors of Computer Games Strategy Plus named Jagged Alliance the best turn-based strategy game of 1995, tied with Heroes of Might and Magic: A Strategic Quest. In 1996, Computer Gaming World declared Jagged Alliance the 114th best computer game ever released.

== Reviews ==
- Australian Realms #25
