= Jagged Alliance 2 =

1999 video game

- Developer: Sir-Tech Canada (Note: Ported to Linux by Tribsoft)
- Publishers: NA: TalonSoft (Note: Linux version published by Titan Computer); EU: TopWare Interactive
- Director: Ian Currie
- Producer: Ian Currie
- Designers: Ian Currie; Shaun Lyng; Linda Currie
- Programmer: Andrew T. Emmons
- Artist: Scot Loving
- Writer: Shaun Lyng
- Composer: Kevin Manthei
- Series: Jagged Alliance
- Platforms: Windows, Linux, OS X
- Release: Windows: GER: April 19, 1999; NA: July 23, 1999; EU: August 6, 1999; Linux; February 26, 2001; OS X November 15, 2013
- Genres: Tactical role-playing, turn-based tactics
- Mode: Single-player

Jagged Alliance 2 is a 1999 tactical role-playing game developed by Sir-Tech Canada for Microsoft Windows and later ported to Linux by Tribsoft. It is the third entry in the Jagged Alliance series. The game was followed by the expansion pack Unfinished Business in 2000. Two commercial versions of the mod Wildfire were released in 2004 in the form of expansion packs. The core game and the Unfinished Business expansion were combined and re-released under the title of Jagged Alliance 2 Gold Pack in 2002.

The game takes place in the fictional Latin American country of Arulco, which has been ruled by the ruthless Queen Deidranna for several years. The player is tasked with defeating Deidranna and restoring peace to Arulco. To this end, the player may hire mercenaries and enlist the help of local citizens, who can help the player in a variety of ways, such as providing useful information or joining the fight against Deidranna.

The game was commercially successful; Pelit estimated its sales at 300,000 units by 2006. However, it sold poorly in the United States. The game received good reviews which praised its freedom of choice, large and memorable cast of characters, non-linearity, and tactical gameplay.

== Gameplay ==
Screenshot of Jagged Alliance 2: Gold showing a battle in progress on the tactical screen

The game uses a strategic map screen of Arulco where the player can issue high level strategic orders to their troops, such as travelling between sectors and training militia. Most of the game's combat and sector exploration take place on a tactical screen, where the player can issue individual direct commands to each of their mercenaries, such as moving, shooting, and talking. The game features a wide variety of firearms, body armor and miscellaneous items that the player may use to their advantage.

The map screen displays the world map of Arulco in a square grid (called sectors) and the forces deployed by the enemy and the player. This is the strategic side of the game, as the player directs his forces, and controls the progress of time, which may be sped up or paused. From here, the player can access the game's laptop function, allowing the player to receive emails from characters, buy weapons and equipment, and hire and fire mercenaries. This screen is used to give mercenaries tasks. Mercs with a medical kit and medical skill can be set to tend to wounded mercs; this significantly quickens their recovery. Mercs with a tool box and mechanical skill can be set to repair damaged weapons, tools and armour. Mercs can practice a skill by themselves or work as a trainer or student. Training a student increases their chosen skill. A trainer may train local citizens to become militia to defend sectors while the mercs are away. Mercs can be ordered to travel on foot between the sectors. If the player acquires a ground or aerial vehicle in-game, they may load their troops into it to travel between sectors much faster.

There is a tactical screen, where the player takes control of individual mercenaries during real-time interactions and turn-based combat. The tactical screen shows a sector from an isometric viewpoint. Here the player can view the terrain, explore buildings and find items. Although the game does not feature a visual fog of war, the non-player characters (NPCs) can only be seen if a player-controlled or allied character sees them. The game time advances in real-time on the tactical screen unless a battle is initiated, then the game switches to a turn-based combat mode. The player can control an individual merc or group of mercs, issuing move, communication and various interaction commands. Mercs can run, walk, swim, crouch or crawl. Mercs may climb onto the roofs of flat-roofed buildings.

Battles occur whenever the player's and enemy forces occupy the same sector. The game proceeds in real-time until a member of one force spots an enemy. The game then switches to turn-based play. Each force takes alternating turns to move, attack, and perform various other actions. Each character has a limited number of action points, which are spent to perform actions. The action points are renewed at the beginning of each round, depending on the physical state of the merc. Some unspent action points will be carried over to the next round. If a combatant has some action points left over during the enemy's turn and spots an enemy, they stand a chance of interrupting the enemy turn and performing actions.

Mercs can attack enemies in many different ways. Firearms such as handguns, machine guns, rifles, close combat and thrown weapons like knives and hand grenades, heavy weapons such as mortars, rocket-propelled grenades and light anti-tank weapons and explosives like mines, and bombs. When a merc attacks, they have a certain chance to hit the target depending on the appropriate skill, obstacles in the line of fire and the number of action points spent aiming. Walls, doors, and many objects can be destroyed using explosives or heavy weapons. Some battles may be automatically resolved if the player chooses to do so.

The game may be played using stealth elements. Mercs may move either in normal or stealth mode. In stealth mode, the merc attempts to move without making any noise. Moving stealthily costs more action points, but may successfully hide their position from enemies. The game features weapons that do not cause loud noise and camouflage kits, which when used may disguise the merc in their environment. Merc attributes and some special skills affect how stealthy they are.

The game features a large array of various items. These include weapons, armour, tools and miscellaneous items. Items can be traded between mercs, picked up, dropped or thrown. If a merc dies, they drop all their items. Enemies will sometimes drop items upon dying. Mercs can be hired with their own combat equipment. As the game progresses, the online shop offers a larger and better variety of weapons, armour and tools for sale. Mercenaries can equip and carry various items in their inventory. The mercs can wear armour on their head, chest and legs. Certain skills and interactions require a certain tool or object to be held in the hand. The mercs can hold one large weapon or dual wield two small weapons. Weapons may be improved via special attachments, for instance a silencer or bipod.

The player needs money to pay the mercenary hire fees and to purchase equipment. At the start of the game, the player is given a set amount of money. The main source of income in the game are silver and gold mines located in several towns. The player has to reclaim these town sectors and convince the local miners to work for the player to receive a daily income. Weaponry, equipment and miscellaneous items may be sold to local merchants.

Although the player is directed by rebels to head to Drassen first, the player may choose to capture the towns and explore the countryside in any order they desire. It is not required to capture any towns. Additionally, almost every sector may be entered via two or more entry points. The player may choose between a very large array of different mercs, allowing combinations for specific purposes – e.g. stealth combat, night combat, close-quarters combat and so on. The game features random treasure chests, characters and certain events that differ from game to game.

=== Characters ===
The characters in Jagged Alliance 2 are mercenaries, enemies, allies and the townsfolk; many of the NPC characters may be interacted with.

The game is played almost entirely through the mercenaries chosen. Mercenaries can be hired from private military company websites, or recruited from the local citizenry. The player may create one personalized, unique mercenary.

Characters are defined by their skills expressed in character points. Every character has an experience level, five attributes (agility, dexterity, strength, leadership, wisdom) and four skills (marksmanship, explosives, mechanical, medical). A character's level is increased by actively participating in the game. Skills are increased by performing actions based on these skills or by training. Attribute points may be lost if a character is critically wounded. Apart from this, a mercenary can have two (or one highly developed) special skills enhancing a certain aspect of his or her performance such as night operations, or lockpicking.

Each character has a certain number of health points, which are reduced when they take damage. Wounds can be bandaged by using first aid kits. This prevents the character from bleeding and losing more health but does not restore health points. A wounded mercenary is given less action points proportionally to their wounds. Health can be restored by resting, being treated by another mercenary with 'doctor'-'patient' pair of commands or visiting a hospital. When a mercenary runs very low on health, the character falls to the ground slowly dying, unable to do anything until medically treated. If a character dies, they cannot be resurrected.

Characters have an energy level, restored by sleep, rest, fluids or injections. Moving, using stealth and getting hit saps energy. Tired mercs who have not rested for a long time become exhausted faster. Exhausted characters will fall to the ground until they regain some energy.

Mercenaries have a morale level, mainly increased by victories and successful kills and decreased by the opposite. Happy mercs perform better, while unhappy mercs will complain and may leave the player's forces altogether.

Mercs who like each other and work together will have a higher morale than others. Mercenaries who dislike each other will complain often and eventually one of the two mercenaries will quit. Mercenaries may refuse to be hired if the player has already hired someone they dislike.

== Plot ==
=== Setting ===
Jagged Alliance 2 takes place within the fictional country of Arulco, a South American nation which is run by an autocratic government. Originally, the country operated on a unique democratic monarchy system after it gained independence - one in which the people voted between two major families, the Chivaldoris and the Cordonas, determining which candidate from each family will run as monarch for a ten year term. The country consists of several towns and villages, farms, mountains, forests, beaches, swamps and jungles, with Arulco's economy dependent mainly on mining - the country maintaining vast underground deposits of gold and silver.

The game sees players recruiting a variety of different mercenaries, a mixture of returning members from Jagged Alliance and several brand new ones for Jagged Alliance 2, who can be recruited from the Association of International Mercenaries (A.I.M.), and More Economic Recruiting Center (M.E.R.C.) - the latter a rival company founded by two former A.I.M. mercenaries.

=== Synopsis ===
In 1988, Enrico Chivaldori, son of the current reigning monarch, marries Deidranna Reitman, an attractive woman from Romania, in order to win over voters and be elected the new monarch of Arulco. A year after his election, Deidranna murders his father frames him for the crime. Before Enrico can be executed, his opponent in the election, Miguel Cordona, leads rebel forces to rescue him; Enrico uses this to fake his death and go into exile. Assuming he is dead, Deidranna abolishes elections and assumes control, hiring foreign soldiers to enforce her rule.

Over the next ten years, Deidranna's tyranny sees her profiting from the country's deposits of precious metals while the people suffer under her. To combat this, Miguel leads rebel forces to combat her troops, but by 1998, they face a losing battle after Miguel's hometown is raided by Arulco's army. Learning of this, Enrico contacts the legendary mercenary leader "Boss" (the player), due to their actions a few years ago on the island of Metavira. Enrico provides them an advance payment to hire mercenaries, hoping they can provide aid to Miguel, and liberate Arulco from Deidranna by killing her.

Recruiting a team of mercenaries, the Boss leads their team to take back Omerta, impressing Miguel. After helping him to secure supplies from a neighbouring town - as well as to secure it's mine to provide a source of funding - Miguel provides additional support (including members of his group that can join the team), while the team find additional allies to assist in their mission. As the team begin liberating towns and mines from Deidranna's control, she attempts to fight back, becoming increasingly frustrated as the mercenaries and Miguel's rebels begin winning against her forces.

Eventually, the Boss' mercenaries leads an assault against Deidranna's elite forces in Aruclo's capital, where despite heavy defences, they find and kill Deidranna under the palace following a fierce battle. Arulco's citizens quickly rejoice as their nightmare is over, with Enrico returning to the country to put its affairs in order. In a speech held in the capital, Enrico honors Miguel's efforts, either by naming him as Arulco's new monarch if he is alive, or having a memorial built for him if he died. Following the speech, the Boss and their team are airlifted out of the country to enjoy their success.

=== Sci-Fi mode ===
If the player opts to begin a game with Sci Fi mode, then as part of the campaign, Deidranna decides to vent her frustration on Arulco by ordering the release of the "Crepitus" – a species of giant insects that live underground – to instill fear into the populace. After the order is given, the player's team is notified by one of the mine's managers of the situation and forced to fight off against the Crepitus, eventually tracking down their lair and destroying it to end the threat and resume their war on Deidranna.

== Development ==
In an interview with Game.EXE during the game's development, SirTech noted an intention to preserve freedom of movement, character relationships and flexible storyline from the previous title. Among the new features discussed were a real-time mode and player own character's generation. In a later interview during game's alpha release, the game's designer Ian Currie noted the addition of role-playing and strategy elements compared to the previous title. He explained that – while the tactical game mode was well suited for multiplayer – it would not be implemented because the non-linear story and role-playing elements did not suit it. The developers explained the game being delayed due to heavy improvements in the game engine, graphics and the creation of a detailed world, and originally expected to release in October 1998. Currie explains the game engine had several ground-up rewrites and that significant time was spent on the game's physics and projectile ballistics, as well as the creation of the non-linear storyline.

A demo of the game, containing a unique map named Demoville, was released in the summer of 1998 through distribution with various gaming magazines.

An open source AmigaOS 4 port was released on June 28, 2008.

== Reception ==
=== Sales ===
Jagged Alliance 2 became a commercial success and, according to designer Ian Currie, was the second-largest hit published by TalonSoft. By October 1999, Udo Hoffman of PC Player reported that its sales had surpassed 100,000 units in Germany and that distributor TopWare was pleased with the returns. It debuted at #1 in April 1999 on Germany's computer game sales charts and held the position the following month, before falling to ninth in June. It claimed 14th for July. However, the game flopped in North America: PC Data reported sales of 24,000 for Jagged Alliance II through the end of 1999. The editors of GameSpot nominated it for their 1999 "Best Game No One Played" award, which ultimately went to Disciples: Sacred Lands. Regarding Jagged Alliance 2's global sales, Pelit's Niko Nirvi reported that "estimates of sales bounced between 150,000–500,000." He remarked that team member Chris Camfield placed its sales at 300,000 units by 2006, a figure that Nirvi said "sounds credible".

=== Critical reviews ===
Reception

Aggregate score
Aggregator	Score
GameRankings	85.09%

Review scores
Publication	Score
Computer Gaming World	4.5/5
GameSpot	8.8/10
IGN	8.5/10
PC Gamer (UK)	83/100
PC Gamer (US)	74/100
PC Zone	80/100
Computer Games Magazine	5/5

Jagged Alliance 2 received a score of 85.09% from review aggregation website GameRankings. GameSpot praised its non-linear gameplay, freedom of action and variety of tactics and mercenary character traits, while IGN highlighted its story-telling and role-playing, detailed world, challenging opponents and excellent audio. Computer Gaming World presented the game Editor's Choice award, and Jeff Green described it as a hardcore game, praising its selection of mercenaries, replay value and combat planning, although noted AI was not very intelligent and graphics were not strong.

Jagged Alliance 2 was a finalist for Computer Games Strategy Plus', GameSpot's and Computer Gaming World's 1999 "Strategy Game of the Year" awards, which it lost to RollerCoaster Tycoon, Age of Empires II: The Age of Kings and Homeworld, respectively. It was also nominated in GameSpot's "Best Sound" and "Best Game No One Played" categories. The editors of Computer Games wrote, "Sirtech's amazing hybrid of detailed tactical strategy and role-playing delivered the goods. How many real-time games have this much tension?"

== Legacy ==
After the release of the original Jagged Alliance 2, two sequels and various mods have been released, including a prequel titled Jagged Alliance: Flashback which was released on Steam in October 2014.

=== Unfinished Business ===
Jagged Alliance 2: Unfinished Business, alternatively known as Jagged Alliance 2.5 is a short, mission-based standalone sequel released by Sir-Tech on December 5, 2000. This release adds some tweaks to the combat engine, as well as a scenario editor. The gameplay remains largely unchanged.

A new plot is introduced in Unfinished Business. The original owners of Arulco's lucrative mines have returned and established a missile base on the nearby island of Tracona, demanding that the mines be returned to them. They destroy the Arulco's now empty Tixa prison as a show of force if their demands are not met. The player must put together a team of mercenaries to infiltrate Tracona and disable the missile base. Alternatively, the player may choose to use the characters from a previously saved Jagged Alliance 2: Gold savegame. Unfinished Business is notably harder than the original.

The sequel appears to be rushed as the gameplay is virtually the same as the original's, the play-time of Unfinished Business is much shorter, and the plot is linear and thus lacks replay value. Sir-Tech was experiencing financial problems at the time, most significantly trouble finding a publisher.

=== Gold Pack ===
Jagged Alliance 2: Gold Pack was published by Strategy First on August 6, 2002 and adds the improvements of Unfinished Business to the final release of Jagged Alliance 2. The Unfinished Business and a scenario editor are included in the package.

Gold Pack introduces notable changes to the difficulty setting. The player choosing an advanced difficulty level may decide to make the player turns timed and whether to disallow saving during combat, as opposed to the original Jagged Alliance 2, which set these settings automatically.

As of July 2006 it is available via the Steam content delivery system, as well as Turner Broadcasting's GameTap.

=== Wildfire ===
Jagged Alliance 2: Wildfire was published by i-Deal Games in 2004 as an official expansion pack by Strategy First. The game's source code was published in the package, under a license permitting non-commercial use.

Comparing to the original Jagged Alliance 2, Wildfire has not altered the game engine or controls. The focus was instead directed into designing revamped environments, new items and stronger enemies. This presents players with a more challenging campaign, however the goals and progression remain the same. In terms of the gameplay features, the game remains almost unchanged.

A renewed commercial release of Wildfire, dubbed version 6, through European publisher Zuxxez Entertainment in 2005 saw the Jagged Alliance series staying on shop shelves more than five years after the debut of its second iteration. Wild Fire version 6 contains changed sourcecode, a tweaked graphics engine that allows for a higher resolution, introduces new mercenaries and increases squad size from 6 to 10.

=== Back in Action ===
Jagged Alliance: Back in Action is a 3D remake of Jagged Alliance 2. It was developed by Coreplay and published by bitComposer and Kalypso Media in 2012. It was announced in 2010 as Jagged Alliance 2: Reloaded and renamed to Back in Action in 2011.

=== Modding and community development ===
Jagged Alliance 2: Gold has seen numerous community mods after its release and especially after the source code release. Notable examples include v1.13, Urban Chaos and Deidranna Lives.

==== JA2-Stracciatella ====
JA2-Stracciatella logo

The JA2-Stracciatella project aims to add cross platform capabilities for Jagged Alliance 2 by porting the vanilla Wildfire source code to SDL. Mac OS, Linux, Android and other source ports have since been released. The second focus of Stracciatella as an unofficial patch project is the fixing of technical errors (like buffer overflows) and the removal of technical limitations without changing the game's balancing. The last commit of project founder Tron in the project repository is r7072 from August 2010. In March 2013, the JA2-Stracciatella project was resumed by another developer and transferred to a new repository, which added support for higher resolutions and additional fixes. In March 2016, the project was continued on GitHub.

==== v1.13 ====
v1.13 is an enhanced version of Jagged Alliance 2 Gold and partial conversion mod of the game. The main change from the original code is the "externalisation" of many previously hardcoded variables to editable XML files, allowing users a great level of modding flexibility. It introduced many new features and items, as well as a multiplayer mode. In July 2007, 1.13 was successfully ported to Linux. It is also backwards-compatible with a base Jagged Alliance 2 installation.
