= Roger Keating =

Australian computer game designer

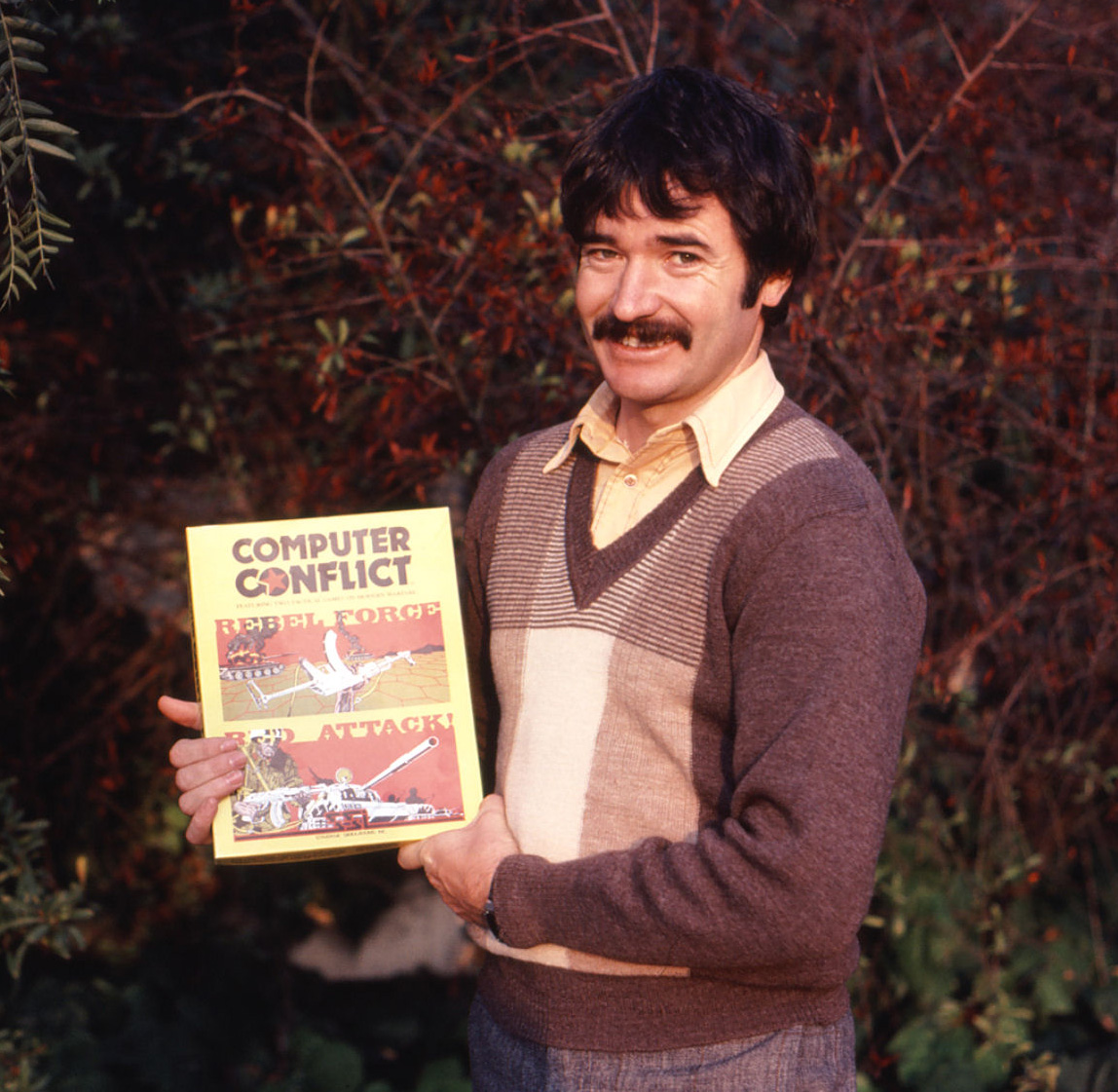
- Occupation: Video game designer
- Known for: Wargames

Roger Keating is an Australian computer game designer. Along with Ian Trout, Keating co-founded of the video game company Strategic Studies Group, which is known for its strategic war and fantasy games with artificial intelligence. Keating and Trout worked together on the majority of SSG titles.

== Early life ==
Keating was born in New Zealand. He moved to Australia in 1978 and worked as a mathematics and physics teacher.

== Career in game design ==
Keating created his first game, Conflict, in 1979. It was published by American software house Strategic Simulations. Keating left his teaching job to program full-time, and published seven games while working with SSI during 1981 and 1982. Keating later worked as a school teacher in New Zealand.

In 1983, Keating, along with Ian Trout, formed Strategic Studies Group. Gregor Whiley joined the company in 1986 for the development of BattleFront. The company created many strategy games over the following 25 years.

After Trout's death, both Keating and Whiley worked part-time at the Northern Sydney Institute for four years between 2011 and 2014 while developing their games part-time. They both moved to work for the Academy of Interactive Entertainment in 2015, where Keating taught programming.

== List of games ==
- Computer Conflict (1980)
- Operation Apocalypse (1981)
- Southern Command (1981)
- Germany 1985 (1983)
- RDF 1985 (1983)
- Reach for the Stars (1983)
- Baltic 1985: Corridor to Berlin (1984)
- Carriers at War (1984)
- Norway 1985 (1985)
- Europe Ablaze (1985)
- Battlefront
- Russia: The Great War in the East 1941-1945 (1987)
- Halls of Montezuma: A Battle History of the U.S. Marine Corps (1987)
- Rommel: Battles for North Africa (1988)
- Decisive Battles of the American Civil War Volume 1: Bull Run to Chancellorsville (1988)
- Decisive Battles of the American Civil War Volume 2: Gaines Mill to Chattanooga (1988)
- Decisive Battles of the American Civil War Volume 3: Wilderness to Nashville (1988)
- Gold of the Americas (1989)
- Panzer Battles (1990)
- MacArthur's War: Battles for Korea (1990)
- Warlords (1990)
- Carriers at War (1992)
- Carriers at War: Construction Kit (1993)
- Carriers at War II (1993)
- Warlords II (1993)
- Warlords II Scenario Builder (1994)
- Warlords II Deluxe (1995)
- Decisive Battles of WWII: The Ardennes Offensive (1997)
- Warlords III: Reign of Heroes (1997)
- Warlords III: Darklords Rising (1998)
- Warlords Battlecry (2000)
- Warlords Battlecry II (2002)
- Decisive Battles of WWII: Korsun Pocket (2003)
- Decisive Battles of WWII: Battles in Normandy (2004)
- Decisive Battles of WWII: Battles in Italy (2005)
- Battlefront (2007)
- Kharkov: Disaster on the Donets (2008)
