= John De Margheriti =

Australian entrepreneur

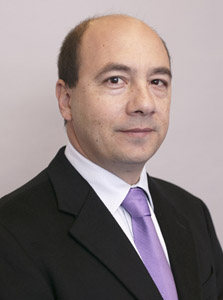
- De Margheriti pictured in July 2008
- Born: July 1962 (age 64); Rome, Italy
- Education: Hawker College
- Alma mater: UNSW Sydney
- Occupations: Electrical engineer, Software developer and entrepreneur
- Known for: Interactive video gaming development in Australia
- Title: Executive Chairman, Academy of Interactive Entertainment; Chairman, Canberra Technology Park; Founder and former CEO, BigWorld Pty Limited; Founder, Micro Forté Pty Limited
- Spouse: Vicki De Margheriti
- Awards: Honorary Ambassador for Canberra; Winner, Benson Entrepreneur iAward, 2014

John De Margheriti (born July 1962) is an Italian-born Australian electrical engineer, software developer and entrepreneur. De Margheriti is an experienced interactive entertainment and film business executive.

He is the founder and former CEO of BigWorld Pty Limited and the founder of parent company Micro Forté Pty Limited. De Margheriti is also the Executive Chairman of the Academy of Interactive Entertainment, the Chairman of Canberra Technology Park, the founder of the Game Developers' Association of Australia, the founder of the Australian Game Developers Conference, the founder of the three Canberra business parks, the co-founder of Dreamgate Studios, the co-founder of Game Plus. In later year he co-founded a number of film related entries such as Film Plus, The Film Distillery and DEMS Entertainment.

== Early years ==
Born in Rome, Italy, De Margheriti arrived in Canberra with his family in 1970. He experimented with CB radios and electronics early as a young teenager. When he was sixteen De Margheriti experimented with making computer games independently. During his senior years at Hawker College, De Margheriti co-created an amateur 8 millimetres (0.31 in) science fiction film after watching the 1977 film, Star Wars: Episode IV – A New Hope. During the development of his amateur film, he co-developed a robotics system entitled 3DIM that would enable him to film complex stop-motion animation footage of large scale spaceship models. De Margheriti's need to create scrolling film credits led him to discover computers as a tool. The film involved dozens of actors and as a result, De Margheriti gained his first taste in management working with actors and prop builders. During filming he met Steve Wang which would later form the basis of a longstanding business association. He wrote his first computer game called “Maze” on a PDP-11 and his peer, Steve Wang developed a computer game called “Caves”, also on a PDP-11 computer.

De Margheriti graduated with a degree in electrical engineering from the UNSW Sydney (UNSW), and holds an MBA from Sydney University. Wang also went on to study at UNSW in the field of computer science. Together they devoted much of their time during university hours to developing computer games. They pooled their money to purchase a Commodore PET. During this time John also met Stephen Lewis and he joined the group, helping make games on the Commodore PET.

Whilst working part-time at the Computer 1 computer store in Randwick to put himself through university, De Margheriti met Gerry Gerlach who was interested in finding a person who could develop a computer game based on the recent Australian win of the Americas Cup 12 metres (39 ft) sailing. After a conversation with Gerlach, De Margheriti approached his friends at the university and pulled together a team including Wang, Stephen Lewis and John Reidy capable of developing the simulation game. The team spent 72 hours straight developing a demo, pitched it to Armchair Entertainment and won a contract to develop the Americas Cup Sailing Simulation game for the Commodore 64 and Amstrad which was ultimately developed and then sold to Electronic Arts. This was the first sports game published by EA.

Soon after starting to develop their first game, Wang and Lewis told De Margheriti that his true strength was not programming but managing and winning new projects.

In addition to the Americas Cup Sailing Simulation, De Margheriti went on to program two other of games for Electronic Arts including Demon Stalkers and Fireking for the Commodore 64 and IBM PC, which was later released by Sydney-based Strategic Studies Group. http://www.ssg.com.au/

=== Micro Forte Pty Limited ===
Between 1985 and 1988, De Margheriti turned his focus towards business negotiations and contract development. He co-founded a games development company called Micro Forté Pty Limited and wrote games for a new company called Electronic Arts.

In 1995 De Margheriti came up with the concept of developing a software solution that would somehow group bulletin board services (BBS) together so that many people could play games together. He called this concept Game Net. Game Net was a precursor to what would later become known as BigWorld Technology. De Margheriti's idea was to allow large scale Multi User Dungeons [MUDs] to be developed where hundreds of people could be playing together in a multiplayer game. He was greatly influenced by an EA friend Danielle/Dan Bunten who had designed M.U.L.E, Modem Wars as well as a game called Command HQ which he often played with Stephen Lewis. On the 13th September 1995 Stephen Lewis and John lodged patents for a Communication System and Method, and invented the concept of Massively Multiplayer Online Games (MMOGs). John made the decision to build a middleware engine called BigWorld that would help developers deal with the complexities of creating these online games. In 1999 John lodged an application for funding through AusIndustry's R&D Start program and received a multimillion-dollar grant. This was subsequently matched by venture capital from Allen & Buckeridge, an Australian Venture capital firm. The name of “Large Scale Multi Player Universe” (LSMPU) was originally used to describe the server, client and tools middleware system that De Margheriti had in mind, as the term MMO did not exist. In 2011 the Micro Forte company acquired all the shares from the venture capital company.

=== The Academy of Interactive Entertainment ===
in 1995 De Margheriti established the Academy of Interactive Entertainment (AIE) as a business unit of Micro Forté, to focus on developing 3D animation skills. A course was initially taught by De Margheriti, Steve Wang and other 3D experts was created for a group of 10 students.

Later on in 1996 it was spun out as a separate non profit organisation called the Academy of Interactive Entertainment Limited (AIE), the world's first non-profit game school, to assist the greater games industry. The AIE now has campuses in Canberra, Sydney, Melbourne, Online, Adelaide, Seattle, and Lafayette.

== Published games ==
Title	Release date	Publisher	Format(s)	Genre	Notes
The Official America's Cup Sailing Simulation	1986	Electronic Arts (EA) and US Gold	C64/128 and Amstrad		
Demon Stalkers – The Raid on Doomfane	1987	EA	C64/128 and IBM PC		
Fire King	1989	Strategic Studies Group	C64/128 and IBM PC		
Bombs Away	1997	Emu Multimedia		Children's game	
Nordice	1997	Emu Multimedia	Windows 95/98	Children's game	
Roy Morgan's Ultimate Survey	1997	Emu Multimedia	Board Game	Family board game 250 question cards	
Hot Wheels Bash Arena	2002 (USA); 2003 (Australia)	THQ	PC/CD ROM		
KWARI	2007	KWARI Limited	Multiplayer Online Kwari		
