= Micro Forté =

Australian electronic entertainment company

Micro Forté Pty Ltd
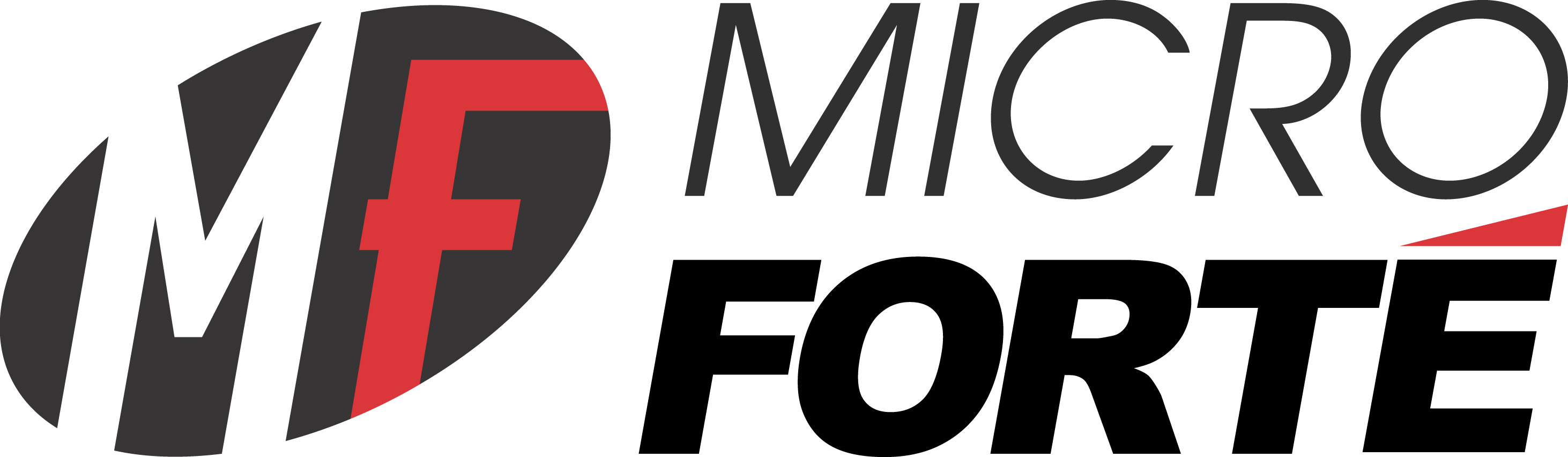
- Company type: Private
- Industry: Video games
- Founded: Canberra, Australia (1985)
- Headquarters: Canberra, Australia
- Key people: John De Margheriti (CEO)
- Number of employees: ~40 (2008)
- Website: www.microforte.com

Micro Forté Pty Ltd is an Australian electronic entertainment company with development studios in Canberra and Sydney. Founded in 1985 by John De Margheriti at a time when there was little game development presence in Australia, Micro Forté has been closely linked to the growth of the Australian game development industry, with CEO De Margheriti initiating events such as the Australian Game Developers Conference (AGDC) and founding the Academy of Interactive Entertainment (AIE).

Micro Forté is primarily a developer of massively multiplayer online games and virtual world content.

== History ==
Micro Forté's first title developed for Electronic Arts and released in 1986 was the America's Cup Sailing Simulation for the Commodore 64 platform. Their second title also developed for Electronic Arts, Demon Stalkers was well received following its release in 1987. The sequel Fire King was published by SSG Strategic Studies Group in 1989.

For a number of years the company pursued other activities outside the arena of game development, returning in 1994 to game development creating two children's titles Nordice and Bombs Away. Micro Forté then developed titles for other international publishers including Enemy Infestation (Panasonic/Ripcord), HotWheels Bash Arena (THQ), and Fallout Tactics: Brotherhood of Steel (Interplay). Their most widely known title, Fallout Tactics: Brotherhood of Steel was published by Interplay and was a squad based tactical game based on the Fallout (video game) universe, and achieved scores between 80 and 90 from reviewers and fans alike.

== Development of BigWorld Technology ==
In 1994 when Micro Forté returned to game development, the company began work on Massively Multiplayer Online Games (MMOG) technology. The research and development work was supported with a grant from the Australian Government and venture capital received through Allen & Buckeridge.

Micro Forté spent a number of years concentrating their efforts on developing a technology capable of supporting multiple platforms with more players able to participate in limitless worlds and in the same space. The culmination of years of research and development resulted in BigWorld Technology, which is now a separate commercial company.

The BigWorld company was formed in 1999 and the BigWorld Technology Suite was commercialised and launched in 2002.

== List of works ==
- America's Cup Challenge (C-64, Amstrad, Electronic Arts)
- Demon Stalkers (C-64, PC, Electronic Arts)
- Fire King (C-64, PC, SSG)
- Nordice (PC game, Emu Multimedia)
- Bombs Away (PC game, Emu Multimedia)
- Enemy Infestation (PC game, Panasonic/Ripcord)
- Kwari (PC game)
- Fallout Tactics: Brotherhood of Steel (PC game, Interplay)
- Hotwheels: Bash Arena (PC game, THQ)
- Citizen Zero (Xbox MMO for Microsoft, unpublished)
- Super Spy Online (PC MMO prototype)

== See also ==
- BigWorld Technology
