= Decisive Battles of the American Civil War Volume 1: Bull Run to Chancellorsville =

1988 video game

- Developer: Strategic Studies Group
- Designer: Ian Trout
- Programmer: Roger Keating
- Platforms: Apple II, Commodore 64, MS-DOS
- Release: 1988: Apple II, C64; 1990: MS-DOS
- Genre: Wargame
- Modes: Single-player, multiplayer

Decisive Battles of the American Civil War Volume 1: Bull Run to Chancellorsville is a computer wargame developed by Roger Keating and Ian Trout. It was published by Strategic Studies Group in 1988 for the Commodore 64 and Apple II, then in 1990 for MS-DOS. Two further games in the series were released: Volume 2: Gaines Mill to Chattanooga and Volume 3: Wilderness to Nashville.

== Plot ==
Bull Run to Chancellorsville is a tactical wargame in which the player takes command in the first American Civil War battles. Volume I includes six battles from the Civil War, in which two players may manage the Confederate and Union armies, or a single player can play against the computer managing the other army with the option of selecting from three handicap levels to add to each side.

== Gameplay ==
Bull Run to Chancellorsville is fully menu-driven, with its game mechanics broken down into command subsets. The game includes two Game and Design Menus as well as full-color battlefield maps. It also comes with the Warpaint and Warplan programs which the player can use to design tactical wargames.

== Development ==
Roger Keating and Ian Trout of Strategic Studies Group developed Bull Run to Chancellorsville as the first game released for their Decisive Battles series.

== Reception ==
The game was reviewed in 1988 in Dragon #135 by Hartley, Patricia, and Kirk Lesser in "The Role of Computers" column. The reviewers gave the game 4 out of 5 stars. Regan Carey and Mike Salata reviewed the game for Computer Gaming World, and stated that "Decisive Battles of the Civil War is a step up the ladder in the evolution of SSG game systems. Features like Warplan and Warpaint set it apart from most competitors."

In 1990 Computer Gaming World gave the game three-plus out of five stars, and in 1993 three stars.
