= Panzer Battles =

Panzer Battles may refer to:

- Panzer Battles (book), a 1956 memoir
- Panzer Battles (video game), a 1989 video game
