= Battlefront (disambiguation) =

A battlefront is a contested armed frontier between opposing forces.

Battlefront may also refer to:

- Battlefront (1986 video game)
- Battlefront (2007 video game)
- Battlefront.com, an American video game publisher
- Star Wars: Battlefront, a series of video games
  - Star Wars: Battlefront (2004 video game)
  - Star Wars Battlefront (2015 video game)

== See also ==
- Pokémon Battle Frontier (disambiguation)
