= War Front =

War Front may refer to:

- War Front: Turning Point, a computer game
- War Front (horse) (foaled 2002), American Thoroughbred racehorse
- Warfront, a war comic published by Harvey Comics

== See also ==
- Battlefront (disambiguation)
