= Germany 1985 =

1983 video game

- Developer: Roger Keating
- Publisher: Strategic Simulations
- Platforms: Apple II, Commodore 64
- Release: NA: 1983; EU: 1983
- Genre: Wargame
- Modes: Single-player, multiplayer

Germany 1985 is a computer wargame published in 1983 by Strategic Simulations. Developed by Roger Keating, it was the first in the "When Superpowers Collide" series, and was followed by RDF 1985, Baltic 1985: Corridor to Berlin and Norway 1985.

== Gameplay ==
The game presents the hypothetical situation of the Soviet Union invading southern and central West Germany where NATO forces must contain and repel them. The player may choose to play either the NATO or Soviet forces, and can play in turns against another human opponent or against the computer.

There are two battle scenarios. The first, called "Advance-to-Contact" involves Soviet and American forces as they rush to establish a cohesive front line. The second is "Invasion" which starts with an initial Soviet drop of airborne divisions behind NATO lines. In both cases the victory condition is the same: the player who controls the greatest number of towns wins.

== Reception ==
Reception

Review score
Publication	Score
Zzap!64	97%

Computer Gaming World's reviewer, an Armor Branch officer with the United States Army, stated "I haven't been disappointed". He stated that the terrain was generally accurate to what he saw while stationed in Germany for eight years, and approved of the game's two separate scenarios. Minor criticisms included the criteria for victory and the lack of mines or nuclear combat. Electronic Games wrote that the game "illustrates the terrible cost of" a conventional war in Germany "even more dramatically than any book or magazine article could". The magazine stated that Germany 1985 was "the most advanced computer war game yet" with "stunning hi-res maps", and concluded that it "does a remarkable job of simulating the way a conventional war would have to be fought ... any war gamer will feel his efforts have been richly rewarded".

== Legacy ==
The game had three sequels: RDF 1985, which simulated a battle between the American Rapid Deployment Force and Soviet forces for control of the Saudi Arabian oil fields; Baltic 1985: Corridor to Berlin, in which NATO forces were tasked with relieving Allied soldiers trapped in Berlin at the beginning of the war; and Norway 1985, which showed the battle between Soviet forces and NATO ski-troops for control of Norway.

In addition, the 1981 SSI game Southern Command, which was a simulation of the Israeli counterattack across the Suez Canal during the 1973 war with Egypt, used the same combat resolution system.

Preceded by None	When Superpowers Collide	Succeeded by RDF 1985
