= Europe Ablaze =

1985 air combat video game

- Cover art by Mitch Levitt
- Developer: Strategic Studies Group
- Publisher: Strategic Studies Group
- Designers: Roger Keating; Eric Baker; Ian Trout
- Platforms: Apple II, Commodore 64
- Release: 1985
- Genre: Wargame
- Modes: Single-player, multiplayer

Europe Ablaze, subtitled "The Air War over England and Germany 1939-1945", is a computer wargame developed and published by Strategic Studies Group (SSG) for the Commodore 64 and Apple II in 1985. It is based on air warfare of World War II.

== Gameplay ==
Europe Ablaze is a computer game for 2–12 players that covers the period 1939 to 1945 and contains three scenarios that depict strategic bombings in Europe during World War II.

The game is built on a modified Carriers at War engine. The units of maneuver are air groups with 5 to 40 planes. Players can control forces of either Axis or Allied powers. Each side has one Commander-in-chief slot and up to three air Fleet Commander slots that can be occupied either by human players or by artificial intelligence.

=== Scenarios ===
The game includes three scenarios:

- "Their Finest Hour": Covers the period 10 August 1940 to 4 September 1940, the critical period of the Battle of Britain.
- "Enemy Coast Ahead" Covers the period 23 July 1943 to 20 August 1943 and simulates Operation Gomorrah, the destruction of Hamburg.
- Piercing the Reich" Covers 3 February 1944 to 26 February 1945, simulating simulates the great air battles over Germany.

Each scenario is broken down into days, which in their turn consist of five-minute intervals.

The game also comes with a scenario design module, allowing players to custom design missions.

== Publication history ==
The Australian software publisher SSG was founded by Roger Keating and Eric Baker in 1983. After their first release, the science fiction game Reach for the Stars, Keating and Baker turned to wargames with Carriers at War. It proved popular, and they used the same engine for their third release, Europe Ablaze, designed by Keating and Baker, and published in 1985 with graphic design by Ian Trout and cover art by Mitch Levitt.

== Reception ==
In the Feb-Mar issue of II Computing, Rick Teverbaugh called this "one of the most complex war simulations on the market. It is exciting to play and easy to learn."

In Issue 21 of the Australian game magazine Breakout!, Nigel Brand called it "a fine simulation and is indicative of programming of the very highest order." However, Brand was disappointing by the rulebook. Brand also did not like how information was summarized for the players, and that it was not possible to transfer squadrons from one base to another. Brand concluded, "Despite the excellent sound effects, some people may find Europe Ablaze a little boring ... However a well-planned strike, incorporating appropriate defence-suppression tactics, is rewarding ... Europe Ablaze captures the essential spirit of that style of conflict and deserves considerable success."

Ken McMahon, writing in Commodore User, gave the game a rating of 8 out of 10 and described Europe Ablaze as "one of the most extensive and accurate World War II simulations".

In the February 1986 issue of the French game magazine Jeux et Stratégie, Michel Brassinne warned that this game "is not intended for beginners" due to its complexity. Brassine concluded "A game for specialists.""

In the Australian magazine Commodore Magazine, Chris Hindmarsh wrote, "As usual SSG have produced a top of the range product. This time their act seems totally to have come together with complete and understandable tutorials included." Hindmarsh concluded, "The WWII scenarios are exciting, compulsive and authentic — well represented with sight and sound and of interest to both the general games player as well as the ardent wargamer."

Writing for Compute!, Neil Randall noted, "For those expecting excellence, Europe Ablaze will not disappoint ... But those hoping for innovation may not be." Despite this, Randall concluded, "Europe Ablaze is a fine simulation that uses a proven game system. We can't ask for much more."

In Issue 10 of .info, Benn Dunnington gave the game 3.5 stars and wrote, "Europe Ablaze is about as close as you can get to military board-gaming without a board."

In Computer Gaming World, Jay Selover praised the game for its multi-player, gameplay variety, and the possibility to create custom scenarios.

Computer and Video Games noted that the game is not for beginners and gave it a score of 7 out of 10.

In the Swedish magazine Oberoende Computer, Morton S. Nielsen thought "Europe Ablaze offers the best experience of the air war to date. The simulation is challenging [and] more action-oriented." Nielsen concluded, "Europe Ablaze is undoubtedly one of the best purchases in the genre."
