= Southern Command =

Southern Command can refer to a number of military commands:

- Southern Command (IRA)
- Southern Command (Israel)
- Southern Command (India), Indian Army
- Southern Naval Command, Indian Navy command
- Andaman and Nicobar Command, Indian Armed Forces command for Southeast Asia
- Maritime Theatre Command, proposed Indian Armed Forces command which will amalgamate the above
- Southern Command (Pakistan)
- Southern Command (United Kingdom)
- United States Southern Command (USA)
- Southern Command (video game)
- Southern Command (Syrian rebel group)

== See also ==
- Southern Air Command (disambiguation)
