= Fire King (video game) =

1988 video game

- Developer: Micro Forté
- Publishers: Strategic Studies Group; Electronic Arts
- Platforms: Commodore 64, Commodore 128, MS-DOS
- Release: 1988
- Genres: Action; Role-playing video game
- Mode: Single-player

Fire King is an action role-playing video game. It was developed by Micro Forté, published by Strategic Studies Group and distributed by Electronic Arts in 1988 for the Commodore 64/128 and MS-DOS. It was a sequel to another game of the same style titled Demon Stalkers: The Raid on Doomfane. The game has been compared to Gauntlet, with its top-down view and endless enemies spawning from monster generators, but differs in that it contains more plot and puzzles than the typical hack and slash game.

== Plot ==
Fire King is a game where the player can choose to play as one of six characters, first appearing in a room located above the town square in Stormhaven Bay. Four mages control each of the elemental forces of Earth, Air, Fire, and Water to keep the land in harmony, and the Fire Mage was serving as their king, but was killed by a powerful magical beast. Although this monster was killed, another magical beast appeared and began to eat the villagers while other creatures terrorize the countryside, leaving it to the player characters to find and defeat the beast in the catacombs.

== Reception ==
The game was reviewed in 1990 in Dragon #158 by Hartley, Patricia, and Kirk Lesser in "The Role of Computers" column. The reviewers gave the game 4½ out of 5 stars. Douglas Seacat of Computer Gaming World noted, "The synthesis of action and RPG is an interesting, if not altogether successful one." Seacat praised the plot, but noted the pace of the action did not match the slow-paced inventory system, commenting, "The entire game just seems to have a rough edge, as if it weren't finished yet."
