= Kwari =

2008 video game

- Developer: Micro Forte
- Publisher: Kwari Limited
- Engine: BigWorld Technology
- Platform: Windows
- Release: EU: January 7, 2008
- Genre: First-person shooter
- Mode: Multiplayer

Kwari is a first-person shooter multiplayer online game developed by Micro Forté and released by Kwari Ltd. on January 7, 2008.

Kwari is free to download but requires players to spend real money to buy ammunition and other in-game items. Players can earn money by killing other players and holding a certain item (called "the pill") at the end of the game but lose money when being hit or killed.

Kwari received negative reviews on release, with GamesRadar+ giving it 2 stars out of 5, criticizing game's technical aspects and the business model by saying it sets most players up to lose money.
