= Pokémon Battle Frontier =

Pokémon Battle Frontier may refer to:

- Pokémon: Battle Frontier, the 2005 ninth season of the Pokémon animated series
- Pokémon Battle Frontier (manga), a manga

== See also ==
- Battlefront (disambiguation)
