= Baltic 1985: Corridor to Berlin =

1984 video game

Baltic 1985: Corridor To Berlin
- Developer: Roger Keating
- Publisher: Strategic Simulations
- Platforms: Apple II, Commodore 64
- Release: NA: 1984
- Genre: Computer wargame
- Modes: Single-player, multiplayer

Baltic 1985: Corridor To Berlin is a computer wargame published in 1984 by Strategic Simulations. Developed by Roger Keating, it is the third in the "When Superpowers Collide" series. It was released for the Apple II and Commodore 64.

== Gameplay ==
In 1985, after NATO halts a Soviet invasion of West Germany, and a communist invasion of Saudi Arabia is thwarted by the American Rapid Deployment Forces, the Soviets rush forces from the West German front into Poland to put down an anti-Soviet uprising. NATO takes advantage of the moment by invading East Germany to relieve the siege of West Berlin and evacuate its personnel trapped behind enemy lines.

The player may choose to play either the NATO or Soviet forces, and can play in turns against another human component or against the computer.

== See also ==
- Germany 1985
- RDF 1985
- Norway 1985

Preceded by RDF 1985	When Superpowers Collide	Succeeded by Norway 1985
