= RDF 1985 =

1983 video game

- Developer(s): Roger Keating
- Publisher(s): Strategic Simulations
- Platform(s): Apple II, Commodore 64
- Release: NA: 1983
- Genre(s): Wargame
- Mode(s): Single-player, multiplayer

RDF 1985 is a computer wargame published in 1983 by Strategic Simulations. Developed by Roger Keating, it was the second in the "When Superpowers Collide" series.

== Summary ==
The game simulates a battle between the American Rapid Deployment Force and Soviet forces for control of the Saudi Arabian oil fields. The player may choose to play either the American or Soviet forces, and can play in turns against another human component or against the computer.

== See also ==
- Germany 1985
- Baltic 1985: Corridor to Berlin
- Norway 1985

Preceded by Germany 1985	When Superpowers Collide	Succeeded by Baltic 1985: Corridor to Berlin
