= Panzer Battles (video game) =

1989 video game

- Developer: Strategic Studies Group
- Publisher: Strategic Studies Group
- Platforms: Amiga, Apple II, Apple IIGS, Commodore 64, MS-DOS, Mac
- Release: 1989
- Genre: Strategy

Panzer Battles is a computer wargame published by Strategic Studies Group in 1989.

== Gameplay ==
Panzer Battles is a game in which six scenarios are included: Minsk, Moscow, Kharkov, Prokhorokva, Kanev, and Korsun. The game re-enacts panzer tank battles, playing the scenarios out on a color map with the tanks represented as flashing squares. These scenarios are modeled on the Eastern Front of World War II, with the player commanding the armies of either the Germans or Russians. As part of the Battlefront series, it uses the game engine from previous games in the series.

The games uses menus for managing troops and objectives. Players may play against the computer or each other. The steppes weather affects the armies of both sides. The game comes with the programs WarPaint and WarPlan which allow players to create scenarios or customize existing ones.

== Reception ==
Reception

Review scores
Publication	Score
Amiga Format	69%
Amiga Power	62%
Joystick	88%
The Games Machine (UK)	77%

Brian Walker reviewed Panzer Battles and Rommel: Battles for North Africa for Games International magazine, and gave them both a rating of 8 out of 10, and stated that "Despite their hard core titles, there is no reason why either of these games should be restricted to the wargames market. In essence, they are resource management games that should appeal to both military freaks as well as the rest of the gaming fraternity."

Paul Rigby for The Games Machine cautioned that although the Battlefront system used in the game may not have been state of the art despite regular upgrades, "there is still plenty to keep you occupied".

Dan Weaver for Compute! argued that for anyone looking to become an armchair general with this game, "The best part is that you don't have to worry about the Russian mud and snow slowing down your microprocessor as you advance on the enemy."

Pat McDonald for Amiga Format warned although the game has "lots of rough edges", that "it feels original, has pace and gives a feel of real military command" and recommended it to anyone who likes the World War II period.

Jonathan Davies for Amiga Power compared this game to Halls of Montezuma and felt "sure that Panzer Battles matches up to it in every way" while noting that in this game the "graphics are prettier".
