= Carriers at War =

1984 video game

- Developer: Strategic Studies Group
- Publisher: Strategic Studies Group
- Designers: Roger Keating; Ian Trout
- Platforms: Apple II, Commodore 64
- Release: 1984
- Genre: Computer wargame
- Mode: Single-player

Carriers at War 1941-1945: Fleet Carrier Operations in the Pacific is a 1984 computer wargame by Strategic Studies Group for Apple II and Commodore 64. The game was designed by Roger Keating and Ian Trout. There have been two remakes.

== Reception ==
Reception

Review scores
Publication	Score
Computer Gaming World	8-bit: 3/5
inCider	AP2: 2/4

II Computing in 1985 called the Apple II version of Carriers at War "the best-playing simulation of naval warfare I have seen on either tabletop or video monitor" and favorably citing its historical accuracy. inCider was less positive, rating the Apple II version two stars in 1986. The reviewer stated that the game "is so difficult to master, it takes much of the joy out of playing it ... Carriers' big drawback is its complexity", adding that he preferred Gary Grigsby's SSI naval games as "they're less flexible, but they're just as detailed and much more playable". Computer Gaming World stated that "Carriers at War is the best game available on World War II carrier operations. It is, perhaps, the best wargame of 1984 on any topic".

Carriers at War was awarded the Charles S. Roberts Award for "Best Adventure Game for Home Computer of 1984".

A 1987 overview of World War II simulations in the Computer Gaming World rated the game four of five points and stated that "it excels in flexibility, options and limited intelligence". A 1993 survey in the magazine of wargames gave it three stars out of five, stating "Highly recommended for the 8-bit market". In 1994 the magazine said that the 8-bit version was "one of the first computer wargames to approach the complexity of board wargame simulations while still remaining playable and fun".

== Legacy ==
A remake, Carriers at War, was released for MS-DOS in 1992. A sequel to the remake, Carriers at War II, was released for MS-DOS and Classic Mac OS in 1993. A second remake was published by Matrix Games in 2007 for Windows.

== See also ==
- Carrier Force
