= Dickson, Australian Capital Territory =

Suburb of Canberra, Australia

Dickson
- Suburb
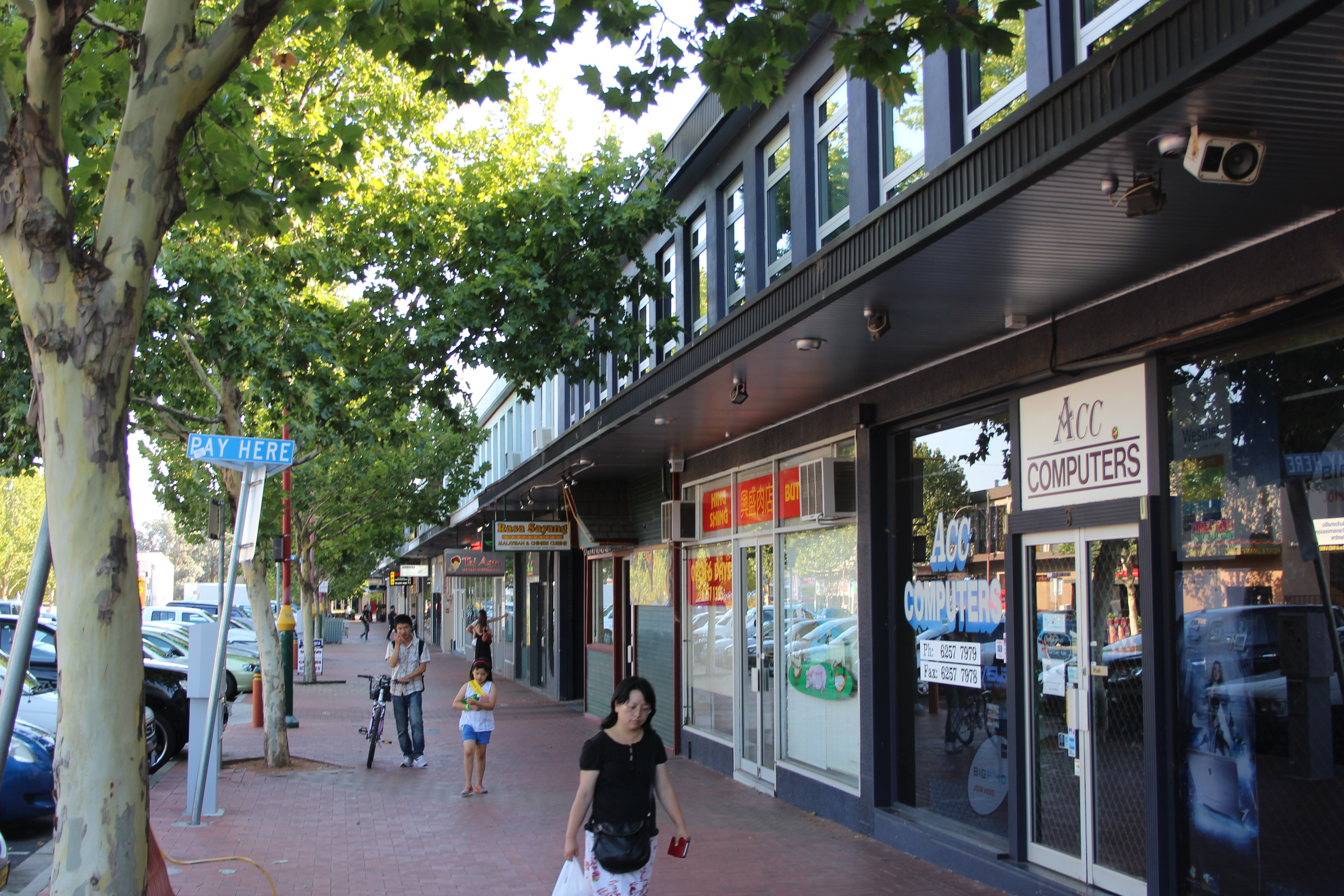
- Woolley Street, Dickson 2013

- Coordinates: 35°15′09″S 149°08′23″E
- Country: Australia
- State: Australian Capital Territory
- City: Canberra
- District: North Canberra
- Location: 4 km (2.5 mi) N of Canberra CBD; 18 km (11 mi) NW of Queanbeyan; 86 km (53 mi) SW of Goulburn; 283 km (176 mi) SW of Sydney
- Established: 1928

Government
  - Territory electorate: Kurrajong
  - Federal division: Canberra

Area
  - Total: 1.6 km^{2} (0.62 sq mi)
- Elevation: 580 m (1,900 ft)

Population
  - Total: 3,292 (2021 census)
  - Density: 2,060/km^{2} (5,330/sq mi)
- Postcode: 2602
Suburbs around Dickson
Lyneham	Downer	Watson
Lyneham	Dickson	Hackett
Lyneham	Braddon	Ainslie

Dickson is a suburb in the Inner North of Canberra, Australia. It is named after Sir James R. Dickson (1832–1901) who was a Queensland advocate of Australian Federation and one of the founders of the Australian Constitution. There is no specific theme for street names.

== History ==
Between March 1924 and November 1926, the original Canberra Aerodrome occupied the southern third of Edward Shumack's soldier settlement block (which continued to be used for sheep grazing) in what was then known as the District of Ainslie (Block 98i). The official aerodrome extended from a NW corner north of Dickson Library near Antill St in Downer to a SE corner near Dutton St and Majura Avenue, taking in the whole western portion of Majura playing fields and the entire central residential portion of Dickson between Cowper St and Dickson wetlands. The actual landing ground covered the whole of Section 72 Dickson and was marked by placements of whitewashed rocks at four corners, a windsock, and a large central whitewashed concrete ring (60 feet in diameter) visible to pilots from a distance. This was Canberra's original airport, and was used by RAAF and civilian flights.

Canberra's first air crash took place here, at about 10.30am on 11 February 1926, when a RAAF De Havilland DH9 traveling from Richmond air base to survey the Murrumbidgee River stalled after making a sharp turn to land and crashed in the NW corner, within 100m of where the library now stands, bursting into flames. The 26 year old pilot, Philip Mackenzie Pitt, was killed on impact and is buried in what was until 2022 an unmarked grave at Queanbeyan's Riverside cemetery, in the Catholic section. Pitt had trained as a cadet at Duntroon, and done his flight training at Point Cook near Melbourne in 1925. The 25 year old aerial photographer/observer in the back seat, William Edward Callander, was pulled from the wreckage by a farm worker, Walter Ernest Johnson, who had been ploughing the adjoining paddock and leapt the fence to offer aid to the victims. Callander died at Acton Hospital later that evening and is buried at St John's Church in Reid, leaving a widow and two small children. The aerodrome was surveyed six months later by the Federal Capital Commission (FCC), but unwillingness by the FCC to grant a long-term lease to the Department of Defence stymied investment in a hangar and other facilities, and urgency to prepare for the opening of provisional Parliament House in 1927 resulted in the aerodrome being transferred to the Duntroon property in Majura Valley (at the western edge of the current airport site).

Dickson was gazetted on 28 September 1928 and took in the whole of what are now the suburbs of Dickson and Downer. All of the land in Dickson had been earmarked for an Industrial area on the final 1918 Griffin Plan and blueprint. However the decision to transfer the Industrial area to Fyshwick was taken by 1945, and a 25-year lease was granted in 1940 to Dr Bertram Thomas Dickson, Chief of the Plant Industry Division of the CSIR, for Dickson Experiment Station. The station covered 640 acres, comprising the eastern third and northern edge of Dickson, the whole of Downer (which at that time was still part of Dickson), and a small part of what is now Watson at the station's northern end. Dickson Experiment Station began operating during World War II and initially focused on trialling crops to aid the war effort including opium, rubber and pyrethrum, with assistance from the Women's Land Army. After the war ended, Dickson Experiment Station focused on soils and pasture research, food crops and sheep farming until as late as 1962. By May 1951 the Department of the Interior had determined that the land was required for suburban expansion and begun sketching plans for new road layouts, schools and a district shopping centre. Antill Street and the stormwater drain were built in 1958–59, and the first incursion into the Experiment Station was for a motel on the corner of Northbourne Avenue south of Antill Street (where the Telstra building is now). The Experiment Station's work was transferred to Ginninderra Experiment Station in Belconnen. The first houses in the suburb were built near Braddon in 1958.

== Geography ==
The suburb is bounded by Northbourne Avenue, Antill Street, Phillip Avenue, Majura Avenue, and Wakefield Avenue. Dickson contains no hills or significant slopes. A tributary of Sullivans Creek passes through the middle of Dickson, draining storm water from east to west.

== Amenities ==
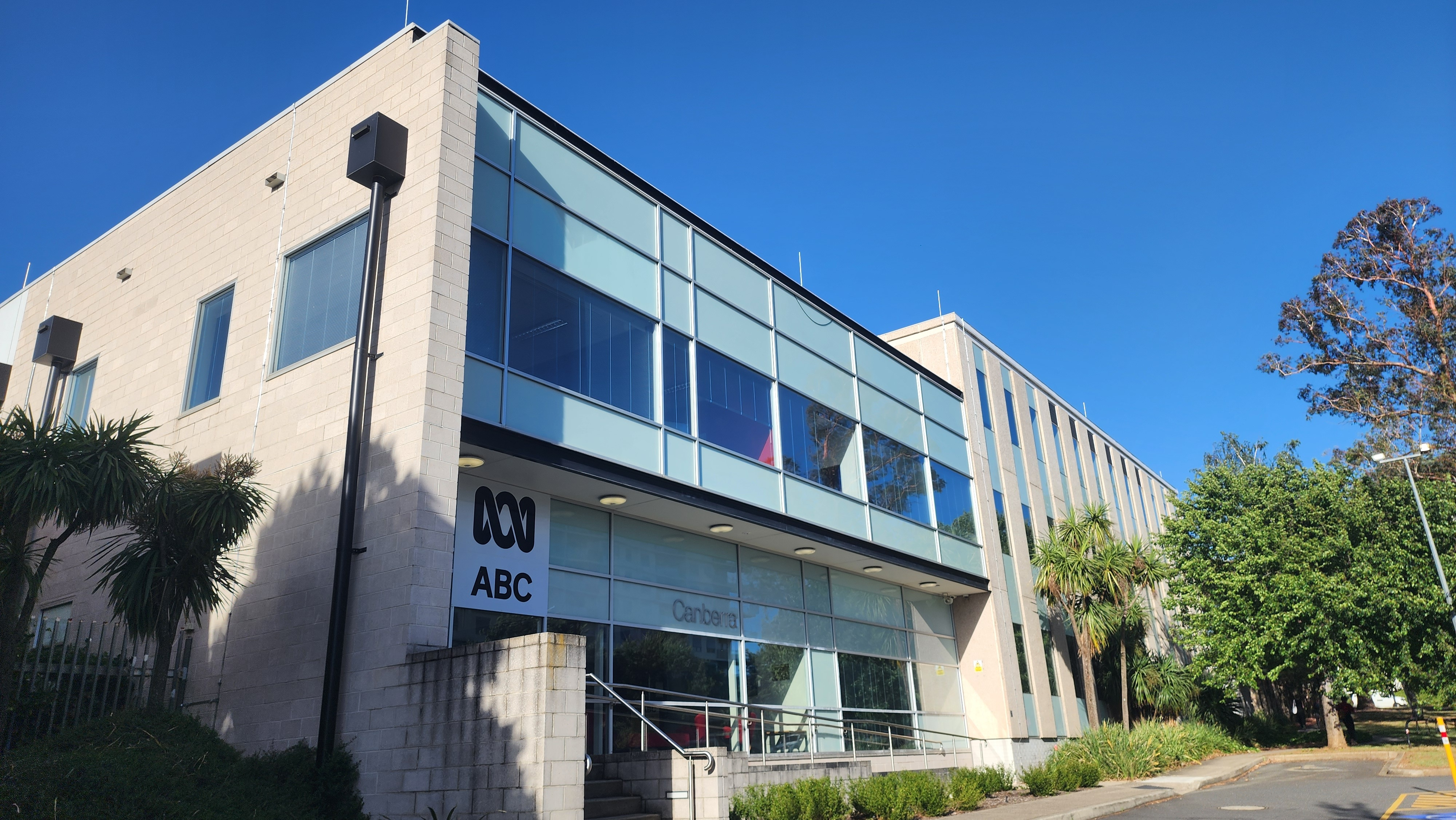
ABC Canberra studios

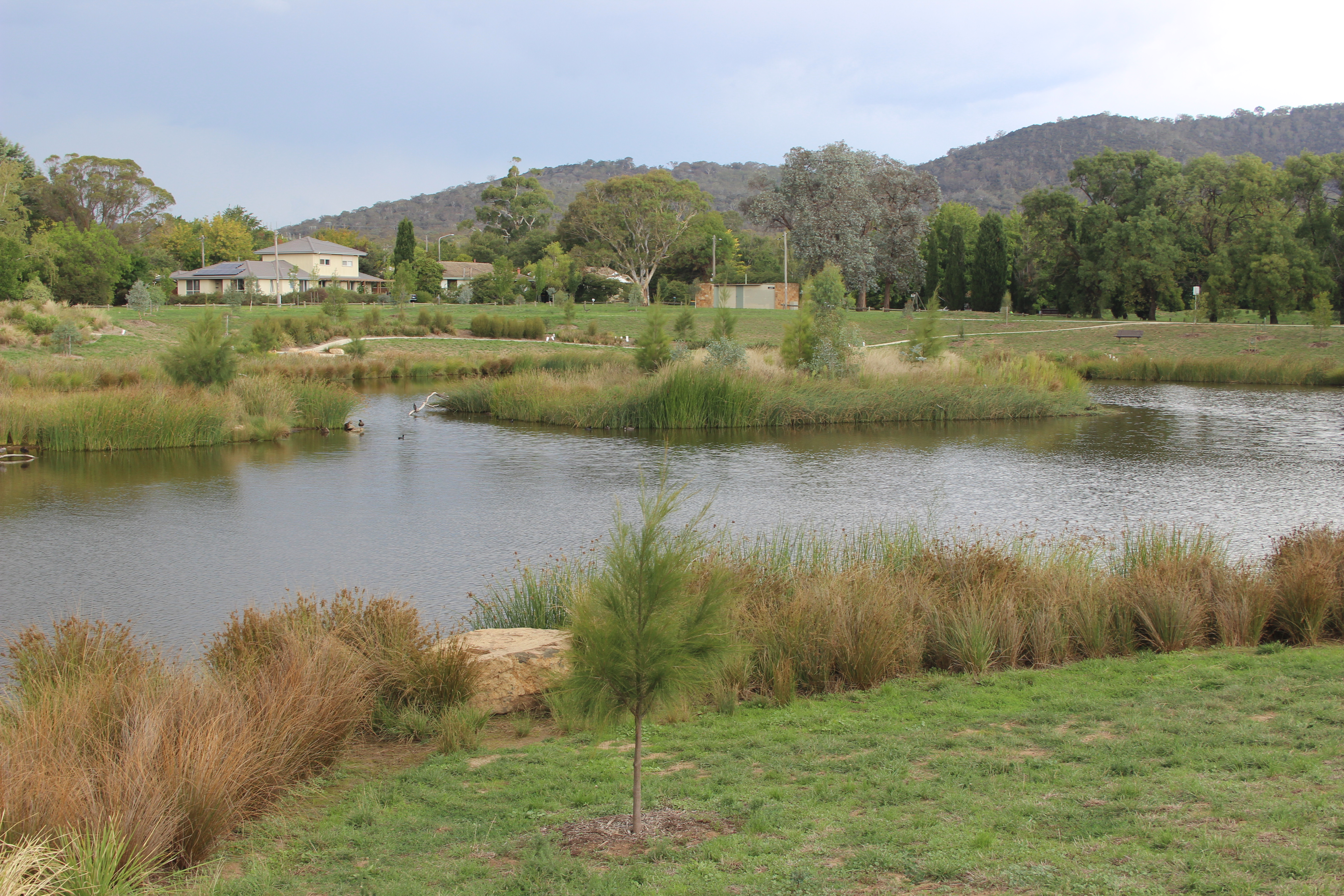
Dickson wetlands

The suburb contains the Dickson Centre, a significant commercial centre in Canberra's Inner North containing the Woolworths supermarket which reportedly once had the highest turnover in Australia, plus a Coles supermarket in the adjacent Dickson Village complex. The centre contains an ambulance station, office buildings, a library known for its distinct design, many shops and the Dickson Baptist Church.

Outside the Dickson Centre, the suburb contains the Australian Broadcasting Corporation Canberra radio and television studios. Two colleges are located in the suburb, Dickson College, a public senior secondary school, and Daramalan College, a Catholic high school. The Daramalan Junior school was once located in Dickson, where Emmaus Christian School is located now, and operated between 1986 and 1997. It was a school for boys in years 5 and 6, near St. Brigid's Church.

Dickson has large playing fields with several ovals, which are used to play many sports including soccer, cricket and rugby, as well as the venue for schools carnivals, and are a popular place on weekends. Organisations calling the playing fields home including the Majura Junior Soccer Club and Corroboree Little Athletics. Near the playing fields is a walking track between rows of pine, oak and gum trees which leads to the Dickson shopping centre. Hawdon Street is where the Canberra Space Dome and Observatory used to be located before being destroyed by fire in 2010. On the south side of Sullivans Creek at this point is the Dickson Wetlands, completed in December 2011.

== Character ==
The central part of the suburb is characterised by leafy streets, detached single dwelling houses, and two-storey duplexes. The western part of the suburb is being intensively redeveloped for multi-storey apartments. Redevelopment for eight to ten-storey mixed use is permitted on properties fronting Northbourne Avenue.

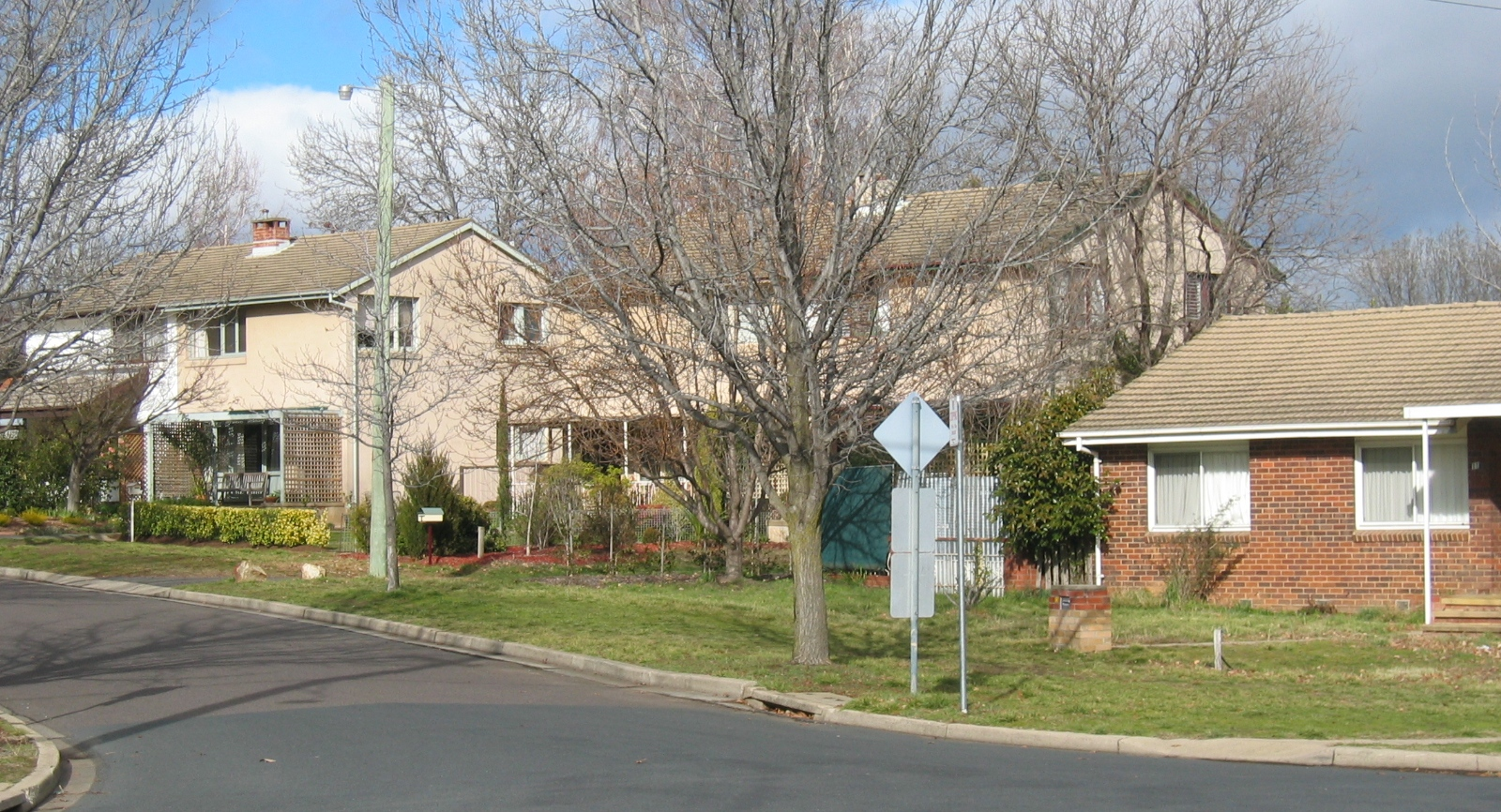
A residential street in Dickson

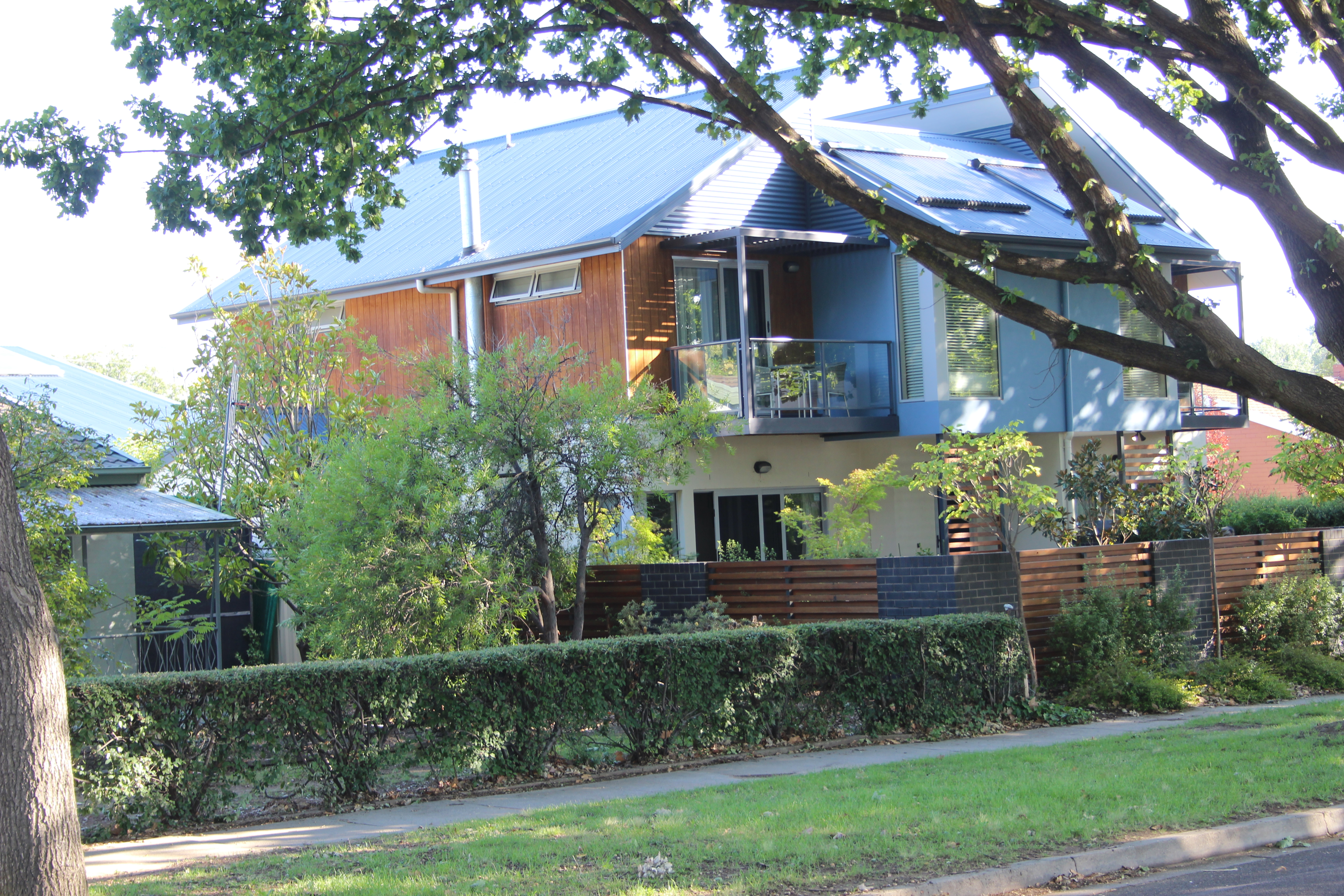
Town houses in Dooring St

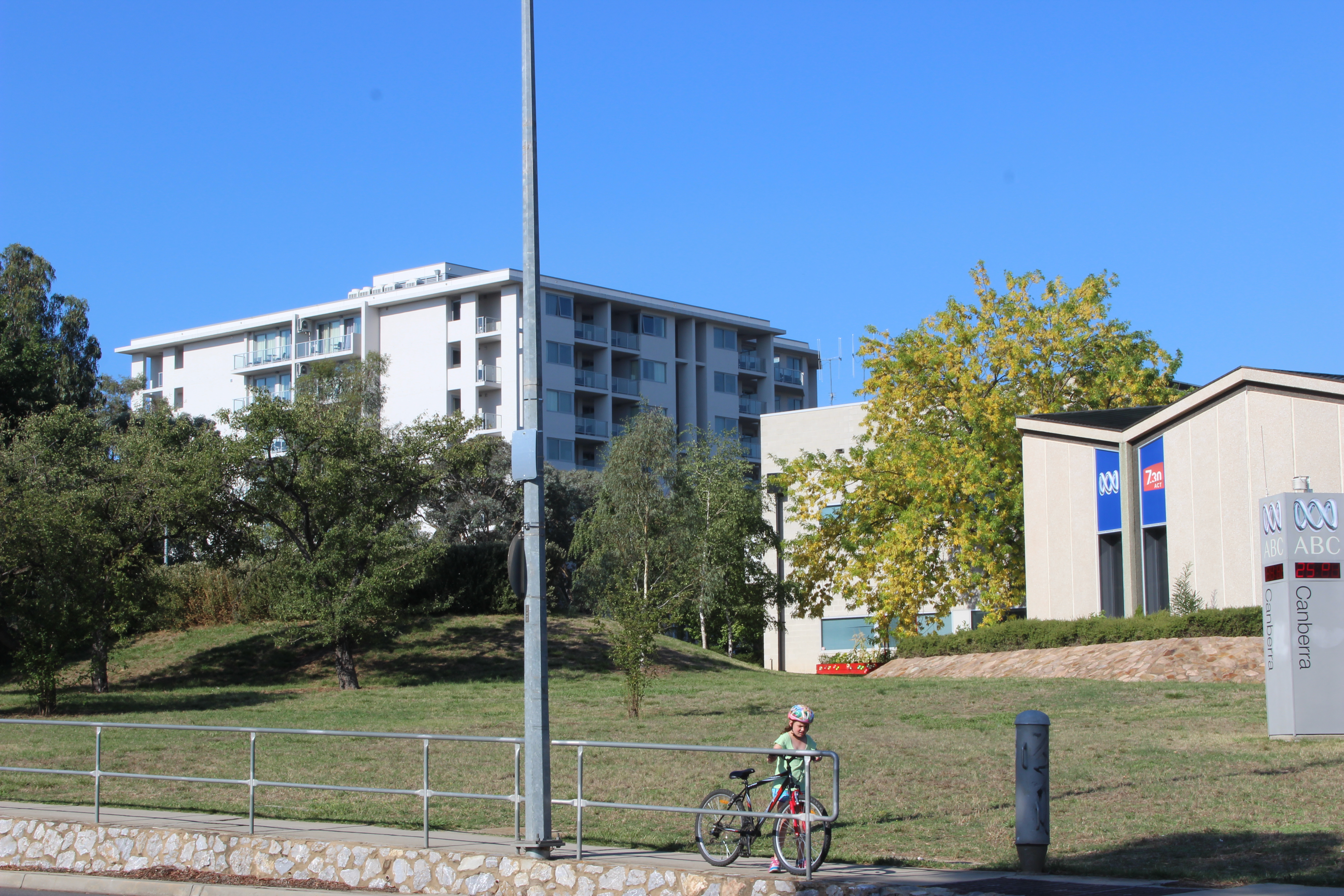
Adina serviced apartments near Wakefield Avenue and ABC, on Dooring St

== Demographics ==
At the 2021 census, the population of Dickson was 3,292, including 49 (1.5%) Indigenous persons and 2,189 (66.5%) Australian-born persons. 29.6% of dwellings were separate houses (compared to the Australian average of 72.3%), while 21.5% were semi-detached, row or terrace houses (Australian average: 12.6%) and 49.2% were flats, units or apartments (Australian average: 14.2%). 40.6% of the population were professionals, compared to the Australian average of 24.0%. Notably 22.5% worked in central government administration, compared to the Australian average of 1.1%, although the ACT-wide average is a similar 17.1%. Dickson is favoured by students and young adults with 32.4% of its population in the 20 to 34-year-old age group (compared to the Australian average of 20.5%). The suburb has few children under 15: 12.9%, compared to 18.2% Australia-wide. 33.2% of the dwellings are occupied by single person households, compared to the Australian average of 25.6%. 60.1% of the population had no religion, while 12.5% were Catholic, 4.8% not stated, 4.6% Buddhist and 3.8% Anglican .

== Governance ==
2025 federal election
Labor	40.00%
Greens	30.36%
Liberal	14.46%
Independent	12.05%
2024 ACT election
Labor	39.9%
Greens	24.2%
Liberal	14.2%
Independents for Canberra	12.9%

Dickson is located within the federal electorate of Canberra and it is represented by Alicia Payne for the Labor Party. In the ACT Legislative Assembly, Dickson is part of the electorate of Kurrajong, which elects five members on the basis of proportional representation, currently two Labor, one Green, one Liberal and one Independent. Polling place statistics are shown to the right for the Dickson polling place at Majura Community Centre in the 2025 federal and 2024 ACT elections.

== Geology ==
Calcareous shales from the Canberra Formation dates from the Silurian period. This rock is the limestone of the original title of Canberra "Limestone Plains". Quaternary alluvium lies on top of the shale in the flatter parts of Dickson.

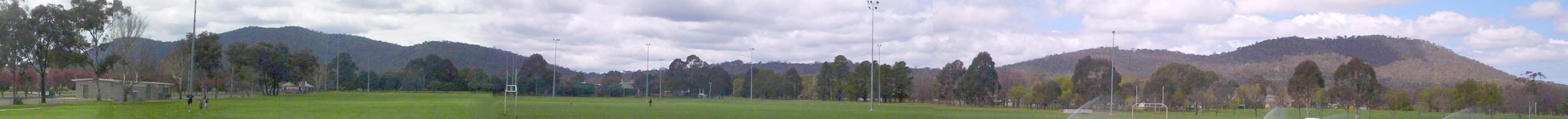
Dickson Oval with Mount Majura and Mount Ainslie in the background

== Transport ==
Dickson has 2 light rail stops and a bus interchange called "Dickson Interchange" with 6 lines. Dickson Interchange's bus lines are the following: 18, 30, 31, 50, 51, 53 and R9. The two light rail stops are Macathur Avenue, located near the ABC studios in the middle of Northbourne Avenue, and Dickson Interchange also in the middle of Northbourne, across the road from Dickson Interchange.

== Footnotes ==
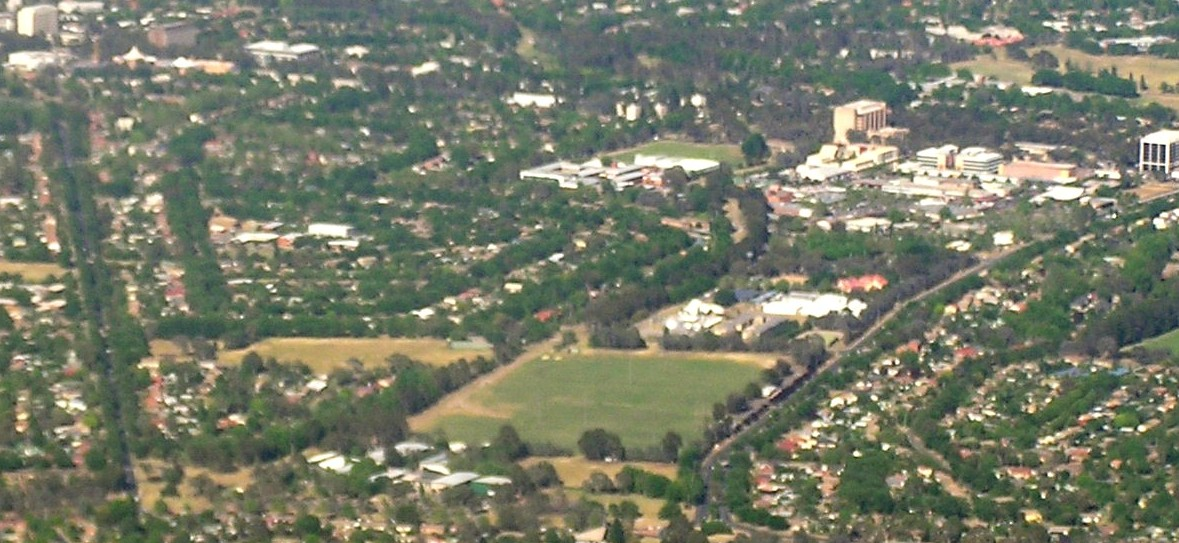
Aerial view from the north-east, the shopping centre is on the top right, with Dickson College at the bottom
