= Battlefront (2007 video game) =

- Developer: Strategic Studies Group
- Publisher: Matrix Games
- Designers: Ian Trout, Roger Keating
- Platform: Microsoft Windows
- Release: 7 February 2007
- Genres: Wargame, turn-based strategy
- Modes: Single-player, multiplayer

Battlefront is a wargame developed by Strategic Studies Group and published by Matrix Games for Microsoft Windows in 2007. The game is a turn-based strategy set in World War II. It is the namesake of an earlier game released by Strategic Studies Group in 1986.

== Gameplay ==
Battlefront is a battalion-level simulation wargame and contains four scenarios that depict battles of World War II. The scenarios are based on Battle of Gazala, Operation Market Garden, Battle of Saipan, and Novorossiysk Defensive Operation. The player can control forces of either Axis or Allied powers. Parameters like fog of war, weather, supply and reinforcements can be changed for every scenario.

== Reception ==
Larry Levandowski of Armchair General praised Battlefront for its scenarios, AI and interface. He stated that "the real point to the game is good old-fashioned war game goodness, and this is where the game stands out". The Wargamer gave Battlefront an Award for Excellence, describing it as "immersive and reasonably challenging".
