= Hackett, Australian Capital Territory =

Suburb of Canberra, Australia

Hackett
- Suburb
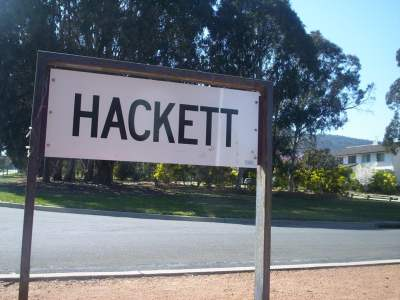
- Hackett sign

- Coordinates: 35°14′53″S 149°09′46″E
- Country: Australia
- State: Australian Capital Territory
- City: Canberra
- District: North Canberra
- Location: 6 km (3.7 mi) NE of Canberra CBD; 20 km (12 mi) NW of Queanbeyan; 84 km (52 mi) SW of Goulburn; 281 km (175 mi) SW of Sydney
- Established: 1960

Government
  - Territory electorate: Kurrajong
  - Federal division: Canberra

Area
  - Total: 1.9 km^{2} (0.73 sq mi)
- Elevation: 609 m (1,998 ft)

Population
  - Total: 3,227 (SAL 2021)
- Postcode: 2602
Suburbs around Hackett
Watson	Watson	Canberra Nature Park
Dickson	Hackett	Canberra Nature Park
Ainslie	Canberra Nature Park	Canberra Nature Park

Hackett (/hækɪt/) is an inner north suburb of Canberra, the capital city of Australia. Located approximately 4.5 km (2.8 mi) north-east of the central business district, Hackett is adjacent to Watson, Dickson and Ainslie. It is bounded by Antill Street and Philip Avenue, and the Mount Majura Nature Reserve to the east. Hackett has a neighbourhood oval, and shopping centre.

The suburb was named after Sir John Winthrop Hackett (1848–1916), who was a newspaper editor and worker for the Federation of Australia. Streets in Hackett are named after scientists.

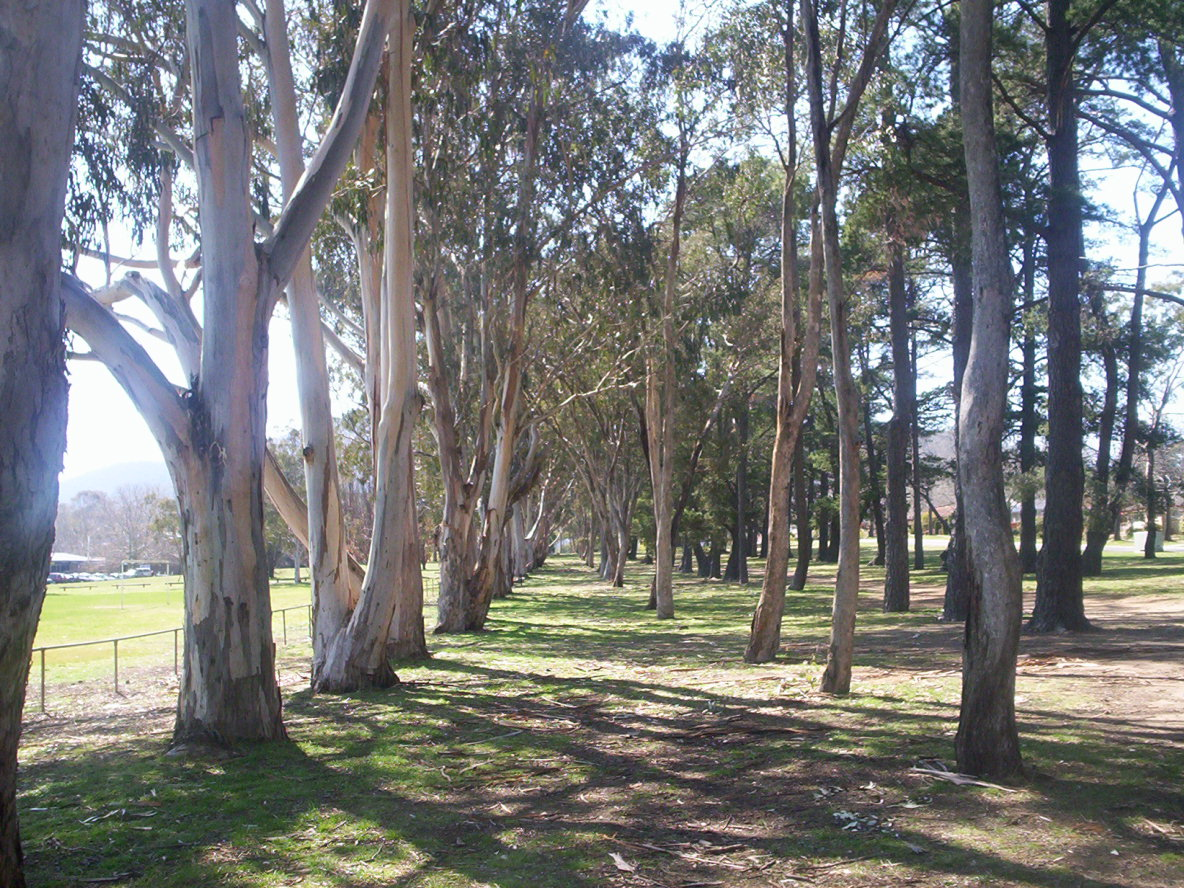
Hackett oval

== Geology ==
Calcareous shales from the Canberra Formation is overlain by Quaternary alluvium. This rock is the limestone of the original title of Canberra "Limestone Plains". The higher eastern side of Hackett is on top of the lowest layer of the Ainslie Volcanics, a grey Dacite and other erupted particles such as agglomerate and tuff.

== Demography ==
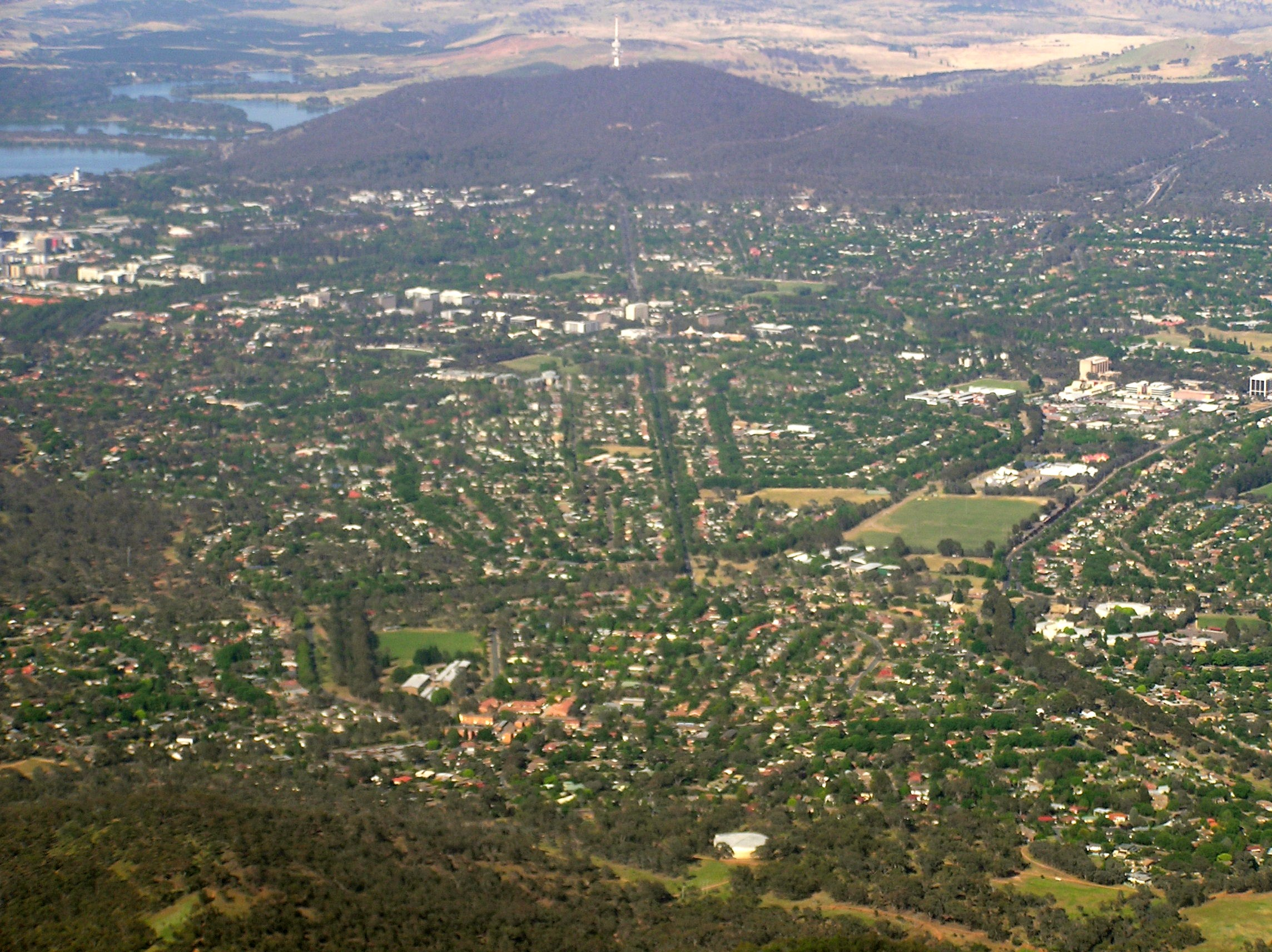
Aerial view of Hackett from north east

There were 2,991 usual residents of Hackett enumerated in the 2016 Census.

Hackett is socially and economically advantaged. In 2016, its population was highly educated, with 53% of adults having completed a university degree, compared to just 22% in Australia as a whole. Its unemployment rate was estimated to be just 2.6% in December 2019, just over half the national average of 5.1%. This relative economic prosperity is reflected in median personal incomes which, in the 2016 Census, were reported to be 1.6 times the national average. Overall, the Australian Bureau of Statistics estimate that Hackett is among the top 5% most advantaged suburbs in Australia according to its index of socio-economic advantage and disadvantage.

Hackett is less culturally and linguistically diverse than the rest of the Australian Capital Territory and Australia as a whole. It has an unusually large proportion of the population born in Australia and relatively few residents born in China and India, and a relatively large number of households where English is the only language spoken. In terms of religious diversity, Hackett is unusual in that a majority of residents (53%) report having no religious affiliation, compared with 30% nationally.

== Governance ==
2019 federal election: House of Representatives
Labor	37.07%
Greens	37.87%
Liberal	16.59%
Independent	4.35%

Hackett is located within the federal division of Canberra, which is currently represented by Alicia Payne in the House of Representatives. The suburb is the home of Andrew Leigh, the Member of Parliament representing the neighbouring electoral division of Fenner.

House of Representatives primary vote statistics are shown to the right for the Dickson East polling place (at Dickson College) in the 2019 federal election. The Dickson East booth, located on the boundary between Hackett and Dickson, returned the strongest vote for the Greens in the House of Representatives of any polling place in the Australian Capital Territory in the 2019 federal election.

In the ACT Legislative Assembly, Hackett falls within the electorate of Kurrajong. Kurrajong is represented by five Members of the Legislative Assembly (MLAs), who are elected using the proportional Hare–Clark electoral system. Currently, it is represented by two Labor, one Greens, one Liberal and one Independent MLA. Two of these five MLAs are cabinet ministers. The suburb is represented in local matters by the Hackett Community Association, an affiliated member of the North Canberra Community Council.

== Particular street names ==
- Grayson Street is named after scientist Henry Joseph Grayson
- Mackenzie Street is named after anatomist William Colin Mackenzie
- Madigan Street is named after geologist Cecil Thomas Madigan.
- Maitland Street is named after geologist Andrew Gibb Maitland
- Richards Street is named after geologist Henry Caselli Richards
- Rivett Street is named after chemist Albert Cherbury David Rivett.
- Selwyn Street is named after English Australian geologist Alfred R. C. Selwyn
- Skeats Street is named after English Australian geologist Ernest Willington Skeats.

== See also ==
- Canberra District wine region
