= Norway 1985 =

1985 video game

- Developer: Roger Keating
- Publisher: Strategic Simulations
- Platforms: Apple II, Commodore 64
- Release: NA: October 1985
- Genre: Wargame
- Modes: Single-player, two-players

Norway 1985 is a computer wargame published in October 1985 by Strategic Simulations. Developed by Roger Keating, it was the fourth in the "When Superpowers Collide" series.

== Summary ==
The game simulates NATO forces in Norway during the summer of 1985. The player may choose to play either the NATO or Soviet forces, and can play in turns against another human component or against the computer.

== Reception ==
Computer Gaming World in 1986 stated that Norway 1985's simplified rules compared to its predecessors accurately reflected the changes of arctic combat, and made it the most suitable for those new to the series. The magazine concluded that although those familiar with the older games "will have to adjust your expectations ... If you can do this, you will find a good game here".

== See also ==
- Germany 1985
- RDF 1985
- Baltic 1985: Corridor to Berlin

Preceded by Baltic 1985: Corridor to Berlin	When Superpowers Collide	Succeeded by None
