= Rommel: Battles for North Africa =

1988 video game

- Developer: Strategic Studies Group
- Publisher: Strategic Studies Group
- Platforms: Apple II, Commodore 64, MS-DOS, Mac, PC-98
- Release: 1988
- Genre: Wargame
- Modes: Single player, multiplayer

Rommel: Battles for North Africa is a computer wargame published in 1988 by Strategic Studies Group.

== Gameplay ==
Rommel: Battles for North Africa is a game in which eight scenarios simulate operational level battles.

== Reception ==
Jay Selover reviewed the game for Computer Gaming World, and stated that "That is the essence of Rommel: good scenarios, good development, good system."

Brian Walker reviewed Panzer Battles and Rommel: Battles for North Africa for Games International magazine, and gave them both a rating of 8 out of 10, and stated that "Despite their hard core titles, there is no reason why either of these games should be restricted to the wargames market. In essence, they are resource management games that should appeal to both military freaks as well as the rest of the gaming fraternity."
