= Computer Conflict =

1980 video game

- Developer(s): Strategic Simulations
- Publisher(s): Strategic Simulations
- Platform(s): Apple II
- Release: 1980
- Genre(s): Wargame
- Mode(s): Single, multiplayer

Computer Conflict is a 1980 compilation of two turn-based computer wargame scenarios by Strategic Simulations for the Apple II. The scenarios are imaginary and deal with the defense of Russia during the Cold War.

== Gameplay ==
The game includes two scenarios – Rebel Force designed by Roger Keating and Red Attack designed by Jim Yarborough.

- Rebel Force: A single-player "company level simulation of a battle between a modern combined arms force and a well equipped rebel force". It was originally published as Conflict (1979) in Australia by Keating.
- Red Attack!: "A two-player company level game which simulates an attack by a mixed Soviet tank and infantry force against a defending infantry force" where a player wins "by occupying two of the three towns on the mapboard". The battlefield is randomized – both players must agree on a fair one before the scenario begins.
