= Carriers at War (1992 video game) =

- Developer: Strategic Studies Group
- Publisher: Strategic Studies Group
- Designers: Roger Keating; Ian Trout
- Platforms: MS-DOS, Macintosh
- Release: 1992
- Genre: Wargame
- Mode: Single-player

Carriers at War 1941-1945: Fleet Carrier Operations in the Pacific is a 1992 wargame by Strategic Studies Group for MS-DOS and Macintosh. It is a remake of the 1984 Carriers at War. An expansion pack, Carriers at War: Construction Kit, was released in 1993. A sequel, Carriers at War II, was also released in 1993.

== Gameplay ==
Carriers at War is a strategic wargame which features historic, fictional, and randomly generated scenarios including naval and air battles from the Pacific in World War II. The player controls the forces of either the U.S. (Allied) or Japanese (Axis).

== Reception ==
Reception

Review scores
Publication	Score
Computer Gaming World	3.5/5
Dragon	4/5

In 1992 Computer Gaming World reviewed the new version of Carriers at War, which it described as having "only a superficial resemblance to its 8-bit predecessor" with a mouse-driven interface. The magazine praised the realism of combat including the fog of war, and liked the intelligence of the computer opponent while stating that a human was still better. It concluded that "CAW is the most accurate simulation of carrier warfare available and is by far the best for solitaire play. Players interested in the Pacific Theater of World War II should not miss it". A 1993 survey by Computer Gaming World of wargames rated the revised version three-plus stars, criticizing the lack of a campaign. In 1994 the magazine said that the MS-DOS version "was a milestone in computer wargame history". The game was reviewed in 1993 in Dragon #193 by Hartley, Patricia, and Kirk Lesser in "The Role of Computers" column. The reviewers gave the game 4 out of 5 stars.

In 1996, Computer Gaming World declared Carriers at War the 90th-best computer game ever released. The magazine's wargame columnist Terry Coleman named it his pick for the sixth-best computer wargame released by late 1996.

== See also ==
- Carrier Strike
