= Enemy Infestation =

1998 video game

- Developer: Micro Forté
- Publisher: Ripcord Games
- Platform: Microsoft Windows
- Release: NA: October 30, 1998
- Genre: Strategy
- Modes: Single-player, multiplayer

Enemy Infestation is a strategy video game developed by Micro Forté and published by Ripcord Games for Microsoft Windows in 1998.

== Reception ==
Reception

Aggregate score
| Aggregator | Score |
|---|---|
| GameRankings | 67% |

Review scores
| Publication | Score |
|---|---|
| AllGame | 3/5 |
| CNET Gamecenter | 7/10 |
| Computer Games Strategy Plus | 2.5/5 |
| Computer Gaming World | 3/5 |
| GamePro | 4/5 |
| GameSpot | 7.1/10 |
| GameStar | 79% |
| PC Accelerator | 7/10 |
| PC Gamer (US) | 52% |
| PC Zone | 70% |

The game received average reviews according to the review aggregation website GameRankings.
