= Hawker College =

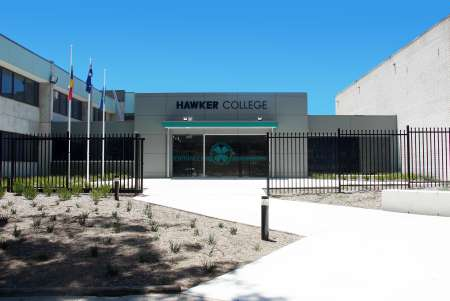
- Hawker College front entrance

Location
- Murranji Street, Hawker; Canberra, Australian Capital Territory, 2614; Australia; 35.2455°S 149.0315°E

Information
- School type: College
- Motto: A Community of Learning
- Established: 1976; 50 years ago
- Principal: Lyndall Henman
- Grades: 11 and 12
- Enrolment: Non-selective
- Campus: Urban
- Colours: Navy blue, teal
- Website: http://www.hawkerc.act.edu.au/

Hawker College is a senior secondary college in Hawker, Australian Capital Territory, a suburb of Canberra. It caters to students completing their final two years of secondary education, and offers a wide range of curriculum choices.

Established in 1976, Hawker has a non-selective enrolment policy and caters for students from year 11 through to year 12.

== History ==
Hawker College is located on the site of the original Kama Homestead.

Construction of Hawker College, which was undertaken at a cost of $3.3 million by Jennings Industries Ltd, began in January 1973 and was completed in December 1975. The college was formed shortly after the ACT Government developed its own education system—the new system meant that public high schools would only teach from grade 7 to 10, and that grades 11 and 12 would be completed at a separate college. Hawker was established and enrolled its first students in 1976 and the school's first Year 12 Certificates were presented in December 1977.

== Campus ==
The college campus is located in the suburb of Hawker, Canberra. The campus is in close proximity to public ovals and local shops Faculties of the college include: library, visual and performing arts studio, professional theatre, media facilities, information technology facilities, gymnasium, fully equipped training restaurant and kitchen, training coffee shop, sports oval, tennis courts, modern laboratories and science facilities, design drawing facilities, fully equipped wood area for furniture and construction and cafeteria.

== Principals ==
- John M Edmunds: 1976–1983
- Bill F Donovan: 1984–1991
- Sandra J Lambert: 1992–1995
- Terry R O’Keeffe: 1996–2002
- Richard Powell: 2002–2008
- Stephen Gwilliam: 2008–2012
- Peter Sollis: 2013–2015
- Frank Keighley (acting): 2015–2016
- Andy Mison: 2016–2021
- Lyndall Henman: 2022–current

== Notable alumni ==
- Yvette Berry, Deputy Chief Minister of the Australian Capital Territory
- Rob Beveridge, basketball coach
- Bradley Clyde, rugby league player
- John De Margheriti, engineer and entrepreneur
- Lin Hatfield Dodds, social policy expert
- Alexandra Heller-Nicholas, film critic and author
- Gary Eck, comedian and actor
- Simon Holmes, guitarist
- Andrew McFadden, rugby league coach and former player
- Karen Middleton, journalist
- Rhys Muldoon, actor
- Sally Ninham, historian and former rower
- Fiona Patten, politician
- Sara Zwangobani, actress
