= Warlords II =

1993 video game

- Developer: Strategic Studies Group
- Publisher: Strategic Studies Group
- Producer: Gregor Whiley
- Designers: Steve Fawkner; Roger Keating; Ian Trout; Gregor Whiley
- Artist: Nick Stathopoulos
- Composer: Steve Fawkner
- Series: Warlords
- Platforms: MS-DOS, Classic Mac OS
- Release: 1993: MS-DOS; 1994: Mac
- Genres: Computer wargame, 4x
- Modes: Single-player, multiplayer

Warlords II is computer wargame published in 1993 for MS-DOS and 1994 for Classic Mac OS. It is the second game in the Warlords video game series.

The expansion pack, Warlords II Scenario Builder, was released in 1994. An updated version of the game, Warlords II Deluxe, was released in 1995. It allowed for custom tile, army and city sets for maps and provided support for 256 colours. Thanks to the publication of the editor, Warlords II Deluxe led to an increase of user-created content. Many new maps, army and terrain sets, and scenarios were distributed on the Internet for the game.

== Gameplay ==
Warlords II included five maps, although the later released mission pack increased the number. Another new feature was 'fog of war': optionally, enemy units or even the map could be concealed from players without units close enough to see them. The interface of the game was improved, as were the graphics (with additional unique city graphics for each different player). Moreover, the game featured multiple army, city, and terrain sets (still in 16 colours), play by e-mail as well as hot seat, and a random map generator and map editor.

== Reception ==
Reception

Review score
Publication	Score
Electronic Entertainment	8 out of 10

Computer Gaming World in November 1993 stated that other than the lack of a better victory screen, "every other aspect of Warlord II is worthy of respect and admiration", praising the AI as "one of the finest on the market". The magazine in July 1994 stated that Scenario Builder "succeeds even though it lets you look behind the curtain of one of the most engaging game systems on the market". Rating the scenario editor four stars out of five, the magazine in August liked half of the 24 premade scenarios and concluded that it was "a terrific way to dabble in world creation".

James V. Trunzo reviewed Warlords II Scenario Builder in White Wolf #48 (Oct., 1994), rating it a 4 out of 5 and stated that "the difficult part is in the planning and balancing of the scenario; once that's done, Warlords II makes it easy to turn your ideas into 'reality.'"

Warlords II was a runner-up for Computer Gaming World's Wargame of the Year award in June 1994, losing to Clash of Steel. The editors wrote that the game "takes the award-winning game system and enhances it with more and randomly generated maps, and more diversity in unit types. The AI presses SSG's approach to a new high in versatility and competitiveness". However, it was named the best wargame of 1993 by Computer Games Strategy Plus.

In 1996, Computer Gaming World declared Warlords II the 77th-best computer game ever released.
