= Operation Apocalypse =

1981 video game

- Publisher: Strategic Simulations
- Designer: Roger Keating
- Platform: Apple II
- Release: 1981
- Genre: Computer wargame

Operation Apocalypse is a computer wargame for the Apple II published by Strategic Simulations in 1981.

== Gameplay ==
Operation Apocalypse is a game in which four World War II confrontations are simulated between German and American forces.

== Reception ==
Paul Todd and Russell Sipe reviewed the game for Computer Gaming World, and stated that "Operation Apocalypse is a two player game. But if you can't find someone with which to play, the computer plays a good game. There are no less than four levels of solitaire play. The computer can even play both sides. The game contains sufficient tactical problems and complexity to give it a realistic feel."
