= Australian Game Developers Conference =

The Australian Game Developers Conference (AGDC) was an annual conference from 1999 to 2005 that brought together Australian and overseas game developers, publishers, programmers, artists, production staff, computer graphics companies, audio companies, software tool developers, buyers and suppliers to the game development industry. It was owned by the Academy of Interactive Entertainment (AIE) and was run by Interactive Entertainment Events, a subsidiary of AIE.

== History ==
The inaugural conference was held in Sydney, New South Wales, in 1999. Due to the enormous financial support provided by Multimedia Victoria, the conference was held in Melbourne, Victoria, from 2000 to 2005.

The conference program regularly featured:

- Trade Exhibition
- Schools & Computer Games Academic Summit
- Pitch to Publishers Day
- VIP and Delegate networking functions
- Up to seven concurrent conference sessions
- Keynote presentations
- The Australian Game Developer Awards

=== Speakers ===
International keynote speakers included:

Ian Livingstone - Eidos (UK); Ray Muzyka - Bioware Corp. (Canada); Rob Pardo - Blizzard Entertainment (USA) and Aaron Lieberman - Bungie (USA); Jason Rubin, ex-President, Naughty Dog, Inc. (USA); Bill Roper – Flagship Studios (USA), Laura Fryer, Microsoft Xbox (USA); Ian Fischer, Ensemble Studios; Seamus Blackley, Capital Entertainment Group Inc.; Phil Harrison, Sony Computer Entertainment Europe; Dave Campbell, Discreet; and Lars Gustavsson, DICE.

=== 2005: Final AGDC ===
On the last day of conference proceedings in December 2005, Founder of the Australian Game Developers Conference, John De Margheriti, issued a press release announcing that AIE would stop running the premier industry conference event to allow the industry association, the Game Developers Association of Australia (GDAA), to build a brand new industry conference.

== Other Australian industry conferences ==
Other Australian Industry conferences include:

- GO3 Electronic & Entertainment Expo, which started in 2006
- Australian Effects & Animation Festival, which awards AEAF Awards
- The eGames & Entertainment EXPO, which started in 2006
- Melbourne International Games Week, launched in 2015

== See also ==
- Game Connect
