= Southern Air Command =

Southern Air Command may refer to:

- Southern Air Command (India)
- Southern Air Command SAAF, South Africa
- Southern Air Command (Sweden)
- United States Air Forces Southern Command

== See also ==
- Southern Command (disambiguation)
