= Watson, Australian Capital Territory =

Suburb of Canberra, Australia

Watson
- Suburb
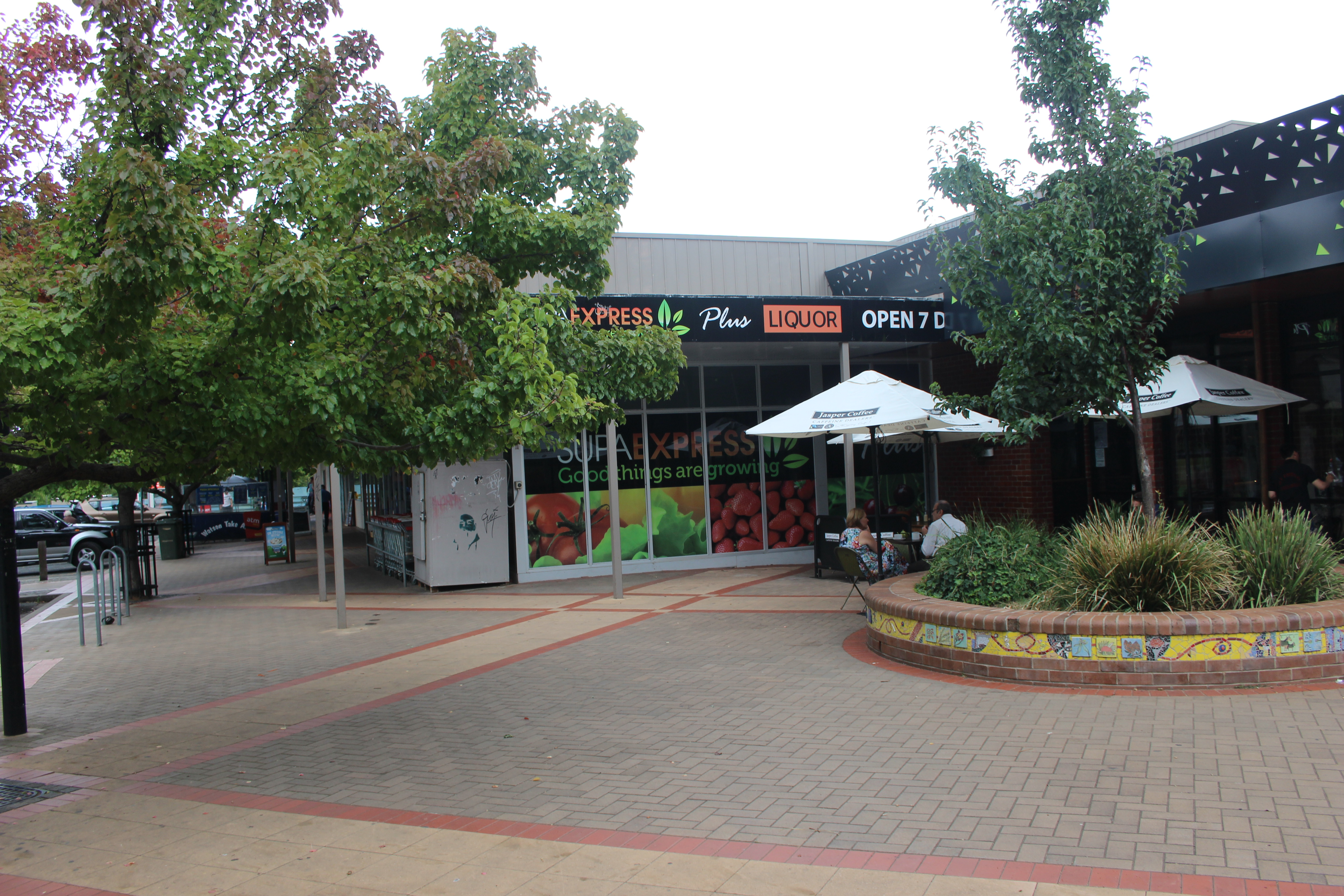
- Watson shops

- Coordinates: 35°14′18″S 149°09′12″E
- Country: Australia
- State: Australian Capital Territory
- City: Canberra
- District: North Canberra
- Location: 7 km (4.3 mi) NNE of Canberra CBD; 27 km (17 mi) NNW of Queanbeyan; 84 km (52 mi) SW of Goulburn; 281 km (175 mi) SW of Sydney
- Established: 1960

Government
  - Territory electorate: Kurrajong
  - Federal division: Canberra

Area
  - Total: 3.7 km^{2} (1.4 sq mi)
- Elevation: 591 m (1,939 ft)

Population
  - Total: 6,727 (SAL 2021)
- Postcode: 2602
Suburbs around Watson
Lyneham	Kenny	Mount Majura
Downer	Watson	Mount Majura
Dickson	Hackett	Hackett

Watson is a suburb of Canberra, Australia in the North Canberra district. Watson is named after the third Prime Minister of Australia, John Christian Watson. The suburb name was gazetted on 7 April 1960. Streets in Watson are named after Australian judges and other legal professionals.

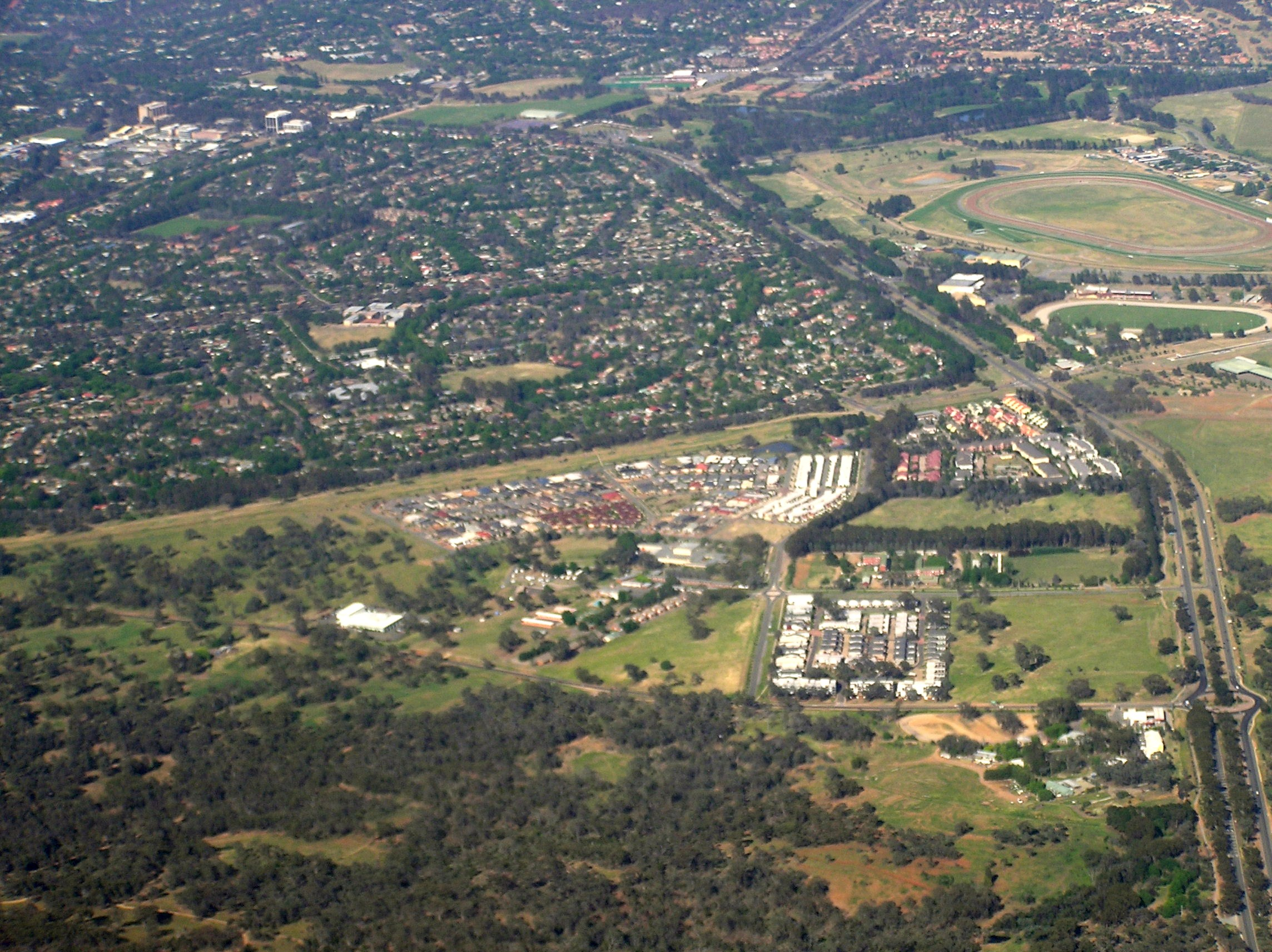
Aerial view of Watson from north east

Watson is bordered by the Federal Highway, Phillip Avenue and Antill Street. Traffic loads on these roads has increased significantly with the continued development of Gungahlin and studies suggest some areas will exceed capacity before 2021.

== Features ==
Located in Watson is a local shopping centre and several schools, television studios and motels. The former Watson High School now houses the Canberra Technology Park which includes the Academy of Interactive Entertainment (AIE) as a tenant. Rosary Catholic Primary School is located in Watson, as is the Signadou campus of the Australian Catholic University. There is also Majura Primary School (originally Watson Primary School) which is well known for its annual Spring Carnival.

The Canberra Hog Farm operated from 1929 to 1956 on a large section of what is now north Watson. One of Canberra's two former drive-in theatres, the Starlight Drive-in, was located on part of the former hog farm site, on the Federal Highway in Watson. The site has now been redeveloped as a medium-density housing complex, although the drive-in's sign remains.

Also located in the suburb are Channel Seven television studios, The Ted Noffs Foundation, the Academy of Interactive Entertainment, Canberra Potters Society, a C3 Church, YWAM (Youth with a Mission) and a BP service station. CTC (now Network 10), was located in the suburb from 1974 until June 2020 when the Watson studios were demolished and the station relocated to Fyshwick.

== Transport ==
Watson is serviced by ACTION bus routes R9 and 50. Antill Street is also serviced by route 53. Phillip Avenue is serviced by the Canberra Light Rail line which runs from Civic to Gungahlin Town Centre.

== Geology ==
Calcareous shales from the Canberra Formation is overlain in places by Quaternary alluvium. This rock includes the limestone of the original title of Canberra "Limestone Plains".
