= Strategic Studies Group =

Video game developer and publisher

- Industry: Video game industry
- Founder: Ian Trout and Roger Keating
- Headquarters: Australia
- Products: Strategy wargames
- Website: ssg.com.au

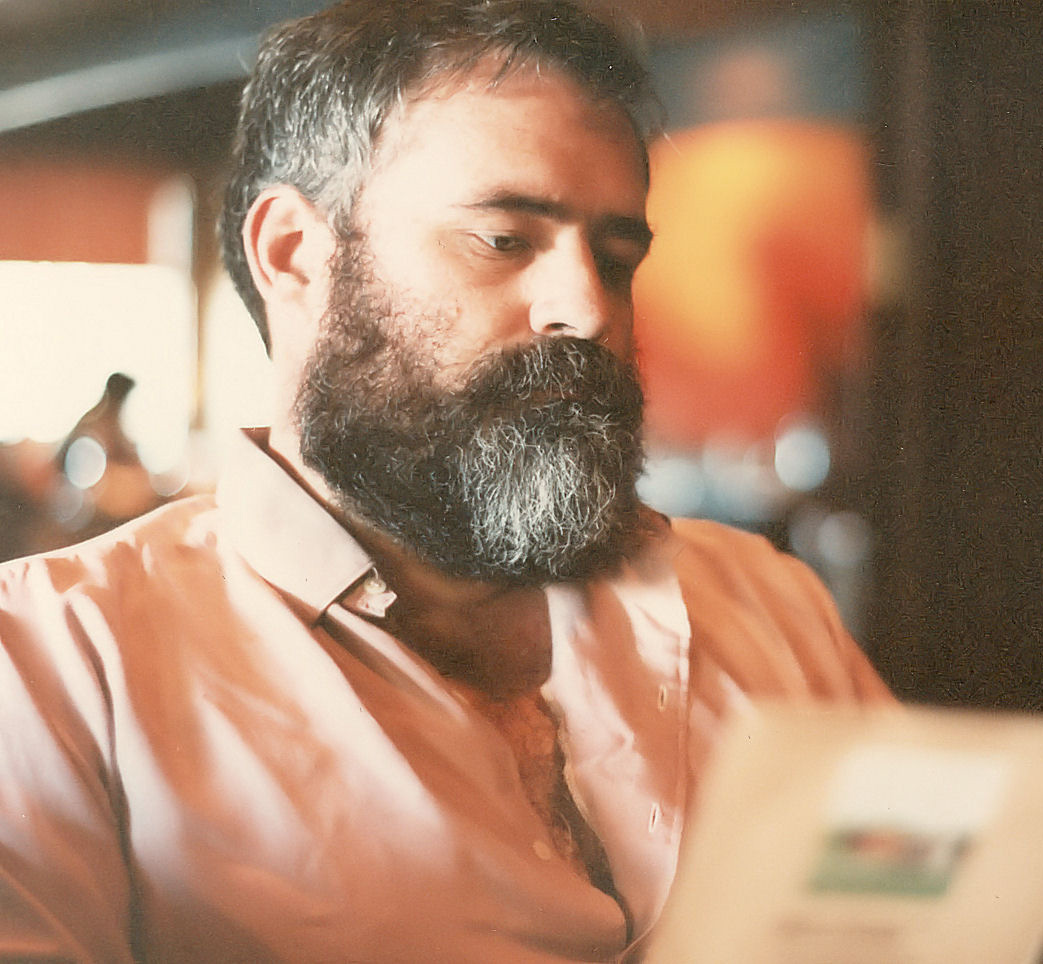
Ian Trout, a cofounder

Strategic Studies Group (SSG) is an Australian software development company that makes primarily strategy wargames.

The company was founded by strategy game enthusiasts Ian Trout and Roger Keating. Trout was proprietor of a military books store and Keating had had several of his games published by Strategic Simulations. The game that launched the company was Reach for the Stars (1983). It is credited for having "effectively launched the genre of 4-X space games - explore, expand, exploit, exterminate". Its success was followed by a string of other, mostly historical military games published throughout the 1980s for Apple II, Atari 8-bit computers, Commodore 64, and IBM PC compatibles.

SSG games include Reach for the Stars, Battlefront, Battles in Normandy, Halls of Montezuma: A Battle History of the U.S. Marine Corps, Europe Ablaze, MacArthur's War: Battles for Korea, Carriers at War, (in three volumes), Rommel, Gold of the Americas, and Decisive Battles of the American Civil War (in three volumes, with the first being Bull Run to Chancellorsville). Several of these titles were also released for 16-bit platforms including the Amiga, Atari ST, Apple IIGS and Macintosh during the late 1980s.

For a time SSG published a tie-in magazine, Run 5, that included articles on historical background to the games, game design, game play and data for setting up new or variant scenarios. Subscribers received a disk with the scenario files already created. Published mostly quarterly it ran for 25 issues.

In 1989, SSG published Fire King an action role-playing game developed by Micro Forté, another Australian games developer.

SSG also produced the Warlords series of fantasy turn-based games. In a mutually friendly decision in 2003, Warlords designer Steve Fawkner broke away from Strategic Studies Group and started Infinite Interactive to publish further Warlords games.

Co-founder Ian Trout died of cancer on 3 August 2011, which left Roger Keating as CEO of the company.

On 19 and 20 June 2014 Roger Keating and Gregor Whiley of SSG attended the Born Digital and Cultural Heritage Conference in Melbourne. Two academic papers were presented at the conference, outlining the contribution of SSG to video gaming history in Australia. Helen Stuckey examined the contribution of the Run 5 magazine to the gaming community, while Dr Fiona Chatteur outlined the development of computer graphics through the lens of Strategic Studies Group.

== Games ==
Year	Title	Developer	Genre	Platform(s)
1983	Reach for the Stars: The Conquest of the Galaxy	Roger Keating, Ian Trout	4X	Apple II, Amiga, C64, MS-DOS, Mac OS
1984	Carriers at War 1941-1945: Fleet Carrier Operations in the Pacific	Roger Keating, Ian Trout	Wargame	Apple II, C64, MS-DOS
1985	Europe Ablaze	Roger Keating, Ian Trout, Eric Baker	Wargame	Apple II, C64
Canceled	The Road to Appotmattox	SSG	Grand Strategy	Apple II, C64
1986	Battlefront	Roger Keating, Ian Trout	Wargame	Apple II, C64
1988	Decisive Battles of the American Civil War: Volume I	SSG	Wargame	Apple II, C64, MS-DOS
1987	Russia: The Great War in the East 1941-1945	Roger Keating, Ian Trout	Wargame	Apple II, C64
1988	Halls of Montezuma	Roger Keating, Ian Trout	Wargame	Apple II, Amiga, C64, MS-DOS
1987	Battles in Normandy	Roger Keating, Ian Trout	Wargame	Apple II, C64
1988	Rommel: Battles for North Africa	Roger Keating, Ian Trout	Wargame	Apple II, C64, MS-DOS
1988	MacArthur's War: Battles for Korea	SSG	Wargame	Apple II, C64, MS-DOS
1989	Decisive Battles of the American Civil War: Volume II	Roger Keating, Ian Trout, Malcolm Power	Wargame	Apple II, MS-DOS, C64
1988	Decisive Battles of the American Civil War: Volume III	SSG	Wargame	Apple II, C64, MS-DOS
1989	Panzer Battles	Roger Keating, Ian Trout	Wargame	Apple II, C64, MS-DOS
1989	Gold of the Americas	SSG	Wargame	Amiga, MS-DOS, Atari ST
1989	Fire King	Micro Forté	RPG	C64, MS-DOS
1990	Warlords	SSG	Turn-based Strategy	Amiga, MS-DOS, Mac
1992	Carriers at War	SSG	Wargame	MS-DOS
1992	Carriers at War II	Roger Keating, Ian Trout	Wargame	MS-DOS, Mac
1993	Carriers at War: Construction Kit	SSG	Wargame	MS-DOS
1993	Warlords II	SSG	Turn-based Strategy	MS-DOS, Mac, Windows Mobile
1994	Warlords II Scenario Builder	SSG	Turn-based Strategy	MS-DOS
1995	Warlords II Deluxe	SSG	Turn-based Strategy	MS-DOS, Mac
1996	The Complete Carriers at War: Fleet Carrier Operations in World War II	SSG	Wargame	MS-DOS
1997	Ardennes Offensive	SSG	Wargame	Windows
1997	Warlords III: Reign of Heroes	SSG	Turn-based Strategy	Windows
1998	Warlords III: Darklords Rising	SSG	Turn-based Strategy	Windows
2000	Reach for the Stars	SSG	4X	Windows
2000	Warlords: Battlecry	SSG	RTS	Windows
Canceled	Dungeon	SSG		Windows
2002	Warlords: Battlecry II	SSG	RTS	Windows
2003	Korsun Pocket	SSG	Wargame	Windows
2003	Korsun Pocket: Across the Dnepr	SSG	Wargame	Windows
2004	Battles in Normandy	SSG	Wargame	Windows
2005	Battles in Italy	SSG	Wargame	Windows
2007	Battlefront	SSG	Wargame	Windows
2008	Kharkov: Disaster on the Donets	SSG	Wargame	Windows
2010	Across the Dnepr 2	SSG	Wargame	Windows
