= Canberra Technology Park =

Business park in Watson, Canberra, Australia

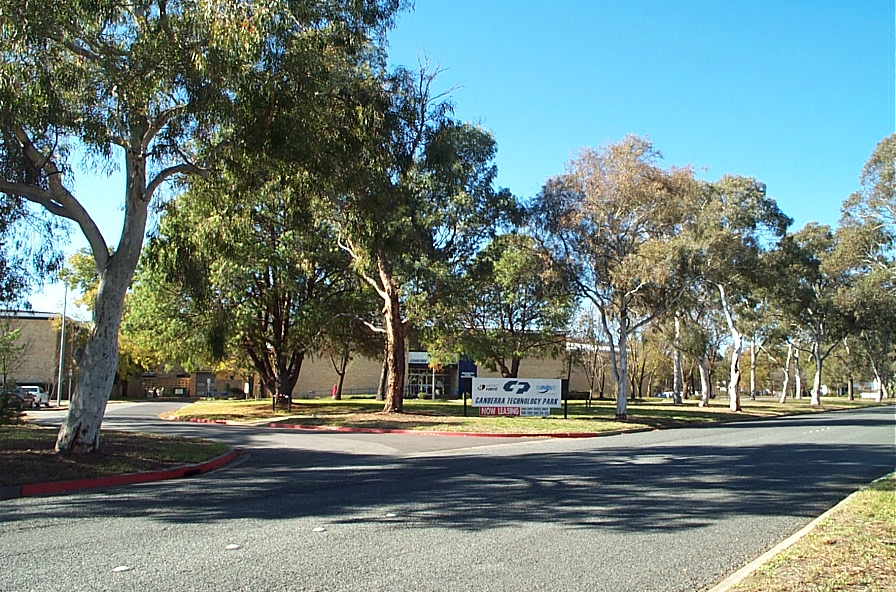
Front view of Canberra Technology Park

Canberra Technology Park is located in Watson, Canberra. It is set on 57,835.2 square metres and is a renovated two level high school. It houses approximately 32 businesses with approximately 200 staff working from the park.
