= Gettysburg: The Turning Point =

1986 video game

- Commodore 64 cover art
- Developer: Strategic Simulations
- Publisher: Strategic Simulations
- Designers: Chuck Kroegel; David Landrey
- Platforms: Amiga, Apple II, Atari 8-bit, Commodore 64, MS-DOS
- Release: NA: 1986
- Genre: Computer wargame

Gettysburg: The Turning Point is a 1986 computer wargame by Strategic Simulations for the Atari 8-bit computers, Apple II, Commodore 64, Amiga, and IBM PC compatibles. An Atari ST version was announced but not released.

== Gameplay ==
Gameplay screenshot (Atari 8-bit)

Gettysburg: The Turning Point is the first in a series of games about the American Civil War, and was the first game to make use of a random schedule for reinforcements on the order of battle.

== Reception ==
Ed Curtis reviewed the game for Computer Gaming World, and stated that "There is little question in my mind that GTP is one of the most enjoyable "conflict simulations" (read—war games) that it has been my pleasure to play in a very long time. After years of interest in the factors leading up to, and the conduct of the American Civil War, it is a very welcome addition to the growing number of games on this subject and possibly the best currently available."

R. F. Batchelder reviewed the game for Computer Gaming World, and stated that "Gettysburg is an award winner and the Amiga port definitely enhances this program. Therefore, it you should be able to concur with me that this improved version is definitely worth the price."

Gettysburg, the Turning Point was awarded the Charles S. Roberts Award for "Best Military or Strategy Computer Game of 1986".

The game was named by Computer Gaming World as the Strategy Game of the Year in 1987. In 1996, Computer Gaming World declared Gettysburg: The Turning Point the 59th-best computer game ever released. The magazine's wargame columnist Terry Coleman named it his pick for the fifth-best computer wargame released by late 1996.
