= Decisive Battles of WWII: Korsun Pocket =

2003 video game

Decisive Battles of WWII Vol 2: Korsun Pocket
- Boxart
- Developer: Strategic Studies Group
- Publisher: Matrix Games
- Platform: Microsoft Windows
- Release: 2003
- Genre: Computer wargame
- Mode: Single player

Decisive Battles of WWII Vol 2: Korsun Pocket is a computer wargame developed by the Strategic Studies Group (SSG). It is the second game in the Decisive Battles of WWII series, following Decisive Battles of WWII: The Ardennes Offensive (1997).

Korsun Pocket received critical acclaim and a number of awards. Upon release, critics from GameSpot, Computer Gaming World and PC Gamer US dubbed it the best traditional computer wargame ever made. In 2004, Korsun Pocket was followed by the third Decisive Battles title, Battles in Normandy.

== Setting ==
The game depicts the historical World War II battle of the Korsun Pocket.

== Development ==
In October 2001, SSG announced a deal with publisher Matrix Games to release Korsun Pocket. It was revealed under the name Decisive Battles of WWII: Korsun Pocket in May 2002. It was shown off by Matrix Games in April 2003. It is the sequel to Decisive Battles of WWII: The Ardennes Offensive. The game was released on August 25, 2003.

In December 2003, SSG released an expansion pack for Korsun Pocket called Across the Dnepr, referring to the Dnieper River in Ukraine. The expansion pack is only available via a download from the Matrix Games website.

== Reception ==
Reception

Review scores
Publication	Score
Computer Gaming World	5/5
GameSpot	8.6/10
PC Gamer (US)	93%

In PC Gamer US, William R. Trotter declared Korsun Pocket "the best wargame ever made for the PC." He praised its combination of extreme detail and accessibility, and argued that "it can be mastered by any novice willing to invest the time and patience", despite single turns requiring an hour of play. Trotter concluded, "It is the Mount Everest, the Beethoven's Ninth, and Moby Dick of PC wargames, and it absolutely qualifies as a genuine work of art." Similarly, Bruce Geryk of Computer Gaming World called Korsun Pocket "the best hex-based computer wargame ever made", and echoed Trotter's praise of its high level of detail. He wrote, "Korsun Pocket manages to capture everything that's compelling about historical wargaming, exclude the tedium, and present it as a tremendous game." Writing for GameSpot, Jeff Lackey echoed Geryk's and Trotter's praise: Korsun Pocket is "easily the best 2D wargame for the PC to date", he argued.

The editors of Computer Gaming World named Korsun Pocket the 2003 "Wargame of the Year". They wrote, "The core design is as outstanding as the interface and presentation, and the A.I. demolishes the myth that war games can't put up a decent fight against a human opponent." GameSpy also declared Korsun Pocket the best computer wargame of 2003, and its editors called it "arguably the best traditional hex-based wargame of all time." It was a nominee for PC Gamer US's 2003 "Best Turn-Based Strategy Game" award, although it lost to Combat Mission: Afrika Korps. The editors called it "the new 'big dog' of the hex-based wargame genre".
