= Decisive Battles of WWII: Battles in Normandy =

2004 wargame video game

Battles in Normandy
- Developer: Strategic Studies Group
- Publisher: Matrix Games
- Platform: Windows
- Release: 15 September 2004
- Genre: Computer wargame
- Mode: Single-player

Decisive Battles of WWII: Battles in Normandy is a 2004 computer wargame developed by Strategic Studies Group and published by Matrix Games. It is the third game in the Decisive Battles of WWII series, following The Ardennes Offensive (1997) and Korsun Pocket (2003). A fourth game in the series, Battles in Italy, was released in 2005.

== Gameplay ==
Set in World War II, Battles in Normandy is a turn-based computer wargame that simulates the conflicts between Germany and Allied forces that surrounded Operation Overlord.

== Development ==
The game features a new game engine different from that of earlier Decisive Battles games.

== Reception ==
Reception

Review scores
Publication	Score
Computer Gaming World	4.5/5
GameSpot	8.4/10

Bob Proctor reviewed the game for Computer Gaming World, and stated that "it adheres tightly to the point of view of a Corps commander. It gives you data on weather, terrain, unit strength and condition but fails to provide any idea of combat odds or why a particular combat result occurred. You get a feel for this only after many games."

GameSpot's Tracy Baker wrote, "Take one of the best operational-level World War II wargame engines ever devised, improve it, and cross it with one of the most compelling campaigns in military history, and you get Battles in Normandy". In Computer Gaming World, Di Luo argued that it "may be the best operational-level computer war game on the market today."

The editors of Computer Gaming World named Battles in Normandy the 2004 "War Game of the Year". They wrote, "This operational-level look at the Normandy campaign is probably the best war game on the market and is a must-have for any war gamer's collection." The game was the winner of the Best 20th Century+ PC Game Charles Roberts Award in 2004. Its release date was 15 September 2004.
