= MacArthur's War: Battles for Korea =

1988 video game

- Publisher(s): Strategic Studies Group
- Platform(s): Apple II, Commodore 64, MS-DOS
- Release: 1988
- Genre(s): Wargame

MacArthur's War: Battles for Korea is a computer wargame published in 1988 by Strategic Studies Group for the Apple II, Commodore 64, and MS-DOS.

== Gameplay ==
MacArthur's War: Battles for Korea is an operational-level simulation game in which the player is a Corps commander in a larger battle or in a series of skirmishes.

== Reception ==
Jay C. Selover reviewed the game for Computer Gaming World, and stated that "Despite the tremendous sweep of the maneuvers during the first year, Korea has never been a "pretty" war and has always been seriously under-represented in wargaming. This alone makes MacArthur's War almost a "must". That the game is a darn good simulation, is easy to learn, and gives you a real feeling for the capabilities and operational limitations of both sides is just an added bonus."
