= Decisive Battles of WWII: The Ardennes Offensive =

1997 video game

- Developer: Strategic Studies Group
- Publisher: Strategic Simulations, Inc.
- Platform: Microsoft Windows
- Release: June 9, 1997
- Genre: Computer wargame
- Modes: Single player, multiplayer

Decisive Battles of WWII: The Ardennes Offensive is a 1997 computer wargame developed by Strategic Studies Group (SSG) and published by Strategic Simulations, Inc.

The Ardennes Offensive failed commercially, but was critically acclaimed. It became the first installment in the Decisive Battles of WWII series, spawning the sequels Decisive Battles of WWII: Korsun Pocket (2003) and Battles in Normandy (2004).

== Gameplay ==
The Ardennes Offensive is a computer wargame that recreates the Battle of the Bulge.

== Development ==
The Ardennes Offensive was initially developed under the name The Last Blitzkrieg, but the title was changed during development for copyright reasons. It was briefly entitled Ardennenkrieg. According to Tim Carter of Computer Gaming World, "The battle has been done so many times in both cardboard and digital format that the publishers had a real problem finding a decent name that had not already been copyrighted." In November 1996, Computer Games Strategy Plus described The Last Blitzkrieg as "long awaited"; the game had experienced an extended development period by that time, which the team attributed to its artificial intelligence code.

The Last Blitzkrieg was officially announced as The Ardennes Offensive in March 1997, as the start of a new deal between developer Strategic Studies Group (SSG) and publisher Strategic Simulations, Inc. It was set for a release date of June. Rock, Paper, Shotgun wrote that the members of SSG "were already development veterans with dozens of strategy releases behind them."

The Ardennes Offensive was released on June 9, 1997.

== Reception ==
Reception

Review scores
Publication	Score
Computer Games Strategy Plus	4.5/5
Computer Gaming World	4/5
PC Gamer (US)	83%
CNET Gamecenter	8/10

The Ardennes Offensive was commercially unsuccessful. However, Robert Mayer of Computer Games Strategy Plus wrote in 1999 that the game had received acclaim, and was "regarded by hardcore wargamers as one of the finest operational level computer wargames ever made".

The game's portrayal of the Battle of the Bulge was praised by critics. In Computer Games Strategy Plus, Phil Thé found it to be "probably one of the best Bulge simulations yet to appear on either paper or silicon." Jim Cobb of Computer Gaming World dubbed it "the best computer game ever on the Battle of the Bulge." Summarizing the game in PC Gamer US, T. Liam McDonald wrote, "Sure, it's just another Bulge game, but it's a very good one."

== Legacy ==
The Ardennes Offensive was initially planned as the first game in a new Decisive Battles of WWII series, and was set to be followed by a game about the Korsun Pocket. Plans for a Korsun Pocket title had existed as early as 1996, when The Ardennes Offensive was known as The Last Blitzkrieg. However, poor sales of The Ardennes Offensive led Strategic Simulations to abandon plans to publish the sequel. As a result, Strategic Studies Group (SSG) chose to recycle the work it had done on the sequel in an updated re-release of The Ardennes Offensive, which was launched online as freeware in December 1999.

According to Wargamer, The Ardennes Offensive "gained a rabid following" in the years following its release as freeware. The wargame genre was transitioning at the time to a digital distribution model, which created an opening for Korsun Pocket. In October 2001, SSG announced a deal with publisher Matrix Games to release Korsun Pocket. It was revealed under the name Decisive Battles of WWII: Korsun Pocket in May 2002. Korsun Pocket was released in 2003. It was followed by Battles in Normandy.
