= Russia: The Great War in the East 1941–1945 =

1987 video game

- Developer(s): Strategic Studies Group
- Publisher(s): Strategic Studies Group
- Platform(s): Apple II, Commodore 64
- Release: 1987
- Genre(s): Computer wargame
- Mode(s): Single player, multiplayer

Russia: The Great War in the East 1941–1945 is a 1987 computer wargame developed and published by Strategic Studies Group.

== Gameplay ==
Russia: The Great War in the East 1941–1945 is a game in which the Eastern Front of World War II is simulated.

== Reception ==
Advising casual players to avoid it, Computer Gaming World described Russia as "a perfect gift for the frustrated strategy gamer who needs a fresh design concept and challenging computer opponent". The magazine's M. Evan Brooks stated that "In conclusion, Russia is the most playable simulation of the Eastern Front on the market. Innovative and interesting, any problems it has are obviated by its successes".

== See also ==
- War in Russia
