= Carriers at War II =

1993 video game

- Developer(s): Strategic Studies Group
- Publisher(s): Strategic Studies Group
- Designer(s): Roger Keating; Ian Trout
- Platform(s): DOS, Macintosh
- Release: 1993
- Genre(s): Wargame
- Mode(s): Single-player

Carriers at War II: Fleet Carrier Operations in Southeast Asia 1936-1946 is a 1993 wargame by Strategic Studies Group for DOS and Macintosh. It's a sequel to the 1992 Carriers at War. In 1996, The Complete Carriers at War was released. It's a compilation that includes Carriers at War, Construction Kit, Carriers at War II, and 30 additional scenarios and new graphics for the German, Italian and French Navies.

== Gameplay ==
Carriers at War II is a strategic war game.

== Reception ==
Reception

Review score
| Publication | Score |
|---|---|
| Hyper | 78/100 |

In May 1994 Computer Gaming World said that Carriers at War II was "an impressive wargaming package", with better graphics and AI than the first game. A longer review in June 1994 said that II had "many improvements, both obvious and subtle". The reviewer praised the improvements on "what was already one of the best AIs in all of gaming", stating that "the AI simulates a reasonably good opponent in ways that most wargames only dream about", and welcomed the extensive simulation of the usually unrepresented Royal Navy in the Pacific. He reported that the game was "remarkably free of bugs and crashes, almost unheard of these days", and welcomed the free upgrade of the first game to the second's graphics and AI, concluding that "CAW II is not merely an excellent game, it is a shining example of why SSG is a leader in the computer wargaming genre".
