= Battlefront (1986 video game) =

1987 video game

- Developer: Strategic Studies Group
- Publisher: Strategic Studies Group
- Designers: Ian Trout; Roger Keating
- Platforms: Apple II, Commodore 64
- Release: 1986
- Genres: Wargame, turn-based strategy
- Modes: Single-player, multiplayer

Battlefront is a computer wargame developed and published by Strategic Studies Group for the Apple II and Commodore 64 in 1986. The game is a turn-based strategy set in World War II.

== Gameplay ==
Battlefront is a corps-level simulation wargame. Upon starting the game, player chooses from one of four scenarios that depict battles of World War II. The scenarios are based on Battle of Crete, Operation Winter Storm, Battle of Saipan, and Siege of Bastogne.

== Development ==
The game was designed and programmed in 14 weeks. Roger Keating created a dedicated disc operating system for the game that allowed rapid access to the data stored on the disc with subsequent reloading of the game screen. Additionally, Keating wrote a novel pathfinding routine that helped to minimize memory usage.

== Reception ==
Jay Selover reviewed the game for Computer Gaming World, and stated that "Battlefront is a very good game which does an excellent job of putting the player into an authentic combat role: that of a Corps commander."

A reviewer of Computer and Video Games praised the game's historical accuracy and the possibility to create custom scenarios, but criticised the graphics. He stated that Battlefront "is a very good attempt, but it is not the perfect game that it might have been".

The game was nominated by Computer Gaming World for Strategy Game of the Year in 1987, but lost to Gettysburg: The Turning Point by Chuck Kroegel. Bruce Geryk in his article "Innovation Wars", published in 2006 in Computer Gaming World described Battlefront as legendary and said that "its landmark gameplay revolutionized the genre".
