= Demon Stalkers =

1987 video game

Demon Stalkers: The Raid on Doomfane
- Developer: Micro Forté
- Publisher: Electronic Arts
- Platforms: Commodore 64, IBM PC
- Release: 1987: C64; 1989: IBM PC
- Genre: Role-playing
- Modes: Single-player, multiplayer

Demon Stalkers: The Raid on Doomfane is an action role-playing video game released in 1987 for the Commodore 64 and in 1989 for IBM PC compatibles. The game is a top-down dungeon crawl about killing monsters during the descent. A sequel, Fire King, was released for the same systems.

== Gameplay ==
The game can be played in either single player mode or two player co-operative mode, using two joysticks, or a joystick plus keyboard. Players can choose to control either the hero, armed with throwing knives, or the heroine, armed with a crossbow. During the game, players will find various relics which permanently increase attack power, defense, or magic power, as well as an arsenal of magic scrolls, and special amulets that create temporary effects. Food can be picked up to heal damage, but occasionally turns out to be poison which hurts the player. Similarly, some scrolls turn out to be a "slow death curse," which takes away the player's health continuously until death, unless the exit from that level is found. Enemies in the game include rats, ghosts who can walk through walls, dervishes who can steal a player's possessions, snappers who remain dormant until disturbed, and mad mages, who shoot fireballs. These monsters emerge from special spawning areas called vortexes, which can be destroyed by the player with several shots, except for the rats, who emerge from indestructible sewer grates.

The dungeon consists of many interconnected maze-like levels which rooms, hallways, and doors. There are several multi-level mazes, where the player must ascend and descend between levels several times before finding the correct path. The collecting of keys to open doors is a fundamental part of the game, while fighting against a horde of monsters. Most of the levels entail some sort of puzzle solving, involving clues in the form of scrolls that are picked up along the way. These scrolls also tell the story of an unsuccessful group of adventurers who journeyed through the dungeon before the current players. This ill-fated party included members Arthur, Bloodaxe, Grindlewald, Furrowfoot, and Imelda, as well as Mellack, a mage whom the previous adventurers met along the way. Correctly answering some questions after each story section yields bonus health points.

Level 100 is unique in the game, as its geography includes large, irregularly shaped caves, rather than straight or diagonal walls as in the other levels. Level 100 also only features one enemy, the demon boss, Calvrak. Demon Stalkers includes its own level-editor, allowing the player to modify all levels except 100.

== Reception ==
A review in Computer Gaming World, comparing the game to Gauntlet, noted "Gauntlet seemed to have ten times more monsters than Demon Stalkers. Thus, despite the similarities, Gauntlet is primarily an action game and Demon Stalkers is a search game with action thrown in". The review concluded by saying neither game would disappoint.

James V. Trunzo reviewed Demon Stalkers in White Wolf #17 (1989) and stated that "If you enjoy non-stop action, grab your crossbow with its unlimited supply of quarrels and get ready to wreak havoc as you fight your way through level after level in Demon Stalker."
