= Gold of the Americas: The Conquest of the New World =

1989 video game

- Developer: Strategic Studies Group
- Publisher: Strategic Studies Group
- Release: 1989
- Genre: Strategy

Gold of the Americas: The Conquest of the New World is a 1989 video game published by Strategic Studies Group.

== Gameplay ==
Gold of the Americas is a game in which a strategy game involves imperial expansion and exploration in the New World.

== Reception ==
Chuck Moss reviewed the game for Computer Gaming World, and stated that "Gold of the Americas is a challenging and entertaining game with a bit of history and good deal of replay value thrown in."

Dave Morris reviewed Gold of the Americas for Games International magazine, and gave it a rating of 8 out of 10, and stated that "it's a good product – even though you may discover, as I did more than once, that final victory is much more likely to go to the (computer-run) breakaway Independent nations of the New World than to the colonial powers of the Old."
