= Halls of Montezuma: A Battle History of the U.S. Marine Corps =

1987 video game

Halls of Montezuma A Battle History of the U.S. Marine Corps
- Developer: Strategic Studies Group
- Publisher: Strategic Studies Group
- Platforms: Apple II; Apple IIGS; Amiga; Commodore 64; MS-DOS
- Release: 1987
- Genre: Wargame

Halls of Montezuma: A Battle History of the U.S. Marine Corps is a computer wargame developed by Strategic Studies Group in 1987 for the Apple II. Ports were released for the Commodore 64, Amiga, MS-DOS, and Apple IIGS.

== Gameplay ==
Halls of Montezuma is a war simulation game that includes all major battles in which the United States Marine Corps were involved.

== Reception ==
In 1988, Dragon gave the game 4 out of 5 stars. Johnny L. Wilson reviewed the game for Computer Gaming World, and stated that "HOM does not allow players to be the 'god of the battlefield,' but it sure offers an Olympian challenge."

In a 1990 survey of wargames Computer Gaming World gave the game three-plus stars out of five, in 1991 three stars, in 1993 three stars, and in 1994 two-plus stars.
