= Decisive Battles of the American Civil War, Vol. 2 =

1988 strategy video game

- Developer(s): Strategic Studies Group
- Publisher(s): Strategic Studies Group
- Platform(s): Apple II, Commodore 64, MS-DOS
- Release: 1988
- Genre(s): Strategy

Decisive Battles of the American Civil War, Vol. 2 is a 1988 computer wargame developed and published by Strategic Studies Group.

== Gameplay ==
Decisive Battles of the American Civil War, Vol. 2 is a game in which five American Civil War battles that took place from the middle of 1862 through the end of 1863 are simulated.

== Reception ==
Jay C. Selover reviewed the game for Computer Gaming World, and stated that "This game is an excellent simulation of Civil War combat."

Jay C. Selover again reviewed the game for Computer Gaming World, and stated that "If my prior review of this game did not put you off completely; you may just have to go out and buy an IBM machine so that you can, at least, properly enjoy the game."
