= The Official America's Cup Sailing Simulation =

1986 video game

- Developer: Wargaming Australia Pty. Ltd.
- Publisher: Electronic Arts
- Platforms: Commodore 64, Amstrad CPC
- Release: 1986

The Official America's Cup Sailing Simulation is a 1986 video game developed by Wargaming Australia Pty. Ltd. and published by Electronic Arts.

== Gameplay ==
The Official America's Cup Sailing Simulation is a game in which the player uses wind conditions, and must make sure to use the correct sail in a sailing simulation.

== Reception ==
Russell Sipe reviewed the game for Computer Gaming World, and stated that "If you enjoyed watching the America's Cup or just want a good sail racing game, AC is just your "cup of tea"."
