= Decisive Battles of the American Civil War, Vol. 3 =

1989 video game

- Publisher(s): Strategic Studies Group
- Platform(s): Apple II, Commodore 64, MS-DOS
- Release: 1988
- Genre(s): Wargame

Decisive Battles of the American Civil War, Vol. 3 is a 1988 computer wargame published by Strategic Studies Group.

== Gameplay ==
Decisive Battles of the American Civil War, Vol. 3 is a game in which the American Civil War is covered from May 1864 through April 1865.

== Reception ==
Joe Sherfy reviewed the game for Computer Gaming World, and stated that "DBACW Volume III is successful because it stresses realism without sacrificing playability. DBACW has brought it all together with a highly playable game which allows the player to determine which variables are most important. While I would recommend that the uninitiated start with Volume I or II of DBACW, the third volume is a must for anyone with a genuine interest in the war or who simply likes a tough challenge."
