= Riot Sydney =

Australian software company

- Formerly: BigWorld Technology (2002-2012); Wargaming Sydney (2012-2022)
- Type: Subsidiary
- Industry: Video games
- Founded: 2002; 24 years ago
- Headquarters: Sydney, Australia
- Key people: Steve Wang (CEO); Simon Hayes (CTO)
- Number of employees: ~65 (2013)
- Parent: Wargaming (2012-2022); Riot Games (2022-present)

Riot Sydney (formerly BigWorld Technology and Wargaming Sydney) is an Australian software company, formed in 2002 by John De Margheriti. It was the developer of BigWorld, a middleware development tool suite for creating massively multiplayer online games (MMO) and virtual worlds. It was the first company that developed a middleware platform for the MMO market. In 2007, BigWorld was recognised by the UK's Develop magazine as an industry leader.

On 7 August 2012, Wargaming – which had used BigWorld as part of the infrastructure for games such as World of Tanks – acquired BigWorld Technology for $45 million. Wargaming stated that it would continue to license and support BigWorld, and foresaw the possibility that it could offer its technologies with BigWorld for third-party licensors. The studio was operated as Wargaming Sydney. On 17 October 2022, Wargaming sold the studio to Riot Games for an undisclosed amount, renaming it to Riot Sydney; the sale excluded the BigWorld technology itself and the studio's publishing arm, which were retained by Wargaming.

== Awards ==
BigWorld Technology has received a number of business and technology innovation related awards:

- 2007 Australian Export Awards – Austrade Arts, Entertainment & Design Award Finalist
- 2007 Finalist of Australian Technology Showcase Patrons Awards
- 2006 Cool Company Awards
- 2006 Finalist of the Secrets of Australian IT Innovation competition, Arts and Entertainment category
- 2005 Winner ACT Chief Minister's Export Award in Art and Entertainment Award
- 2005 Australian Game Developer Awards – Award for Outstanding Innovation
- 2005 Sumea Awards for Best Engine Technology
- Secrets of Australian IT Innovation 2005 Winner – 2nd Prize in Entertainment Category
- 2003 Winner ACT Chief Ministers Export Award in the Arts and Entertainment
- 2003 Winner of the Secrets of Australian IT Innovation competition in the Arts and entertainment category
- 2003 Australian Game Developers Awards – Award for Outstanding Innovation
- 2003 National Finalist of the Austrade Australian Export Award – Arts and Entertainment
- 2003 National Winner in the Panasonic Australia Business Award Category of the Telstra and Australian Government Small Business Awards
- 2002 National Finalist of the Austrade Australian Export Award – Arts and Entertainment
- 2002 Winner ACT Chief Ministers Export Award in the Arts and Entertainment
- 2002 Australian Winner of The Asia Pacific ICT Award (APICTA), Creative Digital Industries category
