= Southern Command (video game) =

1981 video game

- Publisher: Strategic Simulations
- Platform: Apple II
- Release: 1981
- Genre: Wargame

Southern Command is a 1981 video game published by Strategic Simulations for the Apple II.

== Gameplay ==
Southern Command is a game in which the player plays as the Israelis during the Yom Kippur War.

== Reception ==
Bob Proctor reviewed the game for Computer Gaming World, and stated that "Southern Command is an outstanding game and a very realistic historical simulation. The rule book and two reference cards are of SSI's usual (high) quality. The only thing I could want would be an option to play the Egyptian side solitaire, but programming the computer to play the Israelis would not be a trivial task. Still, it will keep me busy trying to crack that Egyptian defense at the highest difficulty level. I urge you to try it too."
