= Academy of Interactive Entertainment =

Australian videos game and animation school

Academy of Interactive Entertainment (AIE)
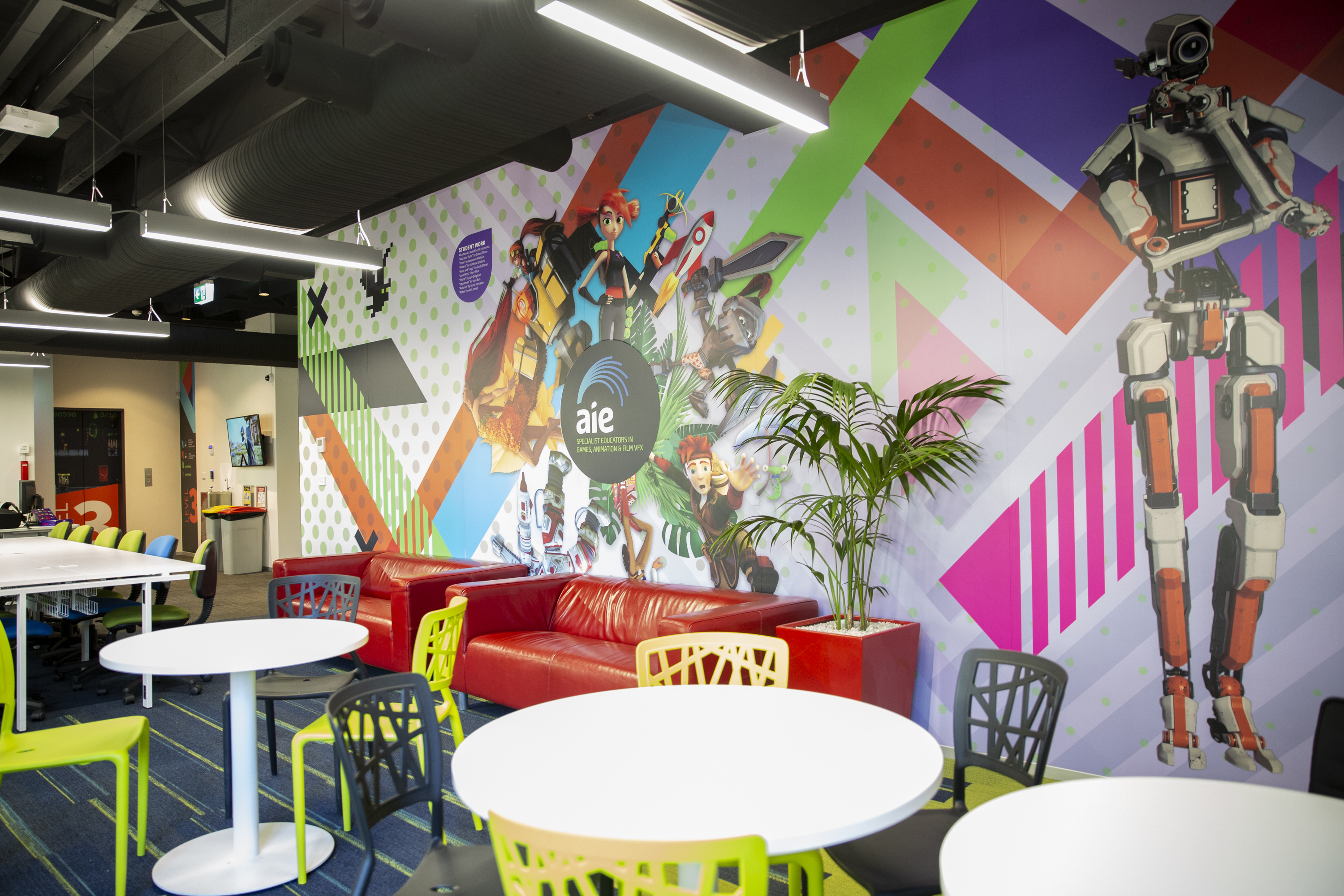
- Established: 1996
- Chairman: John De Margheriti
- Location: 35.2409043°S 149.1499011°E
- Campus: Canberra, Sydney, Melbourne, Adelaide, Lafayette, Seattle and online.
- Website: aie.edu.au

The Academy of Interactive Entertainment (AIE) is an Australian video games and computer animation school. Founded in 1996, it was one of the world's first institutions to offer qualifications in these industries. The AIE provides courses covering CGI, animation, video game asset creation and games programming. Campuses are located in Canberra, Sydney, Melbourne, Adelaide, and an online campus. The Australian ABC has said that the AIE "is one of Australia's most awarded 3D animation, game design and visual FX educators".

== Campuses ==
=== Canberra ===
The first AIE campus was established in Watson, a suburb of Canberra ACT, in 1996. In 2015 AIE submitted a proposal to the ACT government to transform the old Watson high school site – on which AIE is currently located – into a large education precinct, at an estimated cost of $111 million. The proposed development will enable the production of feature films, along with facilities to create special effects for films and games. On site, there will be accommodation providing for 400 students.

=== Adelaide ===
AIE Adelaide has developed a four-player game which is projected onto the facade of a former cinema with four artists pitted against each other to paint platforms as they compete to reach a painting at the top of the screen.

== Partnerships ==
AIE partners with other organisations including Microsoft, with Sony Computer Entertainment Europe, and with Nnooo

== AIE Institute ==
AIE launched its AIE Institute in 2022, offering a Bachelor of Game Development with three majors (game development, game art, and game programming in addition to existing vocational study pathways.

== Students and courses ==
=== Student study options ===
A range of student support options are available for prospective AIE students.

=== Courses ===
==== Filmmaking ====
- Certificate III in Visual Arts
- Diploma of Screen and Media
- Diploma of Visual Arts
- Advanced Diploma of Screen and Media

==== 3D Animation & VFX for Film ====
- Certificate II in Creative Industries
- Certificate III in Screen and Media
- Diploma of Screen and Media
- Diploma of Visual Arts
- Advanced Diploma of Screen and Media

==== Game Art & Animation ====
- Certificate II in Creative Industries
- Certificate III in Screen and Media
- Diploma of Visual Arts
- Diploma of Screen and Media
- Advanced Diploma of Professional Game Development, Specialising in Game Art and Animation
- Bachelor of Game Development, Major in Game Art (AIE Institute)

Game Design & Production

- Certificate III in Design Fundamentals
- Diploma of Screen and Media
- Diploma of Visual Arts
- Advanced Diploma of Professional Game Development, Specialising in Game Design
- Bachelor of Game Development, Major in Game Design (AIE Institute)

Game Programming

- Certificate II in Applied Digital Technologies
- Certificate III in Information Technology (Game Development Foundations)
- Certificate III in Information Technology (C++ Programming Foundations)
- Diploma of Screen and Media
- Diploma of Information Technology
- Advanced Diploma of Professional Game Development, Specialising in Game Programming
- Bachelor of Game Development, Major in Game Programming (AIE Institute)

==== Game Business ====
- Graduate Diploma of Management (Learning) specialising in Games Business

== Awards ==
2007

- Australian National Training Authority – Small Training Provider of the Year (winner)
- ACT Training Excellence Awards – Small Registered Training Organisation of the Year
- One of the top 16 finalists in Tropfest 2007 with The Story of Ned.

2008

- Tropfest finalist and best animation award for Fault.

2012

- Australian Training Awards – Small Registered Training Organisation of the Year (finalist)
- ACT Training Awards – Small Registered Training Organisation of the Year (winner)

2013

- Tropfest 22 Finalist and Winner of the Cadetship Award for student film, Still Life

2015

- Short animated film Lovebites collected awards and screenings at Dubai, Melbourne International Film Festival and many others.

2016

- Australian, Vocational education and training (VET) Awards – Small Training Provider of the Year.

== See also ==
- Video game industry
