= Strategic Command (disambiguation) =

United States Strategic Command is a unified combatant command of the United States.

Strategic Command may also refer to:

- Strategic Command (United Kingdom) now Cyber & Specialist Operations Command
- Strategic Command (film), 1997
- Strategic Command (video game series)
  - Strategic Command: European Theater, 2002
  - Strategic Command 2: Blitzkrieg, 2006
  - Strategic Command WWII Pacific Theater, 2008
  - Strategic Command WWII Global Conflict, 2010
