= Combat mission =

Combat mission may refer to:

- Military operation, the disciplined movement or decisions implemented by specific governments in order to implement strategic or foreign policies
- Combat Mission, the name of a successful series of computer games simulating tactical battles
  - Combat Mission: Beyond Overlord, the first game in the Combat Mission series, 2000
  - Combat Mission: Shock Force, 2007
  - Combat Mission: Battle for Normandy, 2011
- Combat Missions, a 2002 American reality TV show
