= Combat Mission: Beyond Overlord =

2000 video game

- Developer: Big Time Software
- Publishers: Battlefront.com; CDV Software
- Designers: Charles Moylan; Stephen Grammont
- Programmer: Charles Moylan
- Artists: Peter Crafts; Dan Olding; Stephen Grammont
- Writer: William Wilder
- Composer: Charles Moylan
- Series: Combat Mission
- Platforms: Windows, Mac OS
- Release: NA: June 14, 2000; Special Edition: NA: May 29, 2003
- Genre: Computer wargame
- Modes: Single-player, multiplayer

Combat Mission: Beyond Overlord is a 2000 computer wargame developed and published by Big Time Software. It is a simulation of tactical land battles in World War II.

Combat Mission began development at Big Time Software as Computer Squad Leader, an adaptation of the board wargame Advanced Squad Leader. It was set to be published by Avalon Hill. Big Time and Avalon parted ways shortly before the publisher's closure by Hasbro, and Big Time continued development independently, under the new title Combat Mission.

Combat Mission was a commercial and critical hit, and began the Combat Mission series.

== Gameplay ==
Rather than a purely turn-based system, Combat Mission uses the "WeGo" structure for handling player turns.

== Development ==
=== Origins at Avalon Hill ===
In January 1997, Avalon Hill contracted Big Time Software to create a computer version of the publisher's board wargame Advanced Squad Leader. Earlier collaborations between the two included Flight Commander 2 and Over the Reich. Avalon Hill had considered a computer adaptation of Squad Leader for several years, as its board incarnations had sold over 1 million copies by 1997, but the company was initially hesitant to pursue this idea because of the series' complexity. While it ultimately attempted the project with Atomic Games, this version fell through and became the unrelated Close Combat in 1996. Terry Coleman of Computer Gaming World called the decision to try again with Big Time "a breath of fresh air". Discussing the new effort in early 1997, Bill Levay of Avalon forecast a release date of late 1998 or potentially 1999 for Big Time's version, as the developer was slated to create Achtung Spitfire! and an unannounced title for Avalon beforehand. The game was set primarily to adapt Advanced Squad Leader, rather than the original Squad Leader, and Levay remarked that it would stay closer to its board roots than had Atomic's project. However, it was not planned to be a one-to-one translation of the board version. Coleman noted at the time, "The only thing for sure is that the ASL design will be turn-based".

Later in 1997, the title of Big Time Software's game was revealed as Computer Squad Leader. The developer's Charles Moylan explained that the project would automate many of the board version's numerical calculations, and would offer scaling levels of complexity to accommodate novices and veterans. Support for online and play-by-email multiplayer modes was planned. Moylan described Computer Squad Leader as an effort to merge Advanced Squad Leader with "new material" from Big Time. It began production in mid-1997. However, Moylan "suspected problems with Avalon Hill [...] and acted accordingly" as the year progressed, Tom Chick of CNET Gamecenter later wrote. To safeguard his project, he avoided the inclusion of features specific to Advanced Squad Leader until the end of development; early production was focused entirely on material whose copyright was owned by Big Time, rather than Avalon Hill. As a result, the project had "maximum flexibility" in its response to changing circumstances, Moylan said.

Computer Squad Leader was canceled in July 1998 when Big Time parted ways with Avalon Hill, a decision that Moylan attributed to "boring business stuff". The following month, Hasbro purchased Avalon Hill and laid off its entire staff. Despite the shakeup, Computer Squad Leader's lack of copyrighted material allowed Big Time to continue development independently and without any delays, under the new title Combat Mission. A tentative release date was set for spring 1999. By the time of Computer Squad Leader's cancellation, Big Time had implemented the WeGo structure, and a 3D graphics engine had been created that rendered both the environments and characters as polygonal models. The inspiration for the WeGo system came from the wargame TacOps, and was an attempt to merge the strategic depth of turn-based gameplay with the intensity and realism of real-time gameplay.

=== Independent production ===
Following the split from Avalon Hill, Moylan continued work on Combat Mission as Big Time Software's sole employee. He began meeting with Impressions Games' Steve Grammont—who had worked on Robert E. Lee: Civil War General and Lords of the Realm 2—to complete Combat Mission's core design. In a few weeks, the pair devised the game's WeGo system as a compromise between turn-based and real-time strategy mechanics, both of which Moylan and Grammont considered to be flawed approaches.

Moylan later said that his core goal with Combat Mission was to create "the first strategy/war game to combine serious simulation with compelling 3D graphics and sound", and to match the technological advances of first-person shooters and flight simulators that he believed had outpaced wargames.

=== Publication ===
Battlefront.com was established in May 1999. Combat Mission was released on June 14, 2000. The Special Edition of the game was released three years later on May 29, 2003.

== Demo scenarios ==
Three playable public demo scenarios were offered by Battlefront.com at various times. A beta demo was released first in October 1999. A gold demo was released later, and because the file format changed, two new scenarios were included on it that were not compatible with the earlier beta version. Neither demo included access to the mission editor, but did permit solo, hotseat, or email play.

Last Defense and Riesberg were included with the original beta demo. Chance Encounter was originally released as an add-on for the beta demo, at Christmas 1999. It was later also released as part of the Gold Demo. It depicted a meeting engagement late in the war between an American rifle company supported by Sherman tanks, and a German rifle company supported by assault guns. The terrain depicted a rural crossroads overlooked by a forested hill. Chance Encounter has remained a popular scenario and versions of this battle have been recreated by third parties in Combat Mission: Afrika Korps and even Combat Mission: Shock Force.

Valley of Trouble was a new scenario for the gold demo that depicted an American assault through a fortified valley.

== Reception ==
=== Sales ===
According to Moylan, Combat Mission was a hit for Big Time Software, and accrued "good sales" in its first two months. Its simultaneous launch for Mac OS brought a 20% increase in purchases. The game's initial print run was intended to last for one year, but unexpectedly high demand exhausted Big Time's supplies by June 26, following the game's release on May 31. Moylan wrote that the team "drastically underestimated" the game's sales potential, which left them unprepared for and "overwhelmed" by its popularity. The second run was put up for sale on June 29.

Writer T. Liam McDonald highlighted Combat Mission's online distribution model as an element of its success, since word of mouth would allow its audience to grow indefinitely, while wargames sold at brick and mortar retailers had limited shelf lives. By February 2001, the lack of publisher and retailer fees allowed Big Time's revenues on the game to equal roughly "200,000 to 250,000 sales in retail", according to Moylan. A writer for Computer Gaming World considered this proof "that a developer can sell its games exclusively over the Internet and make money", after the relative failure of Sid Meier's Antietam! to break into this market. McDonald similarly called Battlefront.com and Combat Mission positive signs for the future of computer wargames, after mainstream publishers had lost interest in the genre. However, GameSpot proceeded to nominate Combat Mission for its 2000 "Best Game No One Played" award. The website's editors wrote, "[A]lthough sales have exceeded the publisher's initial expectations, they are much lower than typical retail releases."

=== Critical reviews ===
Reception

Aggregate score
Aggregator	Score
GameRankings	88%

Review scores
Publication	Score
Computer Gaming World	5 out of 5
GameSpot	9.1 out of 10
GameZone	7.5 out of 10
IGN	9 out of 10
PC Gamer (US)	91%
PC Zone	75%
Computer Games Strategy Plus	5 out of 5
Electric Playground	9 out of 10

Awards
Publication	Award
Computer Gaming World	Wargame of 2000
PC Gamer US	Best Turn-Based Strategy
Computer Games Magazine	Wargame of the Year (nominee)
GameSpot	Strategy Game of the Year (nominee)
Electric Playground	Best Strategy Game for PC (nominee)
The Wargamer	Game of the Year

Combat Mission received "favorable" reviews according to the review aggregation website GameRankings; McDonald noted in 2000 that it received "the most positive reviews of any wargame in recent memory". GameSpot named it an "Editor's Choice" and noted that "It's sure to appeal to anyone interested in serious military simulations, but even those just looking for a good World War II computer game should find that it has a lot to offer."

The editors of Computer Gaming World named Combat Mission the best wargame of 2000. They argued that the game "altered the basic idea of what a wargame can be", and revolutionized wargames "the way Doom changed first-person shooters." PC Gamer US named it the best turn-based strategy game of 2000, The Electric Playground named it 2000's "Best Independent PC Game" and the editors of Computer Games Magazine nominated it for their 2000 "Wargame of the Year" award. Combat Mission was also a nominee for GameSpot's "Strategy Game of the Year" and Electric Playground's "Best Strategy Game for PC" awards, which went to Shogun: Total War and Sacrifice, respectively. The Academy of Interactive Arts & Sciences nominated Combat Mission: Beyond Overlord for the "Computer Innovation" category at the 4th Annual Interactive Achievement Awards. The Wargamer gave it their 2000 Game of the Year award. They also named Big Time Software as Developer of the Year for their work on Combat Mission.

== Legacy ==
In 2010, the editors of PC Gamer US named Combat Mission the 53rd best computer game ever, and wrote, "Before CMBO, PC wargames were dusty, hexagon-littered creatures. Battlefront's dramatic 3D depiction changed all that." In 2011, Atomic magazine included the game on their list of best historical strategy games. In 2011, Rock Paper Shotgun included the game on their list of greatest PC games, saying: "CMBO's greatness was rooted in its impressive realism and unusual (for a wargame) 3D perspective [...]".
