= Tank commander (disambiguation) =

A tank commander is the commander of the armored vehicle called a tank.

Tank commander may also refer to:

- Tank Commander (video game), a 1995 game for DOS
- Iron Warriors: T-72 Tank Commander, a 2004 video game for Windows
- Gary: Tank Commander, a Scottish television sitcom
