= Flight Commander 2 =

1994 wargame video game

- Developer(s): Big Time Software
- Publisher(s): Avalon Hill
- Designer(s): Charles Moylan
- Platform(s): Microsoft Windows
- Release: 1994
- Genre(s): Computer wargame
- Mode(s): Single-player, multiplayer

Flight Commander 2 is a 1994 computer wargame developed by Big Time Software and published by Avalon Hill. It was designed by Charles Moylan.

== Gameplay ==
Flight Commander 2 is a computer wargame that simulates aerial warfare at the tactical level.

== Development ==
Flight Commander 2 was designed by Charles Moylan, later responsible for Combat Mission. It is the sequel to Moylan's board wargame Flight Commander, which William R. Trotter of PC Gamer US wrote had "gained a small but fanatical following, even though it was too complicated to capture a large market."

The game was released for Mac computers in November 1994.

== Reception ==
Reception

Review score
Publication	Score
PC Gamer (US)	82%

Flight Commander 2 sold fewer than 50,000 units globally. This was part of a trend for Avalon Hill games during the period; Terry Coleman of Computer Gaming World wrote in late 1998 that "no AH game in the past five years" had reached the mark.

William R. Trotter of PC Gamer US gave Flight Commander 2 a positive review, calling it a "thoughtful, intelligent simulation, and one that really has no current competition."

In 1996, Computer Gaming World's wargame columnist Terry Coleman named Flight Commander 2 his pick for the 15th-best computer wargame of all time. In 2017, Tim Stone of Rock, Paper, Shotgun wrote that the game's "brilliant design still hastens heart rates and evaporates evenings more effectively than any other winged wargame I know."

== Legacy ==
Charles Moylan continued working with Avalon Hill on the aerial combat wargames Over the Reich (1996) and Achtung Spitfire! (1997). He went on to found Battlefront.com and designed the game Combat Mission: Beyond Overlord.
