= Strategic Command WW1: The Great War 1914–1918 =

2011 video game

Strategic Command WW1
- Developer(s): Fury Software
- Publisher(s): Battlefront.com (Note: 2017 Steam release published by Slitherine.)
- Designer(s): Hubert Carter
- Platform(s): Windows
- Release: March 1, 2011
- Genre(s): Turn-based strategy
- Mode(s): Single-player, multiplayer

Strategic Command WW1: The Great War 1914-1918 is a grand strategy computer game developed by Canadian studio Fury Software, and published by Battlefront.com in 2011. The fourth game in the Strategic Command series, The Great War is a turn-based strategy set in World War 1. The player controls either the Central Powers or the Entente states.

== Development ==
The game was announced by Fury Software and Battlefront in November 2010, with design being done by Hubert Carter. The game was subsequently released the following May. An expansion, called Strategic Command World War I: Breakthrough! and adding more campaigns including the Russian Civil War and 1912-13 Balkan Wars, was released in 2012.

The game was re-released as Strategic Command Classic: WW1 in 2017.

== Gameplay ==
Like the previous installment, Blitzkrieg, which it shares a game engine with, The Great War 1914-1918 is a turn-based strategy taking place on a map divided into squares (or "tiles"). It is the first game in the series not focusing on the European Theater of World War II, but rather taking place in the titular World War 1.

The main campaign lasts from 1914 until 1919, and takes place on a map covering Europe, the northern Atlantic, and north-western part of North America.

== Reception ==
Jim Cobb, writing in Armchair General, gave the game a positive review with a score of 92%. Cobb praised particularly the wide range of options for ahistorical game play, though did criticise the use of squares/tiles instead of hexes. A 2011 review of the game in the French-language magazine Cyberstratège (later renamed Gazette du Wargamer), the reviewer praised the first world war subject matter and the varied gameplay, but criticized the user interface and old-fashioned graphics.
