= Combat Mission II: Barbarossa to Berlin =

2002 video game

- Developer: Battlefront.com
- Publisher: CDV Software
- Designers: Charles Moylan; Stephen Grammont
- Programmer: Charles Moylan
- Series: Combat Mission
- Platforms: Microsoft Windows, Mac
- Release: Windows: NA: September 20, 2002; EU: October 11, 2002; Mac: NA: 2002
- Genres: Turn-based tactics, Wargame
- Modes: Single-player, multiplayer

Combat Mission II: Barbarossa to Berlin is a 2002 computer wargame developed and published by Battlefront.com. A turn-based computer game about tactical battles in World War II, it is the sequel to Combat Mission: Beyond Overlord. The game has been described as the "reigning champ of east front tactical warfare for the PC."

== Features ==
Barbarossa to Berlin is both a complement to the earlier Combat Mission: Beyond Overlord, in that it presented a different theatre of war, as well as a sequel, by way of improving game features and adding new ones. The playable nations are: Nazi Germany, Soviet Union, Romania (pre- and post- defection), Hungary, Finland, Poland (under Soviet command) and Italy.

In order to conform to German law, depictions of the swastika were removed. Additionally, all Waffen SS units were renamed "Waffen Grenadier".

== Demo ==
A playable public demo is offered by Battlefront.com. The demo did not include access to the mission editor, but did permit solo, hotseat, email or TCP/IP play of two pre-made scenarios.

== Alternate titles ==
The game was originally released as Combat Mission: Barbarossa to Berlin; it was known in Europe as Combat Mission 2.

A Special Edition, known as Combat Mission II: Barbarossa to Berlin (Special Edition) was released with a "bonus disc" which included graphic mods and additional scenarios collected from designers within the CM community.

== Reception ==
Reception

Aggregate score
Aggregator	Score
Metacritic	89/100

Review scores
Publication	Score
Computer Gaming World	4.5/5
GameSpot	9.1/10
GameSpy	5/5
GameZone	8.6/10
IGN	9/10
PC Gamer (UK)	86%
PC Gamer (US)	90%
PC Zone	69%

The game received "generally favorable reviews", just one point short of "universal acclaim", according to the review aggregation website Metacritic. GameSpot named it the second-best computer game of October 2002. It was also a runner-up for GameSpot's annual "Best Single-Player Strategy Game on PC" award, which went to Medieval: Total War.

It was a runner-up for GameSpy's 2002 "PC Strategy Game of the Year" award, which ultimately went to Medieval: Total War. The editors wrote of Combat Mission II, "This sleeper hit might be hard to find, but if you like realistic World War II tactics you owe it to yourself to track down a copy." Barbarossa to Berlin won Computer Gaming World's 2002 "Wargame of the Year" award. The editors wrote that it "doesn't change the genre the way its predecessor did, [but] it still towers high above the competition."
