= CMSF =

CMSS may refer to:

- Canadian Merit Scholarship Foundation, a charitable organization in Canada that grants university scholarships. It was renamed the Loran Scholars Foundation in 2014.
- Combat Mission: Shock Force, a computer video game
