= Down in Flames =

Down in Flames may refer to:

== Games ==
- Down in Flames, a card game published by GMT Games and Dan Verssen Games
- Down in Flames (CORPS), a 1999 supplement for the role-playing game CORPS
- Down in Flames (video game), a 2005 computer video game published by Battlefront.com, based on the aftermentioned card game
  - Down in Flames: Eastern Front, a 2006 expansion pack of the video game

== Songs ==
- "Down in Flames" (Blackhawk song), a 1994 song by Blackhawk
- "Down in Flames" (Semisonic song), a 1996 song by Semisonic
- "Down in Flames", a song by AJ Mitchell
- "Down in Flames", a song by Dead Boys from the 1977 album Young, Loud and Snotty
- "Down in Flames", a song from Zebrahead's 2006 album Broadcast to the World
- "Down in Flames", a song from Relient K's 2001 album The Anatomy of the Tongue in Cheek

== See also ==
- Shot Down in Flames
