= Over the Reich =

1996 video game

- North American cover art
- Developer: Big Time Software
- Publisher: Avalon Hill
- Designers: Charles Moylan, J. D. Webster
- Artist: Stephen Holmes
- Composer: Charles Moylan
- Platforms: Microsoft Windows, Macintosh
- Release: November 26, 1996
- Genre: Computer wargame
- Modes: Single-player, Multiplayer

Over the Reich is a 1996 computer wargame for personal computers operating the Microsoft Windows operating system. The game was released in North America and Europe. A prequel, Achtung Spitfire!, was released in 1997.

== Gameplay ==
The player's squadron of fighter planes are taking on threats from land and from air in this World War II mission.

Players can play as Nazi Germany, the United States of America, or Great Britain. This game combines turn-based dogfighting with strategic manoeuvers as the player must position airplanes to destroy enemies. Authentic clips from World War II help to improve the realism of this video game.

A mostly classical music soundtrack (with some wartime radio music) provides ambiance for the aerial settings. Missions range from trying to liberate Nazi-occupied France by air power to attacking the German military power in the heart of Germany itself. The main menu resembles a vintage World War II hangar with difficulty levels ranging from Cadet (allowing new players to dive directly into the game) to Flight Commander (where incidentals like altitude, speed and attitude have to be manually controlled).

Creating results that are worse than expected will result in somber music. However, achieving results that are better expected will result in swing music being played. Music played during combat is the "Ride of the Valkyries" by Richard Wagner.

== Development ==
Over the Reich was designed by Charles Moylan of Big Time Software. It is an adaptation of the board wargame Over the Reich. Moylan had previously developed Flight Commander 2 for the publisher.

== Reception ==
Reception

Review scores
Publication	Score
Computer Games Strategy Plus	4.5/5
CNET Gamecenter	8/10
MacHome Journal	3.5/5
PC Gamer	85%

Over the Reich sold fewer than 50,000 units globally. This was part of a trend for Avalon Hill games during the period; Terry Coleman of Computer Gaming World wrote in late 1998 that "no AH game in the past five years" had reached the mark.

Over the Reich was a runner-up for Computer Gaming World's 1996 "Wargame of the Year" award, which ultimately went to Battleground: Shiloh. The editors wrote of Over the Reich, "Dogfights are fun, particularly over the Internet, but the real appeal of this game lies in the campaigns, where developing your individual pilots is almost a role-playing game in itself."
