= Combat Mission: Battle for Normandy =

2011 video game

- Developer: Battlefront.com
- Publisher: Battlefront.com
- Series: Combat Mission
- Platforms: Windows; Mac
- Release: May 2011
- Genres: Turn-based, real-time strategy
- Modes: Single-player, multiplayer

Combat Mission: Battle for Normandy (CMBN) is a video game in the Combat Mission series. It is a simulation of infantry combat at the platoon and company level, during World War II, set during the battle of Normandy. The base game models some of the typical American and German army forces in use at that time. Expansion modules (described below) are also available, that provide additional nationalities, locations, and time frames.

== Features ==
Forces included in the game represent troops and vehicles typical of the U.S. Army, U.S. airborne, and German Army in the Normandy campaign following the initial invasion during the period 6 June 1944 to 1 September 1944. Individual squads, vehicles, and weapons are depicted, striving for a high level of realism in troop behavior and weapon effects. There is a detailed description of the features common to all of the games in the Combat Mission Series here. Below is a brief summary of features, from the developer's website:

=== Gameplay ===
- Both RealTime (pausable) or WeGo (turn based, simultaneous turn execution) game modes
- 2-player Game Modes with Realtime over TCP/IP (LAN, Internet), WeGo with PBEM (Play by Email) or Hotseat
- Story driven semi-dynamic campaigns, stand alone (non-campaign) battles, QuickBattle generator, and full featured Editor guarantee endless replayability
- Allied vs. Axis, Allied vs. Allied and Axis vs. Axis play options

=== Editor ===
- Full featured Game and Map Editor to create your own battles and maps - even campaigns - or edit existing battles and maps
- New hierarchical interface to visually select specific vehicles, equipment, and other options for your scenarios
- Unique and diverse mission objectives for each side, including several objective types (e.g. exit zones, unit and terrain based objectives) that can be hidden or known
- Improved Scenario briefing format, including a new Designer Notes subsection
- "Reduced headcount" option to simulate previously depleted formations

=== Quick Battles ===
- Redesigned Quick Battle Generator that includes the ability to "purchase" and "cherry pick" individual units (similar interface as in Editor)
- Unique new optional Rarity system which allows players to include rare units without degrading their ability to have a viable combat force
- Players can now preview maps before playing
- The map can either be manually or randomly selected

=== Units ===
- Meticulously researched TO&E which can be customized by the player
- Comprehensive depiction and modeling of US Army forces, including Infantry, Armored Infantry, Airborne, Armored, and more
- Wide range of German Army (Heer) forces, including Panzergrenadiers, Pioniers, Füsiliers, Sturmgeschütz, Panzer formations, and more
- Dozens of detailed US and German vehicles including tanks, halftracks, self-propelled artillery, trucks, and more
- Dozens of detailed US and German weapons, from small arms like the M1 Garand rifle or MP40 machine pistol, to large crew-served weapons such as mortars and AT Guns.

== Game Engine ==
CMBN is the next generation of an earlier title, Combat Mission: Beyond Overlord, which was released in 2000. The earlier games are now referred to as the "classic" series, and use a core game engine designated "CMx1". CMBN is the first title to use the second generation "CMx2" game engine to depict World War II combat.

In December 2012, after patching to 1.11 version, a Combat Mission: Battle for Normandy 2.0 version was released. This release was marketed as an "upgrade", either downloadable, as a hard-goods items, or both, for the price of $10 (shipping extra) and available only via direct sales. The retail price of the base game dropped by $10 at the same time.

The 2.0 version includes a number of features found in the release of Combat Mission: Fortress Italy which includes refinements to AI and UI in gameplay and scenario editor modes. The 3.0 version upgrade provides additional refinements and enhancements, as found in the game Combat Mission: Red Thunder.

== Expansion Modules ==
=== Commonwealth Forces ===
The original game release included military units of the US and German Armies. The first add-on module, Commonwealth Forces, was released in March, 2012. This module added British, Canadian, and Polish Forces to the units available on the Allies' side. Several new German formations were also added, such as Waffen SS and Luftwaffe Field Divisions. The add-modules require the base game to be playable. The Commonwealth Forces module can be used with either version 1.0 or 2.0 of the base game.

=== Market Garden ===
Market Garden is the second add-on module, released in October, 2013. As described at the web site, "Combat Mission: Market Garden depicts allied Field Marshal Bernard Montgomery's September 1944 dash across Holland [sic] in a daring gambit to leap the Rhine river and enter the heartland of Germany itself. Fielding U.S., British and Polish forces, Operation Market Garden was meant to be the lightning stroke which would end the war that year." Several new terrain types, such as large bridges, new buildings, and larger maps were added, in addition to new types of vehicles and troop formations. The Market Garden module requires version 2 of the base game. It does not require the Commonwealth Forces module.

== Reception ==
Mainstream reviews have been slow to accumulate. The earliest of the mainstream online reviews, NZGamer, rated the game 9/10.

Reception

Aggregate score
| Aggregator | Score |
|---|---|
| GameRankings | 85.67 |

== Awards ==
- Strategy Game of the Year 2011 (Eurogamer.dk)
- Best PC Wargame of 2011 – Gold Community Award, The Wargamer

== Demo ==
As has been tradition with previous Combat Mission releases, a CM:BN demo was offered for free public download on 11 May 2011, with two playable scenarios and a tutorial mission, as well as a functioning scenario editor.
