= Medieval: Total War =

2002 video game

- Box art
- Developer: Creative Assembly
- Publisher: Activision
- Director: Mike Simpson
- Producer: Luci Black
- Designer: Mike Simpson
- Programmer: A. P. Taglione
- Writer: Mike Brunton
- Composer: Jeff van Dyck
- Series: Total War
- Platform: Microsoft Windows
- Release: NA: 20 August 2002; EU: 30 August 2002; Viking Invasion: NA: 6 May 2003; EU: 9 May 2003
- Genres: Turn-based strategy Real-time tactics
- Modes: Single-player; Multiplayer

Medieval: Total War is a turn-based strategy and real-time tactics computer game developed by Creative Assembly and published by Activision. Set in the Middle Ages, it is the second game in the Total War series, following on from the 2000 title Shogun: Total War. Originally announced in August 2001, the game was released in North America on 20 August 2002 and in Europe on 30 August for Microsoft Windows.

Following a similar form of play to Shogun: Total War, the player builds a dynastic empire in Europe, North Africa and the Middle East, spanning the period of 1087 to 1453. Gameplay is both strategic and tactical, with strategy played out in turn-based fashion on a province-by-province level, while military units of varying types and capabilities fight against each other in real time on a 3D battlefield.

Medieval: Total War received acclaim from reviewers; several critics commending it as a milestone in gaming. The real-time battles were praised for their realism and the new feature of siege battles but also received some criticism for unit management. The depth and complexity of the strategy portion was also received well by reviewers, together with well integrated historical accuracy. The game was a commercial success, topping the British video game chart upon release.

== Gameplay ==
Medieval: Total War is based upon the building of an empire across medieval Europe, North Africa and the Middle East. It focuses on the warfare, religion and politics of the time to ultimately lead the player in conquest of the known world. As with the preceding Total War game, Shogun: Total War, the game consists of two broad areas of gameplay: a turn-based campaign map that allows the user to move armies across provinces, control agents, diplomacy, religion, and other tasks needed to run their faction, and a real-time battlefield, where the player directs the land battles and sieges that occur.

The strategic portion of the game divides the campaign map among twenty factions from the period, with a total of twelve being playable. The initial extent of each major faction's territory, and the factions available, depends on the starting period of the game, Early (1087), High (1205) or Late (1321), reflecting the historical state of these factions over time. The factions themselves represent many of the major nations at the time, including the Byzantine Empire, France, England, the Holy Roman Empire and the Turks. Several factions, such as the Golden Horde, emerge during the course of play at their historical time. These factions, together with several other factions appearing at the start of the campaign, are unavailable to the player in the main campaign. Each faction varies in territory, religion and units; however, factions of the same culture share many of their core units.

In addition to the main campaign, Medieval: Total War also features a game mode where the player can undertake various historical campaigns and battles. Historical campaigns allow the player to control a series of famous battles from a war of the medieval period, such as the Hundred Years War and the Crusades, playing as historic commanders like Richard the Lionheart. Individual historic battles have the player controlling a historical figure in an isolated battle that occurred in the era, such as controlling William Wallace through the Battle of Stirling Bridge.

=== Campaign ===
The main campaign of Medieval: Total War involves the player choosing one of the fourteen playable factions and eventually leading them in conquest on the strategy map. Each of the factions controls a number of historical provinces, which on the map contain a castle and, if located by the sea, a port as well. In the campaign, the player controls construction, unit recruitment and the movement of armies, fleets and agents in each of these provinces, using these means to acquire and defend the provinces. Diplomacy and economics are two other aspects the player can use to advance their aims, as well as having access to more clandestine means such as espionage and assassination. Religion is very important in the game, with the player able to convert provinces to their own religions to cement the people's loyalty. Another campaign mode is available, called "Glorious Achievements", in which each faction has several historically-based goals to achieve, which score points; the faction with the most achievement points wins the game. The campaign mode is turn-based, with each turn representing one year, allowing the player to attend to all needs of the faction before allowing the artificial intelligence to carry out the other factions' moves and decisions.

The campaign mode features a strategy map with different provinces, with castles, agents, and armies indicated by figures.

The campaign is carried out in a similar fashion to Shogun: Total War, but features many enhancements. The game is set mainly in Europe, but also features the Middle East and North Africa. Production can occur in every province, with the player building from one of the hundreds of connected buildings and units in the game's technology tree. Income to develop provinces and armies comes from taxation of the provinces and trade with neighbouring provinces. There is no specific technology research, but several advances, such as gunpowder, do become available over time. Castles provide the basis for more developed construction in the game, with players having to upgrade to the next castle level to be able to build more advanced buildings; upgrades such as a curtain wall and guard towers can be added to individual castles. Many buildings have economic functions, such as trading posts that generate money, while others are military buildings and allow the training of more advanced unit types. Whilst there are many common unit types, several unique units are available. These units are either restricted to a single faction or are dependent on the control of a particular province. Each unit possesses different strengths and weaknesses.

Each faction has a variety of different generals, some related to the royal family and in line to the throne, and the rest members of the nobility, who command units in the field and can assume offices of the state. Each of these characters has a base ranking for several attributes, such as command ability and piety, which affects how they carry out duties on the battlefield and governing the provinces. These attributes, and other factors such as health, are influenced by "Vices and Virtues", defining the character's personality and actions. These traits can be acquired seemingly randomly, or may be given to the character through actions in the game. Non-military units, collectively referred to as "agents", may be trained. The types of agent a faction is able to produce depends on its religion, but all factions have emissaries, spies and assassins available to them. Emissaries conduct diplomatic tasks such as start alliances between two factions, or bribe foreign armies; spies allow detailed information to be collected from foreign provinces or characters, while assassins can attempt to kill both foreign and domestic units. Factions also have access to various religious agents to spread their religion, and Christian factions can marry their princesses to domestic generals or other factions for political reasons. Occasionally in the game, a character will be trained bearing the name of a famous historical figure, with better than normal starting abilities. A general such as Richard the Lionheart, El Cid or Saladin will be a capable military commander, while a bishop such as Thomas Becket will have higher piety than normal.

Rebellions can occur if the loyalty of a particular province falls too low, with a rebel army appearing in the province to attempt to assume control from the owners. Civil wars may also take place if several generals commanding large armies have sufficiently low loyalty. In the event of a civil war, the player is given the choice to back either the current rulers or the rebels. It had been planned to allow other factions who had established a prior claim to the throne by marriage to princesses to join in a civil war to claim the throne for themselves; however, this was never implemented. Naval warfare is carried out upon the campaign map, where ships can be built and organised into fleets. These fleets can be used to control the game's sea regions and form sea lanes, allowing trade and troop movement between provinces that have constructed a port. Fleets can engage in sea battles with foreign fleets, although unlike land battles these are resolved by the computer. Religion plays an important aspect in Medieval: Total War, with religious differences between the Catholic, Orthodox and Muslim factions affecting diplomacy and population loyalty. Catholic factions must also respond to the wishes of the Papal States; factions gain favour by refraining from hostilities with other Catholic nations and responding to Crusades, else they run the risk of excommunication. The option to launch a holy war in the form of a Crusade or Jihad is open to both Catholic and Muslim factions.

=== Warfare ===
Battles in Medieval: Total War can have thousands of men on a single battlefield.

The battle system takes place on a 3D battlefield in real-time, instead of the turn-based system of the campaign. Battles are similar to those in Shogun: Total War, where two armies from opposing factions engage in combat until one side is defeated or withdraws. Warfare in Medieval: Total War occurs when the player or the artificial intelligence moves their armies into a province held by a hostile faction. The player is then presented with the option of fighting the battle on the battle map, or allowing the computer to automatically resolve it. Alongside the campaign battles, players have the option of both historical and custom battles, where the player controls what climate, units and terrain will be present on the battlefield.

During battles, players take control of a medieval army containing various units, such as knights and longbowmen, each of which has various advantages, disadvantages and overall effectiveness. Players must use medieval tactics in order to defeat their enemy, using historical formations to give units advantages in different situations. All units in the game gain experience points, known as "valour", which improves unit effectiveness in combat as it increases. Every battle map contains various terrain based upon that of the province on the campaign map, with separate maps for each of the borders between provinces – four hundred unique maps are available for the game. The climate, surroundings and building style for every map varies depending on the part of the world it is located in; for example, a map based in the Middle East will have a hot, sunny climate, sandy terrain and Islamic architecture. Sieges are an important aspect of the game introduced to the Total War series, occurring when the invading army elects to attack the defending army which has retreated inside the province's castle. Upon starting the engagement, the attacker has to fight their way through the castle's defences, winning the battle once the enemy units have been defeated. Each unit in the game has morale, which can increase if a battle is going well for their faction, or decrease in situations such as sustained heavy casualties. Morale can drop low enough to eventually force a unit to rout off the battlefield, with the player having the option to attempt to rally the men back into the battle through their general. Each side's army can capture routing enemy units and ransom them back to the owning faction, with important generals having greater ransom values.

=== Multiplayer ===
Medieval: Total War features a multiplayer game mode similar to that in Shogun: Total War, where players can engage in real-time battles with up to seven other players. Players create and control armies from the factions available in the game, where players can use them to compete in online tournaments or casual battles. The campaign mode cannot be played multiplayer; this feature was later added to the Total War series in Empire: Total War – but only at the beta stage, before being later removed.

== Development ==
Siege battles are a new addition for the Total War series in Medieval: Total War. A castle can consist of several curtain walls; when breached the player must fight for control of the keep.

Medieval: Total War was originally announced by The Creative Assembly on 3 August 2001, with the working title of Crusader: Total War. Development of the game started shortly after the release of Shogun: Total War. Early in development it was decided to change the name to Medieval: Total War; this was to have a name that better reflected the scope of the game. In a press release, The Creative Assembly announced that the game would be published by Activision instead of Electronic Arts, the publisher of the previous games. The Creative Assembly also outlined the features of the game, including the game covering the medieval era from the 11th to 15th century, with players being able to participate in various historical scenarios of the time, such as the Hundred Years' War. Media releases over the subsequent months gave screenshots of the game, with more information on Medieval: Total War's features. The game uses an updated version of the game engine used in Shogun: Total War, allowing larger battles than previously possible with an increased troop limit of ten thousand. The improved game engine also allowed more battle maps than previously possible, now based upon where the conflicting armies are located on the strategy map. Other new battlefield enhancements included terrain detailed with villages and vegetation and improved castle siege mechanics, with players now having to focus on destroying the walls before assaulting and capturing the castle. The game features improved artificial intelligence from Shogun: Total War, with the individual unit AI and the tactical AI—which controls the overall army tactics—separated to more effectively control the opposing forces.

The Creative Assembly's creative director, Michael de Plater, stated in an interview that "We were never 100 percent satisfied with the name 'Crusader'...it didn't cover the full scope or the rich diversity of the game". The focus on the medieval period was chosen because "it was perfectly suited to the direction in which we wanted to take the gameplay....we wanted to have great castles and spectacular sieges." Designer Mike Brunton wrote before the game's release that sieges were one of the most important features to be added to the Total War series, explaining how it led to increasing the troop limit from twenty in Shogun: Total War to over a hundred in Medieval: Total War. For increased authenticity, research was carried out into the medieval period aspects such as assassinations and historical figures. Leaders from the period were included in the game; to represent their personalities and actions the "vices and virtues" system was incorporated into the game, designed to make characters more realistic in their actions.

A demonstration of the game was released on 26 June 2002, featuring tutorial missions and a full single-player mission. The game was released on 20 August in North America and on 30 August in Europe. The Creative Assembly released a patch on 5 November 2002, which was targeted to fix the several bugs that were still present in the game. A new historical battle based on the Battle of Stamford Bridge was later released by The Creative Assembly, made available through Wargamer.

== Reception ==
Medieval: Total War

Aggregate score
Aggregator	Score
Metacritic	88/100

Review scores
Publication	Score
AllGame	4.5/5
Computer Gaming World	5/5
Edge	8/10
Eurogamer	9/10
Game Informer	9.25/10
GameSpot	8.7/10
GameSpy	4.5/5
GameZone	8.6/10
IGN	8.9/10
PC Gamer (US)	82%

Medieval: Total War received "favorable" reviews according to the review aggregation website Metacritic. In the United Kingdom, the game went straight to the top of the video game chart after its release, staying at the top for two weeks. It ultimately received a "Silver" sales award from the Entertainment and Leisure Software Publishers Association (ELSPA), indicating sales of at least 100,000 copies in the United Kingdom. The United States charts saw Medieval: Total War reach fourth in its second week after release, behind Warcraft III, The Sims and its expansion The Sims: Vacation. It sold over 100,000 copies in the region by August 2006, but was beaten by its successor Rome: Total War's 390,000 sales there.

Reviewers praised the many different factors adding to complexity of the campaign, ActionTrip noting that "Medieval adds a new strategic balance to the game, which teaches that great empires come with an even greater responsibility". Eurogamer praised the way the player had to manage production queues, guard the loyalty of important generals and make use of spies and assassins, calling the level of control "far ahead of anything seen in the previous game"; many other reviews shared a similar view. The number of factions in the game, each with their own historically accurate units and territories, was commended, with IGN and Game Informer stating it "gives the game huge replay value", with GameSpot adding "the strategic portion now has a lot more options". Many reviewers gave praise to the fact the historical setting of the Middle Ages was said to be well integrated into the game; PC Zone acknowledging the "brutality and instability" of the era is well included in the game, with GameSpot praising the religion in the game, "religion played an enormous role in shaping history, and so it is in the game". GameSpy stated that the different historical starting positions made the games attention to detail "impressive and noteworthy"; the historical battle system was also highly received from Computer Gaming World, stating that they successfully "provide an authentic glimpse of the past". However, GameSpot commented on a problem with a lack of information, "you'll have a tough time keeping track of all the goings-on in your provinces", suggesting this could be solved through a more informative interface. Overall, reviewers highly complimented the strategic gameplay, many saying it was similar to a Civilization-style game.

The battle system in Medieval: Total War was considered by many reviewers to be the highlight of the game. In their review, Eurogamer felt "The sensation of scale and drama in these conflicts is incredible", praising the visual effects and combat. The different battlefields and their environments were praised by IGN, with ActionTrip agreeing that "Medieval: Total War looks better than Shogun", adding that the terrain and units are more detailed than those in Shogun: Total War. GameSpot praised the realistic battles, mentioning that the real-world battlefield considerations like fatigue, ammunition, facing, and morale included in the game was a "welcome change". GameSpy also stated the "chaotic" battles were appropriate to the era, but criticised the siege aspect, claiming it to be "too plain and underwhelming", with a lack of detail compared to the other 3D elements. The soundtrack to the game was well received by IGN, "The soundtrack is full of rousing context-sensitive orchestra moments which get you in the mood for bloody slaughter" commenting it is fitting for a game that "delivers body counts like no other" ActionTrip also admired how the game's music changed pace as the battle commenced, praising The Creative Assembly for its "masterfully placed audio and visual effects". The artificial intelligence for Medieval: Total War was thought to be much improved over its predecessor, CGW mentioning the AI was intelligent enough to prevent brute force alone from winning fights. Criticism was received on the larger battles giving low frame rates and performance, while ActionTrip also noted several unit management issues with path-finding and unit facing, stating "it's demoralising to see archers facing the wrong way".

Medieval: Total War received very favourable reviews, despite a few criticisms, gaining high distinction from the industry. GameSpot summarised by saying that while the game "isn't well suited for the casual gamer", most strategy gamers will "find a lot to like in it, for a very long time." Although GameSpy described Medieval: Total War as "hit[ting] a few bumps in the road", they mentioned the game has enough to keep players interested for many months. Eurogamer was enthusiastic in pronouncing Medieval: Total War "a milestone in gaming". IGN closed by stating that the game "delivers an encompassing experience", while CGW finished by proclaiming "there simply isn't enough room in this magazine to extol its virtues."

=== Awards ===
Medieval: Total War was the recipient of a number of industry awards. PC Gamer UK named it the top game of 2002, replacing the previous entry, Valve's Half-Life. In awarding the distinction, PC Gamer stated: "It was the only contender." The game received an EMMA award in Technical Excellence for its audio by Jeff van Dyck, commended for having a "game soundtrack and score that is lush, well-mixed, and adds dynamically to the gameplay. The extensive diverse musical tracks sound authentic and fully engage the user." The game received a number of distinctions from game publications, such as the "Best Strategy Game of 2002" award from GameSpy, mentioning "It's not that Medieval is just two great games in one. It's two games that feed off of one another for the ultimate rush." The Creative Assembly itself was also awarded the European Computer Trade Show PC Game Developer of the Year award, for the production of Medieval: Total War.

GameSpot selected Medieval as the best computer game of August 2002, and later presented the game with its annual "Best Single-Player Strategy Game on PC" award. The editors of Computer Games Magazine named it the eighth-best computer game of 2002, and called it "rich in atmosphere and compelling for long hours." It was nominated for PC Gamer US's "2002 Best Turn-Based Strategy Game" and Computer Gaming World's "Strategy Game of the Year" awards, which ultimately went to Combat Mission: Barbarossa to Berlin and Freedom Force, respectively. The latter magazine's editors highlighted Medieval's "grandeur and flourish in simulating European history". During the AIAS' 6th Annual Interactive Achievement Awards, Medieval: Total War received a nomination for "Computer Strategy Game of the Year"; it was ultimately awarded to Warcraft III: Reign of Chaos.

== Expansions and versions ==
The Creative Assembly announced the development of an expansion pack, Medieval: Total War – Viking Invasion, on 7 January 2003. The Viking Invasion expansion pack adds a Viking campaign taking place from 793 to 1066, set upon an expanded map of the British Isles and western Scandinavia. The campaign replaces the original factions with earlier Anglo-Saxon and Celtic kingdoms such as Wessex, Mercia, Wales and Scotland, as well as the Vikings. The Viking faction is designed to raid the British Isles; to achieve this the faction has access to faster ships and gains money for every building destroyed upon the battle map. The Anglo-Saxon and Celtic factions have the goal of repelling the Vikings and ultimately controlling the British Isles. New historical units were included with the expansion pack, such as the huskarls. Medieval: Total War: Viking Invasion brought several enhancements that were also added to the original campaign: flaming ammunition giving the player an option to set alight enemy castles, and a pre-battle deployment screen, allowing the player to organise their forces and view the terrain and opposing forces before the battle begins. In addition, three new factions were added to the main Medieval: Total War campaign, along with ribauldequin artillery and the game's patch. The expansion pack was released on 6 May 2003 in the United States and on 9 May in the United Kingdom.

Activision, the game's publisher, produced a combination of Medieval: Total War and Medieval: Total War: Viking Invasion, called the Medieval: Total War Battle Collection, released on 7 January 2004. Medieval: Total War Battle Collection contained both games, patched to the latest version, and their manuals. On 30 June 2006, Sega, the company that took over the publishing of the series, released a collector's edition version of the Total War series, called Total War: Eras. The edition included patched versions of Shogun: Total War, Medieval: Total War and Rome: Total War, together with their expansion packs, a documentary detailing the creation of the game series, and Total War memorabilia.

=== Reception ===
Medieval: Total War - Viking Invasion

Aggregate score
Aggregator	Score
Metacritic	84/100

Review scores
Publication	Score
Computer Gaming World	4.5/5
Edge	7/10
Eurogamer	8/10
Game Informer	8.75/10
GameSpot	8.2/10
GameSpy	4.5/5
GameZone	8.6/10
IGN	8.6/10
PC Gamer (US)	75%

Viking Invasion received "favorable" reviews, albeit slightly less than the original Medieval: Total War, according to Metacritic. Reviewers felt the new gameplay features for the Vikings were the most important enhancement of the expansion pack, with Eurogamer commending the Vikings' raiding system as something that fixes what "the original Medieval lacked". ActionTrip praised the new campaign as being a challenge for players: "even on the normal difficulty setting, Viking Invasion is a very challenging game", a view shared by other critics. The pre-battle screen was commended by GameSpot, calling it a "handy new feature." GameSpot also praised the new additions to the original campaign, mentioning they have "made castle sieges more interesting". The main criticism for Medieval: Total War – Viking Invasion was the graphics, with both ActionTrip and Eurogamer stating that they were "starting to feel a little bit creaky". A lack of new multiplayer options was considered by GameSpot to be "unfortunate", mentioning that "a multiplayer campaign option would have been a great new feature". Overall, the expansion was received well by critics in the industry. IGN concluded by saying fans "won't be disappointed with the Viking Invasion", while Actiontrip finished stating; "the graphics are beginning to look old" but the challenge made the expansion "worth it". The review by GameSpot finished by saying "overall, the expansion is a great addition to Medieval", and Eurogamer concluded with praising the addition it made to Medieval: Total War: "It's a worthy expansion pack to a truly excellent game".

The editors of Computer Gaming World nominated Viking Invasion for their 2003 "Expansion Pack of the Year" award, but it lost to Battlefield 1942: Secret Weapons of WWII. It was also a runner-up for Computer Games Magazine's "Expansion of the Year" award, which ultimately went to EverQuest: Lost Dungeons of Norrath.
