= Theatre of War (video game) =

2006 video game by 1C Company

- Developer: 1C Company
- Publishers: RUS: 1C Company; WW: Battlefront.com; Kalypso Media: CDV Software
- Producer: Yury Miroshnikov
- Designer: Oleg Bazarnov
- Programmer: Igor Skripachev
- Artist: Pavel Mitrofanov
- Platform: Microsoft Windows
- Release: 20 October 2006 (Russia); 19 April 2007 (Europe)
- Genre: Strategy
- Modes: Single player, multiplayer

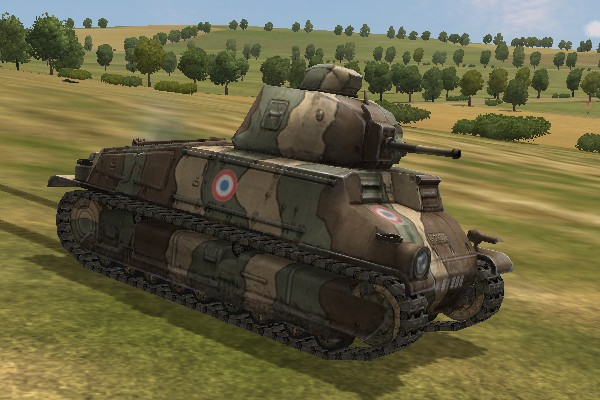
Still image from the game (tank shown here is the Somua S35)

Theatre of War (Russian: Вторая мировая) is a real-time tactical strategy game centering on the decisive battles in the European Theatre of World War II 1939–1945. The game allows the player to control armed forces of France, Germany, Poland, The USSR, United Kingdom or the United States (combined in actual campaign) in over 40 missions. Players will command a special task force composed of different kinds of units, including tanks, APCs, field guns, mortars, various infantry regiments and will also have an opportunity to call for artillery and air support. With a focus on unit detail and combat realism, would-be generals are faced with authentic battle scenarios, taken straight from actual World War II records and maps.

The game was developed by 1C Company and released for purchase via the Internet on 19 April 2007. It received two sequels, Theatre of War 2 and Theatre of War 3.

== Reception ==
Reception

Aggregate score
Aggregator	Score
Metacritic	66%

Review scores
Publication	Score
GameSpot	7.8/10
GamesRadar+	3.5/5
IGN	7/10
