= Steg =

Steg may refer to:

Places

- Steg, Liechtenstein, a village in Liechtenstein
- Steg, Valais, a village in the Swiss canton of Valais
- Steg, Zurich, a village in the Swiss canton of Zurich

Other uses

- Steg (video game)
- Staats-Eisenbahn-Gesellschaft (StEG), a railway of the Austro-Hungarian Empire
- Tunisian Company of Electricity and Gas, in French: Société tunisienne de l'électricité et du gaz (STEG)
