= Shogun: Total War =

2000 video game

- Developer: Creative Assembly
- Publishers: Electronic Arts; Sold Out; Sega
- Director: Michael Simpson
- Composer: Jeff van Dyck
- Series: Total War
- Platform: Microsoft Windows
- Release: NA: 12 June 2000; EU: 16 June 2000; Warlord Edition: NA: 13 August 2001; EU: 2 November 2001; The Mongol Invasion: EU: 8 August 2001
- Genres: Turn-based strategy, real-time tactics
- Modes: Single-player, multiplayer

Shogun: Total War is a turn-based strategy and real-time tactics video game developed by The Creative Assembly and published by Electronic Arts for Microsoft Windows personal computers. Released in June 2000, the game became the debut title in The Creative Assembly's Total War series. Set in Japan during Sengoku jidai—the "Warring States" period from the 15th to the beginning of the 17th century—the game has players adopt the leader of a contemporary Japanese clan, attempt to conquer the nation and claim the position of shōgun. The turn-based aspect of the game focuses on a map of Japan where military force, religion, diplomacy, espionage and economics all influence the player's actions, whilst battles are fought in a 3D real-time mode.

Announced in early 1999, Shogun: Total War was The Creative Assembly's first high business risk product; previous products had involved creating video games for the EA Sports brand. The game was initially conceived as a real-time strategy "B-title" powered by 2D computer graphics following the popularisation of the genre through titles such as Command & Conquer. However, the proliferation of 3D video cards amongst consumers led to a transition to 3D graphics. Through the course of development, Shogun: Total War evolved into a real-time tactics game with a focus on historical authenticity; military historian Stephen Turnbull advised The Creative Assembly in this regard. The turn-based campaign map was added to include context for the real-time battles.

Shogun: Total War was well received critically, though complaints surfaced regarding glitches in the game. An expansion pack, The Mongol Invasion, followed only in Europe in August 2001, adding a playable version of the Mongol invasions of Japan. The game's positive reception and sales paved the way for the development of successive Total War releases set in different times and regions. Total War: Shogun 2 is a sequel which returns to the Sengoku period albeit with all the improvements in graphical technology and gameplay since the first game. It was announced in June 2010 and released in March 2011.

== Gameplay ==
Shogun: Total War is focused on samurai warfare in the Sengoku period of Japanese history, which lasted from the mid-15th century to the beginning of the 17th century. The game puts the player in the position of a Japanese daimyō with the objective of conquering Japan through military might, diplomacy, espionage, trade, and religion—thereby taking the position of shōgun. Shogun incorporates two main areas of play: The turn-based campaign map is where the player moves their armies, conducts diplomacy, builds the infrastructure of their provinces and performs various other tasks necessary to run their faction. The real-time element of the game allows the player to assume command of one of their armies and personally direct the course of any battles that take place.

The game consists of seven factions which the player can choose to play as each one of Japan's historical clans. The island of Kyūshū and the southwestern end of Honshū incorporates the Shimazu, Mōri and Takeda clans, while the Oda and Imagawa clans control the central parts of Honshū. The northern parts of Honshū are home to the Uesugi and Hōjō clans. While each clan has access to the same broad units and technology and begins the game with roughly the same amount of land, each clan has a specific advantage in a particular area. For instance, the Imagawa clan trains more efficient espionage agents, while the Takeda clan can produce higher quality cavalry, etc. Smaller, independent factions are represented as rebel clans and rōnin.

=== Campaign ===
The main campaign of Shogun: Total War involves a player choosing a clan and moving to eliminate their enemies and become shogun of feudal Japan. Each faction controls various historical provinces. Each province allows for the cultivation of farmland, and the construction of border watchtowers and a castle. Certain provinces possess natural resources that require a mine to be constructed to tap into. Coastal provinces may also construct ports to increase trade. Each castle has space to expand with a variety of military buildings and dojos, which allow for specific army units and agents to be produced. However, each castle can only support a certain number of auxiliary buildings. Castles can be upgraded to increase their defences and resilience to a siege. The production of units and construction of buildings is limited by the amount of koku the player has; koku is generated depending on the strength of the faction's economy and harvest. Units and buildings take time to produce; each turn represents one season.

Much of the game takes place on a turn-based strategy map of Japan.

During each turn, the player is able to move units about the map. Units come as either armies or agents and can only be moved to a province that borders the one in which they reside. However, both agents and armies can travel longer distances using ports, allowing them to move from one coastal province to another with a port in a single turn. Armies consist of military units such as spearmen, cavalry and archers. Should an army enter a battle, these units will be reproduced for the game's real-time tactics mode. Each army is led by a general that possesses an honour rating that rises and falls with the general's success or failure; if a general repeatedly endures defeat, they may commit seppuku. The faction daimyō and his heirs are also represented as generals—if a daimyō is killed and has no available heirs, the faction is eliminated from the game.

When an army is moved into an enemy or neutral province, it will engage in battle with whatever hostile armies already reside in the province. An army may also lay siege to a province's castle; after a determined amount of time, a castle's supplies will run out and the garrison will be forced to surrender if it does not break the siege or receive relief. A siege may cause damage to the castle's buildings, requiring repairs to be sought.

Several agents are available to each faction. The basic agent is the emissary, which can be used to negotiate alliances and ceasefires, as well as attempt to bribe enemy or neutral armies to join the player's faction. As factions build up their infrastructure, other agents become available, such as ninja and shinobi, the former assassinates enemy generals and agents, while the latter can spy on enemy provinces or perform counter-insurgency in home provinces. Each agent has an honour rating that determines how successful they may be at any particular mission. As the game progresses, the player will come into contact with European traders; first the Portuguese Jesuits, who will exchange arquebuses for money and the adoption of Catholicism by the clan, and later the Dutch, who will sell arquebuses without requiring a conversion. If a faction changes from Buddhism to Catholicism, it is given the ability to produce Jesuit priests, who in addition to acting as emissaries, convert the population, therefore making rebellions due to religion less likely.

=== Warfare ===
A siege battle underway in the game's real-time tactics element

The battle system forms the second area of gameplay. Unlike the campaign part of the game, players control battles in real-time. However, should the player choose, the game can automatically resolve battles on the campaign map, taking into account factors such as the strength of numbers, the weapons used, and the terrain. Outside of the main campaign mode, players can participate in recreations of the historical battles that comprised the Sengoku period. In each battle, players are given access to an army consisting of a variety of units. Units come in the form of samurai and ashigaru, and fall into the categories of archers, spearmen, cavalry and heavy infantry. Each unit has its own intrinsic advantages, disadvantages, cost and overall level of effectiveness.

Players must use contemporary tactics and formations with the units they have available to defeat their enemies; the teachings of Sun Tzu's The Art of War are integral to the tactics used by the game's artificial intelligence and for the player to succeed. The terrain of the battlefield and the weather impact on how a battle is fought. Each unit has morale, which can increase if the battle goes well for their clan or decrease in cases such as heavy casualties or the death of the general. If a unit's morale is broken, they will rout; in certain circumstances, however, routing units may be rallied by the general. Victory in battle is achieved by causing every enemy unit to rout, or by killing the opposing army. Armies can lay siege to castles, replacing open land battles with close-quarters combat within the confines of the castle walls.

=== Multiplayer ===
Originally, Electronic Arts hosted the multiplayer for Shogun: Total War. There were two separate servers; one for Shogun: Total War, and one for Warlord Edition. In the foyer, players had their points next to their names. These points were called honour. A player started with 100 honour. Based on winning or losing, the player gained or lost honour. In order to prevent an expert from playing a lot of beginners and gaining a lot of honour, an expert who had 49 more honour points than the beginner would lose points even if he beat that beginner. The honour system was implemented to make the multiplayer more fun and challenging. If players wanted to play without a change in honour points, then the host could simply set the game to 'friendly' mode. The Shogun servers had many players when EA hosted them. Role-playing was very popular and this period is considered by many fans as the best and most nostalgic. The battles themselves were very fast-paced, unforgiving to mistakes and highly reliant on individual skill both in army selection and, above all, army control. In Shogun, any army could win over another using clever, fast and precise strategies. In later Total War games, army selection was given more importance.

Before Rome: Total War was launched by Activision, EA shut down both the Shogun: Total War and the Warlord Edition servers. The players turned to the other Total War series, while the new players avoided the Shogun series. Some players wanted to return to Shogun: Total War. They hosted their own servers where players could join without registering.

== Development ==
Shogun: Total War was announced in early 1999, developed by The Creative Assembly under Electronic Arts. The Creative Assembly had previously been involved with Electronic Arts, producing games for the EA Sports brand. Development was led by Michael Simpson, a former microchip designer who had joined the company three years prior. According to Simpson, Shogun was conceived when the Creative Assembly established a secondary development team from their EA Sports designers to develop an alternate, low business risk product for the company. At the time, Command & Conquer had risen to success, inspiring the creation of a number of similar real-time strategy games. Simpson's development team therefore initially planned to create a "B-title RTS game".

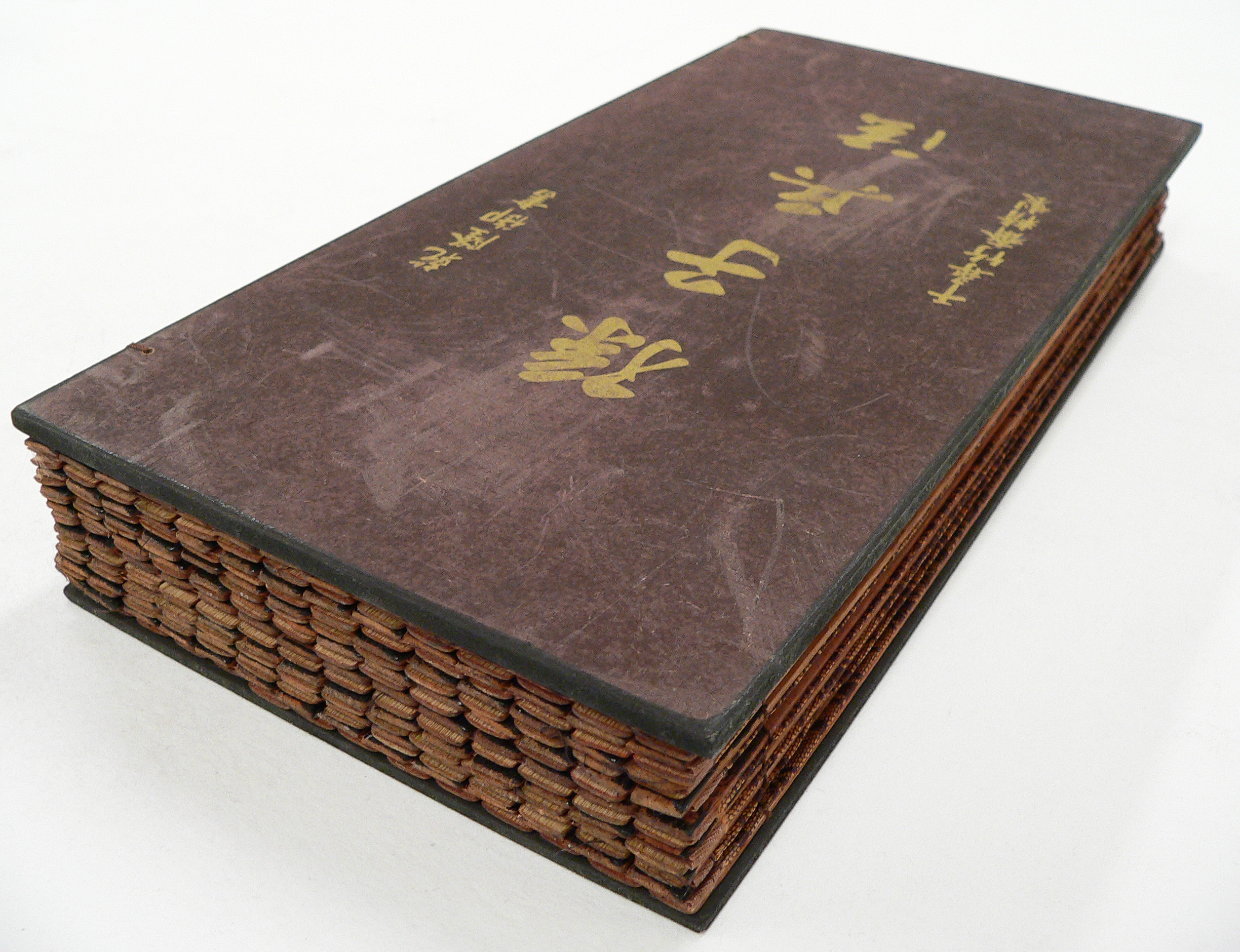
The Art of War by Chinese military expert Sun Tzu is central to tactics and the game's artificial intelligence.

As development progressed, 3dfx video cards began to proliferate amongst consumers, leading the Creative Assembly to move the game from 2D to 3D computer graphics. Initially sceptical of the results of using 3D graphics, Simpson was surprised when a 3D rendered landscape turned out to be feasible for gameplay. From this point, the game began to turn away from being a simple low-risk product to something more substantial; the camera view was moved from the traditional real-time strategy top-down perspective to the position of the general on the battlefield. As this limited the extent to which the player could see across the battlefield, this fundamentally changed the nature of the gameplay. To accompany this, the game took on a more historical approach for its units and tactics.

However, the game was not considered to be substantive enough simply with the real-time battles; Simpson recalls that "the problem [was] that the battles themselves were very short, and we needed something to tie it together and make people care about the battles". The result was the introduction of the campaign map, intended to provide the player with a broader strategic perspective and context for the battles. A feudal Japanese setting was chosen; in addition to being thought of as "cool", the Sengoku period was selected as it allowed for several different factions who could have potentially won the conflict, and due to the introduction of gunpowder to Japan, also allowed for rapid change for the game's technology tree.

To attempt to make the setting as authentic as possible, The Creative Assembly enlisted the aid of Stephen Turnbull, a military historian who specialises with samurai warfare, although the jidaigeki films by Akira Kurosawa also provided a source of inspiration—excerpts of the famous Mt. Fuji castle scene from his 1985 film Ran even feature in the opening credits to the Warlord edition of the game. Elements of Sun Tzu's The Art of War were integrated into the game's artificial intelligence to provide more authentic decisions by computer-controlled factions in the real-time aspects of the game. The game was showcased at the Electronic Entertainment Expo in both 1999 and 2000, where it garnered interest amongst the video game media. A demonstration was released in January 2000, and the game was published on 13 June 2000.

== Expansions and sequels ==
Shogun: Total War was followed by The Mongol Invasion expansion pack, set in the Mongol invasions of Japan and released only in Europe on 8 August 2001. Additional battles and a campaign were also added in the game. The player could play as either the Mongol invaders or as Japan. The Warlord Edition was also released, containing both the original game and the expansion; likewise, the Gold Edition is the same as the Warlord Edition, with minor differences in the loading screens. Warlord, for example, has an introduction movie with scenes from the Japanese film Ran which inspired the game. The Gold edition was released in a later DVD form, whereas Warlord was released in CD form. The Total War series was continued with titles mainly set around Europe, including Medieval: Total War, Rome: Total War, Medieval II: Total War, Empire: Total War and Napoleon: Total War.

In June 2010, it was confirmed that the series would return to Sengoku-era Japan, now with all of the graphical and engine improvements since the first; a direct sequel, titled Total War: Shogun 2. The game was released on 15 March 2011 and critically acclaimed, and was followed by several expansion packs set in earlier and later periods of Japanese and Samurai history.

The game was later re-released on Steam with upgraded visuals on 25 June 2015.

== Reception ==
=== Shogun: Total War ===
Shogun: Total War

Aggregate score
Aggregator	Score
Metacritic	84/100

Review scores
Publication	Score
AllGame	3.5/5
CNET Gamecenter	8/10
Computer Games Strategy Plus	4/5
Computer Gaming World	4.5/5
Edge	8/10
Eurogamer	9/10
GamePro	4.5/5
GameRevolution	B
GameSpot	8.8/10
GameSpy	90%
GameZone	9.5/10
IGN	8.5/10
Next Generation	4/5
PC Gamer (US)	84%
PC PowerPlay	86%
The Cincinnati Enquirer	3.5/4

Shogun: Total War received "favorable" reviews according to the review aggregation website Metacritic. Jason Samuel of NextGen said, "Once you figure out the realtime interface, this is a thoroughly enjoyable experience that has a lot of replay value. Shogun is only the first of a proposed Total War series. We're sure looking forward to more."

In December 2002, the game received a "Silver" award from the Entertainment and Leisure Software Publishers Association (ELSPA), indicating lifetime sales of at least 100,000 units in the UK. The ELSPA ultimately raised it to "Gold" status, indicating sales of at least 200,000 units. The game achieved sales between 100,000 and 390,000 units in the U.S. by August 2006, but was outsold by its successor Rome: Total War. The Creative Assembly's Tim Ansell later said that "it didn't set the world alight in terms of sales, but it was still up there with the big guns."

The staff of Computer Gaming World nominated the game as the best wargame of 2000, although it lost to Combat Mission: Beyond Overlord. They called the former "a dream come true for fans of medieval Japanese warfare", and wrote that "there has never been a game that so stunningly depicts historical warfare." Similarly, the game was a finalist for CNET Gamecenter's "Best Real-Time Strategy Game" award, which went to Sacrifice. The staff of Computer Games Magazine nominated the game for their 2000 "Strategy Game of the Year" award, whose winner remains unknown. The game won the award for "Best Strategy Game" at GameSpot's Best and Worst of 2000 Awards, and was nominated for the "Best Sound" award, which went to The Sims. During the 4th Annual Interactive Achievement Awards, the Academy of Interactive Arts & Sciences nominated Shogun: Total War for the "Computer Innovation" award, which ultimately went to Deus Ex.

It was nominated for a 2000 BAFTA Interactive Entertainment Award, in the category of 'Games – PC'.

=== Warlord Edition ===
Shogun: Total War Warlord Edition

Aggregate score
Aggregator	Score
Metacritic	87/100

Review scores
Publication	Score
Computer Games Magazine	4.5/5
Computer Gaming World	4.5/5
Game Informer	9/10
GameSpot	8.5/10
GameSpy	86%
GameZone	9.5/10
PC Gamer (UK)	93%

The Warlord Edition expansion pack received a bit more "favorable" reviews than the original according to Metacritic.

It was a nominee for Computer Gaming World's 2001 "Best Wargame" award, which ultimately went to Squad Battles: Vietnam. It won the award in BAFTA's Music category.

=== The Mongol Invasion ===
IGN gave The Mongol Invasion a score of 8.9 out of 10 and called it "a good expansion pack".
