= Strategic Command WWII Pacific Theater =

2008 video game

- Developer(s): Fury Software
- Publisher(s): Battlefront.com
- Platform(s): Microsoft Windows
- Release: 2008
- Genre(s): Turn-based strategy
- Mode(s): Single-player, multiplayer (by hotseat, PBEM or network)

Strategic Command WWII Pacific Theater is a grand strategy computer game developed by Canadian studio Fury Software, and published by Battlefront.com in 2008. The third game in the Strategic Command series, Pacific Theater is a turn-based strategy set in World War II, focusing – for the first time in the series – on Asia and the titular Pacific Theater. The player controls all of either Axis or Allied states.

== Gameplay ==
Like the previous installment, Blitzkrieg, Pacific Theater is a turn-based strategy taking place on a map divided into squares (or "tiles"). It is the first game in the series not focusing on the European Theater of World War II, but rather taking place in the titular Pacific Theater.

The main campaign lasts from attack on Pearl Harbor until 1947, and takes place on a map stretching from Novosibirsk and Bangalore in the west to California in the east, and from Bering Strait in the North to the southern coast of New Zealand in the south. The game also features eight "mini-campaigns", played on smaller maps, namely Battle of Midway, Kododa Trail, Philippines Campaign, Battles on Imphal and Kohima, Battle of Peleliu, Battle of Iwo Jima and Battle of Okinawa.

== Reception ==
History writer Narayan Sengupta gave the game a 7 out of 10 score in his review, praising the realism of the game and the options available in the game editor, but also criticising that the excessive length of the AI's processing during its turns as well as the number of clicks required to do certain actions. Writing for Warfare History Network, Eric T. Baker praised the variety of campaigns available in the game but criticised the lack of a zoom function in the game-map display.
