= TacOps =

1994 video game

- Developers: Major I.L. Holdridge, USMC (ret)
- Publisher: Battlefront.com
- Platforms: macOS, Windows
- Release: 1994 (macOS); 1996 (Windows)
- Genre: Turn-based wargame
- Modes: Single player, Multiplayer, PBEM

TacOps is a turn-based wargame originally released in 1994. The game, developed by Major I.L. Holdridge, USMC (ret), details modern, hypothetical combat between U.S. troops versus the OPFOR who are armed with various equipment from across the globe. Later additions added units for the Canadian, Australian and New Zealand armies, and the US Marines.

The game is noted for its encyclopedic array of modern arms and units, and the detailing of the combat.

== Gameplay ==
screenshot from the game

Instead of typical hex or square based movement, the forces move around without a grid. Players take turns giving orders and then watching the battles unfold on the map. Also, players cannot directly control where their troops fire, but rather control parameters such as fire zones, and range of engagement. The game is considered very realistic, and includes a database with information and photos for all of the units in the game.

Game play is divided into two phases. In the order phase time does not pass in the game and orders can be entered. During a combat phase these orders are executed and the player can only watch the results as 60 seconds of game time passes.

=== Order phase ===
During the order phase of a turn, when a player clicks on a unit its Order Box comes up. The player can order where the unit moves and, among other options, where it faces, whether it is exposed, and fire sector orders (with varying priorities).

=== Combat phase ===
After a player is satisfied with the orders they have given, they may move on to the combat phase. A combat phase represents 60 seconds, and is typically divided into four 15-second segments in which units fire and move.

== Reception ==
Reception

Review scores
Publication	Score
PC Gamer	90%
The Wargamer	4.5/5 (3.0)

TacOps was a runner-up for Computer Game Entertainment's 1996 "Best War Game" prize, which ultimately went to Tigers on the Prowl 2. The editors summarized TacOps as "excellent".

Games Domain said "TacOps is a solid implementation of a modern tactical wargame". In a review of version 1.04 The Wargamer wrote: "Other designers should take note and everyone even remotely interested in the subject should get it." In a review of version 3.0 they said: "Overall, I would rate this game a 4.5 out of 5 stars...THE best game on the subject period covered, without doubt."
