= Combat Mission: Black Sea =

2014 video game

- Developer: Battlefront.com
- Publisher: Battlefront.com
- Designers: Charles Moylan; Stephen Grammont
- Programmer: Charles Moylan
- Composers: Daniel Sadowski; Matt Faller
- Series: Combat Mission
- Platform: Windows Mac
- Release: NA: November 4, 2014
- Genres: Turn-based tactics, real-time tactics
- Modes: Single-player, multiplayer

Combat Mission: Black Sea is a computer wargame by American studio Battlefront.com in the Combat Mission series of games that covers a fictionalized Russian invasion of Ukraine.

== Plot ==
Since the events in Crimea and eastern Ukraine in 2014, the Ukrainian central government in Kyiv and Russia have continued to clash over the status of the disputed regions. This confrontation culminated a few years later with Ukraine's dramatic announcement that it would join NATO and the EU. Tensions exploded as Russia, perceiving a direct threat to Russian citizens, once again massed troops on the Ukrainian border, while Western governments, welcoming the possibility of NATO and EU influence expanding eastward, also mobilized. The escalation continued until the summer of 2017, when a major firefight broke out between Ukrainian and Russian forces in the Donetsk region. The next day, fighting broke out on the border, and on a dark morning in June 2017, pre-positioned Russian and NATO troops entered Ukraine.

== Overview ==
Players can command American, Ukrainian, or Russian ground forces in the environment of modern combined arms warfare. The Black Sea represents three modern armies in great detail, including the United States Army, Ukrainian Ground Forces, and Russian Ground Forces. This includes the combat formations and equipment used by infantry, armored, Stryker, motorized rifle and tank brigades.

Depending on the scenario, players can take command of forces ranging from a battalion and below in a true 3D environment.

Keeping true to the nature of modern conflict, several new features have been introduced, including electronic warfare, unmanned aerial vehicles, and laser-guided weapons. US drones can provide thermal imaging of the battlefield.

== History of development ==
During the development of the Black Sea in early 2014, a real armed conflict broke out between Russia and Ukraine. In response to this event, Battlefront announced on its website:

the storyline for Black Sea was first developed in 2009 and production started in 2013. In early 2014 Russia invaded Ukraine, making our story much less hypothetical. As a direct result we slightly modified the story's timeline to minimize contradictions with real life events. However, we deliberately made no attempt to portray an ongoing, undecided conflict. This means Black Sea is not equipped to simulate the "frozen conflict" that has since evolved in eastern Ukraine.

== Content ==
Game content included a campaign of several linked scenarios, pre-made scenarios ("battles"), and maps for the "Quick Battle" system which permitted random play in one or two player mode. Combat Mission: Black Sea features three story campaigns for all sides of the conflict:

- The Shield of Kyiv – Ukrainian motorized brigade defends on the outskirts of the capital.
- Task Force 3-69 – US troops under NATO auspices counterattack Russian vanguards near Kyiv.
- Crossing the Dnieper – Russian forces attempt to cross the Dnipro River.

The game shipped with a fully operational map and scenario editor, as well as a campaign creation tool.

== Expansions ==
An expansion, called Combat Mission: Black Sea - Battle Pack 1, was released in January 2021 on the Steam Store by Slitherine Ltd. Combat Mission: Black Sea - Battle Pack 1 can be played and ran on Windows systems, requiring Combat Mission: Black Sea to play. The Battle Pack includes two new campaigns, one for the US and one for Russia, plus six stand-alone scenarios and 27 new QuickBattle maps.

== User-created content ==
Numerous user-created scenarios, maps, and campaigns can be found at the Scenario Depot III. A wide variety of game mods can be found in the modification warehouses at thefewgoodmen.com and greenasjade.net websites.

== Reception ==
Mainstream reviews have been slow to accumulate. Opencritic.com rated the game 8/10. Rick Martin rated the game 95%. GameWatcher rated the game as 8.0, Excellent.

Wargamer wrote:

The true graphic triumph of this game lies in its presentation of the 183 units and weapon systems complete with variants. The 3D detail is incredible from the teeth of the biggest tanks' drive sprockets to the features of the much criticized M9A1 pistol. Players can almost see through the sights of a team-crewed automatic grenade launcher. American, Russian and Ukrainian vehicles are featured with the changes in variants visible. Animation further enhances the feeling of authenticity as the TOW module on a Bradley folds out or a Javelin AT rocket goes into its initial horizontal stage followed by its ballistic approach to target and its final, lethal downward plunge onto the top of some doomed AFV. Helicopters buzz around the battlefield while jets zoom in to strike if the revolving turrets of anti-aircraft vehicles don't get to them first. Individual troopers are not neglected as they run or crawl through terrain in their forest camo dress holding and firing their weapons. ... Combat Mission: Black Sea mission is deep, tense and a serious learning experience in high-tech tactical combat. No serious gamer should be without it.

== Demo ==
As has been the tradition with previous Combat Mission releases, a CM:BS demo was offered for free public download, with two playable scenarios and a tutorial mission, as well as a functioning scenario editor.
