= Naval Battles (game) =

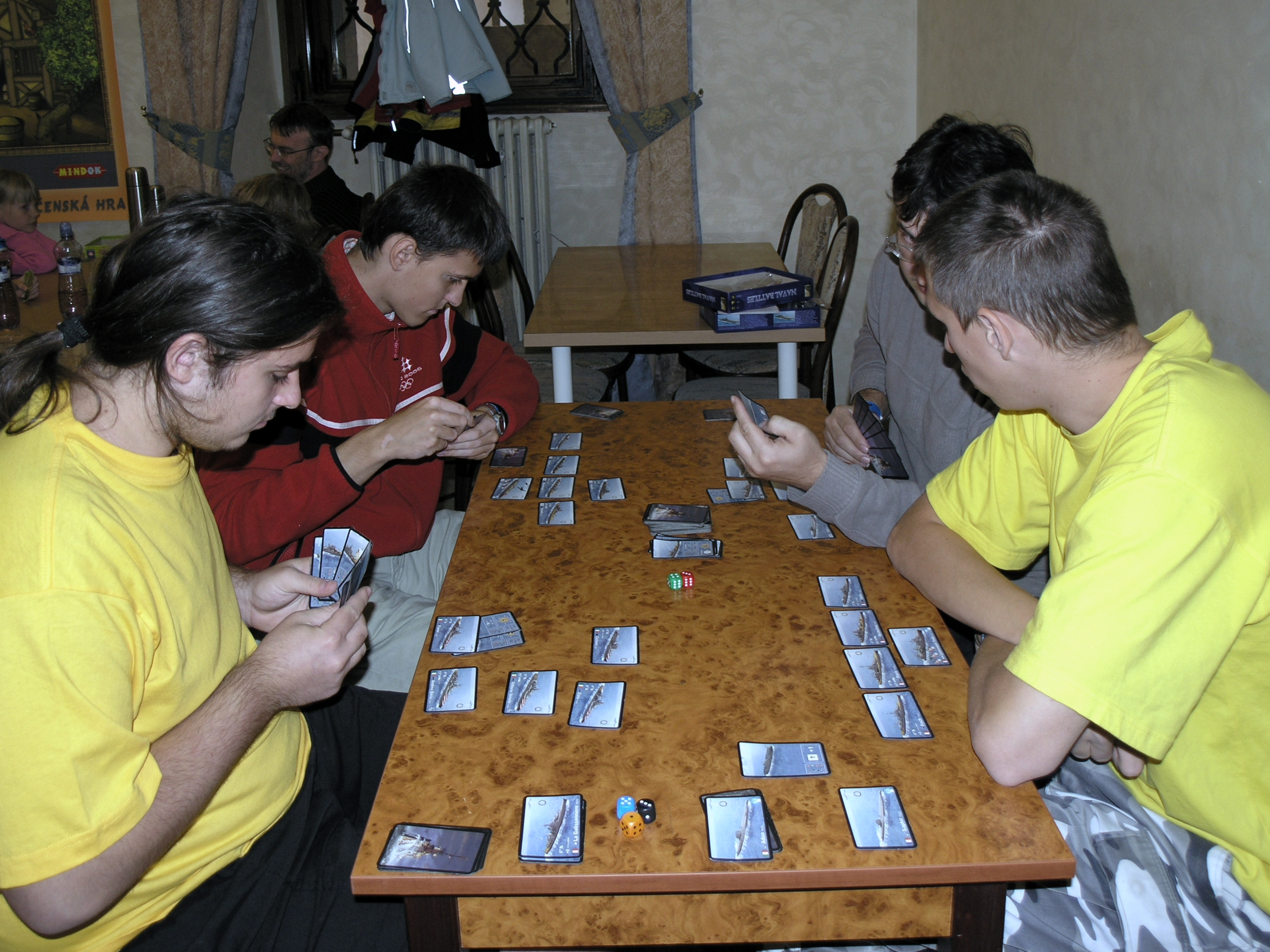
Naval Battles

Naval Battles (full title — Naval Battles: World War II on the High Seas) is a turn-based, card-driven wargame based on naval combat during World War II. Designed by Dan Verssen and published by Phalanx Games, the game is playable by 2 or more players, each commanding a fleet with the objective of sinking a certain amount of their opponents' ships.

Each player arranges an initial fleet, with each ship represented by a card. A reserve fleet is also arranged available to join the battle later as needed. Additionally, there is a deck of action cards the player draws from. In the process of their turn, a player plays cards to fire weapons and take other actions. Attack actions are usually related to a specific type of weapon mount, as detailed on the ship card. To use the attack card, the player must have a ship with the appropriate weapon mount listed. Cards may also be played by other players to defend their ships from attack.

== Ships represented ==
- France
  - Aircraft Carriers
    - Commandant Teste
  - Battleships
    - Courbet
    - France
    - Jean Bart
    - Paris
    - Richelieu
  - Cruisers
    - Colbert
    - Foch
    - La Galissonnière
    - Suffren
  - Destroyers
    - Mogador
    - Volta
  - Submarine
    - Saphir
- Germany
  - Aircraft Carrier
    - Graf Zeppelin
  - Battleships
    - Bismarck
    - Gneisenau
    - Scharnhorst
    - Tirpitz
  - Cruisers
    - Admiral Hipper
    - Prinz Eugen
  - Destroyers
    - Erich Giese
    - Schnellboot
    - T13
    - T61
  - Submarines
    - Type IXA
    - Type XXI
- Italy
  - Battleships
    - Andrea Doria
    - Conte de Cavour
    - Littorio
    - Vittorio Veneto
  - Cruisers
    - Capitani Romani
    - Fiume
    - Gorizia
    - Muzio Attendolo
    - Raimondo Montecuccoli
    - Zara
  - Destroyers
    - Aliseo
    - Ciclone
  - Submarine
    - Adua
- Japan
  - Aircraft carriers
    - Hiryū
    - Shōhō
  - Battleships
    - Nagato
    - Yamato
  - Cruisers
    - Aoba
    - Kashii
    - Kashima
    - Katori
    - Mikuma
    - Mogami
  - Destroyers
    - Kagero
    - Shimakaze
  - Submarines
    - I-174
- United Kingdom
  - Aircraft carrier
    - HMS Illustrious
  - Battleships
    - HMS Hood
    - HMS King George V
    - HMS Renown
  - Cruisers
    - HMS Dorsetshire
    - HMS Exeter
    - HMS Norfolk
    - HMS Sheffield
    - HMS Southampton
  - Destroyers
    - HMAS Nepal
    - HMAS Nestor
    - HMS Teazer
  - Submarine
    - HMS Scythian
- United States
  - Aircraft carriers
    - USS Enterprise
    - USS Sangamon
  - Battleships
    - USS Alaska
    - USS Colorado
    - USS Iowa
    - USS Pennsylvania
  - Cruisers
    - USS Brooklyn
    - USS Cleveland
    - USS Columbia
  - Destroyers
    - USS Fletcher
    - USS Jenkins
    - USS Radford
  - Submarines
    - USS Gato
