= Combat Mission 3: Afrika Korps =

2003 video game

- Developer: Battlefront.com
- Publisher: CDV Software
- Designers: Charles Moylan; Stephen Grammont
- Programmer: Charles Moylan
- Series: Combat Mission
- Platforms: Microsoft Windows, Mac
- Release: EU: November 28, 2003 (Windows); NA: December 3, 2003
- Genre: Computer wargame
- Modes: Single-player, multiplayer

In-game screenshot

Combat Mission 3: Afrika Korps is a turn-based computer wargame about tactical battles in World War II. It is part of the Combat Mission series. It focuses on the campaigns in North Africa, East Africa, Italy, and Crete.

For the Allies, the game represents the forces of Britain, America, Free France, Canada, Poland, Australia, New Zealand, and South Africa. The Axis forces include Germany and Italy.

== Demo scenarios ==
A playable public demo was offered by Battlefront.com. The demo did not include access to the mission editor, but did permit solo, hotseat, email and TCP/IP play of two included scenarios.

The first scenario depicted German armour and infantry assaulting U.S. armour and infantry over open desert and through a shallow wadi into an oasis in early 1943. The scenario highlights several new features of the CM game system, including vehicle-generated dust clouds and the modelling of multi-turreted tanks.

The second scenario depicted a U.S. assault on a German-held village in Italy in 1944.

== Reception ==
Reception

Aggregate score
Aggregator	Score
Metacritic	81/100

Review scores
Publication	Score
Computer Gaming World	3/5
GameSpot	8.4/10
GameSpy	3/5
GameZone	7.6/10
IGN	8.7/10
PC Gamer (UK)	90%
PC Gamer (US)	92%
PC Zone	75%

The game received "favorable" reviews according to the review aggregation website Metacritic.
