= Combat Mission =

- Cover art for Combat Mission Anthology collection
- Genre: Computer wargame
- Developer: Battlefront.com
- Publisher: Battlefront.com
- Platforms: Windows; Macintosh
- First release: Combat Mission: Beyond Overlord; 2000
- Latest release: Combat Mission: Cold War; 2021

Combat Mission is a series of computer wargames simulating tactical battles. The series has progressed through two distinct game engines. The original game engine, referred to as 'CMx1' by the developer, Battlefront.com, powered a trio of games set in the Second World War. Combat Mission: Shock Force was released in July 2007 as the debut of the 'CMx2' game engine. The Combat Mission games are a mixture of turn-based gameplay and simultaneous real-time execution. The game environment is fully three-dimensional, with a "Wego" style of play wherein each player enters their orders into the computer simultaneously during pauses in the action, and then are powerless to intervene during the action phase. More familiar turn-based games use an "I-go/You-go" system of play.

== History ==
Charles Moylan worked on several of Avalon Hill's computer projects, including Flight Commander 2, Achtung Spitfire, and Over the Reich. In 1997 he was unofficially working on a computer adaptation of the famous Advanced Squad Leader board game. Moylan came to realize, however, that the game would be difficult or impossible to adapt successfully to a computerized version. Atomic Games had also attempted to produce a "Computer Squad Leader" game, but abandoned the tie-in to ASL and eventually marketed the game (successfully) as Close Combat.

In the beginning of 1998 Avalon Hill was in turmoil and unstable to work for, and Moylan decided to go his own way, as Big Time Software, shortly before Avalon Hill was purchased by Hasbro. The move from Avalon Hill also meant severing ties to ASL; the unfinished project had no references to Advanced Squad Leader or Avalon Hill. Moylan briefly offered the Alpha build (tentatively called Squad Leader) to publishers before teaming up with Steve Grammont, forming what eventually became Battlefront.com and re-christening the new game Combat Mission.

Battlefront produced the first game in the Combat Mission series, Combat Mission: Beyond Overlord, in 2000. The game was successful and spawned two additional titles, as well as a second generation game engine with plans for many new titles and modules bearing the Combat Mission name. Big Time Software eventually became known as Battlefront.com, with additional members being hired, including Martin van Balkom, Dan Olding, and Fernando Julio Carrera Buil and Matt Faller, who handle the company website, graphics and sound design, and organizing beta testing of new products. Combat Mission remains the flagship series of the Battlefront.com line. In July 2010, a second programmer was hired by BFC to assist with the production of Combat Mission games.

Battlefront was acquired by strategy wargames publisher Slitherine in 2024, absorbing all Battlefront staff into the company.

== Game series ==
Combat Mission releases Combat Mission omitted from the titles
2000	Beyond Overlord
2001
2002	II: Barbarossa to Berlin
2003	3: Afrika Korps
2004
2005
2006
2007	Shock Force
2008	Shock Force - Marines
2009	Shock Force - British Forces
2010	Afghanistan
2010	Shock Force - NATO
2011	Battle for Normandy
2012	Touch
2012	Fortress Italy
2012	Battle For Normandy - Commonwealth
2013	Fortress Italy - Gustav Line
2013	Battle For Normandy - Market Garden
2014	Red Thunder
2014	Black Sea
2015
2016	Final Blitzkrieg
2017
2018
2019	Fortress Italy - Rome to Victory
2020	Shock Force 2
2020	Shock Force 2 - Marines
2020	Shock Force 2 - British Forces
2020	Shock Force 2 - NATO
2021	Red Thunder - Fire and Rubble
2021	Cold War
2022
2023
2024	Final Blitzkrieg - Downfall
2025	Cold War - British Army of the Rhine
TBA	Unspecified WW2 Title
TBA	Unspecified Modern-day title

=== CM1 Engine ===
Three titles using the original game engine were released by battlefront.com:

- Combat Mission: Beyond Overlord 2000
- Combat Mission II: Barbarossa to Berlin 2002
- Combat Mission 3: Afrika Korps 2004

These three games are commonly said to belong to the 'CMx1' engine. An operational layer was also planned for Barbarossa to Berlin with the announcement of Combat Mission: Campaign, which was to allow players to order maneuver elements from platoon to battalion size on an operational grid and generate realistic battles to be fought out in Barbarossa to Berlin. It was expected to be released in 2006; Battlefront.com had announced this title would be released before Shock Force. This game languished in development hell and was officially cancelled on February 26, 2009 due to lack of funding and irresolvable bugs.

In the meantime, production shifted to a new game engine, described as the 'CMx2' engine. New games, to consist officially of Titles, outlining a particular era, with Modules providing extra nationalities, weapons, and equipment types for each Title, were planned. The initial release was set as a near-future game.

=== CM2 Engine ===
The first release on the new engine was Combat Mission: Shock Force

This title depicts combat in a fictional US invasion of Syria, focusing on US Stryker brigades and Syrian regular and irregular forces and was released on July 27, 2007.

The CM2 engine has received several upgrades during its lifetime, known as Engine versions 1, 2,3, and 4. The earlier releases on CM2 have received retroactive upgrades to use the upgraded engine versions.

=== CM3 Engine ===
Battlefront announced in February 2025 that they had been working on a new engine CM3, based on the Unity Engine, built from the ground up. The next two games in the series that they were working on were a WW2 and a modern title, set to be released in quick succession, and using this new engine.

== Common technical details ==
Turn-based/simultaneous execution

All three games share the same concept; turns are divided into a planning and an executing phase. While the planning phase can, in single player mode, last as long as the player needs to give orders to all their units, the executing phase always lasts 60 seconds of real-time. Both sides, either computer or another human, enter their orders before the execution phase takes place. This is known as the Wego system. During the execution phase, units carry out their orders, but the player cannot influence the result and is limited to watch, replay and move the camera. All games offer to play individual battles (ranging from 15 to 60 turns, or 120 turns in Barbarossa to Berlin and Afrika Korps) or operations, linking a series of battles. See Scenarios below for more information.

Editor

The games offer an editor to create maps and battles. The editor is a simple, top-down, tile-based affair that allows mappers to place any of the game's terrain tiles anywhere on a square grid representing the map and change the elevation of each tile individually. Buildings, roads, forests, fields, rocks, and water can be placed, in addition to the forces that will be disposed to each side, if the map is designed as a scenario with fixed forces. Also, in creating custom scenarios, players can write their own text introductions to the scenario; one text file for both sides, and two other side-specific text files that set up the battle and the order of battle for each side. Players can also write their own victory/loss texts.

The series also offers a "quick battle" option. Player(s) can only edit some general parameters (mission type, year, region) and then the computer creates a random map. Units can be selected by the computer or can be bought using points. Each unit has a value in points depending on type, for example a tank costs more than a squad of riflemen. Optionally, for added realism, when buying units the rarity of the unit can be taken into account. This keeps the battles true to the time period, as players trying to use rarer units are penalized. Additionally, scenario designers often carefully research a battle to create accurate historical battles.

Multiplayer

All games offer to play as a single player versus a customizable AI, or to play against a human opponent by hot-seat, email or TCP/IP.

Scale

Game is at the squad/team level with individual vehicles and guns represented. Depending on the scenario, the players can command forces ranging from a platoon up to a reinforced battalion. Ideally, the game operates at the company level with the player taking on the role of a company commander. Given the large size of the maps in Barbarossa to Berlin and Afrika Korps, with enough computer processing power a player could deploy a brigade/regiment on a single map.

=== Game concepts ===
Morale and Leadership

Continuing the theme first presented in the Close Combat series of tactical computer wargames, Combat Mission models the morale state of soldiers in the game, with different levels ranging from OK to Routed. Fatigue levels are also modelled, and beginning in Barbarossa to Berlin soldiers are modelled with varying base levels of fitness; Fit, Weakened or Unfit. A final consideration is experience and training, which Combat Mission assigns to units ranging from Conscript to Elite.

While every unit will try to follow commands, units under fire will react to that fire by taking cover, breaking or even fleeing in panic. Units will recover from lowered morale states, though some may be permanently affected for the duration of the game. Leadership is also modelled in the game, with headquarters units influencing the morale, firepower, and stealth of units under their command.

Casualties

A hit on an enemy unit does not always mean destruction. Infantry units in the game represent from 1 to 15 soldiers, and wounded/killed men disappear from the simulation. When a unit has lost all available manpower, it will show up on the map as a dead soldier icon.

Armour penetration in Combat Mission is given realistic treatment. Partial penetrations, spalling, and non-fatal penetrating hits are all modelled in the game, with realistic ballistic stats for both armour and armour-piercing weapons. Catastrophic damage to vehicles is modelled, with real life tank models prone to fires being equally prone to "brewing up" in the game.

Scenario types

There are two types of scenarios in the first Combat Mission series; Battles and Operations. Battles are standalone scenarios, either randomly generated Quick Battles or pre-made by scenario designers. Operations are a series of two or more battles played over the same terrain, linking these fights into a greater overall context. Forces are carried over from one battle to the next in an operation, but often units will have ammunition replenishment and new units will be added to the player's army. Operations have different objectives than scenarios; sometimes winning depends on advancing to the end of the map, for example.

The second Combat Mission series will have two types of scenarios; Battles as in 'CMx1', and Campaigns, which will be story driven. Like the Operations in 'CMx1', the 'CMx2' campaigns will carry over forces from one battle to the next, but individual promotions will be possible and repair/retention of weapons is expected to be more realistically handled.

Victory

Victory is assessed by four factors; inflicting casualties, holding key terrain (when indicated by the scenario by flags), exiting units from the map (when indicated by the scenario), and capturing enemy soldiers. A computation of points is done after each scenario.

Spotting and fog of war

The player can zoom out and watch the battlefield from a bird's eye perspective as well as zoom in and attach the camera to a single unit. However, due to the games' fog of war features, the player will only see the enemy units their own units have spotted. Each unit has its own line of sight that is blocked by obstacles like hills, houses and trees. Night, dust, weather, smoke or sandstorms all reduce the line of sight.

Sometimes units can hear the enemy. That is represented with a grey symbol featuring a red question mark and the text "sound". Sound contact information tends to be less precise than visual information. Also previously spotted units may disappear again, if they hide or move out of line of sight. Long-range visual contact is not always sufficient to correctly identify an enemy unit.

Line of sight

Every unit under the player's control can be clicked and forced to display a graphical line of sight representation. The line of sight is sometimes the only way to decide if a unit can see a specific spot or not.

The first generation series of games used a concept called "absolute spotting" while the second used "relative spotting."

..."relative spotting"...is...(when) each unit knows what it has/hasn't spotted. Right now CM uses what we call "absolute spotting", which means once a unit spots something it is spotted. There is absolutely no sense of if anybody has spotted the unit before or after on a unit by unit basis.

Relative spotting is something we had wanted to get into CMBO. Unfortunately, it is more complicated thing than it might look like at first. Each unit would only be able to see/shoot at units that it was aware of. This means lots and lots of spotting calculations going on all the time even though units have already been spotted. It also means that there has to be some sort of user interface to distinguish between units spotted by other units and units spotted by the currently selected unit. If I thought back to when we realized this was too much to bite off for the first version I am sure I could remember a few other significant reasons why we didn't go with relative spotting right away

Weather and terrain

Weather and terrain is highly variable and includes different visibility (sunny, fog, precipitation, night), ground cover (mud, snow, dry ground), temperature (Not in Beyond Overlord, with extreme temperatures affecting vehicle and weapon performance) and ground type (dirt, sand, rock). Terrain is laid out in 20 metre tiles in 'CMx1' (to change to smaller tiles in 'CMx2') and includes terrain types appropriate to each individual theatre (western Europe, eastern Europe, the Mediterranean) including brush, marsh, light trees, forest, pine forest, hedges, low fences (wooden and stone), graveyards, small and large buildings, stone and wood buildings, small huts, steppe, desert, rocky ground, palm trees, cratered ground, dirt roads, paved roads, deep and shallow fords, rivers, and various types of bridges.

=== Sound and music ===
There is no background music in Combat Mission except during the title screen. The in-game sound consists of wind noise, rain, and background explosions.

Different vehicles have different engine sounds, while the troops will shout different phrases in their native languages as a cue to the player that units are moving, coming under fire, panicking, low on ammunition, surrendering, or other battlefield occurrences. Different weapon systems also have different sound effects.

=== Physics engine ===
There is a realistic physics engine in each of the games. Tanks can seek a hull-down position behind obstacles. Vehicles, being hit while moving at full speed, will sometimes continue due to momentum before coming to a halt. Tanks can push lighter vehicles out of the way. Specific details such as ground pressure are taken into effect, to the point where a heavy tank will get stuck in the mud; while a jeep will be able to drive right through the same area.

=== Unit commands and tactics ===
Depending on the type of units, each unit has a set of commands available. Movement orders are given by waypoints and varying speeds and levels of stealth can be selected. The unit will try to follow directions until the unit comes under fire or they run into a minefield. Tanks have the ability to hunt for other tanks, seeking a hull-down position behind obstacles or "scoot & shoot" by firing and then retreating to a pre-selected hiding spot. Infantry units can all hide, sneak and move. Most units can run for a while, and many units like rifle squads can "advance" or "assault" which simulates the use of fire and movement at the squad level, with some men firing from cover while others advance in short bursts of movement. Soviet units can launch human wave attacks. It is possible to fire at spotted enemies but also give Area Fire commands.

While units can be ordered to perform certain specific actions (assault, fire, move, hide, etc.) actual unit tactics, in the sense of manoeuvring, occupying an objective or laying an ambush are entirely dictated by the player. Units under human command will not move (other than fleeing when broken or shaken) unless specifically ordered to do so. They will fire back if fired upon and tanks will pop smoke and often retreat a short distance if they register the targeting laser of a hostile MBT or other heavy vehicle.

In the World War 2 series of games Infantry squads (particularly the Americans) can be broken down into 3 teams. In the modern Combat Mission games (Shock Force and Black Sea) Infantry squads can only be broken into a maximum of two teams within a particular category - Scout, Assault, Split and Anti-tank. Each of these categories creates a team of that specific type using the appropriate soldiers. The remaining unit members are bundled into the second team.

For example, selecting Scout will create a two-man Scout (Team 1) while placing everyone else into Team 2.

Armoured units do not break down into separate teams, the individual vehicles being considered as separate entities.

=== Realism ===
The game engine handles various aspects of the battlefield differently; ranging from very detailed (like tank armor) to very abstract (like infantry movement). The two game engine variants, 'CMx1' and 'CMx2' also have significant differences in processing capability, ability to handle large numbers of units or complex models/maps and iterative AI complexity, with CMx2 being a much more robust, stable and flexible development of the core game engine.

- Infantry in the first series of games (which use the 'CMx1' engine) is handled more simply than other parts of the game: A squad of 12 men is displayed as 3 soldiers and a numeric value displaying 12 in the status bar if you click on the unit. A two-man bazooka crew is displayed as a single soldier and a value displaying two in the status bar. However large a squad in manpower is, it will always face and move as a single unit. Large infantry units can be split into smaller, less effective units with a corresponding loss in morale.

The 'CMx2' engine, used in Combat Mission: Shock Force and onwards, provides a much more detailed treatment of Infantry. Individual soldiers are modelled, animated and tracked, along with their own individual AI within the game. So a platoon of 8 infantry contains 8 individual soldiers which are treated as separate entities united by a common unit AI, but with their own set of characteristics, including even their name.

For example, the real-time Morale status of each soldier is tracked, although it is their current unit (squad, team, platoon, etc.) as a whole which will break or rally. Each soldier will scan, aim, fire, throw grenades, reload, cower as individuals while operating as part of their unit. If their platoon is ordered to move every soldier will attempt to do so but will still react to events around them, such as suppressive fire, artillery explosions, mines, etc.

- Some aspects are simplified for clarity and to avoid overloading the engine with too much detail. Experience, motivation and fitness are measured on a per unit scale, with the smallest being a team (such as a machine gunner and assistant, or a sniper duo) or an individual tank or IFV. These soft factors can be manually adjusted from the battalion level down to the individual teams or vehicle - so a mechanized infantry company could have a collective Veteran experience level, but 1st Platoon is given Regular experience, while its 1st Squad could be put as Conscript.
- Terrain is handled in 20 metre tiles. While you see a group of trees in the battle graphic, you can turn the (visualization of the) trees completely off and be left with a dark-green area of the ground instead. This area has a value for providing cover, providing camouflage and hindering movement. The value always acts for the complete square, not for a single tree. Elevation is handled correctly, making it possible to seek cover behind slopes or dominate a battlefield by controlling high ground. Alternatively, reverse slope defence tactics can also be quite effective, as they were in real life.
- Airplanes cannot be controlled nor seen at all. Depending on the scenario description, airplanes will participate in the combat. All you will see is the fast moving shadow of the plane on the ground. Airplanes can be destroyed, however, (you will see tracers of machine gun and anti-aircraft fire streaming upwards) and in return shoot (with varying accuracy) with their guns, bombs and rockets.
- Indirect firing heavy artillery is mostly stationed off-screen and represented by a single artillery observer. If he has line of sight to a target, he can order very accurate shelling of the target area. However, target patterns are predictably oriented to the map edges. Barbarossa to Berlin introduced the idea of pre-registered barrages which can be called down immediately on the first turn of the game with no chance of error, representing pre-planned artillery missions rather than "on-call."

Combat Mission: Black Sea introduced the use of UAVs. Some models, notably those used by the US forces, can be used to identify targets beyond the operating unit's Line of Sight, allowing indirect fire support and CAS missions to be called in.

- Mortars and direct firing guns are presented in great detail.
- Tanks and all kinds of vehicles are modeled in great detail, with accurate researched values for speed, number of weapons, cannon range & angles, turret speed, and armor penetration angles / armor plates quality protecting different parts of a vehicle. Different ammunition types with different armor penetration values are present.
- Historical details like uniforms and availability of troop types and quality is very detailed and generally well researched with particular attention paid to German order of battle information. Any size unit from a platoon to a battalion may be used in the game, but specifics of weapons and manpower are non user-definable. However, extensive research into different troop and unit types gives a wide array of unit types. For example, while a player cannot define how many men or LMGs a squad of Germans will have, he can nonetheless select units from different branches (Luftwaffe, Waffen SS, Army, Volksgrenadiers) and types (Mechanized, Airborne, Infantry, Security, etc.), all of which have standardized but historically researched strengths and equipment.

== Games ==
Games in the Combat Mission series
Title	Year	Developer	Publisher	Expansions	Year
CMx1 game engine
Combat Mission: Beyond Overlord	2000	Big Time Software	CDV Software		
Combat Mission II: Barbarossa to Berlin	2002	Battlefront.com	CDV Software		
Combat Mission 3: Afrika Korps	2003	Battlefront.com	CDV Software		
CMx2 game engine
Combat Mission: Shock Force	2007	Battlefront.com	Paradox Interactive	Marines	2008
Combat Mission: Shock Force	2007	Battlefront.com	Paradox Interactive	British Forces	2009
Combat Mission: Shock Force	2007	Battlefront.com	Paradox Interactive	NATO	2010
Combat Mission: Campaigns	2009 (Cancelled)	Hunting Tank Software	Battlefront.com		
Combat Mission: Afghanistan	2010	Snowball Studios	Battlefront.com		
Combat Mission: Battle for Normandy	2011	Battlefront.com	Battlefront.com	Commonwealth Forces	2012
Combat Mission: Battle for Normandy	2011	Battlefront.com	Battlefront.com	Market Garden	2013
Combat Mission: Touch	2012	Dromedary, LLC, Battlefront.com	Battlefront.com		
Combat Mission : Fortress Italy	2012	Battlefront.com	Battlefront.com	Gustav Line	2013
Combat Mission : Fortress Italy	2012	Battlefront.com	Battlefront.com	Rome to Victory	2019
Combat Mission: Red Thunder	2014	Battlefront.com	Battlefront.com	Fire and Rubble	2021
Combat Mission: Black Sea	2014	Battlefront.com	Battlefront.com		
Combat Mission: Final Blitzkrieg	2016	Battlefront.com	Battlefront.com	Downfall	2024
Combat Mission: Shock Force 2	2020	Battlefront.com	Battlefront.com	Marines	2020
Combat Mission: Shock Force 2	2020	Battlefront.com	Battlefront.com	British Forces	2020
Combat Mission: Shock Force 2	2020	Battlefront.com	Battlefront.com	Nato	2020
Combat Mission: Cold War	2021	Battlefront.com	Battlefront.com	British Army Of the Rhine	2025
CMx3 game engine
Unspecified WW2 Title	TBA	Battlefront.com	Matrix Games		
Unspecified Modern-day Title	TBA	Battlefront.com	Matrix Games		

=== CMX1 game engine ===
==== Combat Mission: Beyond Overlord ====
Combat Mission: Beyond Overlord covers the western front of the European theatre from June 1944 to May 1945. Being the first incarnation of the Combat Mission series, the graphics appear the most dated. Explosions and the firing of guns are displayed with white ellipses, and every shell shows as a yellow blob. Nationalities included in the game are German, British, Canadian, Free French, American and Polish.

==== Combat Mission II: Barbarossa to Berlin ====
Covers the Eastern Front of the Second World War, including fighting in Finland, the Soviet Union, Germany, Romania, Hungary, Yugoslavia, Berlin and the Baltic States from June 1941 to May 1945. Barbarossa to Berlin shows various improvements over its predecessor in the fields of graphics and user interface. Infantry units have new commands available and explosions are now bitmaps. Interface is more sophisticated; commands like "crawl" and "sneak" from Beyond Overlord are now transformed into a single "sneak" command. The old "ambush marker" is replaced with a more elegant solution: "covered arc" and "covered arc (armor only)". By clicking this command you can define a field of fire so that units will fire only when enemy targets of a certain type come within a certain range or arc of fire.

The artillery is modeled in a slightly more sophisticated way (allowing precise fire plans) and infantry sprites look a bit better. Tanks have a "shoot and scoot" command, letting the player define a fire position and a retreat position for his tanks. Barbarossa to Berlin is the only game in the series that allows the player to fight in big factories and use sewers. Nationalities included are German, Italian, Soviet, Hungarian, Romanian (both as Allies and Axis), Finnish, Polish and non-nation specific Partisans.

Barbarossa to Berlin, two anti-tank guns aiming at a Soviet tank

==== Combat Mission 3: Afrika Korps ====
Covering battles in North Africa, Italy and Crete, this last incarnation of the CM series using the original game engine, features much improved graphics over Beyond Overlord. Included are 3D models with many more polygons, and subtler effects such as dust clouds. Multi-turret vehicles are introduced though weapons in separate weapon mounts still cannot target separately. Included nationalities are British, American, German, Italian, Canadian, Polish, Australian, New Zealand, French and South African, with dates ranging from late 1940 to May 1945. Afrika Korps can also be used to play Western Front battles (i.e. Beyond Overlord battles) with the newest graphics and updated order menu, but without the full range of vehicles, as some German tanks (such as the King Tiger) were not used in Africa or Italy. The scenarios for CMBO have to be recreated in CMAK using the Editor. There is no import/export feature.

Afrika Korps, line of sight

=== CMX2 game engine ===
The second generation game engine debuted in 2007, including three different games: Shock Force, Afghanistan, and Battle for Normandy. In June 2012, the CMX2 2.0 game engine was announced, which was to debut with another new game called Fortress Italy.

==== Combat Mission: Shock Force ====
Covers Battles between US Stryker Brigades and Syrian forces in the year 2007. The first incarnation of the CM series using the new CMx2 game engine, Shock Force features improved graphics and 3D modelling, including such esoterica as sun and star positions in the sky. Modelling of infantry offers a 1:1 representation (every single soldier is depicted in the 3D world by its own animated graphic). The game was released on July 27, 2007. The game was patched to 1.01 status shortly after release and as of January 2009 had eleven official patches, with more announced.

Three Modules were also released:

- Combat Mission: Shock Force Marines
- Combat Mission: Shock Force British Forces
- Combat Mission: Shock Force NATO

==== Combat Mission: Afghanistan ====
Russian software developer Snowball made a surprise announcement that they were developing a game under license using the CMx2 game engine, with certain refinements and additions, in order to portray tactical combat during the Soviet war in Afghanistan during 1979-1989. Battlefront confirmed the news on their official website and posted screenshots of some of the work in progress, confirming that playable units would include Lee–Enfield-armed mujahadeen, BMP personnel carriers, and other authentic military equipment emblematic of the era.

==== Combat Mission: Campaigns ====
Campaigns was announced in October 2005; later discussion revealed that work had already been progressing on the game for many years behind the scenes by independent developer Hunting Tank Software. The game was intended to allow players of Barbarossa to Berlin the ability to create battles in an operational (division sized) setting. No release date was set as the game continued development and testing. Announced campaign settings included the Battle of Kursk, Stalingrad, Berlin, Third Battle of Kharkov and Operation Mars. Only Russian and German nationalities were to be playable in the initial release. The game was eventually cancelled in February 2009. Major setbacks had included the defection of one of the coders of the project and the need to replace him.

==== Combat Mission: Battle for Normandy ====
In December 2010, Battlefront confirmed the title of the next major release in the series. The game takes place, as had been discussed for years on the official forums, in Normandy. The official title Battle for Normandy was announced on December 23, 2010. A public demo was released on May 11, 2011 and the full game was available for download to pre-order customers on May 18, 2011. The game was upgraded to the 2.0 game engine in December 2012. As of 2015, an optional upgrade is available to bring Battle for Normandy up to the most-recent version of the CMx2 engine (3.0).

In December 2011 the first module was announced:

- Combat Mission: Battle for Normandy Commonwealth Forces

==== Combat Mission: Touch ====
Combat Mission: Touch was announced on 1 April 2012, as an app for iPad 2 and iPad 3. The game initially debuted online in the Australian region on 1 April, followed a day later by a North American release. The game was developed in partnership with Dromedary, LLC as scaled down version of the popular PC-based series. The application features American vs. German forces in 7 Normandy-based scenarios. BFC announced a micro-transaction based revenue model centred around the sale of additional scenarios (unlike the PC game, CM: Touch does not include map or mission editors). The game was described by one reviewer as "(a) niche WWII RTS, low in polygon count and high in challenge."

==== Combat Mission: Fortress Italy ====
Combat Mission: Fortress Italy was released on 2 August 2012. This was the first title to use the CMX2 2.0 game engine. The first title of a new "family" of games set in the Campaign, the base game includes U.S. Army, Italian Army and Luftwaffe (Hermann Göring Division) forces. The game has received mixed reviews. As of 2015, an optional upgrade is available to bring Fortress Italy up to the most-recent version of the CMx2 engine (3.0).

==== Combat Mission: Red Thunder ====
Combat Mission: Red Thunder was released on 04 Apr 2014. It focuses on the Russian Offensive, Operation Bagration, that was launched in June, 1944, shortly after D-Day in the west. Several new features are implemented, such as improved modeling of air support, flamethrowers, riders on tanks, hit decals, and support for turn-based play over TCP/IP networks. Red Thunder also debuted the newest version (3.0) of the CMx2 engine.

==== Combat Mission: Black Sea ====
Combat Mission: Black Sea was released on 04 Nov 2014. Battlefront's first modern-day Combat Mission title since Shock Force, Black Sea focuses on a hypothetical war between NATO and Russia over Ukraine in the year 2017 (Note: Combat Mission Black Sea was made 4 years before the Russian invasion of Ukraine, but follows similar doctrine used in the initial invasion.). Keeping true to the nature of modern conflict, several new features have been introduced, including electronic warfare, unmanned aerial vehicles, and laser-guided weapons.

==== Combat Mission: Final Blitzkrieg ====
Combat Mission: Final Blitzkrieg was released on 8 April 2016. The game features U.S., German Army, Waffen-SS and Luftwaffe troops in the Netherlands, France, Germany and the Ardennes in the period 1 October 1944 - January 31, 1945.

==== Combat Mission: Shock Force 2 ====
Combat Mission: Shock Force 2 (CM:SF2) released on August 31, 2020. The game updates the original Shock Force to the current Game Engine 4, dramatically improving on the original game's graphics, 3D models, environmental features, UI, UX, AI scripting and Game Editor. It also adds additional game features developed for Black Sea and Final Blitzkrieg.

Modules: CM:SF2 saw the re-release of all three modules from the original Shock Force (Marines, British Forces and NATO) with most of the 3D models rebuilt, reskinned, and reintegrated into brand new TO&E coding. All original scenarios and campaign games (from the base game and additional modules) are included, updated and generally improved to Game Engine 4 level.

Shock Force 2 stays within the previous Shock Force's fictional 2008 timeframe and storyline and does not extend that story and strategic context beyond the hypothetical 2008 situation. (Note: Syrian Civil War: Combat Mission: Shock Force 2 does not feature, describe or allude to the former civil war in Syria. It simply updates and upgrades Shock Force's in-game content, mechanics and game features to Game Engine 4. The original game was released 4 years before the Syrian Civil War began. CM:SF2 does not simulate the post-2011 Syrian civil war in any way whatsoever.)

Upgrades: Battlefront.com provided players who had the original Shock Force with inexpensive upgrades, as a show of appreciation.

==== Combat Mission: Cold War ====
Combat Mission: Cold War was released on 16 November 2021. The game features a fictional war between NATO and Soviet Warsaw Pact, between 1979 and 1982. An expansion, entitled British Army of the Rhine was announced in 2023, slated to be the last release on the CM2 engine. The DLC released on 25th September 2025.

== User created content ==
The Combat Mission community is very active in creating scenarios and game modifications. One of the biggest repositories of user created content as well as some popular forums can be found at thefewgoodmen.com. More forums can be found on Battlefront's official website. Arguably the largest content creator for the series on YouTube is Usually Hapless.
