= Achtung Spitfire! =

1997 video game

- Developer: Big Time Software
- Publisher: Avalon Hill
- Designer: Charles Moylan
- Artist: Steven Holmes
- Composer: Charles Moylan
- Platforms: Windows 95, Mac OS
- Release: NA: September 3, 1997
- Genre: Computer wargame
- Modes: Single-player, multiplayer

Achtung Spitfire! is a 1997 computer wargame developed by Big Time Software and published by Avalon Hill. It is a turn-based air combat game taking place during the early half of World War II, including fixed-wing aircraft, air battles and operations by Luftwaffe, Royal Air Force and French Air Force in 1939–1943.

Achtung Spitfire! is a prequel to the 1996 computer wargame Over the Reich, which takes place during the latter half of the war. Another game in the series, Third Reich PC, was also released in 1996. Rather than being designed for serious flight simulation experts, Achtung Spitfire! is catered around the interests of all World War II hobbyists.

== Gameplay ==
As a pilot in the French Air Force, the player is trying to fight some Luftwaffe pilots.

Players must command a series of pilots as they try to achieve the goals of the current mission. Technological changes over the years of the war result in faster and better planes to fly in. After choosing the pilots, players must defend their own allies, combat enemy fighters and/or bombers, or undertake an interception mission vital to the war effort. The game uses the same flight engine and graphic user interface as Over the Reich, granting the same amount of limited autonomy in every game. Players must watch their speed, torque and altitude. Otherwise, they could stall or simply crash into the ground.

Many of the flying techniques found in the actual World War II cannot be recreated in this game due to in-game limitations. Players cannot do cover fire techniques and are unable to advance fire towards the enemy. The entire game stops at 1943, which is between the Battle of Britain and the Invasion of Normandy. Scenarios can be quickly generated in a method similar to Jane's Advanced Tactical Fighters.

There is a mini-encyclopedia containing vital information about 25 of the aircraft used in this game. Multiplayer gameplay is possible either through either Internet or play by e-mail.

Squadrons which survive until 1943 can be transferred to Over the Reich.

== Development ==
Achtung Spitfire! was developed by Big Time Software and published by Avalon Hill. It was designed by Big Time's Charles Moylan, who had previously created Flight Commander 2 and Over the Reich for Avalon.

== Reception ==
Reception

Review scores
Publication	Score
AllGame	4/5
Computer Games Strategy Plus	4.5/5
Computer Gaming World	5/5
GameSpot	7.8/10
MacLife	(Mac) "Y.W."
Next Generation	(Mac) 3/5
PC Gamer (US)	85%
PC PowerPlay	80%

The game received favorable reviews. Critics widely agreed that the game is accessible and easy to play, yet offers a rich spectrum of challenges and strategic possibilities. GameSpot particularly noted the graduated skill system, saying this solves a common problem of wargames by allowing the player the option of gradually easing themselves into the game's mechanics. The large number of available scenarios was also praised, though Computer Games Strategy Plus felt the Battle of Britain campaign to be the highlight. The reviewer called Achtung Spitfire! "a very rich wargame, one in which the player's decisions have an immediate and dramatic effect on the outcome." Next Generation said that the Mac version "isn't breaking new ground, but it is a solid and entertaining game, and a thoughtful diversion from the usually frenetic nature of computer games."

The game sold fewer than 50,000 units globally. This was part of a trend for Avalon Hill games during the period; Terry Coleman of Computer Gaming World wrote in late 1998 that "no AH game in the past five years" had reached the mark.

The game was a runner-up for Computer Gaming World's 1997 "Wargame Game of the Year" award, which ultimately went to Sid Meier's Gettysburg! The staff called the former "simply the best Battle of Britain game ever."
