= Tank Commander (video game) =

1995 video game

- Developer: Big Red Software
- Publisher: Domark
- Platform: MS-DOS
- Release: April 1995
- Genre: Vehicle simulation
- Modes: Single-player, multiplayer

Tank Commander is a tank simulation video game developed by Big Red Software and published by Domark for MS-DOS in 1995. It allows play via modem as well as network.

== Development ==
Tank Commander was developed by UK studio Big Red Software for publisher Domark. In 1993, the two companies had formed a partnership after Big Red cut ties with Codemasters and shifted focus from console games to PC games. Tank Commander was Big Red's most expensive project to date, costing £80,000. The developer's Paul Ranson stated that the team never intended the game to be a hyper realistic simulation like those of MicroProse, wanting instead to essentially "write a version of Battlezone for the 90s" with a focus on action while still containing strategic undertones. Ranson elaborated that they wished to add excitement to the typically "boring" nature of real-life tank warfare by including an array of exotic weaponry not normally associated with the vehicle. 3D assets including soldiers were also made larger relative to the tank to give them more detail. For the basis of its tank graphics, Big Red received technical assistance from British engineering firm Vickers, the manufacturer of the Challenger 1 tank. However, artists were prohibited from looking inside the Challenger, so the game's designs were mostly fabricated.

Big Red was simultaneously working with very early 3D computer graphics cards from Yamaha and a variety of virtual reality headsets. The first consumer iterations of these headsets were tested using Tank Commander. The game was released in April 1995. Big Red was purchased by Domark shortly thereafter. Domark itself was purchased by the larger Eidos Interactive which commissioned a sequel to Tank Commander, but it was ultimately cancelled.

== Reception ==
Reception

Review scores
Publication	Score
Computer Game Review	76/100
Computer Gaming World	2.5/5
Hyper	72%
Next Generation	2/5
PC Gamer (US)	69%
PC Zone	60/100
Dimension-3	88%
Gambler	85%
Génération 4	76%
Joystick	175/200
MikroBitti	65/100
PC Games	68%
PC Joker	72%
PC Player	64/100
Pelit	60/100
Play Time	65%
Power Play	73%
Power Unlimited	74/100
Secret Service	88%
Score	77%

Next Generation gave the game two stars out of five; although positively commenting game's visuals, the magazine considered the title as inferior to MicroProse's M1 Tank Platoon. Ted Chapman of Computer Game Review dubbed it "fiendishly addictive".
