= Strategic Command WWII Global Conflict =

2010 video game

- Developer(s): Fury Software
- Publisher(s): Battlefront.com
- Platform(s): Windows
- Release: 5 March 2010
- Genre(s): Turn-based strategy
- Mode(s): Single-player, multiplayer

Strategic Command WWII Global Conflict is a grand strategy computer game developed by Fury Software, and published by Battlefront.com. The game was released on 5 March 2010. It is the fourth title in the Strategic Command series. As the previous installments, it is a turn-based strategy set in World War II. For the first time, the main campaigns don't focus on a particular theater of war. Instead, the game features a map of the whole world. The player controls all of either Axis or Allied states.

== Reception ==
Reviewing the game in April 2010 for Armchair General, Steven M. Smith gave the game 95% stating that "this is the best grand strategy game I have ever played". Gamercast gave the game a positive 4 out of five stars review, praising the compelling gameplay and editor, but criticising the lack of a "skip turn" button. French-language Gazette du Wargamer magazine praised the fun and short nature of the game, as well as the fact that even modest computers could run it and the availability of the editor, but also criticised the limited diplomatic options and the cost of the game, as well as Battlefront's digital rights management system.
