= Down in Flames (video game) =

2005 video game

- Developer: Dan Verssen Games
- Publisher: Battlefront.com
- Designers: Dan Verssen (designer); Brian Marrs (programmer); Oleg Pomoshnikov (main model maker)
- Platform: Microsoft Windows
- Release: WW: 28 September 2005; Eastern Front: NA: October 2006
- Genre: Turn-based strategy
- Modes: Single-player, multiplayer

Down in Flames is a computer video game for Microsoft Windows, developed by American studio Dan Verssen Games and published by Battlefront.com in 2005. Closely based on a card-driven tabletop game of the same name, Down in Flames is a turn-based simulation of dogfights between World War II fighter planes. Some parts of the game also involve escorting and intercepting bombers.

The game features aircraft of Germany, Japan, the United Kingdom and the United States. An expansion pack, Eastern Front, was released in 2006, adding Polish and Soviet planes.

== Gameplay ==
Down in Flames is closely based on a dedicated deck card game of the same name, first released in 1993 by GMT Games. It is a turn-based simulation of dogfights between World War II fighter planes. Such battles are combined into campaigns. In a single dogfight, each player controls either one or two pairs of fighters, with each pair consisting of a leader and a wingman.

At the start of each battle, the players are dealt a hand of cards. Each card represents a certain action, such as an offensive or defensive maneuver, machine gun burst or altitude change. Both sides play chosen cards in a turn-based manner responding to enemy's maneuvers, until one side is defeated. The game uses an "Action/Reaction system" with "action" cards used to initiate maneuvers, while "reaction" cards are used to cancel and react to enemy's moves. Some cards are both actions and reactions.

Apart from dogfights, one side also attempts to attack targets on the ground (such as troops, naval units or factories) while the other side defends them. Some missions also include escorting or intercepting bombers, but the bomber planes itself are not controlled by the player.

The game features aircraft of Germany, Japan, the United Kingdom and the United States. Each fighter is described by four ratings: performance (number of maneuvers its pilot can have at any one time), horsepower (number of new maneuvers the aircraft gains each turn), bursts (how much firepower the plane has) and airframe (how much damage the plane can take before being shot down). Pilots gain experience with each dogfight (although they may be "permanently killed" in online multiplayer mode) and eventually new planes can be unlocked. During the game, the player may buy extra cards and abilities, a feature not found in the original card game.

== Expansion pack ==
An expansion pack, titled Down in Flames: Eastern Front, was released in 2006. It adds Polish and Soviet planes to the game, as well as three new planes for each of the countries previously featured in the game. The expansion also adds new campaigns, pilot skills and the option to create custom missions.

== Development ==
Development started in 2002, when Dan Verssen - creator of the original tabletop version of Down in Flames – met Brian Marrs, a professional programmer who created a self-made computer rendition of the game. Verssen thought it had "commercial possibilities" and in November 2002, together with Marrs started working on "polishing" the game.

In the spring of 2003, Verssen and Marrs tried to find a publisher on E3, an annual trade show for computer and video games. When none of the companies displayed interest, Verssen decided to look for a publisher on the Internet, and came in contact with Battlefront.com, which after additional work on the game, eventually published Down in Flames in 2005.

== Campaigns ==
Following campaigns are included in the game:

- Dunkirk – Dunkirk evacuation (1940)
- Battle of Britain – the Battle of Britain (1940)
- Singapore – the Battle of Singapore (1941–1942)
- Midway – the Battle of Midway (1942)
- Solomon Islands – Solomon Islands campaign (1942–1943)
- Daylight 1944 – Allied bombings of the Third Reich (1944)

Additional campaigns, available as free of charge downloadable content:

- Bomber Command 1941 – overview of bombing and oceanic operations by the British and German air forces and navies (1941).
- Battle for Greece – Operation Marita (1941)
- Invasion of Crete – the Battle of Crete (1941)
- Malta – the Siege of Malta (1941)
- Flying Tigers – campaign following the history of the 1st American Volunteer Group (1941–1942).
- Leyte Gulf – the Battle of Leyte Gulf (1944)

=== Expansion pack ===
Following campaigns are featured in the expansion pack:

- Strange War – Soviet-Japanese Border Wars (1939)
- Gdansk Bay – the Battle of the Danzig Bay (1939)
- Last Defence – final phase of the September Campaign (1939)
- Red Tide First Strike – Soviet bombing of Stettin and Berlin (1941).
- Leningrad 1942 – Siege of Leningrad, with advantage on the German side (1942).
- Leningrad 1943 – German-Soviet battle with both sides having similar power (1943).
- Leningrad 1944 – third Leningrad campaign in the game, with Soviet advantage (1944).
- D-Day – Allied landing in Normandy (1944)
- The Rock – the Battle of Okinawa (1945)
- Iwo – the Battle of Iwo Jima (1945)
- August Storm – Soviet invasion of Manchuria (1945)
- Invasion Japan – Operation Downfall, a hypotethical Allied invasion of Japan (1945).
- Invasion USA – a fictional conflict fought on American soil between the US and Germany, with German planes operating from Nazi-occupied Florida. (1945)

== Reception ==
Reception

Aggregate score
Aggregator	Score
Metacritic	75/100

Review scores
Publication	Score
Computer Gaming World	4.5/5
GameSpy	4/5

Down in Flames received "generally favorable reviews" according to the review aggregation website Metacritic. The Gamers' Temple described the game as "Magic: The Gathering for the wargamer" and concluded that it will "appeal to wargamers looking for a quick playing, light strategy game". Computer Gaming World said that Down in Flames emphasizes ease of play over its realism. GameSpy described the game as "wickedly addictive", but complained on the lack of Soviet planes in the base version.
