= Iron Warriors: T-72 Tank Commander =

2004 video game

T-72: Balkans On Fire!
- Cover art of Russian version
- Developer(s): Crazy House
- Publisher(s): Battlefront.com; Strategy First
- Designer(s): IDDK/Crazy House
- Platform(s): Windows
- Release: September, 2004
- Genre(s): Vehicle simulation game
- Mode(s): Single player, Multiplayer

Iron Warriors: T-72 Tank Command, known as T-72: Balkans on Fire! (Russian: Т-72: Балканы в огне) in Europe, is a tank-driving simulation by Russian game developers IDDK/Crazy House and published by Battlefront.com.

== Summary ==
The game is set during the Yugoslav wars of 1991–1995. The player is a Russian volunteer tank commander who is there to aid the Serbs. The player can use the T-72B (Ob'yekt 184), the T-55A (Ob'yekt 137G) and the T-34-85. The game has realistic physics, including the tank engine's complexity being simulated as well. The player can switch between the different tank positions, such as the driver, the gunner, the machine-gunner, and the commander.

Several players can play in multiplayer mode and occupy different stations in the same tank.
