= Strategic Command (video game series) =

- The title graphic for the 2019 Strategic Command: Complete bundle
- Genre: turn-based strategy
- Developer: Fury Software/ Battlefront.com
- Publisher: Excalibur Publishing
- Creator: Hubert Cater
- First release: Strategic Command: European Theater; 2002
- Latest release: Strategic Command: American Civil War; 2023

Strategic Command is a series of computer video games developed by Fury Software and Battlefront.com, and published by Excalibur Publishing. Since the premiere of the first game in the series, Strategic Command: European Theater in 2002, eight further new titles and six expansion packs have been released, with the ninth game released in 2022, Strategic Command: American Civil War, being the most recent one. Including re-releases, expansions, and the 2019 bundle Strategic Command: Complete, 22 different titles are included in the series.

Strategic Command games are turn-based strategies set in World War I, World War II and the American Civil War, as well as other minor conflicts. The first games of each new generation of the series (i.e., European Theater, Blitzkrieg, and War in Europe) took place in the European Theatre of World War II. Two games have been released focusing on the entire global conflict of WW2 (Global Conflict and World at War). Two games have also been released focusing on the World War I (The Great War 1914-1918 and World War I). One-off games have been released focusing on the Pacific Theatre of WW2 and the American civil war.

Three different game engines have been created for different generations of Strategic Command. The first title featured a hex map. In the second generation of the series, the games are played on maps divided into squares ("tiles"). The third game-engine saw the return of hexes. Games from the first and second series saw the player assuming control over either Axis, Central Powers or Allied, Entente Cordiale states of World War II and World War I. The Patton Drives East expansion in the second series added a conflict between the Western Allies and the Soviet Union. The third series repeated the WW1 and WW2 focus of the preceding games and added a game focused on the American Civil War.

== Common elements ==
Strategic Command games are all turn-based strategies. With the exception of the Patton Drives East expansion pack of Strategic Command 2, which also features post-1945 campaigns and scenarios, and Strategic Command: American Civil War, all the games are set during the first and second world wars. In campaigns, the player can controls all of the states on one side of the conflict (e.g., the Axis or Allied states for games set in the second world war). The most important part of the game is commanding the military units, but the player also controls the research of technologies and diplomatic relations. Neutral states may join the war in certain circumstances (for example, in European Theater, Spain may become an Axis state, if other Axis powers first manage to defeat the United Kingdom), or when one side directly declares a war against them.

Apart from campaigns – in which the game takes place on a whole theatre of war – Strategic Command series also feature scenarios taking place on smaller maps, and portraying only single events, such as Operation Market Garden or the 1974 war on Cyprus.

Since Strategic Command 2, weather and diplomatic pressure are modeled in the games. Using diplomatic pressure, the player may eventually persuade a neutral country to either join the war on his side, or to prevent it from becoming his enemy.

== AI ==
The AI (artificial intelligence) for the first game engine, that of European Theater, the AI was hard coded with a few targets which it would attack or defend depending on circumstances. As such it was not capable to adapting to different maps, but only the targets present on the map of Europe provided in European Theater. For the second game engine, that of Blitzkrieg, the AI was updated to be capable of adapting to differing maps. This was achieved by dividing the AI into three layers: a first layer that measured the strengths and weaknesses of opposing forces on the map in differing regions, a second layer that determined whether a defensive or offensive posture was appropriate for each region based on the output of the first layer, and a third layer where a campaign-dependent script was used to give the AI a campaign-specific focus.

== Games ==
Titles in the series
Game	Year released	Game engine	Type
Strategic Command: European Theatre	2002	1st	New game
Strategic Command Gold	2006	1st	Re-release
Strategic Command 2: Blitzkrieg	2006	2nd	New Game
Strategic Command 2: Weapons and Warfare	2007	2nd	Expansion
Strategic Command 2: Patton Drives East	2008	2nd	Expansion
Strategic Command: Pacific Theatre	2008	2nd	New game
Strategic Command: WW2 Global Conflict	2010	2nd	New game
Strategic Command: WW2 Global Conflict Gold	2011	2nd	Expansion
Strategic Command WW1: The Great War 1914-1918	2011	2nd	New game
Strategic Command WW1: Breakthrough!	2012	2nd	Expansion
Strategic Command: WW2 Assault on Communism	2013	2nd	Expansion
Strategic Command: WW2 Assault on Democracy	2013	2nd	Expansion
Strategic Command: War in Europe	2017	3rd	New game
Strategic Command Classic: WW1	2017	2nd	Re-release
Strategic Command Classic: WW2	2018	2nd	Re-release
Strategic Command Classic: Global Conflict	2018	2nd	Re-release
Strategic Command WW2: World At War	2018	3rd	New game
Strategic Command: World War I	2019	3rd	New game
Strategic Command: Complete	2019	3rd	Bundle
Strategic Command: American Civil War	2022	3rd	New game
Strategic Command: American Civil War - Wars in the Americas	2023	3rd	Expansion
Strategic Command: World War I - Empires in Turmoil	2023	3rd	Expansion
Strategic Command WWII: War in the Pacific	2024	3rd	New game
Strategic Command WWII: War in the Pacific - Rise and Fall of an Empire	2025	3rd	Expansion
Strategic Command: American Civil War - Concert of Europe	2025	3rd	Expansion

=== First game engine ===
The first game in the series, Strategic Command: European Theater, was released in 2002. It took place on a hex map, with one hexagon representing 50 miles of terrain. The game featured six campaigns, all taking place on the same map, but with different starting dates. Creating fan-made campaigns was also possible.

The player could choose the neutral states to act "random", "historical" or "neutral". With the "random" option, neutral states may decide to join the war depending on current situation, while "historical" means joining the war on an exact, historical date, regardless of the circumstances (for example, the USA will always become an Allied country on December 8, 1941). With the "neutral" option, those states won't join the war, unless it will be directly declared against them.

Strategic Command: European Theater was re-released in 2006 as Strategic Command Gold with additional campaigns.

=== Second game engine ===
Strategic Command 2: Blitzkrieg, released in 2006, was the first game in the series using maps divided into squares (or "tiles"), once again focusing on the European Theater of World War II (although a free "Global War" campaign was later added with a patch). Unlike the previous installment, Blitzkrieg features not only campaigns taking place on the map of whole Europe and Atlantic Ocean, spreading from 1939 until the end of the war, but also scenarios played on smaller maps, such as Battle of Kursk or Battle of the Bulge. Diplomacy and weather conditions were also added to the game. This time, creating not only fan-made campaigns, but also custom maps was possible.

Two expansion packs were released: Weapons and Warfare and Patton Drives East. The first one added new terrain types, roads and rail lines to the game, while the second one included new campaigns and scenarios, some of them post-World War II or fictional, including the titular "Patton Drives East", which portrays a hypothetical conflict between the US and USSR following the defeat of Nazi Germany. Strategic Command 2: Blitzkrieg was re-released in 2018 as Strategic Command Classic: WW2, bundled together with the two expansions and Strategic Command: WWII Pacific Theatre.

Strategic Command WWII Pacific Theater, which premiered in 2008 and was based on the same game engine as Blitzkrieg, was the first game in the series not taking place in Europe, instead focusing on Asia and the Pacific Ocean theatre of World War II. The game also introduced more advanced options for controlling aircraft carriers and submarines.

Strategic Command WWII Global Conflict, was released in 2010 and based on the same game engine as Blitzkrieg. It takes place on a map of the whole world. Since then further releases of add-ons to Global Conflict have included larger scale maps and additional unit types initially as a "Gold" release. Two expansions were released for this in 2013, Assault on Communism and Assault on Democracy, the former being World War II from 1941 mainly relating to USSR, and the latter a very much larger (x 4) world map with both a complete World War II scenario plus some extra more localized campaigns. This was re-released in 2018 as Classic Strategic Command: World War II - Global Conflict, bundled with the two expansions Assault on Communism and Assault on Democracy.

=== Third game engine ===
Strategic Command: War in Europe (essentially Strategic Command 3) was announced in 2016, featuring an updated version of the game engine using hexes. It was followed in 2018 by Strategic Command: World at War, a WW2 war-game based on the update engine of War in Europe and played out on a world map. In 2019, Strategic Command: World War I was released. The first three titles in the third series were released bundled together as Strategic Command: Complete in 2019.

Strategic Command: American Civil War, a game focusing on the 1861-65 American Civil War, and the first official game outside of the 20th century, followed in 2022, again based on the updated game engine of War in Europe.

== Reception ==
Aggregate review scores As of December 12, 2009.
Game	GameRankings	Metacritic
Strategic Command: European Theater	67%	70%
Strategic Command 2: Blitzkrieg	62%	64%
Strategic Command WWII Pacific Theater	-	-

Strategic Command games were given average to favorable reviews from game critics. GameSpot described the first game as being "a notch or two above Hasbro's Axis & Allies board game and nowhere near the daunting challenge of Avalon Hill's intimidating Third Reich", concluding that "fans of SSI's Clash of Steel from 1993 will feel right at home". Reviewers noticed a contrast between the game's interesting gameplay and rather plain graphics and sound effects. IGN commented: "loads of substance, but not much style," while Strategy Informer described the second game as being "for the hardcore of turn-based strategists, as otherwise you could soon be finding yourself turned away by the lack of visual and audio passion".
