= Strategic Command 2: Blitzkrieg =

2006 video game

- Developer(s): Fury Software
- Publisher(s): Battlefront.com
- Platform(s): Microsoft Windows
- Release: 2006
- Genre(s): Turn-based strategy
- Mode(s): Single player, multiplayer (by hotseat or PBEM)

Strategic Command 2: Blitzkrieg is a grand strategy computer game developed by Canadian studio Fury Software, and published by Battlefront.com in 2006. The second game in the Strategic Command series, Blitzkrieg is a turn-based strategy set in World War II, focusing on the European Theater. The player controls all of either Axis or Allied states.

A sequel to Strategic Command: European Theater, Blitzkrieg was the first game in the series to include weather conditions, new unit types such as paratroops and engineers, as well as diplomatic pressure.

Two expansion packs were later released. The first one, Weapons and Warfare adds new units, combat rules, a deeper weather model, additional terrain types and the simulation of roads and railways, while the second one, Patton Drives East, adds new campaigns and scenarios, some of them – for the first time in the series – post-World War II or hypothetical.

== Gameplay ==
Strategic Command 2: Blitzkrieg is a turn-based strategy set in World War II. The player controls all of either the Axis or Allied states. The most important fraction of the game is commanding the military units, but the player also controls the research of technologies and diplomatic relations.

Blitzkrieg was the first game in the series to feature weather conditions (such as rain or snow, which, for example, hampers the movement of air units), as well as diplomatic pressure. Using this feature, the player may eventually persuade a neutral country to either join the war on his side, or to prevent it from becoming his enemy.

The major campaigns take place on a map encompassing all of Europe, as well as North Africa, Atlantic Ocean and east coast of North America. However, unlike the previous installment, Blitzkrieg also contains five scenarios played on smaller maps, namely North Africa, Battle of Kursk, D-Day, Operation Market Garden and the Battle of the Bulge. Additional Global Map campaign was later released for free with a patch.

== Expansion packs ==
=== Weapons and Warfare ===
The first expansion pack to Strategic Command 2, titled Weapons and Warfare, adds new units, enhanced naval movement and combat rules, a deeper weather model, additional terrain types and resources, and the simulation of roads and railways.

=== Patton Drives East ===
The second expansion pack, Patton Drives East, adds new campaigns and scenarios to the game, among them – for the first time in the series – post-World War II or fictional conflicts, including the titular "Patton Drives East", a hypothetical war between the US and USSR following the defeat of Nazi Germany.

== Reception ==
Reception

Aggregate scores
Aggregator	Score
GameRankings	62%
Metacritic	64%

Review scores
Publication	Score
IGN	5.9 out of 10
PC Zone	74 out of 10
Gamers' Temple	58%
Strategy Informer	6.7 out of 10

Strategic Command 2: Blitzkrieg gathered average reviews from game critics. IGN noticed a contrast between the game's interesting gameplay and rather plain graphics and sound effects, commenting: "loads of substance, but not much style," while Strategy Informer noted "this game really is for the hardcore of turn-based strategists, as otherwise you could soon be finding yourself turned away by the lack of visual and audio passion in Strategic Command 2". Reviewing the game for Armchair General in April 2006, Bob Mackey praised the graphics and presentation of the game but criticised the AI, giving the game 81% overall. Armchair General also positively reviewed the Weapons & Warfare expansion pack, praising the improved AI.
