= Strategic Command: European Theater =

2002 video game

Strategic Command – European Theater
- Developer: Fury Software
- Publisher: Battlefront.com
- Designer: Hubert Cater
- Programmer: Hubert Cater
- Composer: Matt Faller
- Platform: Windows
- Release: NA: July 16, 2002; EU: October 24, 2003
- Genre: Turn based strategy
- Modes: Single-player, multiplayer

Strategic Command: European Theater is the first game in the Strategic Command strategy game series, and is a turn based strategy game set in World War II. It allows you to play the Allies or the Axis. The smaller European nations can go either way depending on how the Axis or Allies act towards them. Although on historical mode some nations join the allies or axis by default while others depend on the course of the war and aggression of the major powers.

The game runs from 1939 till 1947 where unless you control the world the war ends. The game also features 6 major campaigns:

- Fall Weiss (invasion of Poland)
- Fall Gelb (invasion of France)
- Operation Barbarossa (German invasion of the USSR launched from occupied Poland)
- Fall Blau (German advances towards Stalingrad)
- Zitadelle (Soviet counterattack on the eastern front)
- Overlord (the allied invasion of Europe)

The game was re-released in 2006 as Strategic Command Gold.

== Reception ==
Reception

Aggregate score
Aggregator	Score
Metacritic	70/100

Review scores
Publication	Score
Computer Gaming World	2.5/5
GameSpot	7.2/10
GameSpy	88%
GameZone	6/10
PC Gamer (UK)	73%
PC Gamer (US)	90%

The game received "average" reviews according to the review aggregation website Metacritic. In the review for the US edition of PC Gamer, William Trotter praised the game saying that it was "about as clean and elegant and easy-to-learn as a wargame can be", and gave it a score of 90%. Writing for Computer Gaming World in 2002, Bruce Geryk gave the game 2.5 out of 5 stars, stating that the game was "fun for a little while, but that's it", criticising particularly the limited options available to the player and the excessive weighting of the game in favour of the Allies and against the Axis.
