= Combat Mission: Shock Force =

2007 video game

- Developer(s): Battlefront.com
- Publisher(s): Paradox Interactive
- Designer(s): Charles Moylan; Stephen Grammont
- Programmer(s): Charles Moylan
- Composer(s): Daniel Sadowski; Matt Faller
- Series: Combat Mission
- Platform(s): Windows
- Release: EU: August 3, 2007; NA: August 6, 2007; AU: September 13, 2007
- Genre(s): Computer wargame
- Mode(s): Single player

Combat Mission: Shock Force is a computer wargame by American studio Battlefront.com in the Combat Mission series of games that covers a fictional United States invasion of Syria, focusing on U.S. Stryker brigades. It was released in 2007, marking the debut of the CMX2 game engine, the second generation of Combat Mission games.

== Overview ==
Shock Force depicts fictional battles in the year 2008 between the Syrian Army and US Stryker Brigades. This is the original incarnation of Battlefront.com's Combat Mission series using the new CMX2 game engine. Shock Force features improved graphics and 3D modelling. Modelling of infantry features a 1:1 representation, where every single soldier is depicted in the 3D world by its own animated graphic. The new engine also features real world lighting conditions, and models sun and star positions in the sky. The engine allows the game to be played in real time in addition to the established 60-second incremental format.

Each scenario in the game contains forces drawn from either the US or Syrian Regular Army units utilizing Soviet-bloc equipment such as AK-47 assault rifles and T-72 tanks, with "blue vs. blue" and "red vs. red" scenarios also possible. "Insurgent" units are available as a sub-selection, representing guerrilla forces drawn from the Syrian population.

== Content ==
The game shipped in a jewel case with a DVD-ROM and a printed manual. "Special Edition" versions shipped with a printed full-color poster of Syria with unit dispositions of the fictional invasion from the "Task Force Thunder" campaign marked on it, as well as a custom printed mouse pad.

Game content included a campaign of several linked scenarios, pre-made scenarios ("battles"), and maps for the "Quick Battle" system which permitted random play in one or two player mode. The game shipped with a fully operational map and scenario editor as well as a campaign creation tool.

== Reception ==
Combat Mission: Shock Force

Aggregate score
Aggregator	Score
Metacritic	62/100

Review scores
Publication	Score
Eurogamer	5/10
GameSpot	4.5/10
GameZone	8/10
IGN	5.2/10
PC Gamer (UK)	60%
PC Gamer (US)	50%
PC Zone	60%

The game received "mixed" reviews according to the review aggregation website Metacritic. GameSpot's review started with the tag line "Combat Mission says good-bye to WWII, but hello to an inept interface, broken AI, and hideous visuals."

GamingShogun reviewed a later version of the game after several patches and stated it was "one of the most fun battle simulations" they have ever played.

== Expansions ==
=== Marines ===
Combat Mission: Shock Force - Marines

Aggregate score
Aggregator	Score
Metacritic	73/100

Review scores
Publication	Score
IGN	6.7/10
PC Gamer (UK)	75%

An expansion, called Combat Mission: Shock Force - Marines, was released in September 2008 and marketed by direct sale through Battlefront's website, requiring Combat Mission: Shock Force to play. The module was sold by direct download, physical disc, or both, and included the latest patch for the Shock Force base game, which was also made available via free download to all non-Marines customers and works without the module for owners of the base game. Content of Marines include an increased number of units, 15 standalone scenarios, a 14-mission campaign, and 25 new Quick Battle maps. New units represent United States Marine Corps and Syrian Airborne troops, as well as regular Syrian units such as the T-90 tank.

Marines received "average" reviews, a bit more positive than the original Shock Force, according to Metacritic. IGN said that Marines was "slightly improved."

=== British Forces ===
A second expansion module was released on July 29, 2009, bringing the British Armed Forces to the Syrian battlefield. This new module introduces units, vehicles and weapons currently in service with the British military, such as the Challenger 2 tank and Warrior IFV, and also includes the US IBCT. There is a new campaign from the British perspective, and new standalone scenarios. There are minor changes to the Syrian side, and the expansion patches the base game to version 1.20.

=== NATO ===
A third expansion module for the game was announced on May 13, 2010. This module features NATO and Coalition forces, specifically the German, Canadian and Dutch armies.
