= Battlefront.com =

Video game developer and publisher

- Industry: Video games
- Founded: 1997
- Founder: Steve Grammont; Charles Moylan
- Products: Combat Mission; Strategic Command; Theatre of War
- Website: Battlefront.com

Battlefront.com is a video game developer and publisher located in Dover Foxcroft, Maine. Battlefront specialises in war-related games, including turn-based and real-time strategies, as well as simulations of air, land and naval military vehicles. On August 27th 2024, the 25th Anniversary of Combat Mission, Battlefront was acquired by Matrix Games.

Apart from publishing the self-developed Combat Mission series, the company publishes games created by other studios (such as 1C Company), including Strategic Command and Theatre of War series.

== History ==
The company began life as Big Time Software when Charles Moylan and Steve Grammont decided to form an independent game company. They produced the successful and unique Combat Mission: Beyond Overlord to critical acclaim in 1999. The fledgling company utilized an online sales model and published a manifesto on its website pledging dedication to its fanbase.

The company continued to grow as subsequent titles in the CM series were released, and other publishers began to partner with BTS. A name change to battlefront.com, coinciding with the domain name of the official website, followed.

== List of games published ==
| Release date | Title | Genre | Platform | Developer | Notes |
|---|---|---|---|---|---|
| 2000 | Combat Mission: Beyond Overlord | Hybrid turn-based / real-time strategy | Macintosh, Windows | Battlefront.com | The first game in the Combat Mission series. |
| 2002 | Strategic Command: European Theater | Turn-based strategy | Windows | Fury Software | The first game in the Strategic Command series. |
| 2002 | Combat Mission II: Barbarossa to Berlin | Turn-based / real-time strategy | Macintosh, Windows | Battlefront.com | The second game in the CM series. |
| 2003 | Combat Mission 3: Afrika Korps | Turn-based / real-time strategy | Macintosh, Windows | Battlefront.com | The third game in the CM series. |
| 2005 | T-72: Balkans On Fire! | Vehicle simulation | Windows | 1C Company | |
| 2005 | Down in Flames | Vehicle simulation | Windows | Dan Verssen Games | |
| 2005 | Strategic Command 2: Blitzkrieg | Turn-based strategy | Windows | Fury Software | The second game in the SC series. |
| 2006 | DropTeam: Mechanized Combat in the Far Future | Real-time strategy | Linux, Macintosh, Windows | TBG Software | |
| 2006 | Down in Flames: Eastern Front | Vehicle simulation | Windows | Dan Verssen Games | Expansion pack for Down in Flames. |
| 2007 | Theatre of War | Real-time strategy | Windows | 1C Company | The first game in the Theatre of War series. |
| 2007 | Combat Mission: Shock Force | Turn-based / real-time strategy | Windows | Battlefront.com | The fourth game in the CM series. |
| 2007 | Strategic Command 2: Weapons and Warfare | Turn-based strategy | Windows | Fury Software | Expansion pack for Strategic Command 2. |
| 2008 | Strategic Command 2: Patton Drives East | Turn-based strategy | Windows | Fury Software | Expansion pack for Strategic Command 2. |
| 2008 | Strategic Command WWII Pacific Theater | Turn-based strategy | Windows | Fury Software | The third game in the SC series. |
| 2008 | Combat Mission: Shock Force - Marines | Turn-based / real-time strategy | Windows | Battlefront.com | Expansion pack for Combat Mission: Shock Force. |
| 2009 | Combat Mission: Shock Force - British Forces | Turn-based / real-time strategy | Windows | Battlefront.com | Expansion pack for Combat Mission: Shock Force. |
| 2009 | Theatre of War 2: Africa 1943 | Real-time strategy | Windows | 1C Company | The second game in the Theatre of War series. |
| 2009 | Theatre of War 2: Centauro | Real-time strategy | Windows | 1C Company | Expansion pack of Theatre of War 2: Africa 1943 |
| 2009 | Empires of Steel | Turn-based strategy | Windows | Atomicboy Software | |
| 2009 | PT Boats: Knights of the Sea | Simulation | Windows | Akella | |
| 2009 | Combat Mission: Afghanistan | Turn-based / real-time strategy | Windows | Snowball | The fifth game in the CM series |
| 2010 | Strategic Command WWII Global Conflict | Turn-based strategy | Windows | Fury Software | The fourth game in the SC series. |
| 2010 | Theatre of War 2: Kursk 1943 | Real-time strategy | Windows | 1C Company | Expansion pack for Theatre of War 2: Africa 1943 |
| 2010 | CM:SF - NATO | Turn-based / real-time strategy | Windows | | The third module for Shock Force. |
| 2010 | CM: Battle for Normandy | Turn-based / real-time strategy | Windows/Mac | | The first game to utilize the CM:X2 engine. |
| 2012 | Combat Mission: Fortress Italy | Turn-based / real-time strategy | Windows/Mac | | Second title utilizing the CM:X2 engine. |
| 2014 | CM:Red Thunder | Turn-based / real-time strategy | Windows/Mac | | Third title utilizing the CM:X2 game engine and the first to be set on the Eastern Front of World War II. |
| 2014 | Combat Mission: Black Sea | Turn-based / real-time strategy | Windows/Mac | | Presents a (then fictitious) escalation to open warfare between Russia and Ukraine, with NATO intervening. |
| 2016 | Combat Mission: Final Blitzkrieg | Turn-based / real-time strategy | Windows/Mac | | Set during the final months of World War II. |
| 2018 | Combat Mission: Shock Force 2 | Turn-based / real-time strategy | Windows/Mac | Battlefront.com | A graphical improvement over Shock Force 1. |
| 2021 | Combat Mission: Cold War | Turn-based / real-time strategy | Windows/Mac | Battlefront.com | Presents a Cold War gone hot scenario. |

== In development ==
| Announced | Title | Genre | Platform | Developer | Notes |

== Cancelled games ==
| First announced | Cancelled | Title | Genre | Platform | Developer | Notes |
|---|---|---|---|---|---|---|
| 2004 | 5 November 2009 | Modern Naval Battles: World War II at Sea | Simulation | Windows | Dan Verssen Games | Would be based on a board game of the same name |
| 2005 | 2009 | Combat Mission: Campaigns | Turn-based / real-time strategy | Windows | Hunting Tank Software | Had been in development well before 2005; work was mainly by private software company under license. |
| 2005 | 2009 | Histwar: Les Grognards | Turn-based / real-time strategy | Windows | | |

== Personnel ==
Matt Faller spent nine years as chief information officer and project manager, leaving the company for employment with Software Generation Ltd. in August 2009. Faller's duties involved design, implementation and support of the battlefront's IT infrastructure and management of customer support.

On July 1, 2010, Battlefront hired Phillip Culliton as a "First Second Programmer" after operating for 13 years with a single coder.
