= Carrier Strike =

1992 video game

Carrier Strike: South Pacific 1942-44
- Developer(s): Strategic Simulations
- Publisher(s): Strategic Simulations
- Designer(s): Gary Grigsby
- Platform(s): MS-DOS
- Release: 1992
- Genre(s): Computer wargame

Carrier Strike: South Pacific 1942-44 is a 1992 computer wargame designed by Gary Grigsby and published by Strategic Simulations Inc. It is a successor to Grigsby's earlier title Carrier Force.

== Gameplay ==
Set in World War II, Carrier Strike is a computer wargame that simulates battles in the Pacific Theater between the Allies and Imperial Japan.

== Development ==
Carrier Strike was designed by Gary Grigsby for Strategic Simulations Inc. (SSI). It began development as "an offshoot" of Gary Grigsby's Pacific War, which was in production at the time; the initial version of Carrier Strike was made during a week of free time on that project. Grigsby explained that Carrier Strike was his way of revisiting his early game Carrier Force (1983). He told Electronic Games, "I liked the subject matter and, given the evolution in computer capability and my programming skills, I wanted to refine it."

Carrier Strike was developed with a modified version of the game engine from Grigsby's games Second Front: Germany Turns East and Western Front. He noted that the biggest challenge during production was adapting the games' interface to the new setting, and that the subsequent flight-deck interface originated from "a bull session at SSI". For the game's artificial intelligence (AI), he said that the subject matter made coding relatively simple, and that he had avoided letting the AI "cheat" in ways that many of his previous games had not. The score for Carrier Strike was composed by Donald Griffin of Computer Music Consulting.

Carrier Strike was launched in 1992, prior to Pacific War. Grigsby and SSI followed the game with the Carrier Strike Expansion Disk, which alters Carrier Strike's gameplay mechanics and adds new playable battles. Unlike the original game's retail release, it was launched via mail order.

== Reception ==
Reception

Review score
Publication	Score
PC Review	6/10

According to M. Evan Brooks of Computer Gaming World, Carrier Strike had reached sales of 15,000 copies by September 1992. The game was released in competition with Carriers at War by Strategic Studies Group, a game whose highly-anticipated status drew more attention toward Carrier Strike, Computer Gaming World's Alan Emrich argued.

Emrich offered Carrier Strike a positive review, and Computer Gaming World nominated the game, alongside Grigsby's Western Front, for its "Wargame of the Year" prize. William R. Trotter of Game Player's PC Entertainment called it an "engrossing and handsome simulation" that he "recommend[ed] ... most enthusiastically".
