= Battle of Britain (1999 video game) =

- Developer: TalonSoft
- Publisher: TalonSoft
- Designers: Gary Grigsby, Keith Brors
- Platform: Windows
- Release: NA: March 16, 1999; EU: 1999
- Genre: Grand strategy wargame
- Modes: Single-player, multiplayer

Battle of Britain is a 1999 computer wargame developed and published by TalonSoft. It was designed by Gary Grigsby and Keith Brors.

== Gameplay ==
Set in World War II, Battle of Britain is a computer wargame that simulates the conflict between Germany and the United Kingdom during the Battle of Britain.

== Development ==
Battle of Britain was developed by TalonSoft and was designed by Gary Grigsby and Keith Brors. The pair had previously co-created the Steel Panthers series at Strategic Simulations Inc. (SSI), but had left the company in late 1997 to join TalonSoft, with the stated goal of making a wargame based on the Battle of Britain. It was planned as the pair's first of three games for TalonSoft, and was originally entitled Battle of Britain 1941 and set for a release date of August 1998. According to Alan Dunkin of GameSpot, the game was envisioned as a semi-remake of Grigsby's earlier game U.S.A.A.F. - United States Army Air Force. It was Grigsby's first attempt at an air-combat title since U.S.A.A.F.; the subject matter was relatively rare in computer wargames at the time. Grigsby and Brors developed the game while simultaneously working on a fourth Steel Panthers game at SSI.

The game was Grigsby's first game developed for Microsoft Windows.

== Reception ==
Reception

Aggregate score
| Aggregator | Score |
|---|---|
| GameRankings | 70% |

Review scores
| Publication | Score |
|---|---|
| CNET Gamecenter | 7/10 |
| Computer Games Strategy Plus | 2.5/5 |
| Computer Gaming World | 4/5 |
| GamePro | 3.5/5 |
| GameSpot | 7.7/10 |
| GameStar | 35% |
| Génération 4 | 2/6 |
| Jeuxvideo.com | 12/20 |
| PC Gamer (US) | 70% |
| PC Games (DE) | 52% |

According to David Chong of Computer Games Strategy Plus, critical reactions toward the game were "lukewarm", as it received above-average reviews according to the review aggregation website GameRankings. Reviewing the game for PC Gamer US, William R. Trotter concluded, "There's a lot to admire in the depth and accuracy of this simulation, but you'd better be a serious student of the World War Two air war. For everyone else, it may just be too much work."

== Legacy ==
In late 1999, the game received a "follow-up" game from TalonSoft, entitled 12 O'Clock High: Bombing the Reich. It was again designed by Gary Grigsby and Keith Brors. It reused the game engine from Battle of Britain. In 2009, publisher Matrix Games reworked and re-released the game and 12 O'Clock High together as Gary Grigsby's Eagle Day to Bombing the Reich.
