= Gary Grigsby's War in Russia =

1993 video game

- Developer(s): Strategic Simulations
- Publisher(s): Strategic Simulations
- Designer(s): Gary Grigsby
- Platform(s): MS-DOS
- Release: 1993
- Genre(s): Computer wargame

Gary Grigsby's War in Russia is a 1993 computer wargame developed and published by Strategic Simulations, Inc. Designed by Gary Grigsby, it is adapted from the 1990 title Second Front: Germany Turns East, itself adapted from Grigsby's 1984 War in Russia.

== Gameplay ==
Gary Grigsby's War in Russia is a computer wargame that simulates the Eastern Front conflict during World War II, in the war between Germany and Soviet Russia. It features a map editor that allows players to create custom scenarios.

== Development ==
War in Russia was based on designer Gary Grigsby's earlier title Second Front: Germany Turns East, itself based on his game War in Russia. According to Ed Dille of Electronic Games, an important part of the new game was to address concerns in Second Front that "units retained too much mobility". The game also added a mouse-based interface, new battles and VGA graphics.

== Reception ==
Reception

Review score
Publication	Score
Electronic Games	78%

Computer Gaming World's M. Evan Brooks wrote, "A workmanlike simulation, WIR should be acquired by any grognard who does not have Second Front." Reviewing it for Electronic Games, Ed Dille was somewhat mixed on the game. Conversely, William R. Trotter of Game Players PC Entertainment was strongly positive toward it, and believed that it would "become a landmark in the history of computer war games."

== Legacy ==
In 2007, Retro Gamer reported that Gary Grigsby's War in Russia "is regarded by some as Grigsby's finest SSI outing."

In August 2000, publisher Matrix Games launched an updated re-release of War in Russia, made available as freeware. Grigsby had joined Matrix earlier that year. The new War in Russia came amid Matrix's re-releases of Grigsby's titles Steel Panthers and Pacific War.
