= Gary Grigsby's War Between the States =

2008 video game

- Developer(s): 2 by 3 Games
- Publisher(s): Matrix Games
- Designer(s): Gary Grigsby
- Platform(s): Windows
- Release: June 12, 2008
- Genre(s): Computer wargame
- Mode(s): Single-player, multiplayer

Gary Grigsby's War Between the States is a 2008 computer wargame developed by 2 by 3 Games and published by Matrix Games. It simulates the conflict between the Union and the Confederacy during the American Civil War.

== Development ==
War Between the States was released on June 12, 2008.

== Reception ==
Reception

Review scores
Publication	Score
Armchair General	83%
Giochi per il mio computer	7.5/10
Wargamer	9/10

According to Joel Billings of 2 by 3 Games, War Between the States was "not a financial success for us". He attributed its performance to competition from rival wargames set during the American Civil War, which had launched not long before War Between the States. It received a "bronze" prize in Usenet's "War-Historical Wargame of the Year" award category.

Armchair General said the game "[...] is highly recommended for turn-based strategy fans." but "Players new to strategy gaming or those looking for light fare might find it a little too deep for their tastes [...]". Giochi per il mio computer called it a valid alternative to Forge of Freedom: The American Civil War. They praised the robust artificial intelligence (AI) but criticized the lack of scenarios. Wargamer summarized: "This game achieves everything necessary for strategy gaming greatness." Muropaketti gave a negative review, calling the user interface unclear. No Greater Glory (1991) was noted as a better game about American Civil War.
