= Battle Group (video game) =

1986 video game

- Developer(s): Strategic Simulations
- Publisher(s): Strategic Simulations
- Designer(s): Gary Grigsby
- Platform(s): Apple II, Commodore 64
- Release: 1986
- Genre(s): Wargame
- Mode(s): Single-player, multiplayer

Battle Group is a 1986 computer wargame designed by Gary Grigsby and published by Strategic Simulations. It is a follow-up to Grigsby's earlier Kampfgruppe.

== Gameplay ==
Battle Group is a computer wargame that simulates the Western Front of World War II at the platoon scale, between 1943 and 1945. It features an editor that allows players to create their own combat scenarios.

== Development ==
Battle Group was designed by Gary Grigsby and published by Strategic Simulations. It is a follow-up to Grigsby's game Kampfgruppe, and reuses that title's game engine and mechanics. Battle Group was released in 1986, the same year Grigsby and SSI launched Warship.

== Reception ==
Reception

Review score
Publication	Score
Computer Play	6.38/10

Jay Selover reviewed the game for Computer Gaming World, and stated that "Just as the title of the game is a translation of the earlier title, the game itself is basically a translation. The system, mechanics, and design are straight from Kampfgruppe; and here even the "feel" of the combat is still very World War II-ish." Commodore Microcomputers named Battle Group one of the top computer wargames of 1986.

In his 1989 survey of computer wargames, J. L. Miller of Computer Play offered the game a middling score.
