= Gary Grigsby =

Video game designer

- Occupations: Computer wargame designer and programmer
- Years active: 1979–present

Gary Grigsby is a designer and programmer of computer wargames. In 1997, he was described as "one of the founding fathers of strategy war games for the PC." Computer Games Magazine later dubbed him "as much of an institution in his niche of computer gaming as Sid Meier, Will Wright, or John Carmack are in theirs."

== Career ==
Gary Grigsby purchased a TRS-80 computer in May 1979, to write wargames, but did not know how to approach the two publishers of computer wargames, Strategic Simulations (SSI) and Avalon Hill. In February 1982, he called SSI to complain about a bug in its Torpedo Fire; during the conversation Joel Billings encouraged Grigsby to submit his designs. That year Guadalcanal Campaign, written in BASIC, became his first game for SSI, and was nominated for "Best Adventure Game for Home Computer" at the 1983 Origins Game Fair. Through 1997 he created for SSI several titles that are considered classics of the wargame genre, including Kampfgruppe, USAAF, War in Russia and the Steel Panthers series. Two games, Battle of Britain and 12 O'clock High, were done for TalonSoft in the late 90s. In 2001 Grigsby started a game development company called 2 By 3 Games with Billings and Keith Brors. Their latest Grigsby-designed title, Gary Grigsby's War in the East 2, was released by Matrix Games in 2021.

== Ludography ==
- Guadalcanal Campaign (1982)
- Bomb Alley (1982)
- North Atlantic '86 (1983)
- Carrier Force (1983)
- Objective: Kursk (1984)
- War in Russia (1984)
- Reforger '88 (1984)
- Kampfgruppe (1985)
- Mech Brigade (1985)
- USAAF (1985)
- Battlegroup (1986)
- Warship (1986)
- War in the South Pacific (1987)
- Battle Cruiser (1987)
- Panzer Strike (1988)
- Typhoon of Steel (1988)
- Overrun! (1989)
- Second Front: Germany Turns East (1990)
- Western Front (1991)
- Carrier Strike (1992)
- Gary Grigsby's Pacific War (1992)
- Gary Grigsby's War in Russia (1993)
- Steel Panthers (1995)
- Steel Panthers II: Modern Battles (1996)
- Steel Panthers III: Brigade Command 1939–1999 (1997)
- Battle of Britain (1999)
- 12 O'Clock High: Bombing the Reich (1999)
- Uncommon Valor: Campaign for the South Pacific (2002)
- War in the Pacific: The Struggle Against Japan 1941–1945 (2004)
- Gary Grigsby's World at War (2005)
- Gary Grigsby's World at War A World Divided (2006)
- Gary Grigsby's War Between the States (2008)
- Gary Grigsby's War in the East (2010)
- Gary Grigsby's War in the West (2014)
- Gary Grigsby's War in the East 2 (2021)
