= Steel Panthers II: Modern Battles =

1996 video game

- Developer: Strategic Simulations
- Publisher: Strategic Simulations
- Producer: Carl C. Norman
- Designers: Keith Brors; Gary Grigsby
- Programmers: Keith Brors; Gary Grigsby
- Artist: Maurie Manning
- Composers: Danny Pelfrey; Rick Rhodes
- Series: Steel Panthers
- Platform: MS-DOS
- Release: November 1, 1996
- Genre: Tactical wargame
- Modes: Single-player, multiplayer

Steel Panthers II: Modern Battles is a computer wargame developed and published by Strategic Simulations. It was designed by Gary Grigsby and Keith Brors and released in 1996 for MS-DOS. The game is the sequel to Steel Panthers and the second entry in the Steel Panthers series. Like its predecessor, Steel Panthers II was commercially successful.

== Gameplay ==
Steel Panthers II is a computer wargame that simulates modern warfare.

== Development ==
A key goal for Steel Panthers II was offering improved animation. The game was released on November 1, 1996.

== Reception ==
Reception

Review scores
Publication	Score
Computer Games Strategy Plus	3/5
Computer Gaming World	4.5/5
PC Gamer (US)	80%
PC Games	A−

Following Steel Panthers' strong commercial performance, Steel Panthers II was a "major success", according to author Rusel DeMaria. Among other theories, he speculated that the deployment of tanks in Operation Desert Storm could have influenced its sales. Steel Panthers II was nominated as Computer Games Strategy Plus's 1996 wargame of the year, although it lost to that year's Battleground games: Shiloh, Antietam and Waterloo. It was also a nominee for CNET Gamecenter's "Strategy Game of the Year" award, which went to Civilization II.

William R. Trotter of PC Gamer US was largely positive toward Steel Panthers II, but felt that it was held back by its technical problems, glitches and oversights. He concluded, "If not for the numerous little flaws that keep it from realizing its own best intentions, this would have been my nominee for Wargame of the Year." In Computer Games Strategy Plus, Robert Mayer was less impressed: he considered it visually impressive but unrealistic, with numerous historical oversights. He nevertheless called it "a worthy successor to a very successful game".

Steel Panthers and Steel Panthers II were named, collectively, the 62nd best computer game ever by PC Gamer UK in 1997.

== Legacy ==
The game was followed by Steel Panthers III: Brigade Command 1939-1999. The Camo Workshop released a mod based on Steel Panthers II called SP2WW2 (Steel Panthers II: World War 2) in 1998.
