= Eastern Front =

Eastern Front may refer to:

== War fronts ==
- Eastern Front (World War I)
- Eastern Front (World War II)
- Eastern Front (Turkey), of the Turkish War of Independence
  - Turkish invasion of Armenia, often referred to by itself as the Eastern Front
- Eastern Front (Sudan)
- Eastern Front of the Russian Civil War
  - Eastern Front of the Red Army
- Eastern Front of the Indo-Pakistani war of 1971
- Eastern front of the Russo-Ukrainian war (2022–present)

== Media ==
- 1635: The Eastern Front, a 2010 novel by Eric Flint
- East Front (board game), a 1976 board wargame
- EastFront, 1991 board wargame
- Eastern Front (1941), a 1981 video game
- East Front (video game), a 1997 video game

== See also ==
- Eastern campaign (disambiguation)
- Russian Front (disambiguation)
- Frente Leste, the theater of anti-guerrilla operations for the Portuguese Armed Forces in the East of Angola, during the Portuguese Colonial War (1961–1974)
