= 12 O'Clock High: Bombing the Reich =

1999 video game

- Developer: TalonSoft
- Publisher: TalonSoft
- Platform: Windows
- Release: NA: November 2, 1999; UK: March 3, 2000
- Genre: Computer wargame
- Mode: Single-player

12 O'Clock High: Bombing the Reich is a 1999 computer wargame developed and published by TalonSoft. Designed by Gary Grigsby and Keith Brors, it is follow-up to Battle of Britain and a spiritual sequel to the 1985 wargame U.S.A.A.F. - United States Army Air Force.

== Gameplay ==
The game simulates the strategic bombing campaign of the Allies against the Germans during World War II. Day and night combat are distinguished between. The overall player score is judged by the following: German industry collateral, German town collateral, and Luftwaffe production completion. The game has multiplayer options.

== Development ==
The game was designed by Gary Grigsby and Keith Brors. The game reuses the game engine and interface from Grigsby's previous game with TalonSoft, Battle of Britain. Battle of Britain had marked Grigsby's return to the air-combat wargame format, which he had not attempted since U.S.A.A.F. - United States Army Air Force. While Battle of Britain had been a successor title to U.S.A.A.F., GameSpot's Alan Dunkin described 12 O'Clock High as the older game's "true sequel", as it covered identical subject matter.

== Reception ==
Reception

Review scores
Publication	Score
PC Gamer (US)	78%
CNET Gamecenter	8/10

Bruce Grey of GameSpot acknowledged the game was meticulously researched, but that the result was mediocre at best. CDMag's David Chong compared its "horrible interface" and "unimaginative game engine" to that used in Battle of Britain.
