= Battle Cruiser (video game) =

1987 video game

- Publisher: Strategic Simulations
- Designer: Gary Grigsby
- Platforms: Apple II, Atari 8-bit, Commodore 64
- Release: 1987
- Genre: Computer wargame

Battle Cruiser is a 1987 computer wargame designed by Gary Grigsby and published by Strategic Simulations Inc. (SSI). It is the follow-up to Grigsby's earlier Warship.

== Gameplay ==
Battle Cruiser is a computer wargame that simulates conflict in the Atlantic Ocean during World War I and World War II.

== Development ==
Battle Cruiser was designed by Gary Grigsby and released in 1987, the same year he debuted War in the South Pacific. It serves as a sequel to Grigsby's earlier game Warship, adapted to warfare in the Atlantic Ocean. The game reuses its predecessor's game engine and mechanics, and has been described as a "clone" of Warship with an expanded scope.

== Reception ==
Reception

Review scores
Publication	Score
Computer Play	6.4/10
Current Notes	3/5
Page 6	3.5/5

Reviewing Battle Cruiser for Computer Gaming World, Bob Proctor called it "the exact same game [as Warship] with new Ship and Weapon Tables." M. Evan Brooks of Current Notes offered a similar opinion, but felt that Battle Cruiser was "a better bargain". In Antic, Rich Moore opined that the game's "graphics aren't great, but this quickly becomes secondary".

In a 1988 Page 6 survey of wargames for Atari computers, Brooks wrote of Battle Cruiser, "No new ground is broken, although this is the better bargain given its more extensive coverage." In his similar 1989 survey, J. L. Miller wrote in Computer Play that Battle Cruiser was "historically accurate and recommended for the naval buff."
