= East Front II: The Russian Front =

1999 video game

- Developer: TalonSoft
- Publisher: TalonSoft
- Platform: Windows
- Release: 1999
- Genre: Computer wargame
- Modes: Single-player, multiplayer

East Front II: The Russian Front is a 1999 computer wargame developed and published by TalonSoft. Part of the Campaign series, it is the follow-up to East Front and West Front.

East Front II was followed by Rising Sun and Divided Ground.

== Gameplay ==
East Front II is a computer wargame that simulates conflict on the Eastern Front of World War II between 1939 and 1945.

== Development ==
East Front II was developed by TalonSoft as an entry in its Campaign series, and follow-up to the game East Front. Rather than being a strict sequel, East Front II builds on the foundation of East Front, combining patches for the first game, improvements from the East Front Campaign CD1 expansion pack, additions from West Front and new material. It uses an upgraded version of West Front's game engine. The game was released in 1999.

== Reception ==
Reception

Review scores
Publication	Score
Computer Games Strategy Plus	4/5
Computer Gaming World	4/5
GameSpot	8.2/10
CNET Gamecenter	9/10

Martin E. Cirulis of CNET Gamecenter called East Front II "what East Front should have been." Computer Games Strategy Plus reviewer Richard A. Lechowich similarly dubbed it "a better game than its previous incarnations." In Computer Gaming World, Jim Cobb concurred, but found that the game was "not quite up to the level of West Front, much less The Operational Art of War". GameSpot said: "East Front II is the best tactical level wargame to come out in a long time."

== Legacy ==
The third game in the Campaign series, East Front II was followed by Rising Sun and Divided Ground: Middle East Conflict 1948–1973.
