= West Front (video game) =

1998 computer wargame

- Developer: TalonSoft
- Publisher: TalonSoft
- Platform: Windows
- Release: 1998
- Genre: Computer wargame
- Modes: Single-player, multiplayer

West Front is a 1998 computer wargame developed and published by TalonSoft. It is the sequel to East Front and the second game in the Campaign series.

In 1999, West Front was followed by East Front II: The Russian Front.

== Gameplay ==
West Front is a computer wargame that simulates conflict during the Western Front of World War II and the North African campaign.

== Development ==
West Front was created with an updated version of the game engine from East Front, its direct predecessor. It is the second entry in TalonSoft's Campaign series.

== Reception ==
Reception

Review scores
Publication	Score
Computer Games Strategy Plus	4/5
Computer Gaming World	4/5
PC Gamer (US)	90%
CNET Gamecenter	9/10

According to TalonSoft head Jim Rose, West Front's early sales were strong, and were on track to surpass the roughly 90,000 units sold by its predecessor. By February 2000, the overall Campaign series had achieved global sales above 250,000 copies.

The editors of GameSpot nominated West Front for their 1998 "Wargame of the Year" award, which ultimately went to TalonSoft's The Operational Art of War Vol. 1: 1939–1955. They called West Front "much improved" over its "disappointing" predecessor.

== Legacy ==
The second game in the Campaign series, West Front was followed by East Front II: The Russian Front, Rising Sun and Divided Ground: Middle East Conflict 1948–1973.

== See also ==
- Western Front: The Liberation of Europe 1944–1945
