= Uncommon Valor: Campaign for the South Pacific =

2002 video game

- Developer: 2 by 3 Games
- Publisher: Matrix Games
- Designer: Gary Grigsby
- Platform: Microsoft Windows
- Release: May 15, 2002
- Genre: Computer wargame

Uncommon Valor: Campaign for the South Pacific is a 2002 computer wargame developed by 2 by 3 Games and published by Matrix Games. Designed by Gary Grigsby, it is a successor to Gary Grigsby's Pacific War and a precursor to War in the Pacific.

== Gameplay ==
Uncommon Valor is a turn-based computer wargame that simulates the war between the United States and Imperial Japan during World War II, with a focus on key conflicts in the South Pacific. The game includes 19 historical and hypothetical scenarios.

== Development ==
Uncommon Valor was revealed in January 2001. It was announced as the first of three titles under a deal between publisher Matrix Games and developer 2 by 3 Games, which had recently been co-founded by ex-Strategic Simulations members Joel Billings, Gary Grigsby and Keith Brors.

Uncommon Valor was made as a successor to Gary Grigsby's Pacific War. It was intended as a stepping stone and teaser toward 2 by 3's upcoming War in the Pacific, a full Pacific War follow-up made with the same game engine and general gameplay system as Uncommon Valor. During development, Billings noted that Uncommon Valor was the smaller, more intimate counterpart to War in the Pacific, as it would portray the Pacific War at a smaller scale and with less detail than its planned successor. Grigsby said that Uncommon Valor was nevertheless challenging to make and "overwhelming". He remarked that development "would have been much easier if we hadn't tried to be so darn detailed and realistic." The game reached gold status in late April 2002, and released on May 15.

== Reception ==
Reception

Review scores
Publication	Score
Computer Gaming World	3/5
GameSpot	7.8/10
PC Gamer (US)	89%
PC Zone	61/100

William R. Trotter of PC Gamer US was strongly positive toward Uncommon Valor. He concluded, "In my 12 years of reviewing wargames, I’ve never enjoyed a deeper, richer, more historically plausible simulation." Writing for GameSpot, Stephen Poole argued, "Uncommon Valor takes much time to fathom, but after that time is over, you'll end up enjoying it greatly."

Computer Gaming World's Bruce Geryk was less positive. While he called it "good", he noted serious flaws. He wrote, "[I]t's sort of a miniature version of Pacific War with a magnifying glass held over the Solomon Islands. On one level, this works. On another, it doesn't." In PC Zone, Steve O'Hagan was more negative still, dubbing the game "interesting" but flawed even for dedicated wargame players, as its "ill thought-out interface ... practically collapses under the weight of the information and detail".
