= Gary Grigsby's War in the East =

2010 video game

- Developer: 2 by 3 Games
- Publisher: Matrix Games
- Designer: Gary Grigsby
- Platform: Windows
- Release: December 7, 2010
- Genre: Computer wargame
- Modes: Single-player, multiplayer

Gary Grigsby's War in the East: The German-Soviet War 1941-1945 is a 2010 computer wargame developed by 2 by 3 Games and published by Matrix Games. It simulates the German–Soviet War of World War II. Two sequels were released: Gary Grigsby's War in the West in 2014 and Gary Grigsby's War in the East 2 in 2021.

== Gameplay ==
War in the East is a monster game set on a divisional scale with weekly turns and a hexagonal map where the length of each hex represents ten miles (16 km). It includes four campaigns and eight smaller scenarios. The multiplayer is done via play-by-email.

== Critical reception ==
Reception

Review scores
Publication	Score
Eurogamer	9/10
GameShark	B
PC Gamer	9/10

Eurogamer called the game system elegant, the game monumental, incredibly well researched, and astonishingly easy to start playing. It was also noted as an instant classic. Wargamer concluded: "[...] this product is the definitive game for the Eastern Front. Serious gamers should save their money and get it." Quarter to Three called it the most importance wargame since Combat Mission: Beyond Overlord (2000) GameShark called it "a good, very detailed example of the classic hex-based operational wargame." Muropaketti called War in the East video game history's most magnificent, comprehensive and enjoyable depiction of the German-Soviet war. They said the game has a better scenario selection than War in the Pacific (2004). PCGamesN included the game on their list of best wargames on PC and called it "one of the most evocative representations of World War II warfare ever made." Armchair General reviewed Don to the Danube expansion and gave it a rating of 77%. Muropaketti called Don to the Danube a solid expansion that includes gameplay for both beginner and veteran players.

At the 2010 Charles S. Roberts Awards the game won in the categories "Best 20th Century Era – Modern Computer Wargame" and "Best Computer Game Graphics".

== Sequels ==
=== Gary Grigsby's War in the West ===
Gary Grigsby's War in the West was released on December 4, 2014, for Windows. It covers the years 1943 to 1945 of the Western Front. A beta test period began for the game in September 2013. According to the developer, the game improved aspects of air war, logistics and weather.

Armchair General gave the game a rating of 94% and called it "a thoughtfully designed wargame that will give you an enriched experience at the operational level." Muropaketti gave a rating of three out of five and said the game is not as good as War in the East. Wargamer wrote: "It is an example of all that Wargames should aspire to, while at the same time as a potent reminder of some of wargaming’s greatest problems."

=== Gary Grigsby's War in the East 2 ===
Gary Grigsby's War in the East 2 was released on March 25, 2021, for Windows. It covers the same period as the first War in the East. The artificial intelligence was rebuilt for the game and according to the producers, it features a more dynamic map and deeper logistics system.

Warfare History Network gave a positive preview and concluded: "If you’re looking for a tough but rewarding strategy game that spares no effort when it comes to historical depth, Gary Grigsby’s War in the East 2 is the gift that keeps on giving." V2.fi gave a rating of 4.5 out of 5 and called it a magnificent and huge strategy game that covers the war more comprehensively and accurately than any other game. It was said to be surprisingly quick and easy to play, although one can dive into details if they wish.
