= Second Front: Germany Turns East =

1990 video game

- Developer: Strategic Simulations
- Publisher: Strategic Simulations
- Designer: Gary Grigsby
- Platforms: MS-DOS, Amiga
- Release: 1990
- Genre: Computer wargame

Second Front: Germany Turns East is a 1990 computer wargame developed and published by Strategic Simulations Inc. (SSI). Designed by Gary Grigsby, it is a spiritual successor to his earlier game War in Russia.

== Gameplay ==
Second Front is a grand strategy wargame that simulates the conflict between German and Soviet Russian forces during World War II, along the Eastern Front.

== Development ==
Production of Second Front began in 1989. The game was designed by Gary Grigsby, and was his first project for the IBM PC format. Second Front draws on the design of Grigsby's earlier War in Russia, updated to a grand strategy structure; Grigsby had at first planned it as a straight remake of War in Russia. It was shown off at the Winter Consumer Electronics Show in early 1990, and released around the middle of that year.

== Reception ==
Reception

Review scores
Publication	Score
Games International	Graphics: 7 Gameplay: 9
The Games Machine	94%

According to William R. Trotter of Game Players PC Entertainment, Second Front received critical acclaim, and was "generally hailed as the most satisfying WWII Russian Front war game yet released for the PC format."

Reviewing Second Front for Computer Gaming World, M. Evan Brooks wrote that Second Front was "recommended as a mandatory purchase [for] the grognard". However, he argued that its "documentation may be summed up as abysmal", which increased its learning curve. Gary Bolton of Games International called it "a valuable addition to the already large array of East Front computer games."

== Legacy ==
Grigsby followed Second Front with Western Front, which adapts the Second Front gameplay system to conflicts on World War II's Western Front. Second Front itself was later retooled to create Gary Grigsby's War in Russia, a game that Retro Gamer noted was "regarded by some as Grigsby's finest SSI outing."
