= Kampfgruppe (disambiguation) =

Kampfgruppe is the concept of a flexible combat formation.

Kampfgruppe may also refer to:

- The Combat Groups of the Working Class (German: Kampfgruppen der Arbeiterklasse, KdA,) - paramilitary organisation in East Germany
- In the Luftwaffe, a Kampfgeschwader bomber unit consisted of several Kampfgruppen, which in terms of size were situated somewhere between squadrons and groups of Anglo-American air forces.
- Kampfgruppe (video game), a 1985 war strategy game
