= Carrier Force =

1983 video game

- Developer: Gary Grigsby
- Publisher: Strategic Simulations
- Platforms: Apple II, Atari 8-bit, Commodore 64
- Release: 1983
- Genre: Computer wargame
- Mode: Single-player

Carrier Force is a 1983 computer wargame published by Strategic Simulations for the Apple II, Atari 8-bit computers, and Commodore 64.

Carrier Force was Grigsby's fourth game. While he had started developing games part-time while working for the United States Department of Defense, he left to become a full-time game developer halfway through his third title, North Atlantic '86.

== Gameplay ==
Carrier Force is a computer wargame that simulates aircraft carrier warfare.

== Development ==
Carrier Force was the fourth game by designer Gary Grigsby. It was released in 1983, the same year he debuted North Atlantic '86.

== Reception ==
Reception

Review scores
Publication	Score
Computer Play	6.68/10
Current Notes	3.5/5

Tom Cheche reviewed the game for Computer Gaming World, and stated that "CF has been exhaustively researched, and beautifully produced. In many ways it is the kind of game that we had in mind several years ago when we were daydreaming about where the wargaming hobby was headed now that the computer had arrived."

In a 1985 survey of computer wargames for Current Notes, M. Evan Brooks called Carrier Force "worth the effort for anyone desirous of learning about the period", but considered it "extremely slow in execution" and saw it as having historical errors. In his similar 1989 survey, J. L. Miller of Computer Play found that the game was "hampered by very slow execution" and offered it a middling score.

== Legacy ==
Grigsby decided to build on Carrier Force in his later game Carrier Strike. He told Electronic Games, "I liked the subject matter and, given the evolution in computer capability and my programming skills, I wanted to refine it."

== See also ==
- Carriers at War
