= Bomb Alley =

1983 video game

- Publisher(s): Strategic Simulations
- Writer(s): Gary Grigsby
- Platform(s): Apple II
- Release: 1983
- Genre(s): Computer wargame
- Mode(s): Single-player, multiplayer

Bomb Alley is a 1983 computer wargame designed by Gary Grigsby for the Apple II and published by Strategic Simulations in 1983. It covers the Mediterranean Theatre of World War II.

The game's main scenario is the summer of 1942 when Rommel's forces threatened to capture Cairo and Alexandria. There is also a smaller scenario covering the Battle of Crete in 1941. Bomb Alley was Grigsby's second game, following Guadalcanal Campaign (1982). It reuses that title's engine, and was coded and distributed as uncompiled Applesoft BASIC. Grigsby developed both games while working full-time for the United States Department of Defense.

Grigsby followed Bomb Alley with North Atlantic '86 in 1983 using the same engine.

== Gameplay ==
Each turn represented twelve hours, with ground and air combat taking place only during daytime turns.

Grigsby expanded the game from Guadalcanal Campaign with many new features, such as transport aircraft, torpedo boats, and the ability to use paratroops once per game. Most important of all was the ability of aircraft to support ground troops in combat.

As in the previous game, an AI "player" was available for one side only, but this time it was the Allies. The Axis had to have a human player. Also in contrast, there were only three scenarios instead of six, and the "long" campaign game ran less than three months.

Both sides faced the problem of how to keep their forces supplied, primarily with ship convoys, and how best to disrupt the other side's convoys. Where to base the fighters and bombers, which had been obvious in Guadalcanal Campaign, was now a challenge. Control of the air over Africa had to be traded off with the air battles over Malta.

== Development ==
Bomb Alley was designed by Gary Grigsby, following his debut title Guadalcanal Campaign in 1982. As with his first game, he developed Bomb Alley in his spare time while working in a civil service position.

== Reception ==
Rich Sutton of Video Games wrote that he "highly recommended [Bomb Alley] for the intermediate player".

The game's greatest weakness was the scoring system, which strongly favored the British. While Malta and Tobruk were worth 500 points each if the Allies held them, the Axis received only 200 points each for capturing them. The only high-value target for the Axis was capturing Alexandria itself. This meant the Axis had to win decisively or not at all.

Another problem was the limited types of aircraft available. Historically, the Mediterranean Theatre had a wide mix of German, Italian, British, and American bombers and fighters. Grigsby's system accommodated only one fighter type for each side, and only a few bomber types. A 1983 review in Computer Gaming World complained about this lack of detail, which may have contributed to Bomb Alley selling less well than Guadalcanal Campaign. A 1993 survey in the magazine of wargames gave the game one-plus stars out of five.

There were some bugs in the source code, but they did not interfere with the playability of the game. A line of code accidentally carried over from Guadalcanal Campaign halved the accuracy of the British torpedo bombers from what the manual said. However, they were still able to inflict serious losses on Axis ships. Another bug prevented the major Allied base at Gibraltar from receiving additional supplies, but there was a stockpile at the start large enough to last through most games.
