= Canadian Football 2017 =

2017 football video game

- Developer: Canuck Play Inc.
- Publisher: Canuck Play Inc.
- Designer: David Winter
- Engine: Unity
- Platforms: Windows, Xbox One
- Release: NA: July 26, 2017
- Genre: Sports

Canadian Football 2017 is a gridiron football video game developed by Canuck Play. The game uses Canadian football rules, but is not officially licensed by either the Canadian Football League (CFL) or the players' association.

The game was released on July 26, 2017 on Windows and Xbox One. A controller is required to play on Windows.

== Gameplay ==
The game's Steam page describes it as "Fast, explosive offensive action, we have it all in our Canadian gridiron simulation title that brings to fans everything they love about how Canucks have been playing the game for more than 100 years. That means 12 players, 3 downs, 20 seconds, and no fair catch eh."

- Complete professional Canadian football rule set.
- Playable with an optional subset of American football rules.
- Quick Season mode that tracks full team and individual player statistics.
- Practice mode.
- All nine Canadian football cities each with their own unique stadium.
- Includes template files for creating 10, 16, and 32 team leagues.
- Gamepad control: Xbox controller for Windows highly recommended but also compatible with PlayStation controllers by mirroring Xbox controls. Mouse support only in the Play Designer.
- Full 3D DirectX 11 graphics. The game can be set to play with DirectX9 mode for older machines but with some visual differences.
- Physics based tackles and ball mechanics.
- Full motion capture animation.
- Single or Multiplayer (using Steam Remote Play).

== Development ==
The game was made Peterborough, Ontario-based Canuck Play, a team led by David Winter, a former EA Sports developer previously behind Maximum Football and CFL Football '99. Winter noted the game was "essentially a solo project" outside of him hiring an artist to create the player models. Canuck Play also brought in players from local junior football team to record animations via motion capture.

Winter received the support of Microsoft and the city of Peterborough for the game. Although Winter hoped to get the rights to the CFL and its teams, the league was reluctant to commit to the project while he was unable to secure a $500,000 venture capital investment for it. As a result, Canadian Football 2017 was developed without the license and on Winter's own funding.
