= Panzer Command (board game) =

Panzer Command is a board wargame released by Victory Games in 1984. The game is a tactical level game depicting armoured operations south of Stalingrad in the winter of 1942–43.

== Design ==
The game was designed by Eric Lee Smith to be played by two players. The game was a standard hex map and counter system.

== Description ==
The box copy reads in part:

Panzer Command is a tactical level simulation of armored combat, recreating the battles that raged across the steppes of the Soviet Union during the middle years of World War II. Each of two players commands the 40 to 60 company-sized units of a German armored division or Soviet tank corps, maneuvering forces across treacherous terrain to engage the enemy in a life or death struggle. The challenge of battlefield command is yours in the thought-provoking, exciting game experience of Panzer Command.

The game introduced a chit-draw initiative system whereby each player could activate one formation (regiment / brigade) at a time. This led to an unpredictable order to each game turn. This mechanic is widely used in wargames today.

== Trivia ==
- Matrix Games released a tactical wargame for the PC called Panzer Command in June 2006, which also depicts armoured combat south of Stalingrad in 1942–43.
