= East Front (video game) =

1997 computer wargame

- Developer: TalonSoft
- Publisher: TalonSoft
- Designers: Robert McNamara, Jim Rose
- Platform: Windows
- Release: NA: October 30, 1997; EU: 1997
- Genre: Computer wargame
- Modes: Single-player, multiplayer

East Front is a 1997 computer wargame developed and published by TalonSoft.

East Front was TalonSoft's most commercially successful game by early 1999, with sales near 90,000 units. It began the Campaign series, the successor to TalonSoft's Battleground franchise, and was followed by West Front, East Front II, Rising Sun and Divided Ground.

== Gameplay ==
East Front is a turn-based computer wargame that simulates the Eastern Front of World War II.

== Development ==
East Front was the first game developed on TalonSoft's Campaign game engine. It was announced in 1996 for a late-1997 release.

== Reception ==
Reception

Review scores
Publication	Score
Computer Games Strategy Plus	2.5/5
Computer Gaming World	3/5
PC Gamer (US)	78%

According to TalonSoft head Jim Rose, East Front was the company's biggest commercial success by early 1999. Its sales neared 90,000 units by that time. By February 2000, the overall Campaign series had achieved global sales above 250,000 copies.

William R. Trotter of PC Gamer US called East Front "a shaky start for TalonSoft's new line, but a must-have game for any Russian Front fan."

== Legacy ==
The first game in the Campaign series, East Front was followed by West Front (1998), East Front II: The Russian Front (1999), Rising Sun (2000) and Divided Ground: Middle East Conflict 1948–1973 (2001).
