= Russian Front =

Russian Front may refer to:

== War fronts ==
- Eastern Front (World War I)
- Eastern Front (World War II)

== Games ==
- East Front II: The Russian Front, a 1999 video game
- Close Combat III: The Russian Front, a 1999 video game
- Russian Front, a mod for the 1998 video game Half-Life
- Russian Front, a 1985 board game published by Avalon Hill
- No Retreat: The Russian Front, a board game published by GMT Games
- The Last Crusade: The Russian Front, an expansion pack to the collectible card game The Last Crusade

== Other media ==
- "Russian Front", a song by Strawbs from the album Déjà Fou

== See also ==
- Eastern Front (disambiguation)
