= Guadalcanal Campaign (video game) =

1982 video game

- Publisher: Strategic Simulations
- Platform: Apple II
- Release: 1982
- Genre: Computer wargame
- Modes: Single player, multiplayer

Guadalcanal Campaign is a computer wargame developed by Gary Grigsby and published in 1982 by Strategic Simulations. It was Grigsby's first published game and has been cited as the first monster wargame made for computers.

Guadalcanal Campaign was a commercial and critical success that helped establish Grigsby as a computer wargame designer. Grigsby followed it with Bomb Alley. He released 23 games with Strategic Simulations by 1996.

== Gameplay ==
The player plans their attack on the overhead map.

Guadalcanal Campaign is a computer wargame that simulates the Solomon Islands campaign of World War II.

== Development ==
Guadalcanal Campaign was the first game released by designer Gary Grigsby. He recalled beginning development in December 1981. In early 1982, while phoning Strategic Simulations' hotline about its game Torpedo Fire, he got into a conversation with company head Joel Billings that led to an offer to publish Guadalcanal Campaign. Grigsby said that he had "nearly completed a crude working version" by the time that he talked to Billings. Grigsby developed the game in his spare time at night while working a day job at the United States Department of Defense, an arrangement he called "incredibly hard". He later said that he had made "a lot of little fragments of games" before Guadalcanal Campaign, but that it was the first full project he had undertaken. Guadalcanal Campaign was released in 1982, after roughly 8 months of work.

== Reception ==
Guadalcanal Campaign was a commercial success. According to Craig Ritchie of Retro Gamer, it sold roughly 3,500 copies, which he called "an outstanding figure for such a niche market".

Richard Charles Karr reviewed the game for Computer Gaming World, and stated that "It is this writer's opinion that Guadalcanal Campaign is the best historical simulation (and one of their best games) from SSI to date. The essential aspects of historicity and playability are well-matched, with easy accessibility of gaming information, a well-organized set of rules, and good research combining to provide for a game that will keep you at your computer for days at a time." Rich Sutton of Video Games called it "one of the best simulations available for beginner and expert alike".

== Legacy ==
Guadalcanal Campaign has been cited by Computer Gaming World, Electronic Games and author Rusel DeMaria as the first monster wargame released for computers. According to Retro Gamer, it "set the standard for a long line of award-winning wargames to come." It helped to establish both Grigsby and SSI in the game industry; Grigsby himself went on to be one of the computer wargame genre's most respected contributors. He continued his relationship with SSI; by 1996, he had worked with the company on 23 games. In 2001, he co-founded the studio 2 by 3 Games with SSI's Joel Billings and Keith Brors, where they continued to work together on wargames such as War in the Pacific and Gary Grigsby's World at War.
