= Steel Panthers III: Brigade Command 1939–1999 =

1997 video game

- Developer: Strategic Simulations
- Publisher: Strategic Simulations
- Producer: Joel Billings
- Designers: Keith Brors; Gary Grigsby
- Programmers: Keith Brors; Gary Grigsby
- Artist: Maurie Manning
- Composer: The Samsara Project
- Series: Steel Panthers
- Platforms: MS-DOS, Windows
- Release: November 26, 1997
- Genre: Tactical wargame
- Modes: Single-player, multiplayer

Steel Panthers III: Brigade Command 1939–1999 is a computer wargame developed and published by Strategic Simulations It was released in 1997 for MS-DOS and Windows. It is the third game in the Steel Panthers series, following Steel Panthers (1995) and Steel Panthers II: Modern Battles (1996). Like its predecessors, it was designed by Gary Grigsby and Keith Brors.

== Gameplay ==
Steel Panthers III is a wargame that simulates combat scenarios around the world between 1939 and 1999. The game covers six primary conflicts—such as the North African campaign and Vietnam War—across 40 individual scenarios. A map editor enables the player to create custom scenarios.

== Development ==
Steel Panthers III was designed by Gary Grigsby and Keith Brors. The game reuses the game engine from Steel Panthers II: Modern Battles, and was developed exclusively for MS-DOS. CNET Gamecenter noted that it would be "probably one of the last DOS-only games we'll see". It released on November 26, 1997.

== Reception ==
Reception

Review scores
Publication	Score
Computer Games Strategy Plus	4/5
Computer Gaming World	3/5
PC Gamer (US)	79%
CNET Gamecenter	9/10

T. Liam McDonald of PC Gamer US enjoyed Steel Panthers III but considered it "a missed opportunity", as it did not significantly build on its predecessors. In Computer Gaming World, Jim Cobb concurred: "Steel III is not anywhere near the definitive wargaming statements made by Steel I or II", he wrote. Writing for Computer Games Strategy Plus, Richard Lechowich was more positive, arguing that the game "continues the excellent system begun in the earlier games and builds on that foundation."

In its 1997 game of the year awards, CNET Gamecenter nominated Steel Panthers III in its "Strategy/War" category, but the prize ultimately went to Age of Empires. The site's editors called Steel Panthers III "one of the best war games running on any operating system."

== Aftermath ==
Following Steel Panthers III, Gary Grigsby and Keith Brors entered a contract to create several new projects for the wargame company TalonSoft. At the same time, GameSpot's Alan Dunkin reported in January 1998 that the two were working on new Steel Panthers titles for Strategic Simulations, beginning with an add-on for Steel Panthers III. A fourth Steel Panthers game, programmed for Windows 95, was also in production. The add-on was soon announced as Steel Panthers III: Brigade Command Campaign Disk, which included a multiplayer mode with Windows 95 support.
