= Objective: Kursk =

1984 video game

- Developer: Strategic Simulations
- Publisher: Strategic Simulations
- Designer: Gary Grigsby
- Platforms: Apple II, Atari 8-bit
- Release: 1984
- Genre: Wargame
- Modes: Single-player, multiplayer

Objective: Kursk is a 1984 computer wargame designed by Gary Grigsby and released by Strategic Simulations in 1984.

== Gameplay ==
Objective: Kursk is a computer wargame that simulates the Battle of Kursk between German and Soviet forces during World War II. It supports both single-player and two-player modes. The player controls the German side against the Soviets in the single-player mode.

== Release ==
Objective: Kursk was published by Strategic Simulations alongside 50 Mission Crush, which also covers World War II. It was designed by Gary Grigsby, and was among the three computer wargames he released in 1984, alongside War in Russia and Reforger '88. It was made with the same game engine and mechanics that Grigsby employed in Reforger. Objective: Kursk was released for the Apple II and Atari 8-bit computers.

== Reception ==
Reception

Review scores
Publication	Score
Page 6	2.5/5
Jeux et Stratégie	3/5
Tilt	4/5

Reviewing Objective: Kursk for Electronic Games, Neil Shapiro called it "a fine historical simulation". However, he considered it particularly dry, and "lack[ing] in a subjective 'feel' of fluidity, control and understandable challenge that I personally look for when I feel like gaming". In Antic, Dr. John F. Stanoch praised the recreation of the Battle of Kursk, but noted that "the game is long and might become tedious for some players."

In a Page 6 survey of wargames for Atari computers, writer M. Evan Brooks placed Objective: Kursk in the "moribund" category. While he found it "extremely detailed", he argued that the end result was "bland" and hampered by a cumbersome interface. A wargame survey from the French magazine Jeux & Stratégie declared, "More accessible than Reforger '88 or War in Russia, Objective: Kursk is still for real wargamers." Tilt's 1986 wargame survey was also positive toward the game.
