= Mech Brigade =

1985 video game

- Developer: Strategic Simulations
- Publisher: Strategic Simulations
- Designer: Gary Grigsby
- Platforms: Apple II, Atari 8-bit, Commodore 64, MS-DOS
- Release: 1985
- Genre: Computer wargame
- Modes: Single-player, multiplayer

Mech Brigade is a computer wargame published by Strategic Simulations in 1985. It was designed by Gary Grigsby, and is a follow-up to his earlier Kampfgruppe.

== Gameplay ==
Mech Brigade is a computer wargame that simulates a hypothetical conflict between NATO and the nations of the Warsaw Pact.

== Development ==
Mech Brigade was designed by Gary Grigsby. It serves as a follow-up to his title Kampfgruppe, a World War II simulation. Mech Brigade was designed to bring the system into a modern warfare context. He launched both games in 1985, the same year he debuted U.S.A.A.F. - United States Army Air Force.

== Reception ==
Reception

Review score
Publication	Score
Computer Play	7.2/10

Author Rusel DeMaria later reported that Mech Brigade was "superior in design but inferior in sales" to Kampfgruppe.

Jay Selover reviewed the game for Computer Gaming World, and stated that "The addition of anti-tank guided missiles (ATGM's), combat helicopters, and all the other trappings of modern combat make Mech Brigade a much more dangerous place to take a Sunday stroll." In Antic, Dr. John Stanoch opined that Mech Brigade is "certainly not a game for beginners".

In his 1989 computer wargame survey, J. L. Miller of Computer Play offered Mech Brigade a generally positive score but found that the "weapons systems seem to lack the lethality that they in fact possess".

As it had with Kampfgruppe, Computer Gaming World inducted Mech Brigade into its Hall of Fame. The magazine's Alan Emrich later said that Mech Brigade was "the pre-eminent tank game until the arrival of M-1 Tank Platoon."
