= Eastern campaign =

Eastern campaign may refer to:

- Eastern Expedition, a 19th-century conflict in China
- First Eastern Campaign, an 1895 military campaign in Cuba
- Second Eastern Campaign, an 1898 military campaign in Cuba
- Eastern Syria campaign, a 2017 military operation in the Syrian Civil War
- Eastern Uganda campaign, a variety of campaigns in Uganda
- Eastern Ukraine campaign, a major theatre of the Russian invasion of Ukraine

== See also ==
- Eastern Front (disambiguation)
