= Reforger '88 =

1984 video game

- Developer: Strategic Simulations
- Publisher: Strategic Simulations
- Designer: Gary Grigsby
- Platforms: Apple II, Atari 8-bit
- Release: 1984
- Genre: Computer wargame

Reforger '88 is a computer wargame designed by Gary Grigsby and published by Strategic Simulations in 1984. It takes place in a near-future setting and covers a hypothetical conflict between NATO and Warsaw Pact nations.

== Gameplay ==
Reforger '88 is a computer wargame that simulates the hypothetical invasion of West Germany by the Warsaw Pact alliance, met with retaliation by NATO forces.

== Development ==
Reforger '88 was designed by Gary Grigsby and released in 1984, the same year he launched Objective: Kursk and War in Russia. Reforger was built with the game engine and mechanics from Kursk.

== Reception ==
Reception

Review scores
Publication	Score
Computer Play	6.08/10
Current Notes	2.5/5

Jasper Sylvester reviewed the game for Computer Gaming World, and stated that "Reforger '88 is an excellent game using a free-flowing and user-friendly system which is satisfying to play from the initial boot to the last turn of battle. It is the product of an incredible amount of research and even a perusal of the list of weapon systems makes some Pentagon budget considerations seem clearer."

In a 1985 survey of computer wargames for Current Notes, M. Evan Brooks called Reforger '88 a flawed title that "suffer[s] from the same defects as Objective: Kursk", although he considered it "somewhat more successful". In his similar 1989 survey, J. L. Miller of Computer Play called Reforger "somewhat dated" and offered it a middling score.
