= Panzer Strike =

1988 video game

- Developer(s): Strategic Simulations
- Publisher(s): Strategic Simulations
- Designer(s): Gary Grigsby
- Platform(s): Apple II, Commodore 64
- Release: NA: 1988
- Genre(s): Computer wargame

Panzer Strike is a 1988 tactical wargame that simulates small unit actions during World War II. It was made for Apple II and Commodore 64 and was released by Strategic Simulations.

Panzer Strike spawned the follow-up titles Typhoon of Steel and Overrun!, which reuse the game's engine and mechanics. In 1995, Grigsby released Steel Panthers to revisit design concepts from his earlier titles like Panzer Strike.

== Gameplay ==
Panzer Strike is a computer wargame that simulates combat scenarios during World War II, ranging from the Western and Eastern fronts to the North African campaign. It takes place at a small scale: one counter is used to represent one vehicle, and turns represent single minutes. The game included an editor as well as over 250 weapon types; single scenarios can last up to two hours. The game comes on two double-sided diskettes, and includes a campaign editor along with scenarios of three fronts of the war: East, West and North Africa.

== Development ==
Panzer Strike was designed by Gary Grigsby and was released in 1988, the same year he debuted Typhoon of Steel.

== Reception ==
Reception

Review score
Publication	Score
Computer Play	8.38/10

In his 1989 computer wargame survey, J. L. Miller of Computer Play offered Panzer Strike a positive score and wrote, "Historically accurate and design-your-own scenarios offer a lesson in World War II tactics." A review in Computer Gaming World compared the game favorably to Avalon Hill's Squad Leader game, noting both as small unit combat games with interesting detail and variety. The scenario editor was described as able to quickly create maps to play. Additionally, carrying over units from scenario to scenario in the Campaign mode was described as the best part of the game. Complaints were directed at the lack of US units and the sometimes unintelligible terrain icons. The magazine would later award it "Strategy Game of the Year" for 1988. A 1993 survey in the magazine of wargames gave the game two stars out of five, criticizing the slow play and lack of a battlefield view.

== Legacy ==
Gary Grigsby modified and reused Panzer Strike's game engine and mechanics for his later titles Typhoon of Steel (1988) and Overrun! (1989). According to Terry Coleman of Computer Gaming World, Grigsby later conceived his game Steel Panthers as a way to revisit and update earlier wargame designs such as Panzer Strike. In 1992, Grigsby had publicly discussed his plan to make another tactical wargame "similar in scope to Panzer Strike", which dealt with ground-based conflicts in Europe during World War II. He told Electronic Games at the time that he was "waiting on a new graphics system from SSI" before he began.
