= CFL Football '99 =

1999 video game

- Developer: Wintervalley Software
- Publisher: Canadian Digital Entertainment
- Platform: Windows
- Genre: Sports

CFL Football '99 is a gridiron football video game developed by Victoria, British Columbia-based entrepreneur David Winter. It is an officially licensed product of the Canadian Football League (CFL) and the Canadian Football League Players Association. The title is best known for being the only video game based on the CFL to date.

Designer David Winter originally specialized in administrative and industrial applications, doing business through his private firm Wintervalley Software. He obtained the rights to the CFL brand in 1998 and launched a new company, CDE (Canadian Digital Entertainment Inc.), for the purpose of marketing CFL Football '99. Part of the game's development was outsourced to American middleware provider Phantom Reality.

== Description ==
CFL Football '99 was not a fast-paced, console-style title; rather, it was a simulation in the mold of Sierra's Front Page Sports Football franchise. Similar to the contemporary Front Page Sports Football, it mostly used 2D graphics.

== Reception ==
Reception of the game was mixed. Casual players were disappointed as they were hoping for a more mainstream take on Canadian football. Simulation veterans were eager to recognize the game's potential, but most accepted the fact that it could not rival established names in the same subgenre.

== Follow-ups ==
Winter started working on a second installment in his CFL series, this time using a 3D graphics engine. But over the course of development, he decided to broaden the game's scope by putting the emphasis on customization instead of the CFL licence. Official CFL content was scrapped in favour of more options: the game allowed the player to pick his own ruleset and field size from various gridiron football codes. In 2001, the project was rechristened Maximum-Football and it eventually secured U.S. distribution.

Maximum-Football was released in 2006 after a protracted development cycle. In earlier press releases, the developer hinted that Maximum-Football would kick-start a franchise of sports games with a common focus on flexibility and management, such as Maximum Hockey, Maximum Baseball, and Maximum Lacrosse. For logistic reasons, none of the planned spin-offs were released. However, Maximum Football 2.0 shipped in 2007 and maintains a dedicated fanbase. The game can still be played using Canadian football rules.

A 2012 Kotaku article revealed that a team of Electronic Arts developers had prototyped a CFL conversion of EA Sports NCAA Football for internal purposes. Despite talks between Canadian-born EA executive Cam Weber and then-CFL commissioner Mark Cohon, the CFL mode never made it to any actual release.

In March 2016 it was announced that work had begun on a console based game called Canadian Football 2017. Development started in early December 2015 and was released in July 2017 for Microsoft Windows and Xbox One. The game was being developed with the Unity 5.5 game engine via Microsoft's Indiependent Development Program (which provides development kits and software licenses) and supported by the Peterborough Innovation Cluster and Cube. The game did not have the CFL licence.
