= Warship (video game) =

1986 video game

- Publisher: Strategic Simulations
- Designer: Gary Grigsby
- Platforms: Apple II, Atari 8-bit, Atari ST, Commodore 64
- Release: 1986
- Genre: Computer wargame
- Modes: Single-player, multiplayer

Warship is a 1986 computer wargame designed by Gary Grigsby and published by Strategic Simulations. It covers naval conflict during the Pacific War.

In 1987, Grigsby followed Warship with Battle Cruiser, which reuses the gameplay system but expands the scope to cover both World War I and World War II.

== Gameplay ==
Warship is a computer wargame that simulates Asiatic-Pacific Theater naval surface combat during World War II. It is set between 1941 and 1945, and focuses on the conflict between Imperial Japan and the United Kingdom, United States and Netherlands. The game contains a "construction kit" that allows the player to create custom scenarios.

== Development ==
Warship was designed by Gary Grigsby and was released in 1986, the same year he launched Battle Group. It was published by Strategic Simulations.

== Reception ==
Reception

Review scores
Publication	Score
Computer Play	6.4/10
Page 6	3/5

Bob Proctor reviewed the game for Computer Gaming World, and stated that "there's not much wrong with this game. The subject may not be of interest to everyone but this game recreates the feel of nighttime surface combat better than any other game of any kind."

In a 1988 Page 6 survey of wargames for Atari computers, writer M. Evan Brooks found that Warship's poor documentation limited its appeal "to true naval aficionados and not to those with a marginal interest." In his similar 1989 computer wargame survey, J. L. Miller of Computer Play called the game "historically accurate and recommended for the naval buff."

== Sequel ==
Gary Grigsby designed a sequel to Warship entitled Battle Cruiser (1987), which carries over large parts of Warship's system but covers both World War II and World War I.
