= Western Front: The Liberation of Europe 1944–1945 =

1991 video game

- Developer(s): Strategic Simulations
- Publisher(s): Strategic Simulations
- Designer(s): Gary Grigsby
- Platform(s): MS-DOS
- Release: 1991
- Genre(s): Computer wargame

Western Front: The Liberation of Europe 1944–1945 is a 1991 computer wargame for MS-DOS developed and published by Strategic Simulations. It was designed by Gary Grigsby.

== Gameplay ==
Western Front is a computer wargame that simulates the Western Front of World War II. Its scope covers the conflict starting from the lead-up to the Normandy landings, and concludes with the fall of Germany to the Allies.

== Development ==
Western Front was designed by Gary Grigsby as a follow-up to his 1990 wargame Second Front: Germany Turns East, which had covered the Eastern Front. He reused the earlier title's game engine, with upgrades such as mouse support. Published by Strategic Simulations, the game was released in 1991.

== Reception ==
In a positive review, Computer Gaming World's Alan Emrich wrote, "Because Mr. Grigsby often sets the standards for computer wargames, one seldom sees his games in terms of revolutionary design breakthroughs, but rather as evolutionary advances in computer wargaming's 'state of the art.' Western Front is another such advance." William R. Trotter of Game Players PC Entertainment also enjoyed the game, calling it "a must-have program" for enthusiasts of the Western Front of World War II. However, he considered it slightly inferior to its predecessor Second Front. Writing for Computer Games Strategy Plus, Brian Walker called Western Front "a potentially great game" hampered by cost-cutting measures, particularly with regard to its documentation.

== See also ==
- West Front
