= Fred Chappell =

American poet (1936–2024)

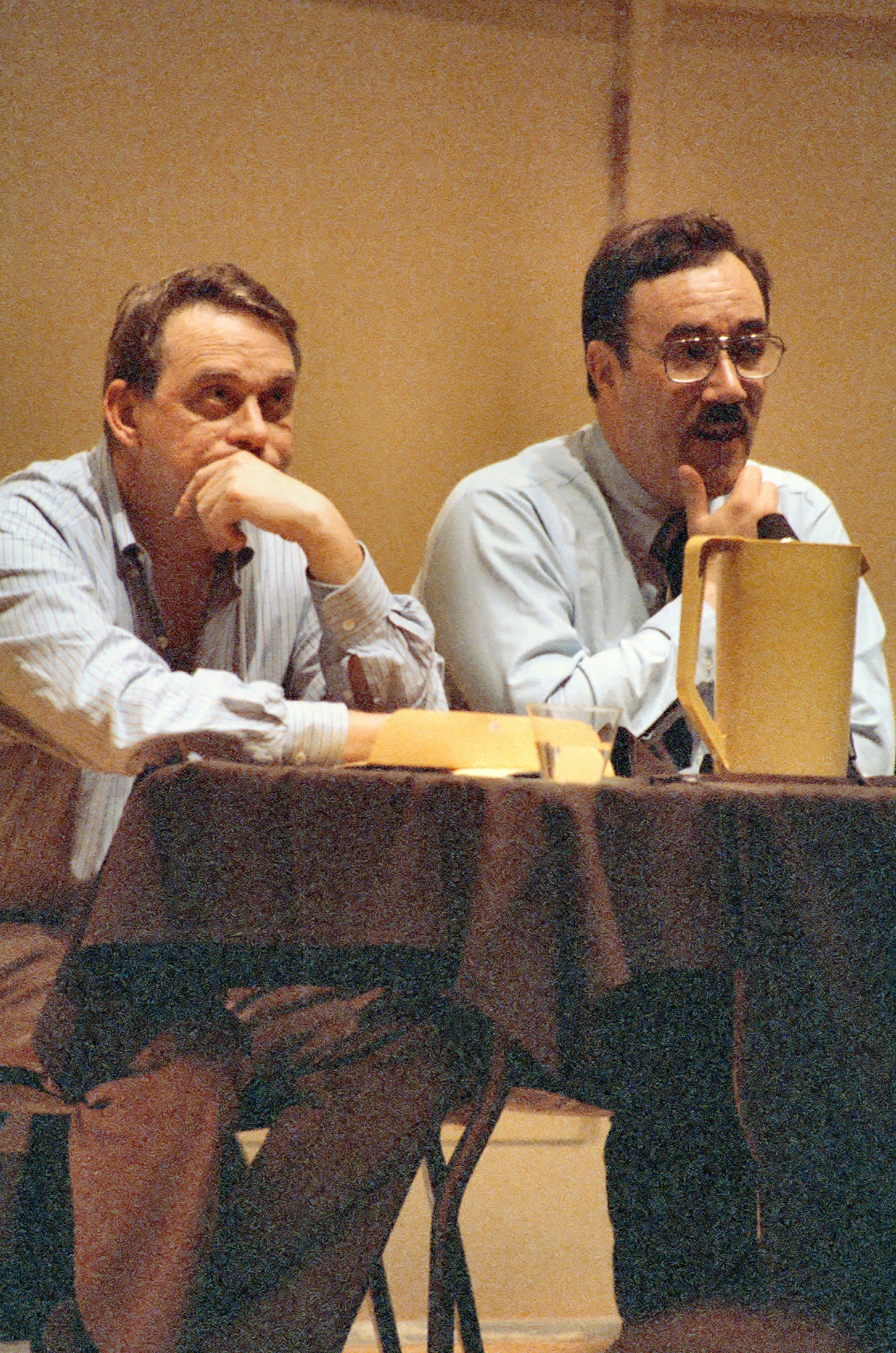
- Chappell (left) with Les Daniels in 1990
- Born: May 28, 1936; Canton, North Carolina, U.S.
- Died: January 4, 2024 (aged 87); Greensboro, North Carolina, U.S.
- Occupations: Writer; poet; professor
- Writing career
- Genres: Southern Gothic; horror fiction; weird fiction

Fred Davis Chappell (May 28, 1936 – January 4, 2024) was an author and poet. He was an English professor for 40 years (1964–2004) at the University of North Carolina at Greensboro. He was the Poet Laureate of North Carolina from 1997 to 2002. He attended Duke University.

Chappell's 1968 novel Dagon, which was named the Best Foreign Book of the Year by the Académie française, is a recasting of a Cthulhu Mythos horror story as a psychologically realistic Southern Gothic. The Poetry Foundation describes both his poetry and prose as investigating the Southern experience by "drawing on childhood memories and the character of his home region." His first collection of poetry, The World Between the Eyes, won the Roanoke-Chowan Poetry Cup for 1971. His earliest science fiction was published in Robert Silverberg's fanzine Spaceship in 1952 and 1953.

His literary awards include the Aiken Taylor Award for Modern American Poetry, the Prix du Meilleur Livre Étranger, the Bollingen Prize, and the T. S. Eliot Award for Creative Writing. He won two World Fantasy Awards for short fiction. His short story "The Somewhere Doors" from the More Shapes Than One collection won in 1992 and The Lodger won in 1994. In 2003 he was given the lifetime achievement award from the Southeastern SF Achievement Awards. He also received the O. Max Gardner Award for his teaching career.

Chappell died in Greensboro, North Carolina on January 4, 2024, at the age of 87.

== Bibliography ==
=== Books ===
==== Poetry ====
- Awakening to music. Briarpatch Press. 1979.
- Backsass, LSU Press, 2004.
- Bloodfire: A Poem, LSU Press, 1978.
- C, LSU Press, 1993.
- Castle Tzingal, LSU Press, 1984.
- Driftlake: A Lieder Cycle, Iron Mountain Press, 1981.
- Earthsleep: A Poem, LSU Press, 1980.
- Familiars, LSU Press, 2014.
- Family Gathering, LSU Press, 2000.
- First and Last Words, LSU Press, 1989.
- The Man Twice Married by Fire, Unicorn Press, 1975.
- Midquest: A Poem (contains "River: A Poem", "Bloodfire: A Poem", "Windmountain: A Poem", and "Earthsleep: A Poem"), LSU Press, 1981.
- River: A Poem, LSU Press, 1975.
- Shadow Box: Poems, :Louisiana State University Press, 2009
- Source, LSU Press, 1986.
- Spring Garden: New and Selected Poems, LSU Press, 1995.
- Wind Mountain: A Poem, LSU Press, 1979.
- The World Between the Eyes, LSU Press, 1971.

==== Fiction ====
- A Shadow All of Light, Tor Books, 2016
- Ancestors and others : new and selected stories. St Martin's. 2009. ISBN 9780312561673.
- Dagon, Harcourt, 1968, reprinted, St. Martin's, 1986. Reissued, Boson Books, 2002
- The Gaudy Place
- The Inkling Reprinted LSU Press 1998.
- It Is Time, Lord Reprint LSU Press 1996.
- Moments of Light
- More Shapes Than One, 1991

The Kirkman Tetralogy:

- I Am One of You Forever, LSU Press, 1985
- Brighten the Corner Where You Are, St. Martin's, 1989
- Farewell, I'm Bound to Leave You
- Look Back All the Green Valley

==== Other ====
- The Fred Chappell Reader, St. Martin's, 1987.
- Plow Naked: Selected Writings on Poetry, University of Michigan Press, 1993.
- A Way of Happening: Observations of Contemporary Poetry, Picador, 1998.

=== Short stories ===
- "The Adder" Deathrealm (Summer 1989)
- "Free Hand" Deathrealm (Spring 1990)
- "The Lodger" (1994 World Fantasy Award winner)
- "The Somewhere Doors" (1992 World Fantasy Award winner)
- Stories about Falco the Shadow Master's Apprentice.
1. "Creeper Shadows" Cat Tales: Fantastic Feline Fiction (Wildside Press, Compilation 2008 by George H. Scithers(former editor of Weird Tales.): 135–175
2. "Dance of Shadows" Fantasy and Science Fiction 112/3 (March 2007): 6–37 & Year's Best Fantasy 8, (Jun 2008, ed. David G. Hartwell, Kathryn Cramer, publ. Tachyon Publications, 1-892391-76-7, 375pp, tp, anth)
3. "The Diamond Shadow" Fantasy and Science Fiction 113/4&5 (October/November 2007): 42–74
4. "Shadow of the Valley" Fantasy and Science Fiction 116/2 (February 2009): 5–40 &
5. "Thief of Shadows" Fantasy and Science Fiction 118/5&6 (May/June 2010): 50–75
6. "Maze of Shadows" Fantasy and Science Fiction 122/5&6 (May/June 2012): 69–135

=== Book reviews ===
Year	Review article	Work(s) reviewed
2008	Chappell, Fred (October–November 2008). "Curiosities". F&SF. 115 (4&5): 242.	Forbes, Esther (1954). Rainbow on the road.

== See also ==
- List of horror fiction authors
