= Overrun! =

1989 video game

- Publisher(s): Strategic Simulations
- Designer(s): Gary Grigsby
- Platform(s): Apple II, Amiga, Commodore 64
- Release: 1989
- Genre(s): Computer wargame

Overrun! is a 1989 computer wargame designed by Gary Grigsby and published by Strategic Simulations.

== Gameplay ==
Overrun! is a computer wargame that simulates historical and hypothetical conflicts from 1973 onward.

== Development ==
Overrun! was designed by Gary Grigsby and released in 1989. It is based on the game engine and mechanics of Grigsby's earlier Typhoon of Steel, itself adapted from his game Panzer Strike. Grigsby revised the system to support modern warfare scenarios; the previous games had been set during World War II.

== Reception ==
Reception

Review score
Publication	Score
Zzap!	80%

In Computer Gaming World, Buddy Knight wrote, "All things taken together, Overrun! gives you your money's worth. I would heartily recommend buying a copy." Erik Olson of Compute!'s Gazette was similarly positive toward the game: he dubbed it "possibly the most complex war game available for the 64" and "an excellent simulation". Zzap!'s Robin Hogg wrote that it "[s]lips up in the possibilities of modern combat but despite this [is] an extensive and very comprehensive wargame."
