= Starshatter =

2004 video game

- Developer: Destroyer Studios
- Publisher: Matrix Games
- Platform: Windows
- Release: NA: July 7, 2004
- Genre: Space flight simulator
- Mode: Single player

Starshatter is an independently developed space flight simulator by American developer Destroyer Studios. It is published by Matrix Games. In October 2006, a sequel, Starshatter: The Gathering Storm was released.
