= Chaco (board game) =

1973 board game

Ziplock bag cover illustration

Chaco, subtitled "Classical Infantry Warfare in the Thirties", is a board wargame published by Game Designers' Workshop (GDW) in 1973 that simulates the 20th-century Chaco War between Bolivia and Paraguay.

== Background ==
In 1932, Bolivia and Paraguay went to war over ownership of the arid northern part of the Gran Chaco region, thought to contain large oil reserves. Both sides had trouble moving soldiers and supplies to the remote desert; once there, soldiers spent more time searching for sources of water during the three-year war than fighting. Nicholas Palmer called it "an appalling bloodbath as First World War techniques were married to Second World War firepower."

== Description ==
Chaco is a two-player game played at a regimental level in which water resources are almost as important as combat. The issue of supply lines means that rivers and roads become important albeit narrow channels for troop movements; units moving forward in wide swathes is uncommon.

=== Components ===
The ziplock bag includes:

- 22" x 28" paper hex grid map of the Chaco Desert, scaled at 10 mi (16 km) per hex
- 380 die-cut counters
- 14-page rulebook
- various player aids

=== Gameplay ===
The game uses traditional "I Go, You Go" turns and simple rules, with several optional rules such as divisional patrols, rapid reaction reserves, human cost victory conditions, tanks, aircraft, anti-aircraft guns, and gunboats. Each player picks three optional rules they would like, and also chooses one rule that the opposing player cannot pick.

=== Scenarios ===
The game comes with a variety of short scenarios. One features the US Marines, played by a third player, who can intervene on behalf of either side or fight against both sides in an attempt to restore the pre-war boundaries.

=== Victory conditions ===
The victory conditions for each scenario involve geographical gains. However, if the "human cost" optional rule is used, a player can attain the needed geographical objectives but still lose if too many lives are lost.

== Publication history ==
Chaco, the first published wargame about the Chaco War, was designed by Marc Miller and was released as a ziplock-bag game by GDW in 1973 as one of their first products.

It remained one of the few wargames set in South America, joined by AWA's Operacao Littorio in 1976.

== Reception ==
In his 1977 book The Comprehensive Guide to Board Wargaming, Nicholas Palmer noted "The basic game is simple and brisk." He called the rule allowing one player to forbid the other player from choosing a certain optional rule "an interesting touch."

In the 1980 book The Best of Board Wargaming , Marcus Watney noted that "its great attraction lies in the strategic options open to players, and the interaction of those options." He concluded, "Lasting only six turns, this game is ideal for fleshing out a few hours at the end of a convention; the rules are quickly learnt, the game is challenging, and the situation is colourful."

In Issue 6 of Simulacrum, Brian Train noted that GDW was the first to publish a game about this obscure war, commenting that in its early days, GDW "was known for doing things a little bit differently [...] they would treat subjects that no one else would have considered touching." He called Chaco "a relatively simple game, but (designer) Marc Miller did his best to make an unusual and interesting design." Train called the scenario involving US Marines "odd."

Richard Berg called Chaco "a game well worth exploring", noting that "Between two equal players the game develops as a tense battle between the Paraguayan spearhead in the south and the Bolivian offensive in the north." He concluded "All in all, this is an exciting, well-made game that provides swift, tense play-action for any gamer interested in discovering the facts about the last major infantry clash in this century."

In Issue 1 of Fire & Movement, Raymond Lowe called Chaco "a fairly simple, straightforward game, which from the looks of the additional rules, has the capability of being a Latin version of 1914 [Avalon Hill, 1968]."

== Awards ==
Chaco was a finalist for a 1991 Charles S. Roberts Award in the category "Best Pre-World War II Board Game."

== Other reviews and commentary ==
- Panzerfaust No. 62
