= U.S.A.A.F. - United States Army Air Force =

1985 video game

- Developer: Strategic Simulations
- Publisher: Strategic Simulations
- Designer: Gary Grigsby
- Platforms: Apple II, Atari 8-bit, Commodore 64
- Release: 1985
- Genre: Computer wargame
- Modes: Single-player, multiplayer

U.S.A.A.F. - United States Army Air Force is a 1985 computer wargame designed by Gary Grigsby published by Strategic Simulations.

U.S.A.A.F. won positive reviews but sold poorly. In 1999, it received a spiritual successor under the name Battle of Britain, designed by Grigsby and Keith Brors and published by TalonSoft.

== Gameplay ==
U.S.A.A.F. - United States Army Air Force is a game in which the daylight bombing of World War II by the Americans against Germany is simulated.

== Development ==
U.S.A.A.F. was designed by Gary Grigsby and released in 1985, the same year he launched Kampfgruppe and Mech Brigade.

== Reception ==
Reception

Review scores
Publication	Score
Computer Play	8.6/10
Page 6	4.5/5

According to M. Evan Brooks of Computer Gaming World, U.S.A.A.F. sold poorly. He remarked in 1993, "Based upon its commercial success, it would appear that its fans are limited to this reviewer and the designer."

Jay Selover reviewed the game for Computer Gaming World, and stated that "it covers well what it sets out to do. As a study of the collapse of Germany's industrial capacity under the weight of American bombs, it is unsurpassed."

In a 1988 Page 6 survey of wargames for Atari computers, writer M. Evan Brooks called U.S.A.A.F. "highly recommended" and "a fascinating product". In a similar 1989 survey, J. L. Miller of Computer Play called the game "interesting and a real learning tool" and dubbed it a "recommended" title. In his 1993 survey, Brooks continued his praise for U.S.A.A.F. and upgraded it to a five-star score.

== Legacy ==
In 1995, Computer Gaming World reported that Gary Grigsby had been attempting to pitch "the idea of redoing USAAF for the IBM" to Strategic Simulations, without success. After departing Strategic Simulations for TalonSoft in 1997, Grigsby and his collaborator Keith Brors envisioned a semi-remake of U.S.A.A.F. under the title Battle of Britain. It marked the first time since U.S.A.A.F. that Grigsby had attempted an air-combat title.
