= Boson Books =

Independent American publisher

Boson Books was an independent publisher based in Raleigh, North Carolina. It was founded in 1994 by Nancy McAllister, President and Director of Acquisitions, and David McAllister, Vice President and Director of Technical Operations. The company publishes e-books and paperbacks; it also features a limited number of titles from The New South Company.

== History ==
Initially, Boson Books published acclaimed contemporary writers of American Southern literature, such as Fred Chappell and Kelly Cherry, named by Virginia governor Bob McDonnell in 2011 as the state's new poet laureate. Over time, the company published more broadly, including American and international authors of fiction, non-fiction, and drama. As of 2012, the company publishes 140 titles. From the time of its founding, Boson embraced emerging technologies such as e-books and participated in academic conferences of the IEEE and SIGDOC.

The company merged with Bitingduck Press in August 2012.

== Notable authors ==
Fred Chappell, poet and novelist

Kelly Cherry, poet and novelist

Phillip Gardner novelist and English faculty member at Francis Marion University

Leon Katz, dramatist and professor emeritus at Yale University

Robert Rodman, computer scientist and novelist at North Carolina State University

Steven Vivian, novelist and liberal nationalist social critic
