= Operation Barbarossa – The Struggle for Russia =

2009 strategy computer game

Operation Barbarossa - The Struggle for Russia
- Developer: Binary Evolution Studios
- Publishers: Matrix Games (English version), EuroVision (German version)
- Designers: Ronald Wendt and Ralf Zenker
- Platform: Windows
- Release: September 2009 (English version); February 2010 (German version)
- Genre: Turn-based strategy
- Modes: Single player, Multiplayer

Operation Barbarossa – The Struggle for Russia is a turn-based strategy computer game and the only release by Binary Evolution Studios, a small independent development team based in Nuremberg, Germany. The game depicts Operation Barbarossa in the Eastern Front theatre from 1941–1945. The gameplay is strongly influenced by Panzer General II and the graphics are displayed in a 3D environment using the OGRE Engine. It was developed from December 2006 to August 2009 (English version). In February 2010 a German version was released.

== Gameplay ==
=== Structure and content ===
In Operation Barbarossa – The Struggle for Russia, the player leads divisions of Germany, Romania or Russia through single scenarios or in campaigns, a string of scenarios each representing a specific battle on the Eastern Front. The campaigns are strictly historical.

The first campaign is a small tutorial campaign of four scenarios length.

The second campaign Operation Barbarossa consists of nine scenarios and takes place from June to December 1941.

The third campaign Great Patriotic War also contains nine scenarios and leads the player through the Russian campaign from the defence of Moscow 1941 to the conquest of Berlin in 1945.

A smaller fourth campaign includes the German Operation Blau with four scenarios and depicts the German battles for the Caucasus.

Since Service Pack 1 there is a fifth campaign Army Group North is about the fights from the Prussian borders towards Leningrad in 1941.

=== Basic rules ===
The maps are divided in hexfields that represent about five square kilometer. The game provides fog of war so enemy units have to be spotted by own units. Each unit has a certain attack and spotting range. Movement is influenced by weather and terrain.

=== Unit improvement ===
One of the most important differences to Panzer General is that special abilities can be added to units called upgrades in the game. In a campaign the players units are kept from scenario to scenario (the core unit principle) and improve by gaining experience. Anytime a unit reaches a certain amount of experience the player may upgrade the unit with special abilities. There 47 different updates depending on the unit type (e.g. an AA unit has different upgrades than a tank unit) such as e.g."Sharp Shooter" that increases the attack value against infantry units.

=== Trivia ===
- A leveleditor for making own scenarios is included.
- Since version 1.20 the nations Great Britain and Italy were added to support a user made Africa Mod.
- In March 2011 a tool called OBKonverter was released to make it easier to edit the game data.
- In July 2011 a free so called "Service Pack 1" with a new campaign, new scenarios and graphics was released.

== Reviews ==
GamersHall.de gives 7.6/10 - [Translated from German] There it is again, the good old Panzer General feeling. Operations looks a bit different and the gameplay is too, but it cannot deny its huge role model...I warmly recommend this to all lovers of Panzer General - you will not be disappointed!

EGC Games gives 67/100 - Highs:Unit customization mechanic, historic setting, unit variety. Lows: Linear limited campaigns, interface issues, sub-par graphics and audio, lack of cinematics, uninspiring gameplay.

Historynet recommended it, praising its intuitiveness and accessibility but noted that missions could be repetitive or simplistic.
