= Starshatter: The Gathering Storm =

2004 video game

- Developer(s): Destroyer Studios
- Publisher(s): Matrix Games
- Platform(s): Windows
- Release: WW: July 7, 2004
- Genre(s): Space combat simulator
- Mode(s): Single player

Starshatter: The Gathering Storm is a strategy-oriented space combat simulator created by Destroyer Studios and released on 7 July 2004. It is the sequel to Starshatter from 1997.

== Development history ==
Starshatter is a result of a project begun in 1997 by creator John DiCamillo as a fusion of many space sims available at the time.

Starshatter: The Gathering Storm is the 2004 remake of the original Starshatter from 1997, and the basic gameplay style is not much different, though both graphics and sound effects have been redone with full DirectX 9 support.

In September 2011, a post in the Starshatter Mods modding forum announced that Starshatter was being released as open source by the game's original creator.

== Gameplay ==
The main game revolves around four dynamic campaigns, which generate different events every time they are played, though major events appear in every playthrough to maintain the story. Each campaign begins with each side having a set number of ships and fighters, which are the deployed to perform missions.

The player is able to perform a wide variety of missions, such as patrols and interceptions. The missions are based on the current situation in the campaign. Missions take place mostly in space, though air missions often appear as enemy landing sites are discovered. The player also has a chance to join a ground-based squadron. Players destroyed in action may continue playing, despite their supposed "deaths".

As the player gains ranks, the ability to control capital ships becomes available. Ships range from small anti-fighter frigates to large carriers. There are usually fewer mission choices for capital ships, though earlier missions will have more unofficial objectives due to enemies between the player and the target. Eventually, the player can take control of the entire fleet, and command fighters and capital ships from a carrier. The game becomes purely tactical at this point.

== Background story ==
The story takes place in the distant future in a galaxy known as the "Blue Drift" region where the two colonial superpowers, The Terillian Alliance and the Marakan Hegemony are gridlocked in a cold war standoff that, following a civil war in a neighbouring neutral system, escalates into open conflict.

=== Storyline ===
The game story is divided into four story acts, and one tutorial act:

1. Live Fire. A series of scripted missions that shows the play the basics of gameplay, and the training of the player's character, who is a Terillian Alliance fighter pilot.
2. Highland. A civil war in the system of Solus, caused by the Dantari Separatists' desire to make their home system join the Marakan Hegemony. The Terillian Alliance intervenes, and subdues the fighters.
3. Shining fortress. The Maraken Hegemony invade core Terrilian alliance system. The Alliance push them back out and then aid the independent systems of Haiche and Borova. A precious artifact, the Borovan arcilith, goes missing.
4. Operation Firestorm. The Alliance counter invade Maraken Hegemony and use a pincer maneuver to invade. A new force emerges and the dantari are back.
5. Operation Nightfall. The Alliance are now looking for the Borovan Arcilith and invade core Hegemony systems looking for it.
