= Officers (video game) =

2008 video game

- Developer: 3A Games
- Publisher: Tri Synergy
- Platform: Windows
- Release: JP: 28 November 2008; EU: 29 May 2009; NA: 14 July 2009
- Genre: Real-time strategy

Officers (Russian: Офицеры) also known as Officers: World War 2 – Operation Overlord is a World War II real time strategy game. It was developed by GFI Russia and published by Peter Games in Europe, but separately received 3A Games as development team and publishing by Tri Synergy for American markets. It was released on 28 November 2008 in Japan, 29 May 2009 in Europe and released in the USA on 14 July 2009 for Windows. The game was released in Germany on 27 November 2008. Cover art of hard Officers copies varied by region.

A different and updated version of the game was released under the title Officers – The Matrix Edition by the American publisher Matrix Games on 17 November 2009.

== Gameplay & Plot ==
Officers is set in World War II and it allows players to take control of Allied forces which consist of US and British Armies in a fight for control over Western Europe against Germany through its single-player campaign beginning on the beaches of Normandy and ending in Germany itself. While the game features two additional factions, Germany and the Soviet Union, they do not possess their own story campaigns. In fact the Soviet Union, while prominently featured in trailers and cover art of the game, only appears as a multiplayer faction.

The game's maps can support up to 1500 units on each map and the map size can be anything up to 10 square miles (26 km^{2}). The game has over 50 units and it lets players use real military formations tactics with units. Furthermore, the game also contains a map editor which allows players to create custom scenarios. A multiplayer mode was implemented, but can only be accessed by playing either LAN or by directly connecting via IP to another player.

== Reception ==
Metacritic gave the game a 66/100 rating, based on 9 critic reviews. GameSpot gave the game a 5.5/10 rating, based on 8 critic reviews.

The game was praised for its large-scale combined-arms battles and tactical elements. Criticisms generally revolved around very poor stability with the 2008 release version, lack of dedicated multiplayer servers, map loading times, graphics and experimental composition of systems such as an experience-gain system whereas units die quickly.

== External links & References ==
- Gamespot review
- Metacritic review
- Official Website
