= Gary Grigsby's World at War =

2005 video game

- Developer: 2 by 3 Games
- Publisher: Matrix Games
- Platform: Windows
- Release: 2005
- Genre: Computer wargame
- Modes: Single-player, multiplayer

Gary Grigsby's World at War is a 2005 computer wargame developed by 2 by 3 Games and published by Matrix Games.

== Gameplay ==
Gary Grigsby's World at War is a grand strategy computer wargame that simulates conflict in World War II. There are five playable forces: China, Germany, Japan, the Soviet Union, and the Western Allies.

== Development ==
Gary Grigsby's World at War was announced in February 2004. 2 by 3 Games developed it concurrently with War in the Pacific, a significantly more complicated title. The company's Joel Billings noted that playtesting World at War was relatively simple: "In WitP the longest scenario can last around 1700 turns, while GGWaW's longest scenario lasts around 25 turns". It reached gold status in February 2005.

== Reception ==
Reception

Review scores
Publication	Score
Computer Games Magazine	2.5/5
Computer Gaming World	3.5/5
GameSpot	8.4/10
IGN	8.5/10
PC Zone	77/100

Gary Grigsby's World at War received "generally favorable reviews" from critics, according to Metacritic. Writer Greg Costikyan reported that the game had sold over 100,000 units by 2008.

In Computer Games Magazine, Bruce Geryk was unimpressed with World at War. He called it "a claustrophobic game in which there are only one or two ways to win ... and what matters is how carefully you count the combat factors needed to succeed." Anthony Holden of PC Zone was more positive, referring to it as "a superior piece of work" hampered by its inaccessibility to newcomers. Computer Gaming World's Di Luo concluded, "Even with its flaws, World at War is still a good choice for anyone looking for a fast-paced war game."

IGN presented World at War with its 2005 "Best Game No One Played" computer game award. The editors wrote that it "really shines in its excellent simulation of supply and logistics."

== A World Divided ==
In October 2006, World at War received a follow-up under the name Gary Grigsby's World at War: A World Divided. According to Joel Billings, it had begun as a patch but became ambitious enough for a full release; production began in January 2006. Among other updates, the game includes greater support for espionage and diplomacy, and enables a hypothetical conflict between the Soviet Union and Allied Western powers.

=== Reception ===
Reception

Review score
Publication	Score
IGN	7.9/10

Reviewing A World Divided for IGN, Steve Butts wrote, "Gamers who are looking for an introduction to high-level wargames should definitely consider giving this one a look." Wargamer's Al Berke called it "an excellent game" that "has a historical feel, but doesn't drown the players in a sea of detail."
