= Torpedo Fire =

1981 video game

- Publisher(s): Strategic Simulations
- Designer(s): John Lyon
- Platform(s): Apple II
- Release: 1981
- Genre(s): Turn-based strategy

Torpedo Fire is a turn-based submarine warfare game written by John Lyon for the Apple II and published by Strategic Simulations in 1981.

== Gameplay ==
Torpedo Fire is a game in which a submarine attack against a convoy is simulated. It is designed for two players, each turn covering 60 seconds of simulation time.

== Reception ==
Forrest Johnson reviewed Torpedo Fire in The Space Gamer No. 41. Johnson commented that "I cannot help but feel that Strategic Simulations has taken a wrong turn somewhere. I hope they find their way again soon." In Video Games, Rich Sutton said playability concerns meant that he "only recommended [Torpedo Fire] for the advanced player who desires the most accurate simulation on the market".

Bob Proctor, in a detailed analysis for Computer Gaming World, concluded "Although extremely well conceived, the concepts could have been better implemented. "

== Reviews ==
- Video Games

== Legacy ==
In early 1982, designer Gary Grigsby got his break in the game industry when he called Strategic Simulations' hotline with a question about Torpedo Fire, which he owned a copy of at the time. Getting into a conversation with company head Joel Billings paved the way for SSI's release of Grigsby's title Guadalcanal Campaign.
