= PureSim Baseball 2007 =

- Developer: PureSim Software Studios
- Publisher: Matrix Games
- Designer: Shaun Sullivan
- Platform: Windows
- Release: May 15, 2006
- Genres: Sports, Simulation
- Modes: Single player, Multiplayer

PureSim Baseball 2007 is a text-based computer baseball simulation published by Matrix Games. Originally developed by American independent game developer Shaun Sullivan, the first Matrix version was published as PureSim 2005 on 5 October 2005.

PureSim allows creation of a fantasy baseball world made up of either fictional players or real major league players imported from the Lahman Database. Leagues, called "associations" in PureSim, can be set up with as few as two teams to as many as fifty. Fully customizable, players may choose cities and nicknames and may even edit cities.

In March 2009, the game in its entirety was released as freeware by creator Shaun Sullivan, along with a message on the official website stating that he would like to continue developing the game in its free state.
