= Panzer Command =

Video game series

Panzer Command is a 3-D PC Tactical wargames series developed by American studio Koiosworks and published by Matrix Games for Windows.

== Game features ==
Panzer Command:...is (a) turn-based strategy game following the historical operations of war for both the German and Soviet sides of the Eastern front. (The game is played in turns, and each) turn consists of two 40 second phases, the first for orders, the second for reactions and targeting. (Panzer Command) also has a campaign for each side, which allows your core units to follow from scenario to scenario, possibly gaining experience and medals or losing experience if you fill them out with replacements. In addition, the game data is in XML format and is thus easily modable based on your preferences, the game art is also accessible and designed to allow user customization. A skirmish level will allow you to mix and match forces from the campaign in a fictional battle set in the same time frame.

The ability to edit unit data easily is not a feature usually associated with 3D tactical games.

== First title ==
The first title in the series was announced in February, 2006 and released on June 29, 2006. Operation Winter Storm depicts actions in the winter of 1942-43 and German relief operations south of Stalingrad. (See Operation Wintergewitter for information on the actual historical operation this game portrays.)

The game is intended to play on the same tactical level as Combat Mission, though is more closely related to Close Combat and Panzer General according to the developers.

3D World War II Tactical Combat! Germans and Soviets! A historical operation that had the opportunity for offense and defense for both sides in the midst of a strategic turning point for the Eastern Front. This game has some splendid visuals in addition to having historical stats and tactics. It also has a campaign for each side, which allows your core units to follow from scenario to scenario, possibly gaining experience and medals or losing experience if you fill them out with replacements. In addition, the game data is in XML format and is thus easily modable based on your preferences, the game art is also accessible and designed to allow user customization. A skirmish level will allow you to mix and match forces from the campaign in a fictional battle set in the same time frame.

== Second title ==
The second title, Panzer Command: Kharkov, was released in April 10, 2008.

== Third title ==
The third title, Panzer Command: Ostfront, was released in May 12, 2013.

== Trivia ==
- Victory Games released a board wargame called Panzer Command which was also a tactical game depicting armoured operations south of Stalingrad in the winter of 1942–43.
