= Steel Panthers (video game) =

1995 video game

- Developer: Strategic Simulations
- Publisher: Strategic Simulations
- Producer: Tom Wahl
- Designer: Gary Grigsby
- Programmers: Keith Brors; Gary Grigsby
- Composer: Rick Rhodes
- Series: Steel Panthers
- Platform: MS-DOS
- Release: 1995
- Genre: Tactical wargame
- Modes: Single-player, multiplayer

Steel Panthers is a computer wargame developed and published by Strategic Simulations. It was released in 1995 for MS-DOS. Designed by Gary Grigsby and Keith Brors, it simulates ground warfare during World War II, across the Western Front, Eastern Front and Pacific Theatre.

Steel Panthers was critically acclaimed and became a commercial hit, with sales above 130,000 units. Magazines such as Computer Gaming World and PC Gamer UK named it one of the greatest games of all time. It began the successful Steel Panthers series, and was followed by Steel Panthers II: Modern Battles and Steel Panthers III. In 2000, Matrix Games published an updated re-release of Steel Panthers entitled Steel Panthers: World at War.

== Gameplay ==
Players control individual tanks and vehicles from a top-down perspective, on a map with a hexagonal overlay. Infantry are mostly in squad/section sized units (8-12 men), but some units, like snipers, can be controlled individually. The whole force under a player's control is typically Battalion sized, but may be as small as a Platoon or Company, or as large as a Regiment/Brigade.

The game is turn-based and played against the AI or other humans via email or hotseat.

As with other tactical turn-based wargames, the game features realistic military control, with the smallest common units being squads, up to a brigade sized force. The player controls every available facet, from simple ammunition usage, to the morale, disposition, and command-chain of his troops.

The game features: packed single-battle scenarios and campaigns (either branched or linear), single battle generator, campaign generator, and long campaign generator.

== Development ==
Steel Panthers began production in May 1994, designed by Gary Grigsby for Strategic Simulations Inc. (SSI). According to Terry Coleman of Computer Gaming World, Grigsby conceived the game as a way to revisit and update his earlier wargame designs, particularly Kampfgruppe and Panzer Strike. In 1992, Grigsby had publicly discussed his plan to make another tactical wargame "similar in scope to Panzer Strike", which dealt with ground-based conflicts in Europe during World War II. He told Electronic Games at the time that he was "waiting on a new graphics system from SSI" before he began.

Coleman noted that Steel Panthers' creation was marked by "a considerable amount of tension". The success of SSI's Panzer General led the company to encourage Grigsby to simplify his design to reach a larger audience, while Grigsby "refused to compromise his standards of realism and detail".

== Reception ==
Reception

Review scores
Publication	Score
Computer Gaming World	5/5
PC Gamer (US)	90%
Electronic Entertainment	5/5
Computer Game Review	90/91/90

Steel Panthers was commercially successful. In 1996, Alex Dunne of Game Developer Magazine wrote that it had "been one of SSI's most popular games since it was released last September". Sales by that time had reached 85,000 units; they eventually surpassed 130,000 units. It was the biggest hit of Grigsby's career at the time, and Computer Games Magazine later dubbed it one of the most successful computer wargames ever. Steel Panthers was named the best wargame of 1995 by Computer Gaming World, PC Gamer US and Computer Games Strategy Plus. It also won Computer Game Review's 1995 "Military Sim of the Year" award, tied with Warcraft II: Tides of Darkness. The editors of PC Gamer US called it "easily one of the best tactical simulations ever developed for the PC."

Reviewing the game for Computer Games Strategy Plus, Peter Smith called Steel Panthers "a gem in the rough" that "provides a lot of enjoyment" despite its flaws. A reviewer for Maximum stated that "From the producers of Warlord I and II, Steel Panthers is everything you'd expected, with authentic WWII footage and over 200 digitized photographs of tanks adding an interesting dimension to the proceedings. A must for any war game guru." They gave it 3 out of 5 stars.

== Legacy ==
Retrospectively, author Rusel DeMaria remarked that Gary Grigsby "created what many believe to be the ultimate armor simulation in Steel Panthers." In 1996, Computer Gaming World declared Steel Panthers the 53rd-best computer game ever released: the editors dubbed it "the culmination of such successes as Kampfgruppe, Panzer Strike and Typhoon of Steel." The magazine's wargame columnist Terry Coleman named it his pick for the fourth-best computer wargame released by late 1996. Steel Panthers and Steel Panthers II were named, collectively, the 62nd best computer game ever by PC Gamer UK in 1997.

The success of Steel Panthers led to a franchise: the game was followed by Steel Panthers II: Modern Battles and Steel Panthers III: Brigade Command 1939–1999. The game and its sequels proved to be significant hits for SSI, coming on the heels of the company's lucrative Panzer General.

=== Add-ons and freeware version ===
According to Robert Mayer of Computer Games Magazine, Steel Panthers "inspired a cottage industry of for-profit add-ons made by enterprising users." In mid-1999, the team behind website The Gamers Net (TGN) launched a heavy mod of Steel Panthers called Steel Panthers: World War 2. TGN had been founded by wargamer David Heath and others, who had managed to obtain the Steel Panthers source code from Strategic Simulations. Heath later described this as an unusual arrangement. Gary Grigsby, Keith Brors and Joel Billings were involved in the project.

Heath subsequently founded Matrix Games, whose debut project was Steel Panthers: World at War. A remake of Steel Panthers, it launched as freeware in May 2000, and won the 2000 Charles Roberts Award for "Best 20th Century Era Computer Wargame".
