= Gary Grigsby's Pacific War =

1992 video game

- Developer(s): Strategic Simulations
- Publisher(s): Strategic Simulations
- Designer(s): Gary Grigsby
- Platform(s): MS-DOS
- Release: 1992
- Genre(s): Computer wargame

Gary Grigsby's Pacific War is a 1992 computer wargame for MS-DOS from Strategic Simulations It covers World War II in the Pacific between the Japanese Empire and the Allies, which include the United States, the British Empire, the Netherlands, Australia, New Zealand, Canada, the Philippines, and China. The main map of the game stretches from north of the Aleutians to southern New Zealand and Australia, and from the eastern coast of India to the West Coast of North America. It includes aircraft carrier operations, amphibious assaults, surface bombardments/engagements, strategic bombing, kamikazes, and the submarine war against naval and merchant shipping.

A follow-up was published in 2004: War in the Pacific.

== Gameplay ==
The role of the player is that of high level command. Players decide what will be attacked or defended, appoint commanders, and provide the resources (aircraft, ships, and land combat units) to accomplish the goals. The lowest level of player control is roughly equivalent to that of a theater commander. Details of combat depend on commanders appointed by the player.

Players exercise control at higher levels, roughly equivalent to having influence in the Japanese Imperial General Headquarters, the UK Imperial War Cabinet, or the US Joint Chiefs Of Staff. Players have the ability in most cases to impose an overall strategy and require shared goals and cooperation between, as examples, the Japanese Army and Navy, UK and the US, or the US Army and USMC.

The game places some restrictions on imposing non-historical strategies and cooperation. The Japanese player cannot abandon China (the Imperial Japanese Army's main goal). The Allied player has land combat units that must remain in the US for its defense and (in the SSI version) land combat units that must remain in Australia. The Allied player is subject to Royal Navy ships being temporarily removed from the game as a simulation of the Royal Navy's global responsibilities. The Allied player can not accelerate the transfer of USN ships to the Pacific theater. USN ships arrive in the Pacific on the historic dates. The ability of each side to overrun China is limited.

The game runs on Preparation Points. Most events in the game consume Preparation Points. The Japanese player receives Preparation Points based on Japan's oil reserve. This means the Japanese player must capture bases with oil early in the game. While early in the game, the Japanese player has superior combat capability, the player cannot exploit this superiority without Preparation Points.

The Allied player receives Preparation Points based on the game date. Available Allied Preparation Points increase as the game progresses. The Allied player has a higher maximum number of Preparation Points per HQ than the Japanese player.

=== Scenarios ===
The game is a turn-based setup, each turn covering one week. It can be played as a solo player against the AI; or by two players, either on the same computer, or by email play. A solo player can choose to play either Japan or Allies. Game balance can be adjusted to give one side or the other 'help' or 'maximum help', resulting in that side getting more replacements, improved production, and faster reinforcements. Matrix has scenarios developed specifically for play against the computer and others developed for two human players.

There are provisions for fighting shorter campaigns: the Japanese offensive period; Coral Sea - Midway period; Guadalcanal; the Marianas landings; or the Leyte Gulf battles. Alternately, players can select the entire war from December 1941 Pearl Harbor, or a slightly shorter version from 1942 to surrender. Matrix includes a non-historical scenario which starts after a hypothetical Japanese victory at Midway.

== Development ==
The game was originally designed and programmed by Gary Grigsby, produced by George MacDonald, and with game development by Joel Billings, David Landrey and James Young.

SSI did not ship the game with a printed map for cost reasons. Computer Gaming World in March 1994 published a map from SSI as part of about 30 pages of supplementary material, including an index, improved table of contents, checklists, and playing suggestions.

== Reception ==
In 2004, SSI founder Joel Billings wrote that Pacific War "sold between 15,000 and 20,000 units at full price, and many more as part of multi-product wargame bundles."

Computer Gaming World stated in April 1993 that "Here it is, the game Grigsby fans have been waiting eight years for! The whole of World War II in the Pacific, from Seattle to Calcutta! Awesome!" The magazine stated that "Pacific War is a milestone in computer wargaming—it's the first true computer 'monstergame'". It warned that the game's difficulty, user interface, and lack of a tutorial or paper map made it appealing only for dedicated wargamers willing to spend "ten to twenty hours just learning to play". A survey of wargames that year in the magazine gave the game four stars out of five, calling it "The simulation of the Pacific ... I find it overwhelming, but I can recognize quality when I see it. Highly recommended for retirees, or for those for whom the expression "Get a life!" means something". The magazine named Pacific War the 1993 Wargame of the Year, and in 1994 wished that Great Naval Battles Vol. 2 had its "solid game design".

== Legacy ==
In 1996, Computer Gaming World declared Pacific War the 109th-best computer game ever released. The magazine's wargame columnist Terry Coleman named it his pick for the 13th-best computer wargame released by late 1996. A smaller-scale follow-up to Pacific War, entitled Uncommon Valor: Campaign for the South Pacific, was released by Grigsby and 2 by 3 Games in 2002. In 2004, they launched a full successor of Pacific War under the name War in the Pacific.

=== Matrix Games version ===
In September 2000, publisher Matrix Games launched an updated version of Pacific War entitled Pacific War: The Matrix Project, released as freeware. Grigsby had joined Matrix earlier that year. Matrix credited Richard Dionne and Jeremy Pritchard with making the changes that resulted in the Matrix edition. The game followed Matrix's freeware updates of two other Grigsby titles, Steel Panthers and Gary Grigsby's War in Russia.
