= War in the South Pacific =

1987 video game

- Publisher: Strategic Simulations
- Designer: Gary Grigsby
- Platforms: Apple II, Commodore 64, PC-98
- Release: 1987
- Genre: Computer wargame

War in the South Pacific is a 1987 computer wargame designed by Gary Grigsby and published by Strategic Simulations. It is classified as a monster wargame.

== Gameplay ==
War in the South Pacific is a computer wargame that simulates Pacific Theatre conflicts during World War II. It is classified as a monster wargame, and allows sea, land and air combat. The title contains both historical and hypothetical battles.

== Development ==
War in the South Pacific was designed by Gary Grigsby and was published by Strategic Simulations Inc. (SSI). According to Bob Proctor of Computer Gaming World, the title had a troubled development and "was delayed more than a year" because its scope chafed against RAM limitations. "[T]he various game modules are all within a handful of bytes of filling the memory", he wrote, and noted War in the South Pacific shipped with glitches because it was impossible to fix them without more RAM. These problems led SSI reconsider producing monster wargames for 64K machines; Proctor wrote that Grigsby and the rest of the team were "well aware of the game's faults" when it shipped. War in the South Pacific was released in 1987 for the Apple II and Commodore 64.

== Reception ==
Reception

Review score
Publication	Score
Computer Play	6.76/10

J. L. Miller of Computer Play called the game "complex and interesting, but recommended only to those with a special interest in the period." Bob Proctor of Computer Gaming World agreed: "I can only recommend WITSP to those who are very serious wargamers, have a particular interest in the Pacific theater, and have lots of time to delve into it", he wrote.
