= Dagon (novel) =

1968 novel by Fred Chappell

- Author: Fred Chappell
- Language: English
- Genre: Horror, Psychological thriller
- Publisher: Harcourt, Brace & World
- Publication date: 1968
- Publication place: United States
- Media type: Print
- Pages: 177 p.
- OCLC: 1438823

Dagon is a novel by author Fred Chappell published in 1968. The novel is a psychological thriller with supernatural elements, attempting to tell a Cthulhu Mythos story as a psychologically realistic Southern Gothic novel. It was awarded the Best Foreign Book of the Year prize by the French Academy in 1972.

This early novel is one of the author's most widely read works. In The New York Times, it was praised as being "of a very high order [and] precise, dry elegance".

== Bibliography ==
- Casey Clabough, "Fred Chappell's Cthulhu Appropriations: Dagon", in Lovecraft Studies, 44, pp. 113–118.
