= East Front (board game) =

Board wargame published in 1976

Cover of Control Box edition, 1976

East Front is a board wargame published by The Control Box, Inc. in 1976 that simulates combat on the Russo-German Front during World War II. The game had unusual hexagonal-shaped counters rather than the more traditional square counters.

== Description ==
East Front is a two-player game in which one player controls the German forces invading the Soviet Union, and the other player controls the Soviet defenders. With two large (21" x 28") hex grid maps covering the entire front from Finland to the Caspian Sea and 800 counters, the game is complex.

=== Gameplay ===
East Front uses the game system developed for SPI's wargame Kursk in 1971: The German player

- moves all units
- engages in combat
- moves all mechanized units a second time

The Russian player then has the same opportunity, completing one game turn, which represents 2 weeks of game time.

=== Scenarios ===
The game comes with nine scenarios:

- "Invasion of Poland" — Critic Nick Palmer claimed this two-turn scenario was the shortest to appear in a board wargame with the exception of GDW's Chaco, which also had a two-turn scenario
- "Barbarossa"
- "Stalingrad"
- "High Water Mark"
- "Kursk"
- "Destruction of Army Group Center"
- "Campaign Game" — 109-turn scenario covering the entire war from the start of Operation Barbarossa to the Fall of Berlin.

== Publication history ==
East Front was designed by Kip Allen and Stephen G. Bettum and published by Control Box in 1976 in a ziplock pouch. The game was also published as a boxed set by Excalibre Games the same year.

== Reception ==
In Issue 11 of Urf Durfal, Greg Costikyan liked the components, although he noted that the hexagonal counters were smaller than their square counterparts, "thus the unit symbols and strengths are printed more minutely [and] can cause a bit of eye strain." However, Costikyan had issue with the rules, calling them "one of the worst set of rules I have seen in a professionally published game. They seem to be arranged with deliberate intent to confuse. They're unclear and ambiguous, do not explain any of the mechanisms sufficiently, are written in simple language when complex terminology is necessary, and complicated language when directness is necessary." On the other hand, Costikyan liked a number of innovations in the rules, including the supply system and the varying quality of units available to both sides as the game progresses. He concluded, "All in all, East Front is not a bad game. It contains a number of intriguing innovations that I'd like to see developed in further games, and the graphics are good. Although the rules seem to have been written by the chimpanzee-and-typewriter method, with a bit of thought and experimentation they can be puzzled out. [...] The game is definitely worth getting, unless you have a phobia about East Front games."

In The Guide to Simulations/Games for Education and Training, Martin Campion commented on this game's usefulness as an educational aid, saying, "This is a splendid simulation and a valuable compromise between the abstraction of Barbarossa and the excessive detail of War in the East. This game might displace Barbarossa as my favorite classroom game on its subject."

== Other reviews and commentary ==
- Panzerfaust & Campaign #77
- Campaign #79
- Fire & Movement #7 & #10
- Perfidious Albion #81 & #82
