= Typhoon of Steel (video game) =

1988 video game

- Developer(s): Strategic Simulations
- Publisher(s): Strategic Simulations
- Designer(s): Gary Grigsby
- Platform(s): Apple II, Amiga, Commodore 64, MS-DOS
- Release: Apple II, C64; NA: 1988; Amiga; NA: 1990; MS-DOS; NA: 1991
- Genre(s): Wargame

Typhoon of Steel is a computer wargame designed by Gary Grigsby and published in 1988 by Strategic Simulations for the Apple II, Commodore 64, Amiga, and IBM PC. A follow-up to Grigsby's 1987 game Panzer Strike, it simulates military conflict during World War II.

In 1989, Typhoon of Steel was followed by Overrun!, which features an updated version of its engine and mechanics. It simulated hypothetical conflicts in Europe and the Middle East during the Cold War.

== Gameplay ==
Typhoon of Steel is a computer wargame that simulates military conflict during World War II, covering combat scenarios in the Asiatic-Pacific Theater and European Theatre. Alongside its pre-made scenarios, it features an editor that allows players to create hypothetical battles. Typhoon of Steel contains a "Banzai" rule to impact games that become imbalanced.

== Development ==
Typhoon of Steel was designed by Gary Grigsby and published by Strategic Simulations Inc. (SSI). A sequel to Grigsby's game Panzer Strike, it reuses that project's game engine and mechanics, updated to focus on different sections of World War II. This design reuse followed a common trend for SSI titles at the time: the game systems of successful titles were often reused in subsequent products. Like its predecessor, Typhoon of Steel debuted in 1988.

== Reception ==
Reception

Review scores
Publication	Score
Zzap!	78%
Computer Play	8.15/10

M. Evan Brooks reviewed the game for Computer Gaming World, and stated that "for the dedicated gamer, Typhoon of Steel offers an engaging, albeit time-consuming, study of small unit actions during World War II in the South Pacific."

In Computer Play, Russ Ceccola offered Typhoon of Steel a positive review and recommended it to "the serious war gamer". Computer Gaming World nominated Typhoon of Steel for its "Wargame of the Year" award, which ultimately went to Battles of Napoleon.

Reviewing the Amiga version, George Campbell of Strategy Plus dubbed Typhoon of Steel "an excellent game". Zzap!'s reviewer considered the game flawed, but noted that it contained "a lot of worthwhile detail" and "plenty of ambition".

== Legacy ==
Typhoon of Steel was followed by Overrun!, which reused the game's mechanics and engine, updated to focus on modern warfare scenarios.

In 1996, Computer Gaming World declared Typhoon of Steel the 143rd-best computer game ever released.
