= Forge of Freedom: The American Civil War =

2006 video game

Forge of Freedom: The American Civil War 1861-1865
- Developer: Western Civilization Software
- Publisher: Matrix Games
- Platform: Windows
- Release: NA: November 30, 2006
- Genre: Computer wargame
- Modes: Single-player, multiplayer

Forge of Freedom: The American Civil War is a computer wargame, combining both a strategic level and a tactical level by means of letting the player(s) raise, equip and move armies and then fight out battles on a randomized map when encountering the enemy. This game was made by Western Civilization Software, whose headquarters is located just outside Ann Arbor, Michigan, and uses the same game engine as the company's 2005 release, "Crown of Glory: Europe in the Age of Napoleon" and 2009 expansion Crown of Glory: Emperor's Edition, which likewise features a combination of grand strategy and tactics.

== Basic Facts ==
There are two playable factions available in this game, the Confederacy and the Union (although foreign intervention is a possibility). The campaign map for the strategic level stretches from Minnesota to Texas and from Maine to Florida. Battle maps for the tactical level are made of terrain hexes which correspond to how far a unit can move. Battles are fought at the brigade-level, and the player gets to customize his brigades by purchasing weapons and "brigade attributes" (e.g., brigade cavalry, scouts, sharpshooters, Zouaves). There are more than 1000 Civil War generals in the game, with the most famous (and infamous) having a 100% chance to appear each game, while the less famous ones have a much smaller chance of entering the game. As part of an ongoing project, some players of "Forge of Freedom" have been volunteering to write biographies of each general that is included in the game, adding an educational dimension to the game. The game also features economics, European diplomacy, trade, and politics (in the form of state governors), which are all important for success.

== Scenarios ==
There are no scenarios starting after 1861. The simplistic nature of the economic system provided with the game does not easily map to real life events and statistics.

== Reviews ==
- Gamesquad.com
- ArmchairGeneral.com
- BovineConspiracy.com
- GameSpy

== Interview with Developers ==
- Armchair General interview
- Ann Arbor News
- GamersInfo.net
