= Rising Sun (video game) =

2000 computer wargame

- Developer: TalonSoft
- Publisher: Take-Two Interactive
- Platform: Windows
- Release: February 1, 2000
- Genre: Computer wargame
- Modes: Single-player, multiplayer

Rising Sun is a 2000 computer wargame developed by TalonSoft and published by Take-Two Interactive. Set during the Pacific War, it is an entry in TalonSoft's Campaign series.

Rising Sun won positive reviews from critics and was nominated for awards by Computer Gaming World and Computer Games Magazine.

== Gameplay ==
Rising Sun is a computer wargame that simulates conflict during the Pacific War.

== Development ==
Rising Sun was developed by TalonSoft as the last game in its Campaign series, following titles such as East Front and West Front. It was released on February 1, 2000.

== Reception ==
Reception

Review scores
Publication	Score
Computer Games Magazine	4.5/5
Computer Gaming World	4.5/5
CNET Gamecenter	9/10

Rising Sun received an average score of 82% on the review aggregation website GameRankings. The game was nominated for Computer Games Magazine's 2000 "Wargame of the Year" award. Computer Gaming World nominated Rising Sun in the same category, but gave the prize to Combat Mission: Beyond Overlord. The editors called Rising Sun a "terrific" title that "took the traditional hex-based wargame to its zenith".

In Computer Games Magazine, Carl Lund wrote that Rising Sun's "epic scope and sheer massiveness ensure replayability for months, if not years, to come." Bruce Geryk of Computer Gaming World similarly praised the game for "tak[ing] the hex-based, sequential-turn wargame to a level of refinement previously unseen".

== Legacy ==
=== Imperial Strike ===
Reception

Review scores
Publication	Score
Computer Games Magazine	3.5/5
CNET Gamecenter	6/10

=== Sequel ===
Although announced as the final game in the Campaign series, Rising Sun received a follow-up in 2001 under the title Divided Ground: Middle East Conflict 1948-1973.
