= Steel Panthers =

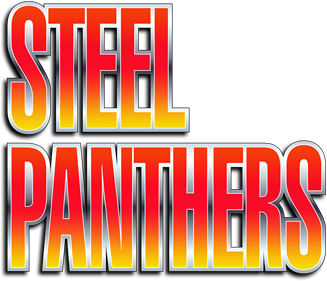
- Genre(s): Tactical wargame
- Developer(s): Strategic Simulations; Matrix Games; Camo Workshop
- Publisher(s): Mindscape; Strategic Simulations; Matrix Games; Shrapnel Games
- Creator(s): Gary Grigsby; Keith Brors
- Platform(s): MS-DOS, Windows
- First release: Steel Panthers; 1995
- Latest release: Steel Panthers: Main Battle Tank and "Steel Panthers: WW2"; 2018

Steel Panthers: World at War!

Steel Panthers is a series of computer wargames, developed and published by several different companies, with various games simulating war battles from 1930 to 2025. The first Steel Panthers game was released in 1995, and the most recent update was released in 2018 and is still updated regularly (yearly).

Players control individual tanks and vehicles from a top-down perspective, on a map with a hexagonal overlay. Infantry are mostly in squad/section (8-12 men) sized units, but some units, like snipers, can be controlled individually. The whole force under a player's control would typically be Battalion sized, but may be as small as a Platoon or Company, or as large as a Regiment/Brigade.

The games are turn-based and are played against the AI or other humans via email or hotseat.

== Gameplay ==
As with other tactical turn-based wargames, the game features realistic military control, with the smallest common units being squads, up to a brigade sized force. The player takes control of nearly every aspects of warfare around his soldiers, from simple ammunition usage, to the morale, disposition, and command-chain of his troops.

The game features: packed single-battle scenarios and campaigns (either branched or linear), single battle generator, campaign generator, and long campaign generator.

All of the games in the series are quite similar in features and appearance. However, the third part in the original series is clearly distinct in that it offers platoon-size formations instead of the scale of individual tanks and squads of the other installments.

The games offer various modes of play: human vs. human (hotseat or online), human vs. AI and PBEM (play by email). The players receive historical military units at the beginning of a scenario and have the option to buy reinforcements with points earned in different ways. The units are then moved on a hexagon grid map similar to a large number of board and computerized wargames. In addition to ready-made battles and campaigns, players can customize single scenarios or create their own campaigns.

== Series history ==
The Steel Panthers series includes the following titles:

- 1995 Steel Panthers by Strategic Simulations
  - 1996 Steel Panthers: Campaign Disk by Strategic Simulations
  - 1997 Steel Panthers: Campaign Disk #2 by Strategic Simulations
- 1996 Steel Panthers II: Modern Battles by Strategic Simulations
  - 1996 Steel Panthers II: Modern Battles - Campaign Disk by Strategic Simulations
- 1997 Steel Panthers III: Brigade Command: 1939-1999 by Strategic Simulations
- 1998 SP2WW2 (Steel Panthers II: World War 2) by Camo Workshop
  - 1999 SPWW2 by Camo Workshop
  - 2006 WinSPWW2 by Camo Workshop, Distributed by Shrapnel Games
- 2000 Steel Panthers: World at War by Matrix Games
- 2002 SPMBT (Steel Panthers: Main Battle Tank) by Camo Workshop
  - 2005 WinSPMBT by Camo Workshop, Distributed by Shrapnel Games

Rights to the game and source code were acquired by both Matrix Games and the Camo Workshop.

Matrix Games developed and released as a freeware a remake based on the Steel Panthers III engine (but limited to the timespan of World War II), Steel Panthers: World at War!

== Reception ==
In 1998, Jim Cobb of Computer Gaming World referred to the Steel Panthers series as a "cash cow". Author Rusel DeMaria later summarized the situation: "about 18 months in marketing time after Panzer General's phenomenal success, another series did extremely well for SSI." The original Steel Panthers proved highly popular, and Steel Panthers II became a "major" hit, according to DeMaria.

Steel Panthers was named the best wargame of 1995 by Computer Gaming World, PC Gamer US and Computer Games Strategy Plus. The editors of PC Gamer US called it "easily one of the best tactical simulations ever developed for the PC."

Steel Panthers and Steel Panthers II were named, collectively, the 62nd best computer game ever by PC Gamer UK in 1997.

== Literature ==
- Walker M. H. Games That Sell!. — Wordware Publishing, 2003. — 550 p. — (Wordware Game and Graphics Library). — ISBN 9781556229503. — ISBN 155622950X.
- Black M., Kurlander E. Revisiting the «Nazi Occult»: Histories, Realities, Legacies. — Boydell & Brewer, 2015. — 297 p. — (German history in context). — ISBN 9781571139061. — ISBN 1571139060.
