= Divided Ground: Middle East Conflict 1948–1973 =

2001 wargame video game

- Developer: TalonSoft
- Publisher: Take-Two Interactive
- Platform: Windows
- Release: July 2001
- Genre: Computer wargame
- Modes: Single-player, multiplayer

Divided Ground: Middle East Conflict 1948–1973 is a 2001 computer wargame developed by TalonSoft and published by Take-Two Interactive. It is part of the Campaign series, and follows Rising Sun.

== Gameplay ==
Divided Ground is a computer wargame that simulates Arab–Israeli military conflict between the foundation of Israel in 1948 through the Yom Kippur War in 1973.

== Development ==
Divided Ground was developed by TalonSoft as an entry in its Campaign series, which had previously included titles such as East Front and Rising Sun. It reuses the game engine from earlier titles in the series. The game was first announced under the title Arab-Israeli Wars in March 2001. Divided Ground was shipped to retailers on July 31.

== Reception ==
Reception

Review scores
Publication	Score
Computer Gaming World	1.5/5
GameSpot	6.2/10

Divided Ground received a negative review from Computer Gaming World's Bruce Geryk, who argued that its "scenario design is quite possibly the worst of any recent computer game." In a middling review, Tom Chick of GameSpot wrote, "The Campaign engine has been around far too long to be simply rehashed with so few changes."
