= No Greater Glory: The American Civil War =

1991 video game

- Developer: Strategic Simulations
- Publisher: Strategic Simulations
- Platforms: Amiga, Classic Mac OS, MS-DOS
- Release: 1991: MS-DOS; 1992: Amiga, Mac

No Greater Glory: The American Civil War is a video game published by Strategic Simulations for MS-DOS in 1991. Ports to the Amiga and Classic Mac OS were released in 1992.

== Gameplay ==
No Greater Glory: The American Civil War is a game in which the player leads either the North or South in a strategic simulation of the American Civil War.

== Reception ==
M. Evan Brooks reviewed the game for Computer Gaming World, and stated that "Overall, NGG is a challenging simulation, but one that will require much effort by the gamer in order to achieve victory by either side. This reviewer still finds the game to be a significant challenge."
