= Eastern Uganda campaign =

Eastern Uganda campaign may refer to:

- Eastern Uganda campaign of 1979
- Operations in eastern Uganda 1986–1994
- NRA and UNLA offensives of February and March 1986
