= Operacao Littorio =

Board wargame published in 1976

Cover of rulebook

Operacao Littorio is a board wargame published by Attack Wargaming Association in 1976 that simulates a hypothetical mid-twentieth-century war in South America fomented by Brazil.

== Description ==
Operacao Littorio is a wargame for 2–4 players in which Brazil tries to conquer all of South America in a hypothetical conflict. In addition to standard combat, players may use air drops and amphibious assaults. Certain parts of the game reflect political rumors in the 1970s, including that Argentina may have nuclear weapons, and that the Soviet Union may be providing aid to Brazil.

== Publication history ==
In 1977, Dave Casciano designed Operacao Littorio, which was subsequently published by his company AWA (Attack Wargaming Association, also known as Dave Casciano Co. or DCC) packaged in a ziplock bag.

== Reception ==
In his 1977 book The Comprehensive Guide to Board Wargaming, Nick Palmer called this a "Strategic South American fantasy: Brazil reaches for continental domination."

In The Guide to Simulations/Games for Education and Training, Richard Rydzel considered the game as a potential educational aid, noting, "This could be an interesting game but the rules are vague and incomplete. The map is also vague and, because of its garish coloring, difficult to focus on." Rydzel concluded, "Revision is necessary before this game can be played in a school."
