= Deathrealm =

Horror fiction magazine

Deathrealm was a Horror fiction magazine edited by Stephen Mark Rainey. It won the International Horror Guild Award for best periodical in 1995.
