= Kampfgruppe (video game) =

- Developer: Strategic Simulations
- Publisher: Strategic Simulations
- Designer: Gary Grigsby
- Platforms: Amiga, Apple II, Atari 8-bit, Commodore 64, MS-DOS
- Release: Apple, Atari 8-bit, C64; NA: 1985; IBM PC; NA: 1987; Amiga; 1988
- Genre: Computer wargame

Kampfgruppe is a computer wargame designed by Gary Grigsby and published in 1984 by Strategic Simulations for the Apple II, Atari 8-bit computers, and Commodore 64. Kampfgruppe is a game of tactical-scale combat on the Eastern Front. An MS-DOS port was released in 1987 followed by an Amiga version in 1988.

== Development ==
Kampfgruppe was designed by Gary Grigsby and released in 1985, the same year he launched U.S.A.A.F. - United States Army Air Force and Mech Brigade. He chose to incorporate line of sight in Kampfgruppe, a first for a Strategic Simulations title. Its design has been compared to that of PanzerBlitz; J. L. Miller of Computer Play dubbed it "the computer version of PanzerBlitz".

== Reception ==
Reception

Review score
Publication	Score
Computer Play	8.28/10

Kampfgruppe was a commercial hit. By late 1985, it had sold 8,000 units and was forecast to reach 25,000 sales over its lifetime. It was widely acclaimed by fans of the wargame genre.

Computer Gaming World's Mark Bausman called Kampfgruppe a "truly superior game" that allowed the player to "exercise his imagination without having to follow a complicated game structure." In Current Notes, M. Evan Brooks called Kampfgruppe an "instant classic" and offered it his "highest recommendation". While criticizing the over-complex rulebook, Antic approved of being able to issue orders to entire combat formations. The magazine stated that "the game is an absolute must for any East Front devotee. I would also recommend it to any serious wargame", concluding that it was "well worth the hefty price".

In 1985, Computer Gaming World's readers voted Kampfgruppe the best game of the year across all categories. The magazine's editors concurred that it was "the finest wargame currently available", and argued that it would "be looked back upon as a true landmark effort in computer wargaming."

== Legacy ==
Kampfgruppe was among the first inductees into Computer Gaming World's "Hall of Fame" section in 1988, and remained readers' highest-rated strategy title by that time. In 1996, Computer Gaming World declared Kampfgruppe the 101st-best computer game ever released. The magazine's wargame columnist Terry Coleman named it his pick for the eighth-best computer wargame released by late 1996. In his 1989 computer wargame survey, J. L. Miller of Computer Play dubbed Kampfgruppe a "classic".

SSI later released the Kampfgruppe Scenario Disk, which adds five scenarios to the game.
