= War in the Pacific (video game) =

2004 video game

- Developer: 2 by 3 Games
- Publisher: Matrix Games
- Designers: Gary Grigsby, Keith Brors
- Platform: Microsoft Windows
- Release: 2004
- Genre: Computer wargame

War in the Pacific: The Struggle Against Japan 1941–1945 is a 2004 computer wargame developed by 2 by 3 Games and published by Matrix Games. Designed by Gary Grigsby and Keith Brors, it is the successor to Gary Grigsby's Pacific War (1992) and Uncommon Valor: Campaign for the South Pacific (2002).

== Gameplay ==
War in the Pacific is a computer wargame that simulates the Pacific Theater during World War II.

== Development ==
War in the Pacific was announced and began development around April 2000. It was the first title that designer Gary Grigsby planned to create for Matrix Games, a wargame studio he had joined that year. The game was intended as a follow-up to the 1992 title Gary Grigsby's Pacific War. In January 2001, Grigsby co-founded 2 by 3 Games with collaborators Joel Billings and Keith Brors, where War in the Pacific continued development under a new deal with Matrix. It was to be the second of three planned games, alongside Uncommon Valor and an unnamed project. 2 by 3's debut Uncommon Valor was intended as a stepping stone and teaser for War in the Pacific that covered the subject at a smaller scale. Made with the game engine from Uncommon Valor, War in the Pacific was initially planned for a late-2001 release.

War in the Pacific was co-designed by Grigsby and Brors. Development proved to be long and troubled; Grigsby said that he "hit the wall" of complexity and could not "keep it in [his] head anymore". Billings said that it was the largest wargame the creators had ever attempted. The initial plan to import the Uncommon Valor artificial intelligence (AI) code proved unsuccessful, as the system broke down when applied at the War in the Pacific scale. In March 2004, Billings reported that playtesting the game was time-consuming, as its "longest scenario can last around 1,700 turns". Grigsby concluded during development, "I am never ever, ever, ever doing a game like [War in the Pacific] again."

== Reception ==
Reception

Review score
Publication	Score
Computer Gaming World	3.5/5

In retrospect, Wargamer's James Cobb wrote that War in the Pacific was "acclaimed by devotees of the conflict". According to Joel Billings, the team had expected its sales to range between 5,000 and 15,000 copies. He said in November 2004 that the game was on track to meet those forecasts. The game was nominated for the 2004 Charles S. Roberts Award for "Best 20th Century Era Computer Wargame", but lost to Battles in Normandy.

Bruce Geryk of Computer Gaming World wrote that War in the Pacific "isn't really so much a game as it is a project", and considered its extreme complexity to make it suitable only for the most dedicated players. However, he felt that they would be "amply rewarded" for their time. Reviewing the game for Wargamer, Al Berke concurred with Geryk about the game's complexity, and dubbed it "a powerful simulation of theater warfare". He considered its learning curve high, but believed that dedicated wargame fans would appreciate the title. StrategyPage's John Siminoff likewise wrote, "If you are in the market for a seriously detailed WWII strategic simulation, especially one dealing with material far less frequently covered than the Western War, War in the Pacific will satisfy you like nothing else on the market."

== New Edition ==
In 2009 Matrix Games released a new edition of the game titled War in the Pacific: Admiral's Edition. The new edition included a larger map covering more of the globe, a larger map scale, updates to gameplay and art, changes to the game engine, and new scenarios.
