= Maximum-Football =

2006 video game

- Developer(s): Wintervalley Software
- Publisher(s): Matrix Games
- Designer(s): David Winter
- Platform(s): Windows
- Release: NA: March 3, 2006 (version 1.0); NA: September 21, 2007 (version 2.0)
- Genre(s): Sports
- Mode(s): Single-player multiplayer multiplayer online

Maximum-Football is a gridiron and arena football computer game developed by Wintervalley Software and published by Matrix Games for Windows-based computers.

== Gameplay ==
Players can choose to play a game under Canadian, American or indoor rules, or create their own league with unique rules. The game allows for maximum customization of players, teams, and uniforms, and has a detailed Play Development System for creating plays and playbooks.

The game includes a basic career mode. Team owners can set up team profiles for maximum drafting of players and can set up a training camp.

Maximum-Football does not feature licenses of any current football league, but the game does allow users maximum customization of leagues thus the game creates names and locations based on the actual teams name and location.

== Release ==
The game had spent 2½ years in development. The initial prices of the game (for download and CD copy respectively) were $40 and $50. There is no demo available for this title.

Maximum-Football 1.0 was released on March 3, 2006, after missing previous release targets in the two years leading up to release. Many of the delays were caused by features being added to the game that had been asked for by community members on the Maximum-Football and Matrix Games message boards.

Version 1.0 was the first public version of the game.

Version 2.0 was released on September 21, 2007. Version 2.0 supports a new graphics engine, new and improved player animations, new and improved arcade play features, as well as additional league support features.

Version 2.2 is the currently shipping version as of April 9, 2008.

A 2019 version of the game features an endorsement from Doug Flutie, the former NFL and CFL quarterback.
