= Matrix Games =

Publisher of PC games

- Type: Private (US LLC, UK Ltd)
- Industry: Strategy and wargames for personal computers
- Founded: 1999
- Headquarters: Dayton, Ohio, United States; Epsom, Surrey, United Kingdom
- Key people: JD McNeil, Iain McNeil, Erik Rutins, Marco A. Minoli, Philip Veale, Shaun Wallace
- Number of employees: 30+
- Website: matrixgames.com

Matrix Games is a publisher of PC games, specifically strategy games and wargames. It is based in Ohio, US, and Surrey, UK.

Their focus is primarily but not exclusively on wargames and turn-based strategy. The product line-up also includes space sims (Starshatter: The Gathering Storm), sports management sims (Maximum-Football), and real-time strategy titles (Close Combat: Cross of Iron).

Matrix Games publishes games from a variety of developers, including SSG, 2by3 Games, Panther Games, Koios Works, Destroyer Studios, Western-Civilization and AGEOD.

== History ==
Matrix Games was founded by David Heath, Erik Rutins, Patty Rutins and Paul Vebber in 1999 in Staten Island, New York City. As of January 2010, Matrix Games has published over 75 titles. Matrix has in-house artists, programmers, and producers which all take active roles in projects of smaller wargame developers who lack the resources to hire full-time staff otherwise.

In May 2010, Matrix Games and Slitherine announced a merger of the two companies making it the largest wargaming specialist publisher. Matrix Games also publishes wargames for the US defense industry.

== Awards ==
Awards won for Matrix Games products include:

- PC Gamers Editors' Choice Award 93% for Korsun Pocket November 2003
- Computer Games Magazine – Top 10 of 2005 for Star Chamber
- Computer Gaming World – Wargame of the Year for Korsun Pocket 2003
- Computer Gaming World – Wargame of the Year for Battles in Normandy 2004
- 32nd Annual Origins Awards 2006 Vanguard Award for World At War
- 32nd Annual Origins Awards 2006 Lock n' Load Band of Heroes
- Charles S. Roberts Award 2007 for Guns of August
- Charles S. Roberts Award 2007 for Empires in Arms

== Games ==
- Advanced Tactics
- Armada 2526
- Armored Brigade
- Banzai!: For Pacific Fighters
- Battlefront
- Battlegrounds: American Civil War
- Battlegrounds: Napoleonic Wars
- Birth of America
- Blitzkrieg: War in Europe 1939–1945
- Campaign Series: Matrix Edition
- Campaigns on the Danube 1805/1809
- Carriers at War
- Case Blue: For IL-2 or Forgotten Battles
- Chariots of War
- Close Combat: Cross of Iron
- Close Combat: Modern Tactics
- Close Combat: Wacht am Rhein
- Close Combat: The Longest Day
- Combined Arms: World War II
- Command Ops: Battles from the Bulge
- Command: Modern Air / Naval Operations
- Commander: Europe at War Gold
- Conflict of Heroes: Awakening the Bear!
- Conquest! Medieval Realms
- Conquest of the Aegean
- Crown of Glory: Emperor's Edition
- Decisive Battles of WWII: Battles in Italy
- Decisive Battles of WWII: Battles in Normandy
- Decisive Battles of WWII: Korsun Pocket
- Decisive Battles of WWII: Korsun Pocket - Across the Dnepr
- Decisive Campaigns: The Blitzkrieg from Warsaw to Paris
- Distant Worlds
- Empires in Arms: The Napoleonic Wars of 1805–1815
- Field of Glory series
- Flashpoint Campaigns: Red Storm
- Flashpoint Germany
- For Liberty!
- Forge of Freedom: The American Civil War 1861–1865
- Gary Grigsby's Eagle Day to Bombing the Reich
- Gary Grigsby's War Between the States
- Gary Grigsby's War in the East
- Gary Grigsby's War in the East 2
- Gary Grigsby's War in the West
- Gary Grigsby's World at War
- Gates of Troy
- Guns of August: World War I 1914-1918
- Hannibal: Rome and Carthage in the Second Punic War (designed by Forced March Games)
- Harpoon 3: Advanced Naval Warfare
- Highway to the Reich
- Hired Guns: The Jagged Edge
- Horse and Musket: Volume 1
- The Last Days: For IL-2 Forgotten Battles
- Legion Arena Gold
- Lock 'n Load: Band of Heroes
- Mark H. Walker's Lock 'n Load: Heroes of Stalingrad
- Massive Assault
- Maximum-Football
- Norm Koger's The Operational Art of War III
- Officers: The Matrix Edition
- Operation Barbarossa – The Struggle for Russia
- Pacific War: Matrix Edition
- Panzer Command: Operation Winter Storm
- Panzer Command: Kharkov
- Panzer Command: Ostfront
- Panzer Corps: Wehrmacht
- PureSim Baseball 2007
- Reach for the Stars
- Scourge of War: Gettysburg
- Scourge of War: Antietam
- Scourge of War: Pipe Creek
- Scourge of War: Chancellorsville
- Scourge of War: Brandy Station
- Shadow Empire
- Smugglers IV – Doomsday
- Spartan
- Star Chamber: The Harbinger Saga
- Starshatter: The Gathering Storm
- Starships Unlimited – Divided Galaxies
- Starships Unlimited v3
- Steel Panthers: World at War – Generals Edition
- Storm Over the Pacific
- Strategic Command WWII Global Conflict
- Strategic Command Classic: WWI
- Strategic Command Classic: WWII
- Strategic Command: World War I
- Strategic Command WWII: Community Pack - DLC
- Strategic Command WWII: War in Europe
- Strategic Command WWII: World at War
- Supremacy: Four Paths To Power
- Team Assault: Baptism of Fire
- Time of Fury
- Tin Soldiers: Alexander the Great
- Tin Soldiers: Julius Caesar
- Titans of Steel: Warring Suns
- UFO: Extraterrestrials
- Uncommon Valor: Campaign for the South Pacific
- War in Russia: Matrix Edition
- War in the Pacific
- War in the Pacific: Admiral's Edition
- WarPlan
- WarPlan Pacific
- War Plan Orange: Dreadnoughts in the Pacific 1922–1930
- World in Flames
- World War One: La Grande Guerra
- World War One Gold
- World War II: General Commander
- WWII Online: Battleground Europe
- World War 2: Time of Wrath
