= William R. Trotter =

American novelist

- Born: July 15, 1943; Charlotte, North Carolina, U.S.
- Died: February 28, 2018 (aged 74); Greensboro, North Carolina, U.S.
- Occupations: Author; historian
- Spouse: Elizabeth Lustig (m. 1983)
- Children: 2 biological, 1 stepchild

William R. (Bill) Trotter (July 15, 1943 – February 28, 2018) was an American author and historian.

== Writings ==
Trotter's work covered a variety of genres and markets. His first published work was "Sibelius and the Tides of Taste" for High Fidelity in 1965. Lawyer Rob Newsom III invited him to write Deadly Kin, a true crime book, which was published in 1989. A research project Trotter started while at Davidson College about the Winter War eventually became the history book A Frozen Hell, published in 1991. It was awarded the Arts and Letters Prize of the Finlandia Foundation. A trilogy of books on the American Civil War in North Carolina was published in 1991 and 1992. Winter Fire, his first novel, was published in 1993. A horror novelette, "Siren of Swanquarter", published in Deathrealm magazine, was nominated for a Bram Stoker Award in 1994. His biography of conductor Dmitri Mitropoulos was published in 1995. He wrote two guides for the Close Combat series of computer games in 1999. A pair of historical novels set in North Carolina during the Civil War, Sands of Pride and Fires of Pride, were published in 2002 and 2003, and his most recent novel, Warrener's Beastie, was published in 2006. He has also written "The Desktop General" column for PC Gamer magazine since 1988. Trotter also has spent time in Filmography as an assistant director for Ghost Recon 2 in 2004 and as the musical consultant for one episode of Live from Lincoln Center in 1976.

Trotter was also a classical music expert and collector, owning one of the largest collections of vinyl and CD recordings in the Southeast. He wrote on classical music for the Charlotte Observer, the High Point Enterprise, and the Greensboro News & Record, among others, and served as program annotator for Greensboro's prestigious Eastern Music Festival. He was an acknowledged expert on the works of Jean Sibelius, the subject of his novel Winter Fire, and Leopold Stokowski, whose Trotter-penned biography has gone as yet unpublished but has made the rounds of the Leopold Stokowski Society for many years.

== Biography ==
Trotter was born in Charlotte, North Carolina. At the age of fourteen he wrote his first novel, Glorious October (unpublished) about the Hungarian revolution of 1956. He married his second wife, pianist Elizabeth Lustig, in 1983. They had one son together and one son each from previous marriages. Trotter and Lustig published The Northstate Reader monthly tabloid from 1981 to 1984. Trotter died on February 28, 2018, in Greensboro, North Carolina, of pancreatic cancer.

== Works ==
=== Novels ===
- Winter Fire (1993) ISBN 978-0-525-93581-0
- Sands of Pride (2002) ISBN 978-0-7867-1013-3
- Fires of Pride (2003) ISBN 978-0-7867-1448-3
- Warrener's Beastie (2006) ISBN 978-0-7867-1328-8

=== History ===
- Deadly Kin: A True Story of a Mass Family Murder (1988) ISBN 978-0-929307-00-8
- Silk Flags and Cold Steel (1988) ISBN 978-0-929307-01-5
- Bushwhackers!: The Mountains (1991) ISBN 978-0-89587-087-2
- Ironclads and Columbiads: The Coast (1991) ISBN 978-0-89587-088-9
- A Frozen Hell: The Russo-Finnish Winter War of 1939/40 (1991) ISBN 978-0-945575-22-1
  - Republished in 2002 as The Winter War: The Russo-Finnish War of 1939-1940
- Priest of Music: The Life of Dimitri Mitropoulos (1995) ISBN 978-0-931340-81-9

=== Computer guides ===
- Word Processing by Anderson and Trotter (1974) ISBN 978-0-8144-5356-8
- Ascendancy: The Official Strategy Guide (1995) ISBN 978-0-7615-0358-3
- Close Combat: Inside Moves (1996) ISBN 978-1-57231-308-8
- Close Combat - A Bridge Too Far: Inside Moves (1998) ISBN 978-1-57231-634-8

=== Novelettes and short stories ===
- "The Running Back from Yuggoth" - Fantasy Book June 1985
- "Bagman" - Night Cry Fall 1985
- "A Pinch of Snuff" - Deathrealm Fall/Win 1990
- "The Boss of the Seventh Level" - Deathrealm Spr 1992
- "A Graveside chat with Diedra Cox" - Deathrealm Win 1993
- "The Siren of Swanquarter" - Deathrealm Win 1993
- "Big Game" - Deathrealm Fall 1996
- "The Bleeding of Hauptmann Gehlen" - The Darkest Thirst, Anon, Design Image Group 1998
