= Computer wargame =

Wargame played on a computer or other digital device

A computerized version of the Avalon Hill board wargame Squad Leader

A computer wargame is a wargame played on a digital device. Descended from board wargaming, it simulates military conflict at the tactical, operational or strategic level. Computer wargames are both sold commercially for recreational use and, in some cases, used for military purposes.

== History ==
Computer wargames derived from tabletop wargames, which range from military wargaming to recreational wargaming. Wargames appeared on computers as early as Empire in 1972. The wargaming community saw the possibilities of computer gaming early and made attempts to break into the market, notably Avalon Hill's Microcomputer Games line, which began in 1980 and covered a variety of topics, including adaptations of some of their wargames. In February 1980 Strategic Simulations, Inc. (SSI) was the first to sell a serious, professionally packaged computer wargame, Computer Bismarck, a turn-based game based on the last battle of the battleship Bismarck.

Wargame designer Gary Grigsby joined the industry in 1982 with Guadalcanal Campaign, published by SSI. It is cited as the first monster wargame developed for computers. Grigsby became one of the most respected designers of computer wargames. In 1997, he was described as "one of the founding fathers of strategy war games for the PC." Computer Games Magazine later dubbed him "as much of an institution in his niche of computer gaming as Sid Meier, Will Wright, or John Carmack are in theirs." By 1996 he had released 23 wargames with SSI, including Steel Panthers, a commercial hit. In 2001, he co-founded the studio 2 by 3 Games with SSI's Joel Billings and Keith Brors, where they continued to work together on wargames.

SSI and Strategic Studies Group (SSG) were computer game companies that continued the genre by specializing in games that borrowed from board and miniature wargames. The companies enjoyed a certain popularity throughout much of the 1980s and into the 1990s. TalonSoft started in 1995 with a similar focus, until purchased and later closed down by Take-Two Interactive in 2002.

== Game design ==
Computer wargames primarily focus on simulated battles. Because it is difficult to provide an intelligent way to delegate tasks to a subordinate, war games typically keep the number of units down to hundreds rather than hundreds of thousands. The amount of realism varies between games as game designers balance an accurate simulation with playability.

Units are usually scaled to be disproportionately large compared to the landscape, in order to promote effective gameplay. These games usually use a much faster time line than reality, and thus wargames often do not model night time or sleep periods, though some games apply them, they can be time-consuming.

=== Comparison with board wargames ===
Tabletop wargames are usually categorized according to the scale of the confrontation (e.g., grand strategy wargame, strategic wargame, operational wargame, tactical wargame or man-to-man wargame). The qualifiers "real-time" and "turn-based" are not taken into account as all tabletop wargames are, by necessity, turn-based.

== Notable computer wargames ==
- Computer Bismarck - (Strategic Simulations, 1980) - generally credited as the first "serious" computer war-game.
- Eastern Front (1941) - (Atari Program Exchange, 1981) - Called "the first war game that competed with pencil-and-paper games" and one of the best selling programs for the Atari 8-bit computers. Introduced scrolling maps, pondering AI, morale, supply considerations and many other advanced features that were common in later games. Chris Crawford's first major success.
- Gary Grigsby's Pacific War (1993)
- Panzer General - (Strategic Simulations, 1994) - recognizably a traditional wargame next to Close Combat. It spawned several sequels, some of which explored different subject matter.
- Battleground series (TalonSoft, 1995–1999)
- Steel Panthers - (Strategic Simulations, 1995) - a tactical wargame on the same scale as Squad Leader, which led to two sequels, and then a series of titles by Camo Workshop/Shrapnel Games and Matrix Games, for free release.
- Close Combat - (Microsoft, 1996) - not the first wargame to break out from hexes, and still presented in a 2-dimensional format, Close Combat addressed factors such as individual morale and reluctance to carry out orders. The original title led to five successful sequels for the general public, as well as being developed into a training tool for military use only. Close Combat stemmed from an early attempt to translate the Squad Leader boardgame to the computer.
- The Operational Art of War Vol. 1: 1939–1955 - (TalonSoft, 1998)
- Combat Mission: Beyond Overlord - (Big Time Software, 2000)
- Decisive Battles of WWII: Korsun Pocket - (Strategic Studies Group, 2003)
- TacOps – (Major I.L. Holdridge, 2003 for v4) – commercial version of “TacOpsCav 4”, an officially issued standard training device of the US Army. It is a simulation of contemporary and near-future tactical, ground, combat between the modern armed forces of the world.
- Wargame: Red Dragon – (Eugen Systems, 2014) – a 3D regiment or brigade scale simulation set as a "Cold War Gone Hot" themed game in both multiplayer and singleplayer environments. Players construct customized armies through use of a deck system comprising land vehicles, infantry, and helicopters from several NATO and Warsaw Pact nations and manage logistics such as fuel and ammunition while on the battlefield. There is no cohesive campaign, the game instead taking place in several hypothetical conflicts.
- Hegemony - (Longbow Games) - a series of historical wargames set in antiquity, with real-time strategy and real time battles on one seamless map, notable for its elegant supply system.
- Ultimate General - a series of strategy wargames based on the American Civil War
- Total War – a wargame set in different time periods, with a turn based map, and a real time battle component, featured on the television series Time Commanders
- Hearts of Iron – (Paradox Interactive) − a grand strategy wargame series that is focused on World War 2. Player may act as any reasonably sized nation at the time, influencing international politics, economic and military development, and can control battlefields on both strategic and operational levels using combined arms. Frequently used to entertain and simulate alternative history scenarios as well as recreate historical events.
- DEFCON (video game) - (Introversion Software)

== See also ==
- Chronology of grand strategy video games
