= List of turn-based tactics video games =

Turn-based tactics is a video game genre. Chris Crawford, Julian Gollop, Strategic Simulations, and Blue Byte developed early turn-based tactical games, which were often inspired by traditional tactical wargames played on tabletops. Because of their low system requirements, turn-based tactical games were popular on early personal computers. This peaked with the released of X-COM: UFO Defense in 1994. When X-COM's sequels failed to make the same impression, publishers grew cautious of funding similar games on personal computers.

As the 1990s continued, 3D graphics grew popular, and gamers increasingly turned to real time strategy games. Though new tactics games continued to be released on personal computers, tactical combat became more of a component in tactical role-playing games, and tactical games grew more popular on handheld consoles. These complex but accessible games widened the appeal of turn-based tactics. The 2012 release of XCOM: Enemy Unknown, a remake of the 1994 video game, reinvigorated the genre on personal computers and led to many new games using streamlined, modern rules.

== Legend ==
Video game platforms
3DS	Nintendo 3DS, 3DS Virtual Console, iQue 3DS	AMI	Amiga	AMI32	Amiga CD32
APPII	Apple II	ATR	Atari 8-bit computers	ATRST	Atari ST, Atari Falcon
C64	Commodore 64	CPC	Amstrad CPC	DOS	PC DOS / MS-DOS, Windows 3.X
DROID	Android	DS	Nintendo DS, DSiWare, iQue DS	GB	Game Boy
GBA	Game Boy Advance, iQue GBA	GBC	Game Boy Color	GCN	GameCube
GEN	Genesis / Mega Drive	iOS	iOS, iPhone, iPod, iPadOS, iPad, visionOS, Apple Vision Pro	LIN	Linux, SteamOS
MAC	Classic Mac OS, 2001 and before	MOBI	Mobile phone	MSX	MSX
NES	Nintendo Entertainment System / Famicom	NGE	N-Gage	NX	(replace with NS)
OSX	macOS	PC98	PC-9800 series	PCE	TurboGrafx-16 / PC Engine
PET	Commodore PET	PPC	Pocket PC	PS1	PlayStation 1
PS2	PlayStation 2	PS3	PlayStation 3	PS4	PlayStation 4
PS5	PlayStation 5	PSP	PlayStation Portable	PSV	PlayStation Vita
SNES	Super NES / Super Famicom / Super Comboy	Stadia	Google Stadia	TRS80	TRS-80
Wii	Wii, WiiWare, Wii Virtual Console	WIN	Windows, all versions Windows 95 and up	WIN3X	Term not found
X360	(replace with XB360)	X68K	X68000	XBOX	(replace with XB)
XOne	(replace with XBO)	XSX/S	(replace with XBX/S)	ZX	ZX Spectrum

Types of releases
Compilation	A compilation, anthology or collection of several titles, usually (but not always) belonging to the same series
Early access	A game launched in early access is unfinished and thus might contain bugs and glitches or have some of the content missing
Episodic	An episodic video game that is released in batches over a period of time
Expansion	A large-scale DLC to an already existing game that adds new story, areas and additions and/or changes to the game's mechanics
Full release	A full release of a game that launched in early access first
Limited	A special release (often called "Limited" or "Collector's Edition") with bonus collector's material. Often provided to people who pre-order a game
Port	The game first appeared on a different platform and a port was made. The game is like the original, with few or no differences
Remake	The game is an enhanced remake of an original, made using a new engine and/or assets and thus containing completely new sound, graphics and possibly changes to the story and/or gameplay
Remaster	The game is a remaster of an original, released on the same or different platform, with (usually minor) changes to graphics, sound and/or gameplay
Rerelease	The game was re-released on the same platform with no or only minor changes

== List of released games ==
Year	Title	Developer	Setting	Platform	Notes
1978	Tanktics	Chris Crawford	Historical	APPII, ATR, PET, TRS80	
1981	Eastern Front (1941)	Chris Crawford	Historical	ATR	First computer game with a scrolling map
1983	Godzilla	Code Works	Sci-fi	C64	
1983	Nobunaga's Ambition	Koei	Historical	GB, GEN, MSX, NES, SNES	First title in the series.
1984	Rebelstar Raiders	Julian Gollop	Sci-fi	ZX	
1985	Under Fire!	Avalon Hill	Historical	AMI, C64, DOS	
1985	Chaos: The Battle of Wizards	Games Workshop	Fantasy	ZX	
1985	Kampfgruppe	SSI	Historical	AMI, APPII, ATR, C64, DOS	
1985	Mech Brigade	SSI	Alternate history	APPII, ATR, C64, DOS	
1986	Gettysburg: The Turning Point	SSI	Historical	AMI, APPII, ATR, C64, DOS	
1986	Ogre	Origin Systems	Sci-fi	APPII, AMI, ATR, ATRST, C64, DOS, MAC	Based on the 1977 wargame
1986	Rebelstar	Julian Gollop	Sci-fi	ZX, CPC	
1987	Breach	Omnitrend Software	Sci-fi	AMI, ATRST, DOS	
1987	Panzer Strike	SSI	Historical	APPII, C64	
1988	Famicom Wars	Intelligent	Sci-fi	NES	First title in the Nintendo Wars series.
1988	Grand Fleet	Simulations Canada	Historical	AMI, DOS, ATRST	
1988	Laser Squad	Target	Sci-fi	AMI, C64, CPC, DOS, ATRST, ZX	By the makers of X-COM: UFO Defense.
1988	Rebelstar II	Julian Gollop	Sci-fi	ZX	
1989	Desert Commander	Kemco	Historical	NES	
1989	Fire Brigade	Panther	Historical	AMI, DOS, MAC, ATRST	
1989	Military Madness	Hudson	Sci-fi	DROID, DOS, PC98, PS1, PCE, X68K	a.k.a. Nectaris
1990	Breach 2	Omnitrend Software	Sci-fi	AMI, ATRST, DOS	
1990	Lords of Chaos	Julian Gollop	Fantasy	AMI, C64, CPC, ATRST, ZX	
1990	Renegade Legion: Interceptor	Strategic Simulations	Sci-fi	AMI, DOS	Based on Renegade Legion
1991	Game Boy Wars	Intelligent	Sci-fi	GB	First title in this sub-series of Nintendo Wars.
1991	The Perfect General	Mark Baldwin	Historical	AMI, DOS	First title in the series.
1991	RoboSport	Maxis	Sci-fi	AMI, DOS, MAC, WIN	4-player squad combat with simultaneous turns.
1991	Battle Isle	Blue Byte	Sci-fi	AMI, DOS	
1992	Gemfire	Koei	Fantasy	DOS, GEN, MSX, NES, SNES	
1992	History Line: 1914-1918	Blue Byte	Historical	AMI, DOS	a.k.a. Great War: 1914-1918
1992	Sabre Team	Krisalis	Contemporary	AMI, AMI32, DOS, ATRST	
1992	Tegel's Mercenaries	Mindcraft	Sci-fi	DOS	First title in the series.
1993	The Grandest Fleet	Fogstone	Historical	DOS	
1993	Metal Marines	Namco	Contemporary	WIN3X, SNES	
1993	Patriot	Artech	Historical	DOS	
1993	Strike Squad	Mindcraft	Sci-fi	DOS	
1993	Taskforce	Mark Sheeky	Sci-fi	AMI	
1994	UFO: Enemy Unknown	Mythos	Sci-fi	AMI, AMI32, DOS, PS1, WIN	a.k.a. X-COM: UFO Defense; first XCOM
1994	Panzer General	SSI	Historical	DOS	First title in the series.
1994	Jagged Alliance	Madlab	Contemporary	DOS	First title in the series.
1994	The Perfect General II	Mark Baldwin	Historical	AMI, DOS	
1995	Front Mission	Square	Sci-Fi	SNES, PS1	First title in the series.
1995	Steel Panthers	SSI	Historical	DOS	
1995	Tactics Ogre	Quest Corporation	Fantasy	PS1	
1995	X-COM: Terror from the Deep	MicroProse	Sci-fi	DOS, PS1, WIN	Part of the XCOM series
1996	MissionForce: CyberStorm	Dynamix	Sci-fi	WIN	
1996	Over the Reich	Big Time Software	Historical	MAC, WIN	
1996	Steel Panthers II: Modern Battles	SSI	Historical	DOS	
1996	Vandal Hearts	Konami	Fantasy	PS1	
1997	Achtung Spitfire!	Big Time Software	Historical	WIN	Prequel to Over the Reich.
1997	Demonworld	Ikarion	Fantasy	WIN	First title in the series.
1997	Fallen Haven	Micomeq	Fantasy	WIN	First title in the series.
1997	Final Liberation: Warhammer Epic 40,000	Holistic	Sci-fi	WIN	
1997	Final Fantasy Tactics	Square	Fantasy	PS1	
1997	Front Mission 2	Square	Sci-Fi	PS1	Part of the Front Mission series.
1997	Game Boy Wars Turbo	Hudson	Sci-fi	GB	Part of the Nintendo Wars series.
1997	Incubation: Time Is Running Out	Blue Byte	Sci-fi	WIN	Spin-off of Battle Isle.
1997	Steel Panthers III	SSI	Historical	DOS, WIN	
1997	X-COM: Apocalypse	Mythos	Sci-fi	DOS, WIN	Part of the XCOM series. Option to use real-time.
1998	101: The Airborne Invasion of Normandy	Interactive Simulations	Historical	WIN	
1998	CyberStorm 2: Corporate Wars	Dynamix	Sci-fi	WIN	
1998	Game Boy Wars 2	Hudson	Sci-fi	GBC	Part of the Nintendo Wars series.
1998	Liberation Day	Micomeq	Fantasy	WIN	Sequel to Fallen Haven.
1998	Soldiers at War	Random	Historical	WIN	
1998	Super Famicom Wars	Intelligent	Sci-fi	SNES	Part of the Nintendo Wars series.
1998	Warhammer 40,000: Chaos Gate	Random	Sci-fi	WIN	
1999	Front Mission 3	Square	Sci-Fi	PS1	Part of the Front Mission series.
1999	Gorky 17 (Odium)	Metropolis Software	Sci-fi	WIN, LIN, OSX	
1999	Jagged Alliance 2	Sir-Tech	Contemporary	OSX, LIN, WIN	
1999	Saiyuki: Journey West	Koei	Fantasy	PS1	
2000	Avalon Hill's Squad Leader	Random	Historical	WIN	
2000	Combat Mission: Beyond Overlord	Battlefront.com	Historical	MAC, WIN	First title in the series.
2000	Hogs of War	Infogrames, Sheffield House	Fantasy	PS1, WIN	Also features artillery game elements.
2000	Ring of Red	Konami	Alternate history	PS2	
2000	Shadow Watch	Red Storm	Sci-fi	WIN	
2000	Steel Panthers: World at War	Matrix	Historical	WIN	Remake of Steel Panthers
2001	Advance Wars	Intelligent	Sci-fi	GBA	First title in this sub-series of Nintendo Wars.
2001	Etherlords	Nival Interactive	Fantasy	WIN	Card battle game
2001	Fallout Tactics	Micro Forté	Sci-fi	WIN	Spin-off of Fallout. Option to use real-time.
2001	Game Boy Wars 3	Hudson	Sci-fi	GBC	Part of the Nintendo Wars series.
2002	Combat Mission II	Battlefront.com	Historical	WIN	
2002	Dynasty Tactics	Koei	Historical	PS2	First title in the series.
2002	Laser Squad Nemesis	Codo	Sci-fi	WIN	By the makers of X-COM: UFO Defense.
2002	Paradise Cracked	MiST Land South	Sci-fi	WIN	
2003	Advance Wars 2	Intelligent	Sci-fi	GBA	Part of the Nintendo Wars series.
2003	Combat Mission 3	Battlefront.com	Historical	WIN	
2003	Dai Senryaku VII	SystemSoft	Historical	XBOX	
2003	Dynasty Tactics 2	Koei	Historical	PS2	
2003	Etherlords II	Nival Interactive	Fantasy	WIN	Card battle game. Sequel to Etherlords.
2003	Massive Assault	Wargaming	Sci-fi	WIN	
2003	Final Fantasy Tactics Advance	Square Enix	Action	GBA	
2003	Front Mission 4	Square Enix	Sci-Fi	PS2	Part of the Front Mission series.
2003	Silent Storm	Nival	Alternate history	WIN	First title in the series.
2004	Ancient Empires	Macrospace	Fantasy	MOBI	First title in the series.
2004	Cops 2170: The Power of Law	MiST Land South	Sci-fi	WIN	
2004	Future Tactics: The Uprising	Zed Two	Sci-fi	GCN, PS2, WIN, XBOX	
2004	The Lord of the Rings: The Third Age	Griptonite Games	Fantasy	GBA	
2004	Pathway to Glory	Ubisoft RedLynx	Historical	NGE	
2004	Yu Yu Hakusho: Tournament Tactics	Sensory Sweep	Fantasy	GBA	Based on the anime series YuYu Hakusho.
2005	Advance Wars: Dual Strike	Intelligent	Sci-fi	DS	Part of the Nintendo Wars series.
2005	Ancient Empires II	Macrospace	Fantasy	MOBI	
2005	Battles of Prince of Persia	Ubisoft	Fantasy	DS	
2005	Domination	Wargaming	Sci-fi	WIN	First title in the series.
2005	Flashpoint Germany	Simulations Canada	Historical	WIN	
2005	Hammer & Sickle	Novik&Co, Nival	Alternate history	WIN	Successor to Silent Storm.
2005	High Seize	RedLynx	Historical	NGE	
2005	Night Watch	Nival	Contemporary	WIN	Based on the novel of the same name.
2004	Pathway to Glory: Ikusa Islands	Ubisoft RedLynx	Historical	NGE	Sequel to Pathway to Glory
2005	Front Mission 2089	Square Enix	Sci-Fi	MOBI	Part of the Front Mission series.
2005	Front Mission 5: Scars of the War	Square Enix	Sci-Fi	PS2	Part of the Front Mission series.
2005	Rebelstar: Tactical Command	Codo	Sci-fi	GBA	
2005	Shattered Union	PopTop	Alternate history	WIN, XBOX	
2005	The Battle for Wesnoth		Fantasy		
2006	Field Commander	SOE	Sci-fi	PSP	
2006	Pocket UFO	SMK Software	Sci-fi	PPC	Clone of X-COM: UFO Defense.
2007	Band of Bugs	NinjaBee	Fantasy	WIN, X360	
2007	Fantasy Wars	Ino-Co Plus	Fantasy	WIN	
2007	Panzer Tactics DS	Sproing Interactive	Historical	DS	
2007	UFO: Extraterrestrials	Chaos Concept	Sci-fi	WIN	Spiritual successor to X-COM: UFO Defense.
2007	Warhammer 40,000: Squad Command	Ubisoft RedLynx	Sci-fi	PSP, DS	
2007	Hired Guns: The Jagged Edge	GFI Russia	Contemporary	WIN	
2008	Commanders: Attack of the Genos	Southend Interactive	Alternate history	X360	
2008	Advance Wars: Days of Ruin	Intelligent	Sci-fi	DS	Stand alone part of the Nintendo Wars series.
2009	Blood Bowl	Cyanide	Fantasy	WIN	Based on the board game Blood Bowl.
2009	Dragon Quest Wars	Intelligent Systems	Fantasy	DS	
2008	Front Mission 2089: Border of Madness	Square Enix	Sci-Fi	DS	Part of the Front Mission series. Remake of the mobile version launched in 2005.
2009	Military Madness: Nectaris	Backbone Entertainment	Sci-fi	X360, PS3, Wii	
2009	Mytran Wars	StormRegion	Sci-fi	PSP	
2010	Jagged Alliance: Back in Action	bitComposer Games	Contemporary	WIN	Remake of Jagged Alliance 2
2010	BBC Battle Academy	Slitherine Software	Historical	WIN, MAC, iOS	
2010	Battle Dex	Bandera Games	Contemporary	WIN	Card battle game
2011	Frozen Synapse	Mode 7 Games	Sci-fi	WIN, MAC, LIN, iOS, DROID	
2011	Tom Clancy's Ghost Recon: Shadow Wars	Ubisoft Sofia	Contemporary	3DS	
2012	XCOM: Enemy Unknown	Firaxis Games	Sci-fi	WIN, MAC, LIN, PS3, X360, PSV	Remake of a classical X-COM: UFO Defense.
2012	Call of Cthulhu: The Wasted Land	Red Wasp Design	Alternate history	WIN, MOBI	Based on works of H. P. Lovecraft
2013	Arma Tactics	Bohemia Interactive	Contemporary	WIN, LIN, OSX, DROID, iOS	
2013	Leviathan: Warships	Pisces Interactive	Sci-fi	WIN, OSX, DROID, iOS	
2013	Space Hulk	Full Control	Sci-fi	WIN, MAC	Based on the board game Space Hulk.
2013	Skulls of the Shogun	17-Bit	Historical	WIN, MOBI, X360, MAC, PS4, NX	
2014	Xenonauts	Goldhawk Interactive	Sci-fi	WIN	
2014	Battle Academy 2: Eastern Front	Slitherine Software	Historical	WIN, MAC, iOS	Sequel to BBC Battle Academy
2014	Blood Bowl Tablet	Cyanide	Fantasy	iOS, DROID	Tablet adaptation of Blood Bowl
2014	Invisible, Inc.	Klei Entertainment	Sci-fi	WIN, MAC, LIN, PS4, iOS	Stealth tactics in an espionage setting.
2014	Panzer Tactics HD	Sproing Interactive	Historical	WIN, iOS	
2014	Jagged Alliance: Flashback	Full Control	Contemporary	WIN, LIN, MAC	Part of the Jagged Alliance series.
2014	Space Hulk: Ascension	Full Control	Sci-fi	WIN, LIN, MAC	Based on the board game Space Hulk.
2014	Halfway	Robotality	Sci-fi	LIN, MAC, WIN	
2014	Qvadriga	Turnopia	Historical	DROID, iOS, WIN	Chariot racing game
2015	Hard West	CreativeForge Games	Horror	LIN, MAC, WIN, PS4, NX	
2015	Massive Chalice	Double Fine	Fantasy	LIN, MAC, WIN, XOne	
2015	Warhammer 40,000: Deathwatch	Rodeo Games	Sci-fi	iOS, WIN, PS4	
2015	Blood Bowl 2	Cyanide	Fantasy	MAC, WIN, PS4, XOne	
2016	Warbits	Risky Lab	Sci-fi	iOS	
2016	XCOM 2	Firaxis Games	Sci-fi	WIN, MAC, LIN, PS4, XOne, NX	Sequel of XCOM: Enemy Unknown.
2017	Battlestar Galactica: Deadlock	Black Lab Games	Sci-fi	WIN, PS4, XOne, NX	
2017	Mario + Rabbids Kingdom Battle	Ubisoft	Fantasy	NX	
2017	Tiny Metal	Area 35	Contemporary	WIN, NX, PS4	
2018	Achtung! Cthulhu Tactics	Auroch Digital	Sci-fi, Fantasy	WIN, NX, XOne, PS4	
2018	Attack of the Earthlings	Team Junkfish	Sci-fi	WIN, PS4, XOne	
2018	Into the Breach	Subset Games	Sci-fi	WIN, MAC, LIN, NX, Stadia	
2018	BattleTech	Harebrained Schemes	Sci-fi	WIN	
2018	Chessaria: The Tactical Adventure	Pixel Wizards	Fantasy	WIN, MAC	
2018	Phantom Doctrine	CreativeForge Games	Alternate history	WIN, XOne, PS4, NX	Strategic turn-based espionage thriller.
2018	Warhammer 40,000: Mechanicus	Bulwark Studios	Sci-fi	WIN, LIN, MAC	
2018	Jagged Alliance: Rage!	Cliffhanger Productions	Contemporary	WIN, PS4, XOne	Set 20 years after the first Jagged Alliance.
2018	Mutant Year Zero: Road to Eden	The Bearded Ladies	Sci-fi	WIN, PS4, XOne	
2018	Space Hulk: Tactics	Cyanide	Sci-fi	WIN, PS4, XOne	
2018	Football, Tactics & Glory	Creoteam	Contemporary	WIN	Sports game
2018	All Walls Must Fall	Inbetweengames	Sci-fi	WIN	
2018	Frozen Synapse 2	Mode 7 Games	Sci-fi	WIN, MAC, LIN, iOS, DROID	
2019	Wargroove	Chucklefish	Fantasy	WIN, XOne, PS4, NX, Stadia	
2019	Pathway	Robotality	Sci-fi	LIN, MAC, WIN, NX	
2019	Druidstone	Ctrl Alt Ninja	Fantasy	WIN	
2019	Phoenix Point	Snapshot Games	Sci-fi	WIN, MAC, XOne, PS4, Stadia	
2019	Age of Wonders: Planetfall	Triumph Studios	Sci-fi	WIN, PS4, XOne, MAC	4X game with turn-based, tactical battles
2019	Rebel Cops	Weappy Studio	Contemporary	WIN, MAC, LIN, PS4, XOne, NX, DROID, iOS	
2020	Corruption 2029	The Bearded Ladies	Sci-fi	WIN	
2020	Gears Tactics	Splash Damage, The Coalition	Sci-fi	WIN, XOne, XSX/S	
2020	XCOM: Chimera Squad	Firaxis Games	Sci-fi	WIN	
2020	Treachery in Beatdown City	NuChallenger, HurakanWorks	Contemporary	WIN, NX	Mix of real-time brawling and turn-based tactics
2020	Necromunda: Underhive Wars	Rogue Factor	Sci-fi	WIN, PS4, XOne	
2020	Fort Triumph	CookieByte Entertainment	Fantasy	WIN, MAC, LIN, PS4, XOne, NX	Mix of turn-based tactics and strategy game
2021	Warhammer 40,000: Battlesector	Black Lab Games	Sci-fi	WIN, PS4, XOne, XSX/S	
2022	Front Mission 1st: Remake	Forever Entertainment	Sci-Fi	SWITCH, WIN, PS4, PS5, XOne, XSX/S	Part of the Front Mission series. Remake of Front Mission launched in 1995.
2022	Hard West 2	Ice Code Games	Horror	WIN	
2022	Desta: The Memories Between	Ustwo	Fantasy	WIN, NX, DROID, iOS	
2022	Marvel's Midnight Suns	Firaxis Games	Sci-fi	PS5, WIN, XSX/S, PS4, XOne	
2022	Mario + Rabbids Sparks of Hope	Ubisoft	Fantasy	NX	Sequel to Mario + Rabbids Kingdom Battle
2022	WH40K: Chaos Gate - Daemonhunters	Complex Games	Scifi	WIN	
2023	Front Mission 2: Remake	Storm Trident	Sci-Fi	SWITCH, WIN, PS4, PS5, XOne, XSX/S	Part of the Front Mission series. Remake of Front Mission 2 launched in 1997.
2023	Showgunners	Artificer	Sci-fi	WIN	
2023	Jagged Alliance 3	Haemimont Games	Contemporary	WIN, PS4, PS5, XSX/S	Sequel to Jagged Alliance 2
2023	Miasma Chronicles	The Bearded Ladies	Sci-fi	WIN, PS5, XSX/S	
2023	Blood Bowl 3	Cyanide	Fantasy	PS4, PS5, WIN, XOne, XSX/S	
2023	Fights in Tight Spaces	Ground Shatter	Contemporary	WIN, XOne, XSX/S, NX, PS4, PS5	Mix of deckbuilding and turn-based tactics
2023	The Lamplighters League	Harebrained Schemes	Alternate history	WIN, XOne, XSX/S	
2023	Phantom Brigade	Brace Yourself Games	Sci-fi	WIN	
2025	Front Mission 3: Remake	MegaPixel Studio	Sci-Fi	SWITCH, WIN, PS4, PS5, XOne, XSX/S	Part of the Front Mission series. Remake of Front Mission 3 launched in 1999.
TBA	Crimson Fields		Sci-fi		Open source clone of Battle Isle.
TBA	Kriegsfront Tactics	Toge Productions	Sci-fi		Spiritual successor of Front Mission.
TBA	UFO: Alien Invasion		Sci-fi		Open source clone of X-COM: UFO Defense.

== See also ==
- List of tactical role-playing video games
- List of real-time tactics video games
- List of turn-based strategy video games
