= 101: The Airborne Invasion of Normandy =

1998 video game

- Developer: Interactive Simulations
- Publisher: Empire Interactive
- Platform: Windows
- Release: October 1998
- Genres: Turn-based tactics, computer wargame
- Mode: Single-player

101: The Airborne Invasion of Normandy is a 1998 computer wargame developed by Interactive Simulations and published by Empire Interactive. Key members of the team had previously worked at Random Games, developer of Soldiers at War and Wages of War.

== Gameplay ==
101: The Airborne Invasion of Normandy is a turn-based computer wargame that simulates combat at the squad level, in a manner that has been compared to games such as X-COM. The game recreates the 101st Airborne Division's use of paratroopers during the Invasion of Normandy in World War II.

== Development ==
101 was developed by Interactive Simulations, Inc. (ISI), a team started by former members of Random Games, creator of Soldiers at War and Wages of War. ISI president Tim Brooks said that he founded the studio to obtain "more control over deciding what went into the game and what didn't go into the game." 101 was released in October 1998.

== Reception ==
Reception

Review scores
Publication	Score
Computer Games Strategy Plus	4.5/5
Computer Gaming World	2/5
GameSpot	8.8/10
PC Gamer (US)	80%
PC Gaming World	4/10

101 sold 10,000 copies in the United States by April 1999, according to Tim Brooks. James Fudge of Computer Games Strategy Plus called the game "semi-popular" by that time, while Wargamer's Mario Kroll dubbed it a commercial flop in 2003. He explained that it had failed to secure the retail shelf space necessary to succeed: "copies of the game weren't available over Christmas after the release, and shortly thereafter its developer went belly-up, completely abandoned by its publisher", he wrote. Kroll noted that 101's distribution issues were part of a trend for less established development teams at the time.

According to Kroll, 101 "received plenty of positive press". CNET Gamecenter, GameSpot and Computer Games Strategy Plus nominated it for their respective "Wargame of the Year" prizes, which went variously to The Operational Art of War I: 1939–1955 and People's General.

In Computer Games Strategy Plus, David Finn offered 101 a glowing review and hailed it as "probably the first tactical squad level wargame with this scope of realism and detail." William R. Trotter of PC Gamer US was also positive. Writing for GameSpot, Alan Dunkin remarked, "While the scope is limited and the level of detail can intimidate some, 101: The Airborne Invasion of Normandy is a winner."

Tim Carter of Computer Gaming World and Ian Marsh of Britain's PC Gaming World were critical of 101. Marsh argued that "the gameplay sucks", a complaint largely echoed by Carter: he wrote that the design "might be realistic, but it makes for a lousy game—especially with the incredible number of technical flaws that you are subjected to."

== See also ==
- Avalon Hill's Squad Leader
