= Wargroove 2 =

2023 video game

- Developers: Chucklefish; Robotality
- Publisher: Chucklefish
- Producer: Caoimhe Roddy
- Designers: Stefan Bachmann; Simon Bachman
- Artists: Simon Bachman; Lucas Carvalho
- Composer: Dale North
- Platforms: Nintendo Switch; Windows; Xbox One; Xbox Series X/S; Android; iOS
- Release: Switch, Windows; 5 October 2023; Xbox One & X/S; 19 September 2024; Android, iOS; 30 July 2025
- Genre: Turn-based tactics
- Modes: Single-player, multiplayer

Wargroove 2 is a 2023 turn-based tactics video game developed by Chucklefish and Robotality. The game is a sequel to Wargroove and received generally favorable reviews.

== Gameplay ==
Wargroove 2 is, like its predecessor Wargroove, a turn-based tactics game in the style of Nintendo Wars. In each level, the player is presented with a 2D grid based map, on which they gather resources, use resources to recruit units, and use units to fight enemies. An important element of gameplay is the rock-paper-scissors nature of combat, where units are more effective against certain enemy units and can inflict critical hits if used in certain conditions. Gameplay is largely unchanged between the games, though new units and commanders have been added. The game reintroduces the "groove" system from the first game, where commanders charge up for every action taken. When charged, they can activate a special ability. Compared to the first game, Wargroove 2 adds a second tier to the "grooves", where further charging them leads to a second, more powerful, tier of ability.

The primary game mode of Wargroove 2 is single-player campaigns. The campaigns are divided into a prologue that serves as a tutorial, three campaigns focusing on the story of a different faction, and a final series of missions that connects the stories of the previous campaigns.

The game also introduces Conquest, a roguelike game mode featuring procedurally generated maps. In each Conquest campaign, the player selects a commander and starting units, then proceeds through a set of battles. Unlike in the normal campaign, damaged or lost units carry over between battles, and between battles the player has the opportunity to recruit new units or purchase special items.

Also returning from the first game are both co-op and competitive multiplayer, which are played as skirmishes on dedicated maps. The level and campaign editors were also reintroduced and improved.

== Development ==
Wargroove 2 was developed by British studio Chucklefish, the developer of Wargroove, and Robotality, a German studio which had previously developed Pathway and Halfway. It was published by Chucklefish, and released for Windows and Nintendo Switch on 5 October 2023, Xbox One and Xbox Series X/S on 19 September 2024, and for Android and iOS on 30 July 2025. Its soundtrack was produced by Dale North.

Comparing their work on the sequel to developing a new game, lead designer Stefan Bachmann commented that the studio tried to keep the essence of the first game, while making the sequel feel like a new game. Chucklefish and Robotality were in contact throughout the development process, allowing the developer to debate ideas with the studio behind the first game, and to eliminate new ideas that didn't work with the game. Bachmann commented that the partnership with an existing larger studio and game franchise gave Robotality an advantage in the competitive indie game development scene.

== Reception ==
Reception

Aggregate score
Aggregator	Score
Metacritic	PC: 82/100; NS: 85/100

Review scores
Publication	Score
IGN	8/10
Nintendo Life	9/10
Nintendo World Report	9/10
PC Gamer (US)	81/100
TechRadar	4/5
TouchArcade	4.5/5
Multiplayer.it	8.5/10

Wargroove 2 received "generally favorable" reviews according to review aggregator Metacritic.

Many reviewers found that the core gameplay was largely unchanged from Wargroove, but did not find this to be a flaw of the game. According to Touch Arcade, "that game was kind of amazing so I think that’s fine". The game contains much more content than its predecessor, with IGN describing it as "massive", and PC Gamer describing it as "a lot of game". The design of the campaigns was praised, with reviewers citing the freedom available to the player in completing missions, the variety in mission and map design, and the variety and replay value created by the objective system. Nintendo World Report found that the game was the best modern adaptation of the Advance Wars style of game.

Several praised the new Conquest mode. Nintendo Life commented that it added gameplay and would be appealing to fans of roguelikes. Nintendo World Report described the mode as the game's most compelling feature, offering a new way to experience the game. TechRadar described the mode as an "exciting change of pace". Some were less positive: PC Gamer found that the mode, despite being well produced, was less fun due to the possibility of losing units without knowing they would be important in the future. Multiplayer.it was furthermore critical, describing the roguelike gameplay as eliminating the best parts of Wargroove by discouraging the player from fighting. Compared to Conquest, the publication also preferred the game modes that had been present in the first game.

Tech Radar praised the art and visual design of the game, highlighting the pixel art style, unit animations, and map backgrounds that represent the game's geographical areas. Touch Arcade described the game's presentation as "charming", citing its art, soundtrack, and writing. PC Gamer also found the writing appealing, commenting that the game knew how to balance its serious story with humor. IGN found that breaking the campaign into parts improved introducing the player to each of the game's factions, but at the cost of making the overarching story less coherent.
