= Mode 7 (disambiguation) =

Mode 7 is a graphics mode on the Super Nintendo Entertainment System video game console.

Mode 7 may also refer to:

- Mode 7 Games, a British video game developer and publisher
- Mode 7, the Teletext-compatible video mode available on the BBC Micro, noted for its colourful, blocky pseudo-graphics
- The Game Boy division of the Cracking Group Fairlight
