= Starmancer =

2021 video game

- Developer: Ominux Games
- Publisher: Chucklefish
- Programmer: Tyler Millershaski
- Artist: Victor Seiseki
- Composer: Dirk Kluesing
- Engine: Unity
- Platforms: Windows, macOS, Linux
- Release: August 21, 2021
- Genre: Construction and management simulation
- Mode: Single-player

Starmancer is a 2021 construction and management simulation game developed by Ominux Games and published by Chucklefish. It was released into early access for Microsoft Windows, macOS, and Linux on August 21, 2021. Its game state is viewed from an isometric perspective, taking place in a procedurally generated galaxy.

== Gameplay ==
In Starmancer, the player plays as a Starmancer Core, which is a human-artificial intelligence hybrid who has been irreversibly fused with their core. The game emphasizes player freedom, with the main objective of the game being the preservation of the Starmancer Core and station. Unlike typical colony-management games, Starmancer does not end when all colonists are dead, instead giving the player the ability to create new ones at will.

== Development ==
Starmancer was officially unveiled via Kickstarter on February 12, 2018 and achieved full funding within three days. On April 2, 2018, Ominux added an additional programmer to the team, who quietly left the project shortly before the game was shown at E3 2019. The game was shown off again at E3 2021, with an early access release date of August 5, 2021. The game is being published by Chucklefish.
