= Tokyo 42 =

2017 video game

- Developer: Smac Games
- Publisher: Mode 7 Games
- Platforms: Microsoft Windows; Xbox One; PlayStation 4
- Release: Microsoft Windows, Xbox One: WW: May 31, 2017; PlayStation 4: WW: August 15, 2017
- Genre: Action
- Modes: Single-player, multiplayer

Tokyo 42 is an action video game developed by Smac Games and published by Mode 7 Games, released on May 31, 2017, for Microsoft Windows and Xbox One platforms along with a two part official soundtrack by Beat Vince, and released on August 15, 2017 for PlayStation 4. The player takes the role of an assassin and uses attacks, dodges and stealth to pursue targets. The game is presented in a minimalist, low-poly, isometric perspective.

== Gameplay ==
The gameplay experience of Tokyo 42 can be likened to that of a shoot 'em up game; The player must be aware of their surroundings as it is likely that enemy bullets will be coming in from multiple directions.

The player has a variety of weapons at their arsenal, from sniper rifles to grenades and even melee weapons such as Katanas.

The camera angle can be rotated clockwise or counter clockwise by pressing "E" and "Q"' respectively.

== Story ==
The main premise of the story is that the player plays as an inhabitant of an ultra futuristic version of the Japanese city Tokyo who is framed for murder. The player escapes a police chase in the tutorial and is now officially a wanted criminal on the run. The player's friend tells the player of a good way to exact revenge on the assassin that framed you, which is to become an assassin yourself and rise the ranks to eventually be able to take them down.

== Soundtrack ==
The release of the game was accompanied by an official two part soundtrack by Beat Vince. The feature track "Go Go Go (feat. Genevieve Artadi)" was very well received in the indie music community.

All music is composed by Beat Vince.

Part 1
No.	Title	Length
1.	"Tokyo 42"	1:59
2.	"Go Go Go (Instrumental)"	3:09
3.	"Everything in its Place"	2:48
4.	"Kyrie"	4:20
5.	"Nanomed Overture"	1:55
6.	"Arrival"	1:44
7.	"Title Screen"	1:06
8.	"Go Go Go" (ft. Genevieve Artadi)	3:09

All music is composed by Beat Vince.

Part 2
No.	Title	Length
1.	"Prologue"	2:31
2.	"Prologue Alert"	1:23
3.	"Nudist Colony"	2:25
4.	"Nudist Colony Alert"	1:02
5.	"Central Pt. I"	6:02
6.	"Nakatomi Pt. I"	3:13
7.	"Nakatomi Alert"	1:33
8.	"Temple"	2:40
9.	"Temple Alert"	2:35
10.	"Central Pt. II"	2:51
11.	"Nakatomi Pt II"	1:25
12.	"Central Alert"	1:20
13.	"Kowloon Alert"	3:02
14.	"Kowloon"	5:55
15.	"Cathedral"	6:27
16.	"The Factory Alert"	0:18
17.	"The Factory"	3:14
18.	"Coded Signals Speaker"	0:28
19.	"Coded Signals"	2:10

== Reception ==
Reception

Aggregate score
Aggregator	Score
Metacritic	71/100

Review scores
Publication	Score
Destructoid	8.5/10
Eurogamer	Recommended
GameSpot	7/10
IGN	6.5/10
PC Gamer (US)	69%

Tokyo 42 has received mildly positive reception. The game is consistently praised for its highly stylized isometric visuals depicting future Tokyo. However, is often criticized for its difficult gun controls as well as its odd camera angles. According to review aggregator platform Metacritic,Tokyo 42 received "mixed and average" reviews from critics. IGN gave the game a 6.5/10 commending the game’s world and style, but criticizing the game’s seemingly inconsistent combat. Destructoid gave the game a 8.5/10 with high praise for the game’s aesthetic which is slightly soured by the camera difficulty.
