= List of tactical role-playing video games =

This is a comprehensive index of commercial tactical role-playing games (Tactical RPGs), sorted chronologically by year. Information regarding release platform, release type, game setting, developers, publishers, and country of origin is provided where available. The table can be sorted by clicking on the small boxes next to the column headings.

== See also ==
- Lists of video games
- List of turn-based tactics video games
- List of real-time tactics video games
- List of turn-based tactics video games
