= Loco Motive (video game) =

2024 video game

- Developer: Robust Games
- Publisher: Chucklefish
- Designers: Adam Riches; Joseph Riches
- Writers: Adam Riches; Joseph Riches; Elliot Herriman
- Composer: Paul Zimmermann
- Engine: Unity
- Platforms: Windows; Nintendo Switch
- Release: November 21, 2024
- Genre: Point-and-click adventure
- Mode: Single-player

Loco Motive is a 2024 point-and-click adventure game, developed by Robust Games and published by Chucklefish. The story sees players assume the role of three different protagonists, as they work to unravel a mystery concerning the murder of an elderly wealthy heiress aboard her luxury train service, meeting a variety of different characters and suspects. The game was released for Nintendo Switch and Windows.

== Gameplay ==
Loco Motive is a 2D point-and-click adventure game. The objective is to move the story forward by solving puzzles. This can be done by exploring locations, talking to non-player characters to acquire information, collecting items and using them at the right time. The player takes on the roles of three different characters, each with their own perspective on the events.

== Plot ==
Wealthy heiress Lady Unterwald, owner of a railroad company that runs a luxury service known as the "Reuss Express", is murdered before she can reveal who is to inherit her estate upon her death during the train's journey. To uncover the truth, police detectives handling the case question three suspects accused by the staff and passengers who were aboard the Express at the time of the murder: Arthur Ackerman, Unterwald's estate lawyer and rather hoping to tackle tougher challenges; Herman Merman, a novelist-turned-detective struggling to compete his rival, Dirk Chiselton; and Diana Osterhagen, a rookie Inland Revenue agent investigating Unterwald's finances and trying to prove herself as a field agent. All three each give their own account of the events surrounding the murder.

Arthur's story reveals that he had been handling a new amendment to Unterwald's will aboard the Express, but carelessly lost it moments before his employer was murdered. Whilst seeking to recover it, he had met with others connected to Unterwald: Kasper Bergmann, Unterwald's treasurer, who was embezzling her fortune; Arista Gudrun, Unterwald's scheming sister; Gunter and Hagen Gudrun, Arista's twin sons who were ruining the company; and Doctor Hirsch, Unterwald's physician who belonged to a secret society known as the Order of Idle Hands that protected her business interests discreetly. Arthur eventually tracked down the new will and read it to the others, only to learn he was the sole beneficiary, leading Arista to accuse him of the murder.

Herman's story reveals that he was invited onto the train by Unterwald to investigate wealthy oil baron Jian Liu's recent affection towards her. Herman discovered that Jian sought to buy out Unterwald's company through whatever means he could use. After Jian was accidentally knocked out, Unterwald was shocked to find he planned to inform on her with the Inland Revenue; Herman was made to hide his body from sight, then give his suit to Arthur so he could unwittingly disrupt Diana's investigations. After the murder occurred, Herman panicked when he tried to investigate it and hid himself away. When he attempted to use a disguise to get back to his quarters, he was forced onto the roof of the Express, where he witnessed Arthur's capture moments before he himself was captured on Jian's orders.

Diana's story reveals that she boarded the train whilst it was on the move, where she proceeded to undertake her mission with little success. After Arthur and Herman were captured following the murder, Diana witnessed Jian destroy the new will to continue his plans, whilst benefitting Arista who sought to sell off the company. Hirsch, however, disapproved of this and left with a record; he later learnt there was a copy of the new will at Unterwald's mansion. Caught spying on him, Jian had Diana imprisoned with the other two. Managing to free herself and Arthur, the pair knocked Jian off the train, whereupon they derailed the Express when trying to stop it. When the police arrived, Arista accused Arthur, Herman and Diana of being Unterwald's murderers.

Following their interrogation, all three escape police custody and head to Unterwald's estate to find evidence to clear their names. The trio arrive in time to witness Arista knock out Hirsch and have him imprisoned, after he learned Unterwald was killed with a poisoned dart. Uncovering evidence proving Arista was the killer, the group use Diana's truth serum discreetly on her during a new will-reading, in which Hirsch's arrival causes her to blurt out her involvement in Unterwald's death. Aided by Dirk's arrival, Herman ensures Arista and her sons are arrested, before agreeing to join his rival in a new partnership. Meanwhile, Arthur has Hirsch and the Order look after the company, after agreeing to join Diana and her superior at the Inland Revenue with a new job.

== Development ==
Loco Motive was developed by London-based studio Robust Games, a small independent studio founded by brothers Adam and Joseph Riches. The game initially started as a smaller project for a game jam in November 2020, but after receiving positive feedback, the team expanded it into a full release. The brothers handled both the development and the pixel art design, while the publisher Chucklefish signed Loco Motive in May 2021. The game was translated into German by Marcel Weyers.

== Reception ==
Reception

Aggregate scores
Aggregator	Score
Metacritic	77/100
OpenCritic	78% recommend

Review scores
Publication	Score
Adventure Gamers	4.5/5
Eurogamer	3/5
The Games Machine (Italy)	7.5/10

Loco Motive received "generally favorable" reviews from critics, according to review aggregator Metacritic. Fellow review aggregator OpenCritic assessed that the game received strong approval, being recommended by 78% of critics. The game won the "Adventure Game of the Year" award 2024 by Adventure Game Hotspot. Furthermore, it was nominated in six categories at the AGOTY Awards. It won in the categories "Best Adventure Game", "Best Adventure according to the International Jury", and "Best Puzzles".
