= Timespinner =

2018 video game

- Cover art for the physical release of Timespinner by Limited Run Games
- Developer(s): Lunar Ray Games
- Publisher(s): Chucklefish
- Composer(s): Jeff Ball
- Platform(s): Microsoft Windows, macOS, Linux, PlayStation 4, PlayStation Vita, Nintendo Switch, Xbox One
- Release: September 25, 2018: Windows, macOS, Linux, PS4, PS Vita; September 25, 2018; Nintendo Switch, Xbox One; June 4, 2019
- Genre(s): Metroidvania
- Mode(s): Single-player, multiplayer

Timespinner is a video game developed by Lunar Ray Games and published by Chucklefish. It was funded through the crowdfunding platform Kickstarter in June 2014. Initially scheduled for release in November 2015, growth in the project's scope necessitated a later release date of September 2018.

A sequel, Timespinner 2: Unwoven Dream, was announced on September 25, 2023. The release date has not been announced.

== Gameplay ==
Timespinner is an action-platformer wherein players control Lunais, a Time Messenger. The game mechanics were heavily inspired by Konami's Castlevania: Symphony of the Night. Luna is able to explore the castle and the surrounding grounds, while finding upgrades that help her do that effectively. That includes a double jump for out of reach platforms, and water mask for being able to breathe underwater. The players can use a familiar, which will follow Lunais around and help during the battles. Another core feature of the game is the ability to pause time for a few seconds, allowing the player to avoid enemy attacks and use enemies as additional platforms to get to otherwise unreachable locations. The time-pausing ability is powered by sand, which can be gained by defeating enemies.

== Reception ==
The PC version of Timespinner holds an aggregated rating of 73 on Metacritic, indicating "mixed or average reviews", while the PS4 and Switch versions have a score of 81 and 84 respectively, indicating "generally favorable reviews".

Shaun Prescott, writing for PC Gamer, praised the pixel art graphics and atmosphere of the game, but criticized it for its repetitive environments and for being a "conservative" game that "doesn't offer much that feels new." Kevin McClusky's review for Destructoid was more favorable, praising the game's art, music, and story and concluding that while "there's been no shortage of quality indie games inspired by Super Metroid and Castlevania, ... Timespinner stands out as one of the best." Annette Magaña's review of the PS4 version for Push Square was likewise positive, praising the game's "satisfying, responsive controls," "lavish" levels and diverse combat, as well as its plot that "weaves crucial political themes into its tale of warring nations." PC World named Timespinner among "12 of the best indie PC games you might have missed in 2018."
