= Starbound =

2016 video game

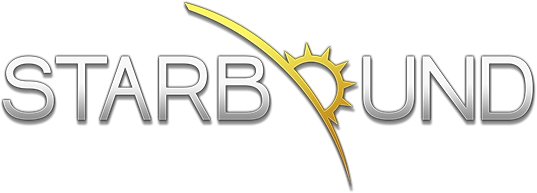
- Developer: Chucklefish
- Publisher: Chucklefish
- Director: Finn Brice
- Producers: Rosie Ball; Harriet Jones
- Designer: Stephen Alexander
- Writers: Ashton Raze; Damon Reece
- Composer: Curtis Schweitzer
- Platforms: Linux; OS X; Windows; Xbox One; Xbox Series X/S
- Release: Linux, OS X, Windows; 22 July 2016; Xbox One, Xbox Series X/S; 24 October 2024
- Genres: Action-adventure, sandbox
- Modes: Single-player, multiplayer

Starbound is a 2016 action-adventure game by Chucklefish. It takes place in a two-dimensional, procedurally generated universe which the player is able to explore in order to obtain new weapons, armor, and items, and to visit towns and villages inhabited by various intelligent lifeforms. Starbound was released out of early access in July 2016 for Windows, OS X, and Linux, and for Windows via Xbox Game Pass in December 2020. It was later released for Xbox One and Xbox Series X/S in October 2024.

== Synopsis ==
Starbound begins with the player inside a spacecraft after the destruction of Earth, home of an intergalactic peacekeeping organization known as the Terrene Protectorate, while just having graduated from its ranks. With nothing to guide it, the shuttle shoots into space without direction, becoming lost in a sea of stars. The space shuttle orbits a habitable planet and an adventure begins that takes the player hurtling across the universe. Starbound contains both quests and story driven missions, buried inside its vast sandbox universe. The space shuttle acts as the player's vehicle while exploring the galaxy, containing a teleport pad the player can use to teleport down to the planets the shuttle is visiting, a ship locker for storing items, a fuel panel for refueling the ship and a cockpit for piloting the ship. The interior of the ship is also fully customizable, with items and blocks able to be freely placed within the ship.

== Gameplay ==
Exploration and settlement gameplay in Starbound. Players can navigate, explore and mine procedurally-generated terrain (left) to gather resources and create settlements, including constructing houses and leasing rooms to NPC tenants and villagers (right).

Many gameplay elements and features, such as items, enemies, and planets, use procedural generation in order to provide a variety of content. The game features story-based missions, quests, free world exploration, enemies to fight, and the ability to interact with and terraform the environment. Player class is defined by items that the player is wearing.

The player also has the ability to farm and sell crops, build buildings, and charge rent to tenant NPCs who can live in those buildings.

In update 1.0, a story was added to the game. The story uses a formula that consists of sandbox exploration to scan a set of items, such as human items, then going through a story dungeon to fight a boss.

In update 1.3 [UNSTABLE], mechs were added to the game. Mechs are modular and allow the player to equip various weapons and tools such as guns, shields, and drills. You can also equip various bodies to the mechs, which set how much energy and health your mechs have. One of the main uses for mechs is the exploration of outer space areas, such as asteroid fields and space ships.

In update 1.4, which is the final content update for the game as of 2019, the features from the then-unstable 1.3 were added to the game proper with the addition of a bounty hunter questline that provide closure to the story as a whole.

== Development ==
Starbound was announced by Chucklefish director Finn Brice in February 2012, with a tiered, Kickstarter-style, pre-order opening via the Humble Store on 13 April 2013. Tier options included a copy of the game, an invite to the beta, and a download of the game's soundtrack, as well as game-related "rewards", such as naming an in-game non-player character, designing a hat or weapon, and having a statue of oneself designed to be placed in the game. Within 24 hours of the pre-order opening, over 10,000 people backed the game, contributing over $230,000 to fund the game's development.

By May 2013, the Starbound pre-order had reached all three of its stretch goals by raising over $1,000,000. The game entered an early access beta on Steam on 4 December 2013, receiving over $2,000,000 in pre-orders prior to its launch. Starbound is written in C++ and uses a custom game engine. The soundtrack was composed by American composer Curtis Schweitzer. The game was officially released out of early access on 22 July 2016. In 2013, it was announced that the game would be ported to the Xbox One at a later time.

In August 28 2024, Chucklefish announced an early playtest for the console version was now available on the Xbox Insider App until September 4, and also claimed that Xbox console edition was 'finally almost ready to launch'. This Xbox version officially launched on 24 October 2024.

=== Volunteer exploitation controversy ===
In 2019, Chucklefish were accused of exploiting around a dozen voluntary contributors during Starbound's development, sometimes logging hundreds of hours with no compensation and completing the same tasks as paid members of the team. Many of them were teenagers at the time and stated that they felt their inexperience was exploited by the company's director, Finn Brice. The allegations were supported by former members of the team, including game developer Toby Fox. In a statement, Chucklefish responded that the contributors were "under no obligation to create content, work to deadlines or put in any particular number of hours. Everyone was credited or remunerated as per their agreement." The contributors partially refuted that statement, saying that they were subject to deadlines. They further added that their disagreement is over the ethics of their treatment, not the legality of it.

== Reception ==
Reception

Aggregate score
Aggregator	Score
Metacritic	81/100

Review scores
Publication	Score
Game Informer	8.5/10
IGN	9.1/10
PC Gamer (US)	84/100

Edit on Wikidata

Starbound received favourable reviews upon its release, according to video game review aggregator Metacritic. IGN praised Starbound's crafting, exploration, and combat mechanics, comparing it to Terraria. Christopher Livingston of PC Gamer stated that Starbound was a charming space sandbox that would keep players entertained for hours. Nathan Grayson of Kotaku praised its exploration elements, calling the universe "strange and unpredictable" enough that players would never quite grow tired of it.

By December 2016, Starbound had sold over 2.5 million copies.

=== Awards ===
Starbound was named Indie Game Magazine's most anticipated game of 2013.
