= Avalon Hill's Squad Leader =

2000 turn-based strategy video game

- Developer: Random Games
- Publisher: Hasbro Interactive
- Platform: Windows
- Release: NA: October 24, 2000; EU: December 15, 2000; DE: May 21, 2001; AU: May 3, 2002
- Genre: Strategy

Avalon Hill's Squad Leader is a 2000 turn-based strategy video game developed by Random Games and published by Hasbro Interactive under the MicroProse label. It is a tie-in to Avalon Hill's board wargame Squad Leader.

== Development ==
Publisher Avalon Hill had considered a computer version of its board wargame Squad Leader during the 1990s, as the game and its Advanced Squad Leader releases had sold over 1 million copies by 1997. However, Computer Gaming World's Terry Coleman noted that the series' complexity made this job "too daunting" initially. In the middle of the decade, the publisher worked with Atomic Games on a computer adaptation called Beyond Squad Leader, but the companies' partnership collapsed and the game became the unrelated Close Combat in 1996. Avalon Hill tried again with Big Time Software's Computer Squad Leader, announced in early 1997. This project fell through in July 1998 to become the independent wargame Combat Mission, in the run-up to Hasbro's purchase of Avalon Hill. At the time of Computer Squad Leader's cancellation, Avalon Hill announced plans to contract another developer to adapt Squad Leader; the publisher's Jack Dott explained that the next incarnation would "be more faithful to the original product". Avalon Hill's entire staff was laid off upon the company's sale to Hasbro that August.

In late 1999, Computer Gaming World published a rumor that Hasbro was interested in adapting the Avalon Hill board game line into computer titles, starting with Panzer Blitz and Advanced Squad Leader. Producer Bill Levay later said that he hired Random Games for the project after detecting the "spirit of Squad Leader in their game Chaos Gate", a computer adaptation of the Warhammer 40,000 board game series. Levay described Squad Leader as an effort to capture the original's "spirit", and to make an "accessible" tactical game, rather than a hardcore simulation or literal adaptation of the board version. The head of marketing for Squad Leader's computer version, Tom Nichols, explained that the game was "heavily based" on Chaos Gate. Squad Leader also reused that project's game engine, which had likewise appeared in Random's Soldiers at War. The game was announced in April 2000.

== Reception ==
Reception

Aggregate score
Aggregator	Score
Metacritic	46/100

Review scores
Publication	Score
Computer Games Strategy Plus	2/5
Computer Gaming World	1/5
Game Informer	6.25/10
GameSpot	3.8/10
GameSpy	68%
GameZone	7.5/10
IGN	5/10
PC Gamer (US)	12%
PC Zone	18%

Squad Leader received "generally unfavorable reviews" according to the review aggregation website Metacritic.

William R. Trotter of PC Gamer said, "Hasbro has confirmed everyone's worst fears. Incredibly, they've published a game that will not only antagonize every living fan of Squad Leader, but will baffle and stupefy most newcomers as well."

In 2004, GameSpy's Peter Suciu wrote that Squad Leader "remains one of the worst board-to-computer adaptations to date".
