= Pathway (video game) =

- Developer: Robotality
- Publisher: Chucklefish
- Designers: Simon Bachmann; Stephan Naujoks; Daniel Ludwig; Stefan Bachmann
- Programmers: Daniel Ludwig; Stefan Bachmann
- Artists: Simon Bachmann; Midio; Phil Giarrusso; Andreas Illenseer
- Composer: Gavin Harrison
- Platforms: Linux; macOS; Windows; Nintendo Switch
- Release: WW: April 11, 2019 (PCs); WW: May 27, 2021 (NS)
- Genre: Tactical role-playing
- Mode: Single-player

Pathway is tactical role playing video game developed by Robotality and published by Chucklefish in 2019. Players fight Nazis in tactical combat to recover occult artifacts in an Indiana Jones-style scenario.

== Gameplay ==
Players control a band of mercenaries in the mid-1930s who attempt to defeat Nazis before they can recover powerful occult artifacts. Missions are based on modern pulp adventure stories, such as Indiana Jones and The Mummy. In each session, players explore a procedurally generated map in a vehicle with a random amount of fuel. Players can expend fuel finding merchants, recruiting mercenaries, and interacting with various non-player characters, which can result in missions. Choices made in these missions can lead to skill checks or fighting enemies, such as Nazis. Combat is turn-based and tactical. Each character is given two actions per turn, which can be used moving, attacking, or using a special ability. Cover provides limited protection from attacks. Upon defeating enemies, players can customize their characters through skill trees. Character progress and items recovered are saved between sessions, but if the mercenaries are defeated in battle, players lose that adventure. A post-release free update added hardcore mode, which introduces permadeath.

== Development ==
Robotality is a German studio. Pathway is a followup to their previous tactical RPG, Halfway. Chucklefish released it for Linux, macOS, and Windows on April 11, 2019, and on Nintendo Switch on May 27, 2021. Limited Run Games manufactured a physical edition in 2021.

== Reception ==
Pathway received mixed reviews on Metacritic. PC Gamer described it as having "crisp combat let down by boring enemies, repetitive missions and a disconnected story". GameSpot said it is well-written and captures the tone of 1940s pulp adventures, but they criticized what they felt was a lack of depth in the tactical combat, lack of differentiation in characters, and a colonialist view of non-Europeans. Though they said it starts off well, IGN said its lack of depth inhibits its replayability. Nintendo Life said it is a competent but overly repetitive game, which they felt limited its appeal on the Switch, which has many tactics games. RPGFan called it a "worthwhile excursion" with "unrealized potential" that could potentially be fixed post-release by adding more variety and depth.

On release, the reviews on Steam were mixed. Developer Simon Bachmann attributed this to several factors. The game had to be released earlier than they would have liked because of budget issues, and they picked up more negative reviews than anticipated because of this. Players perceived the game's content as repetitive and grindy, and they were expecting more of an XCOM clone. When Robotality realized this, they changed how they described the game, rebalanced many mechanics, and said they made players' choices "more meaningful and interesting". The resulting updates pushed the game back to a positive user response.
