= Chucklefish =

British video game company

Chucklefish Limited
- Type: Private
- Industry: Video games
- Founded: 2011; 15 years ago
- Founder: Finn Brice
- Headquarters: London, England
- Key people: Finn Brice (director); Donna Orlowski (COO); Rodrigo Monteiro (CTO)
- Number of employees: 18 (2020)
- Website: chucklefish.org

Chucklefish Limited is a British video game developer and publisher based in London. Founded in 2011 by Finn Brice, the company specialises in retro-styled games. Chucklefish is best known for developing Starbound and Wargroove, as well as being the former publishers of Risk of Rain and Stardew Valley.

== Games ==
=== Developed ===
List of games developed by Chucklefish
Year	Title	Platform(s)
2016	Starbound	Linux, macOS, Windows, Xbox One
2019	Wargroove	Windows, Nintendo Switch, PlayStation 4, Xbox One
2023	Wargroove 2	Windows, Nintendo Switch, Xbox One, Xbox Series X/S, Android, iOS
2027	Witchbrook	Windows, Nintendo Switch, Nintendo Switch 2, PlayStation 5, Xbox One, Xbox Series X/S

=== Published ===
List of games published by Chucklefish
Year	Title	Developer	Platform(s)
2011	Wanderlust: Rebirth	Yeti Trunk	Windows
2013	Risk of Rain	Hopoo Games	Linux, macOS, Windows, PlayStation Vita, Nintendo Switch
2014	Halfway	Robotality	Linux, macOS, Windows
2015	Interstellaria	Coldrice Games	Linux, macOS, Windows
2015	Wanderlust Adventures	Yeti Trunk	Windows
2016	Stardew Valley (Note: Chucklefish published Stardew Valley on all platforms and gradually returned the publishing rights back to ConcernedApe, starting with: Linux, macOS, Windows, PlayStation 4, PlayStation Vita, and Xbox One in December 2018, Nintendo Switch in October 2019, iOS in December 2021, and finally Android in March 2022.)	ConcernedApe	Android, iOS, Linux, macOS, Windows, Nintendo Switch, PlayStation 4, PlayStation Vita, Xbox One
2016	Pocket Rumble (Note: Early access)	Cardboard Robot Games	Windows, Nintendo Switch
2018	Treasure Adventure World	Robit Studios	Windows
2018	Timespinner	Lunar Ray Games	Linux, macOS, Windows, PlayStation 4, PlayStation Vita, Nintendo Switch, Xbox One
2019	Pathway	Robotality	Linux, macOS, Windows, Nintendo Switch, Xbox One
2019	Inmost	Hidden Layer Games	iOS, macOS, Windows, Nintendo Switch, Android
2021	Starmancer	Ominux Games	Linux, macOS, Windows
2021	Eastward	Pixpil	macOS, Windows, Nintendo Switch, Xbox One
2023	Wildfrost	Deadpan Games	Windows, Nintendo Switch, Android, iOS, Xbox One, Xbox Series X/S
2024	Loco Motive	Robust Games	Windows, Nintendo Switch
2026	Wildekin	Cute Newt	Windows, Xbox One, Xbox Series X/S
TBA	Kyora	Pugstorm	Windows, Linux

== Volunteer contributions ==
In 2019, Chucklefish were accused of exploiting around a dozen voluntary contributors during the development of Starbound, sometimes logging hundreds of hours with no compensation. Many of them were teenagers at the time and stated that they felt their inexperience was exploited by company director Finn Brice. Chucklefish stated that contributors were under no obligation to create content or put in any particular number of hours.
