= Wages of War =

1996 video game

Wages of War: The Business of Battle
- Developer: Random Games
- Publisher: New World Computing
- Platform: Windows
- Release: November 1996
- Genres: Turn-based tactics, Turn-based strategy
- Modes: Single-player, multiplayer

Wages of War, also known as Wages of War: The Business of Battle, is a video game developed by American studio Random Games and published by New World Computing and 3DO for Windows.

== Gameplay ==
Wages of War is a turn-based combat game at squad-level, in which players send mercenaries on dangerous missions. Mercenaries are hired for a monetary cost and must be equipped each turn with weapons that are rented from catalogs rather than purchased. Combat takes place in a turn-based mode. Instead of alternating turns between entire teams, each character on both sides has a speed rating, causing initiative to pass back and forth between individual combatants. The game features a limited number of scenarios.

== Development ==
Wages of War was developed by Random Games, a company founded in 1985.

== Reception ==
Reception

Review scores
Publication	Score
Computer Games Magazine	2.5/5
Computer Gaming World	3/5
GameSpot	8.2/10
PC Player	2/5
PC Gamer	78%
Power Play	81%
PC Action	65%

Next Generation reviewed the Windows version of the game, rating it two stars out of five, and stated that "Wages of War has its moments, but overall it is an average title that adds little but a Windows 95 interface to the genre of turn-based, squad-level combat." Games Domain called Wages of War a must for serious gamers.
