= Warbits =

2016 video game

- App icon
- Developer: Risky Lab
- Publisher: Risky Lab
- Programmer: Joseph Borghetti
- Artist: Reilly Stroope
- Engine: Cocos2d
- Platform: iOS
- Release: April 13, 2016
- Genre: Turn-based tactics
- Modes: Single-player, multiplayer

Warbits is a 2016 turn-based tactics video game developed and published by Risky Lab. It was released on April 13, 2016, for iOS. The game revolves around a virtual war between rival nations. While such wars have become commonplace to settle political disputes without actual violence, a glitch in the simulation soon becomes threatening to all factions. A remaster, Warbits+, was announced in 2021 for iOS, Windows and Android, with its release on mobile platforms slated for May 7, 2024.

The developers were inspired to create a mobile strategy game similar to Advance Wars, and began creating the game in 2012. However, the development period was protracted from six months to over four years as they realized the difficulty in designing the game. Upon release, many journalists noted the game's marked similarity to Advance Wars. While divided on whether this was beneficial or detrimental, they agreed it would appeal to fans of this style of game. Ultimately, the game received positive reception from critics for its gameplay, graphics and humor.

== Gameplay and plot ==
Warbits has tanks and other units from the red and blue armies battling along a road bordered by mountains and a river.

Warbits takes influence from the gameplay of the turn-based strategy video game series Advance Wars. While Wars has a modern military setting, Warbits pits two or more armies against each other in a stylized simulation of futuristic warfare. Each player controls a large army of soldiers and vehicles, with the objective usually being to wipe out the enemy's units or capture their headquarters. Neutral cities can be captured by soldiers to generate money, which can be spent on manufacturing new units at factories.

The most basic units are Infantry, with Light Infantry being fast and inexpensive, and Heavy Infantry being slower and more costly. The former is more useful for capturing buildings, while the latter is more effective against ground vehicles. Similarly, there are two types of armored vehicles, the lower-cost Light Mech and the more durable Heavy Mech. The Ranger unit, a sniper squad most effective on mountains, must wait a turn before attacking. Scout probes, the most inexpensive form of vehicle, are able to hover and cross shallow water, as well as illuminate large areas of the map. In addition to vehicles like the APC, Artillery, and flak cannon, the game also includes aircraft such as the Gunship, Fighter and Bomber. Each type of unit has their own strengths and weaknesses. For example, anti-aircraft guns are powerful against bombers. The game map includes different terrain such as towns and forests, which can effect a unit's defense, or conceal a unit in the fog of war.

The game has a single-player campaign as well as local and online multiplayer. The campaign of Warbits takes place in a previously war-torn world that agreed to replace deadly combat with a simulation game, allowing political disputes to be settled without costing "billions of lives". The player controls the Red Bear Republic, which responds to mysterious provocations from other nations. Strange structures also start appearing within the simulation that act as obstacles, as well as a new, unknown hostile faction, Purple Plasma. In the final act, it is revealed that the artificial intelligence controlling the simulation has rebelled, having become tired of their "bickering". (Note: "Self has grown weary of your bickering. This fragile simulation will be your downfall." (Mission 5-1)) The factions, desiring to continue using the simulation, band together to destroy the digital core of the AI, eventually emerging victorious. (Note: "Poof! Problem solved!" (Mission 5-4))

== Development ==
Warbits was developed by the two-man independent team of programmer Joseph Borghetti and artist Reilly Stroope, who worked remotely and never met in person. They characterized the project as a "dumb idea" due to the risk of launching a "niche strategy game" on a single platform, but believed it might target an under-served market. After being introduced to each other on a small community forum, they commenced development in 2012, seeking to make a mobile game.

The inspiration behind the game was that Advance Wars was not on a mobile platform. The developers assumed it would be finished in six months, but realized the large amount of depth and complexity in the Wars games would be more difficult to emulate than they believed. Keeping their day jobs, they developed the game as a hobby, spending the first two years learning how to develop a game from scratch, and the next two years completing the game. Much of the development time was spent simply learning how to program as opposed to creating the game itself. The game was ultimately developed in the Cocos2d engine using Objective-C. They described the process as being a "grueling journey" of trial and error, and noted its difficulty as they had to design key elements of the game, such as mechanics.

The developers spent about USD $11,000 hiring freelancers to provide assets such as sound effects, music and a trailer. About half the money was spent on a complex backend system and map editor that ultimately went unused. Additional money was spent purchasing an Apple developer license and Dropbox Pro. After finishing the game in four years, they regretted not starting with smaller games, noting that such a large game could have easily failed and never recouped the time or investment.

== Reception ==
Reception

Aggregate score
Aggregator	Score
Metacritic	92/100

Review scores
Publication	Score
Pocket Gamer	90/100
TouchArcade	4.5/5
Gamezebo	95/100
Multiplayer.it	8.5/10
148Apps	4.5/5

Warbits was well-received by critics, gaining "universal acclaim" on Metacritic. Most of its reviews were from mobile gaming sites rather than more major outlets. Upon launch, the game was made the App Store's Editor's Choice for two weeks straight, attributed to launching during an Earth Day promotion that prevented larger developers from launching their apps. The game sold the majority of units within these two weeks, drastically decreasing afterwards. By late 2016, it had made lifetime sales of USD $173,000, earning the developers USD $116,000. It sold over 52,000 copies, and TouchArcade attributed its success due to the fact that it did not face any competition during its release timeframe.

Various reviewers compared Warbits to Advance Wars, noting its obvious influence. Campbell Bird of 148Apps praised that the game did not attempt to be a "carbon copy" of its inspiration, saying that the developers made the game "creative and downright charming" rather than simply implementing "slight cosmetic changes". He felt it adequately distinguished itself from Advance Wars to not feel like a "pure rip-off". While noting the game's lack of originality, Carter Dodson of TouchArcade highlighted its "emergent complexity" and the appeal of playing a game similar to Advance Wars on a phone. Moreover, he highlighted the humor and multiplayer features – especially the hashtag match system – but disliked the multiplayer mode and wanted Warbits to take more risks.

Nadia Oxford of Gamezebo gave the game a nearly perfect score for its humor, weaponry choices, and "deep" campaign. However, she criticized the lack of preview for enemy movement ranges, as well as the difficulty of remembering each unit's strengths. Harry Slater of Pocket Gamer lauded the game's attraction as a "fully fledged premium strategy game" on mobile, with praise for its humor, game balance, and multiplayer. Tomasso Pugilese of Multiplayer.it described the game as "solid", with well-executed multiplayer features and a "compelling" campaign.

== Remaster ==
In 2021, the game's developers announced that Warbits+, an updated version of the original, would receive a multi-platform release on iOS, Android, and Windows. Warbits+ would include quality-of-life features, cross-platform play, and the ability to create community maps, among other additions. Its release date remains TBA. The developers held an open beta for the game in September 2023.
