= Frozen Synapse 2 =

2018 video game

- Developer: Mode 7 Games
- Publisher: Mode 7 Games
- Series: Frozen Synapse
- Engine: Torque 3D
- Platform: Windows
- Release: 13 September 2018
- Genre: Turn-based tactics
- Mode: Single-player

Frozen Synapse 2 is a turn-based tactics video game developed by Mode 7 Games. It is a sequel to the 2011 video game Frozen Synapse. The player is in charge of a security force in a cyberpunk metropolis. The game was announced in February 2016 for Linux, macOS, and Windows. The developers were initially targeting a late 2016 release, but the game eventually shipped on September 13, 2018, for Windows only.

== Gameplay ==
The main game mode (sometimes called "City game") includes two layers of gameplay, with phases of turn-based skirmishes similar to its predecessor, and a management phase during which the player handles its organization with a wide view on the city.

The skirmish part is similar to the first game, featuring a turn by turn gameplay where the player controls a squad of soldiers through a fight against the AI, by planning the actions of each soldier for a 5-second chunk. These actions include moving and looking in different directions, in order to give the soldiers a chance to kill the enemy units. This second game includes a few more unit types than the first opus, including the Pistol (a weak unit, but cheaper than its counterparts), the SMG (specialized in closed-quarters combat), the Knife (a fast unit with limited range) and the Flamethrower. It also includes persistent objects, such as smoke or gas grenades or turrets.

The management phase takes place with a bird's eye view of the (procedurally-generated) city, from which the player can control his organization. This involves sending squads throughout the city in order to perform different actions, often including fighting against other AI-controlled squad and thus switching to skirmish mode. The player also needs to manage money in order to purchase units, better equipment and buildings; this money can be earned by fulfilling contracts requiring the player to take certain actions, and from dealing with other factions. The main story also requires the player to try to acquire Relics, which will appear in random locations in the city and require the player to send a squad and fight for the Relic; other factions may also acquire the Relic if they arrive first. Outside of this, the player is free to take any action, including fighting the other factions for control over the city or stealing their Relics.

=== Other game modes ===
==== Single player ====
The game includes a tutorial section designed to explain the different mechanics. It is also possible to play in "story mode", bypassing entirely the strategic layer and allowing the player to only play missions relevant to the story, similar to the original game. The game also features a skirmish mode, where the player only does skirmishes against the computer on randomly generated maps.

A new game mode called "one turn match" has also been introduced, featuring user-created maps where the player only gets one 10-seconds turn to complete an objective, against a premade computer plan. The objective can be killing a number of non-moving "civilian" units, defending a VIP unit, or simply exterminating the other squad.

==== Multiplayer modes ====
The game features a number of multiplayer modes:

- Extermination: A randomized match in which the players gain points by eliminating the other team's units. The game ends when one team is entirely defeated or when a round limit is reached. Generation includes the same unit setup for both teams.
- Bomb defusal: New to Frozen Synapse 2, in this game mode one team has a unit carrying a bomb. The bombing team must plant the bomb at one of two locations before time runs out (by default 16 turns). After the bomb is planted, the defusing team attempts to defuse the bomb within 5 turns while the bombing team protects it. Typical scenario generation gives the bombing team more support units, while the defusing team is given more offensive units.
- Charge: Two teams each choose a vertically oriented zone on the map, which the attacker must then advance across in 6 turns and hold for 3 seconds. The player who chose the farthest zone becomes the attacking team, while the other player defends.
- Dispute: Two teams compete to gather packages and deliver them to a dropoff zone in the corner of the map. The winner is the either the last team standing or the team that gathered the most packages when the turn timer ran out.
- Hostage: In this mode, one player has civilians located in the middle of map, standing in green and yellow zones. In the green zone the player can control their civilians, while in yellow, they become controlled by the computer. To win, the civilian-controlling player must bring at least one civilian to a safe zone before the end of the 12th turn, while the hostage-taking player must kill all civilians to win, but cannot attack civilians that are standing in the green and yellow zones.
- Secure: Each player chooses a zone that they believe they can defend. The player that chose the bigger zone becomes the defending team and must protect their zone for 6 turns. The defender can choose where their units start in their zone, while the attacker starts at the far edge of the map. If defender holds their zone for 6 turns or defeats all of the attacking units, the defender wins. If the attacker either holds the defender's zone for 3 seconds or defeats all the defenders, then the attacker wins.
- Upload: Each player has a civilian hacker and attempts to eliminate the opponent's hacker. Every game generates with the same units (a hacker, 2 assault rifles, and 2 shields) for both teams.

==== Sub-options for matches ====
The different game modes feature modifiers that can be toggled, including the dark/light mode (controlling whether enemy units are always visible or not), a time limit for planning, and the way maps are generated (regular, city-like or as in the first game).

== Plot ==
The game again takes place in the futuristic city of Markov Geist, which has undergone massive changes during the seven years separating it from the first game. The collapse of the Enyo:Nomad corporation and the Charon Palm's AI, which was bringing order to the city, lead to it being splintered into a number of factions fighting for power. The player again takes the role of the expert tactician Tactics, assisted by Belacqua (from the first game), which is called upon by Dominic Mettern, chairman of the Municipal Council, to bring order to the city, but also to fight a mysterious entity called Sonata which has recently appeared in the city.

Throughout the game, the player tries to investigate the identity of Sonata and prevent them from making any progress in controlling the city, while also interacting with other factions. These factions include the Markov Geist Municipal Council, the Brightling University, the religious group Blue Sunlight, the banking firm Diamond Brothers, the military organization Safeguard, the AI group Forgiven Geometry and the hacker collective GUEST, as well as a number of minor factions.

== Development ==
In February 2016, Mode 7 games announced a sequel to Frozen Synapse. By June the developers released a series of development update videos, where the developers showed their progress and answered questions. Initially targeted for late 2016 release date, the game was delayed until September 13, 2018.

== Reception ==
Reception

Aggregate score
Aggregator	Score
Metacritic	76/100

Review scores
Publication	Score
Eurogamer	Recommended
GameSpot	8/10
IGN	7.9/10
PC Gamer (US)	85/100

Frozen Synapse 2 received "generally favorable reviews" according to Metacritic, with critics favoring it more than users.

Some critics stated that the A.I. is predictable, but still challenging. Ian Boudreau from IGN claimed that the game shines in multiplayer.

PC Gamer also praised the game for focusing on player strategy over the randomness-based mechanics that many other strategy games use.

Some critics disliked the single-player city mode, stating that as an idea it is interesting, but may be too heavily scripted.
