= Warhammer 40,000: Chaos Gate =

1998 video game

- Developer: Random Games
- Publisher: Strategic Simulations
- Producers: Steven J. Clayton; Scott Evans
- Designer: Steven J. Clayton
- Programmer: Drew Gugliotta
- Artist: Tony Nichols
- Writer: Keith Ferrell
- Composer: Jim Crew
- Series: Warhammer 40,000
- Platform: Microsoft Windows
- Release: November 23, 1998
- Genre: Turn-based strategy
- Modes: Single player, multiplayer

Warhammer 40,000: Chaos Gate is a video game set in the gothic science fiction backdrop of the Games Workshop game system Warhammer 40,000. In it, players take command of a number of squads of Ultramarines to do battle with their ancient enemies the Word Bearers Traitor Marines, Chaos Demons, and their commander the Chaos Lord Zymran. A sequel, Warhammer 40,000: Chaos Gate - Daemonhunters, was released in 2022.

== Gameplay ==
The game is turn-based and takes part on a gridded playing screen. Each turn an Ultramarine can take a certain number of actions up to its Action Points limit. Actions include moving, firing a weapon or throwing a grenade. The Chaos AI then takes its turn in the same way. Ultramarine players command a number of squads, vehicles and characters from the Space Marines Codex.

Chaos Gate features an experience system, where Space Marines gain experience and can improve their statistics as they participate in missions.

Each Space Marine can be assigned to a general-purpose Tactical Squad or to one of three specialist formations: Assault, Devastator and Terminator Squads. Additional weaponry can be picked up from weapon crates found in the campaign maps.

== Development ==
The game uses a modified version of the Soldiers at War engine. It was originally released for Windows 95 and Windows 98 but has since been made compatible for modern versions of Windows as well. Chaos Gate was developed by Random Games and originally published by Strategic Simulations. In its release by Hasbro Games, Chaos Gate was bundled with Final Liberation: Warhammer Epic 40,000, set in Games Workshop's Epic 40,000 game system that pitted the forces of Humanity against marauding Orks. In 2015, GOG Ltd republished the game digitally.

== Reception ==
Reception

Review scores
Publication	Score
Computer Gaming World	4/5
PC Gamer (US)	85%
PC Zone	80%
Computer Games Strategy Plus	4.5/5
Next Generation	3/5

Richie Shoemaker of PC Zone called Chaos Gate a title that "slowly grabs hold of you and keeps you entertained throughout its duration; something you'll look back on with fond memories rather than foul".

Chaos Gate was a finalist for Computer Gaming World's 1998 "Best Strategy" award, which ultimately went to StarCraft. The editors called Chaos Gate "perhaps the best iteration of the WarHammer universe to date, although some weak AI hampered its turn-based squad-level combat".

== Reviews ==
- The Duelist #36

== Sequel ==
A sequel, titled Warhammer 40,000: Chaos Gate - Daemonhunters, was released in 2022. The game was developed by Canadian studio Complex Games and published by Frontier Foundry.
