= Wargroove =

2019 video game

- Developer: Chucklefish
- Publisher: Chucklefish
- Designer: Finn Brice
- Programmers: Rodrigo Braz Monteiro; Caryn Krakauer; Tom Coxon; William Lundstedt; Catherine West
- Artists: Lu Nascimento; Lili Ibrahim; Jay Baylis; Michael Azzi; Adam Riches; Doris Carrascosa
- Writers: Abi Cooke Hunt; Finn Brice; Jay Baylis
- Composer: Phonetic Hero
- Platforms: Windows, Nintendo Switch, Xbox One, PlayStation 4
- Release: Windows, Switch, Xbox One; February 1, 2019; PS4; July 23, 2019
- Genre: Turn-based tactics
- Modes: Single-player, multiplayer

Wargroove is a turn-based tactics video game developed and published by Chucklefish. It was released for the Nintendo Switch, Windows and Xbox One on February 1, 2019, with a PlayStation 4 version released on July 23, 2019.

== Gameplay ==
Wargroove is a Nintendo Wars-style turn-based tactics video game in which players explore maps and battle foes. Players can choose to take control of one of fifteen commanders, each with their own campaign, motivations and personality.

The game supports local and online multiplayer including player versus player and cooperative play. The game features campaign editing tools which allow players to create their own maps. There is also an overworld editor for linking different missions together; this can let the player create branching paths and set missions to unlock under certain conditions.

== Synopsis ==
=== Setting ===
Wargroove takes place on the island continent of Aurania. In the distant past, Aurania was ruled by two great nations: Silmor in the east, and Cacophony in the west. Silmor and Cacophony became embroiled in an apocalyptic war called The Great Dissonance which ended in the destruction of both nations and the sealing away of a terrible weapon crafted by Cacophony's mages: Requiem. Thousands of years later, four new countries have arisen on Aurania. In the western grasslands is the peaceful and prosperous Cherrystone Kingdom. South of Cherrystone is Felheim, a harsh land where the undead and the living tenuously coexist. Felheim is usually an anarchy, but every few decades a new warlord masters the necromantic Fell Gauntlet and uses it to muster an undead army to invade more hospitable areas of Aurania. North of Cherrystone are the Floran Lands, dominated by the murky Gloomwoods where the aggressive, plant-like Floran make their home. Aurania's east is the seat of the Heavensong Empire, a more technologically advanced nation of inventors and artisans. Heavensong's navy is second to none, and has allowed them to establish colonies in lands across the sea.

=== Plot ===
Following the assassination of King Mercival II of Cherrystone by the High Vampire Sigrid of Felheim, Mercival's young daughter Mercia is crowned queen and soon faces an invasion by the undead Felheim Legion. Despite early successes against hotheaded Felheim commander Ragna, the Legion's numbers overwhelm Cherrystone's defenses, and Valder, the Lord of Felheim and wielder of the Fell Gauntlet, drives Queen Mercia and her army into retreat. Mercia's mentor, the royal mage Emeric, advises her to seek aid from Empress Tenri of the Heavensong Empire.

Along the way, a series of misunderstandings lead to clashes with both the Floran Tribes and Heavensong, but eventually Mercia meets Tenri and is granted ships and supplies, allowing her to launch a seaborne counter-invasion of Felheim. Mercia finally confronts Valder in his fortress, but is attacked from behind by Sigrid. The vampire lets slip that she orchestrated the war by tricking Cherrystone and Felheim into thinking that each was attacking the other, and then absconds with Mercia's family sword, the Cherryblade; Sigrid's goal from the outset had been to find the key to unsealing the ancient weapon Requiem so that she could conquer the world, and the Cherryblade had been that key all along. With Valder now on Mercia's side, she chases Sigrid to the Dragon's Cradle volcano and defeats her, but is too late to prevent the unsealing. Mercia and her allies advance into the volcano and battle the spirit of Elodie, the princess of Cacophony and guardian of Requiem, and then Mercia is forced to vanquish a dark doppelganger of herself in order to destroy Requiem before its evil is unleashed. With Requiem neutralized and Mercia's father avenged, peace settles once more on Aurania.

== Development and release ==
Wargroove was developed by Chucklefish for Microsoft Windows, Nintendo Switch, PlayStation 4, and Xbox One. The developers were inspired by handheld games with accessible tactical gameplay, such as Advance Wars (2001). Chucklefish felt that there were no titles available on the current generation of gaming devices that represented this genre of game. High resolution pixel art was created for the game's graphics. The game was revealed in February 2017, and originally meant to be released in early 2018, but suffered delays that pushed it back to February 1, 2019, with the PlayStation 4 version released on July 23, 2019.

== Reception ==
Reception

Aggregate score
Aggregator	Score
Metacritic	(NS) 84/100 (PC) 82/100

Review scores
Publication	Score
Destructoid	9/10
Electronic Gaming Monthly	8.5/10
Game Informer	9.25/10
GameRevolution	4/5
GameSpot	8/10
IGN	8.5/10
Nintendo Life	9/10
Nintendo World Report	9.5/10
USgamer	4/5

Wargroove received "generally favorable reviews" according to video game review aggregator Metacritic. The game's development cost was recouped three days after its launch.

=== Awards ===
Year	Award	Category	Result	Ref.
2018	Game Critics Awards	Best Strategy Game	Nominated	
2019	The Independent Game Developers' Association Awards	Best Strategy Game	Won	
2019	The Independent Game Developers' Association Awards	Best Game by a Small Studio	Nominated	
2019	Titanium Awards	Indie Game of the Year	Nominated	
2019	The Game Awards 2019	Best Strategy Game	Nominated	
2020	23rd Annual D.I.C.E. Awards	Online Game of the Year	Nominated	
2020	NAVGTR Awards	Game, Strategy	Nominated	

== Sequel ==
A sequel, Wargroove 2, released for Windows and Nintendo Switch on October 5, 2023.
