= Fallen Haven =

1997 turn-based strategy game

- Developer: Micomeq
- Publisher: Interactive Magic
- Producer: Paul Potera
- Programmer: Stéphane Rainville
- Writers: David Burton; Brian Tate
- Platform: Microsoft Windows
- Release: Windows; March 1997; GOG.com; June 21, 2018
- Genre: Strategy
- Mode: Single-player

Fallen Haven is a 1997 computer game. It is a science-fiction themed turn-based strategy game. It functions on Windows 95 and 98 computers.

A sequel, Liberation Day, was released in 1998.

== Plot ==
The game depicts a battle between the human race and an alien culture called the Taurans, sparked by a misunderstanding.

The armies of the Humans are relatively simple and rugged, while the armies of the Taurans are more technologically advanced.

== Reception ==
Reception

Review scores
Publication	Score
CNET Gamecenter	4/10
Computer Games Strategy Plus	4/5
Computer Gaming World	1.5/5
Génération 4	2/6
Next Generation	2/5
PC Gamer (US)	79%
PC Games (DE)	67%
PC PowerPlay	71%
PC Zone	59%
The Charlotte Observer	3/5

The game received average reviews. The Charlotte Observer noted its multiple levels of difficulty. However, Next Generation said, "In the end, Fallen Haven is little more than a good idea with poor implementation. With a few gameplay tweaks and the addition of the two-player option Fallen Haven might have been great, but as it stands you're better off sticking with Civilization 2 [sic]."
