= Football, Tactics & Glory =

2018 video game

- Developer: Creoteam
- Publishers: Creoteam; Toplitz
- Designer: Andrey Kostyushko
- Programmer: Anton Shekhovtsov
- Artist: Sergey Savyak
- Platforms: Windows; Nintendo Switch; PlayStation 4; Xbox One
- Release: Windows; WW: June 1, 2018; Nintendo Switch, PlayStation 4, Xbox One; WW: January 22, 2020
- Genre: Sports
- Modes: Single-player, multiplayer

Football, Tactics & Glory is a sports video game developed by Creoteam. It combines traditional sports management games, role-playing video games, and turn-based tactics. Creoteam and Toplitz published it in 2018 for Windows. It was ported to consoles in 2020. In North America, it was released as Soccer, Tactics & Glory.

== Gameplay ==
Players manage an association football team from they play in a sports league. Members of the team, who have generic names, can be customized like in role-playing games through skill trees, and each character has a class. Matches are played from a top-down perspective and are turn-based and tactical, though characters can act independently in some circumstances. Each match has a limited number of turns.

== Development ==
Creoteam, a development studio from Ukraine, originally included percentages that showed the chance of successfully performing a move, but they felt the resulting conservative gameplay caused matches to become boring. To encourage more dynamism, they removed the percentages. Football, Tactics & Glory entered early access in June 2015 under the former title Football Tactics. After being retitled, the Windows version was released on June 1, 2018. The ports to Switch, PlayStation 4, and Xbox One were released on January 22, 2020.

== Reception ==
Football, Tactics & Glory received mixed reviews on Metacritic. Rock Paper Shotgun called it "beautifully engineered" and praised its streamlined gameplay, which they felt did not oversimplify the sport. Despite initially finding the concept goofy, Polygon enjoyed the mashup of genres and called the resulting gameplay "a convincing simulation of soccer strategies". Nintendo Life said it is "ugly to watch and completely lacking in any flair, but effective enough to get results". GamesRadar, who included it in their list of best football games, recommended it to casual sports fans.
