= Treachery in Beatdown City =

- Developers: NuChallenger; HurakanWorks
- Publisher: NuChallenger
- Designer: Shawn Alexander Allen
- Programmer: Manuel Nico Marcano
- Composer: Inverse Phase
- Platforms: Nintendo Switch; Windows
- Release: WW: March 31, 2020
- Genre: Beat 'em up
- Mode: Single-player

Treachery in Beatdown City is a beat 'em up video game by NuChallenger and HurakanWorks. Although designed to be look like a retro video game, the gameplay combines elements of turn-based tactics games and Japanese role-playing games.

== Gameplay ==
When the president is kidnapped by ninja, the corrupt mayor declines to get involved. With the police overwhelmed, the chief turns to three street fighters. Players control these fighters, each of whom has their own fighting style, in a mix of turn-based tactics and classical beat 'em up games. Although players can fight in real-time, the game discourages button mashing. The turn-based combat is similar to that of the V.A.T.S. system in later Fallout video games. Players expend action points to make attacks. Players can make a powerful series of attacks, known as combos, if they enough fight points. Action points and fight points replenish over time, but they can be regained faster by using power-ups. Enemies include corrupt cops, racists, self-absorbed hipsters, and various other caricatures of nuisances and social ills found in New York City. Story-based grudge matches with previously defeated enemies give players access to more powerful attacks.

== Development ==
Shawn Alexander Allen designed Treachery in Beatdown City, and Manuel Nico Marcano programmed it. The music was composed by Inverse Phase. Allen said he was directly inspired by the aesthetics of NES versions of Bad Dudes, Ninja Gaiden, Teenage Mutant Ninja Turtles, and Double Dragon. Hybrid Heaven, Fallout 3, and Fire Pro Wrestling influenced the gameplay mechanics. Gritty films set in New York City influenced the tone, along with the themes of social justice in Bruce Lee's film Fist of Fury. To discourage grinding, which Allen believed to be against the game's philosophy of fighting only when necessary, Allen chose to give new attacks to players at set points in the campaign. The game satirizes many social issues. Allen credited Get Out and Sorry to Bother You with giving him the confidence to continue with his vision, which he acknowledged might not appeal to some gamers.

A successful crowdfunding campaign in May 2014 raised $50K. Development took several years. Allen attributed this to both health and monetary issues. The developers had to maintain separate full-time jobs as a source of income and could only work on Treachery in Beatdown City in their spare time. To make the most of press attention, Allen refrained from public relations until the project was near completion. The resulting attention near their release date then highlighted how far the game had come. It was released on March 31 for Windows and the Switch.

== Reception ==
Treachery in Beatdown City received mixed reviews on Metacritic. Although GameSpot found the game to be a bit repetitive at times, they praised the writing, humor, and combination of tactics games and brawling games. PC Magazine called it "one of the most unique retro-inspired indie games on PC", though they felt traditional brawling game fans might find it too complex and slow. Despite praising its creativity and ambition, Game Informer said the game is repetitive and its combat is not well implemented. RPGSite felt the cutscenes were too long and the humor did not work for them. They also said the game balance needed some fine-tuning. Nintendo World Report called it "a solid Switch game", but they disliked how many in-jokes and pop-culture references it has. Although they praised the combination of genres, they found the combat frustrating at times. The Los Angeles Times called it "one of the most relevant, of-the-moment video games of 2020".
