= Frozen Synapse =

2011 video game

- Storefront logo of Frozen Synapse
- Developer: Mode 7 Games
- Publisher: Mode 7 Games
- Director: Ian Hardingham
- Producer: Paul Taylor
- Designers: Ian Hardingham; Robin Cox
- Programmer: Ian Hardingham
- Artist: Paul Taylor
- Writer: Paul Taylor
- Composer: Paul Taylor
- Engine: Torque
- Platforms: Windows, Mac OS X, Linux, iPadOS, Android, iOS
- Release: 26 May 2011: Windows, Mac OS X; 26 May 2011; Linux; 28 September 2011; iPadOS; 26 May 2013; Android; 8 June 2013; iOS; 8 January 2014
- Genre: Turn-based tactics
- Modes: Single-player, multiplayer

Frozen Synapse is a turn-based tactics video game developed by independent game developer Mode 7 Games, in which players plan their moves at their leisure and turns are resolved simultaneously. Players attempt to win by giving orders to a small squad of armed combatants, most commonly with the goal of eliminating all enemy units.

The game has online multiplayer, a single-player campaign, and a skirmish mode. The game and its soundtrack formed part of the Humble Frozen Synapse Bundle between 28 September and 12 October 2011, which ultimately grossed over $1 million and had over 230,000 downloads.

It is set in a dystopian cyberpunk future, in which the player assumes the role of a tactical commander assisting a resistance faction in a struggle against a corporate government regime which has used its power to manipulate the populace, or is pitted against other commanders (human or AI) in a skirmish or multiplayer setting.

== Gameplay ==
Frozen Synapse is a tactical combat simulation game, played as asynchronous turns by each player. Each player controls a small number of soldiers armed with various weapons.

The objective in most single-player missions is to eliminate the other squad, but there are also hostage protection and escort missions. Multi-player game modes include last-man-standing deathmatch, area protection, and hostage extraction.

Maps are generated pseudo-randomly to create a range of walls and cover, as well as starting positions for the soldiers. On each turn, the players are given an unlimited amount of time to lay out commands for each soldier to specific waypoints that will be performed during the resolution of the round, a period of about 5 seconds of simulation time. The player can set the direction that the soldier is looking, the soldier's stance and speed, and their default action upon seeing an enemy force in their line of sight. The game provides a facility to review all previous turns and simulate the projected results of the current turn, assuming that enemy forces maintain their current strategies, allowing the player to refine their actions.

Once the player is satisfied with their actions, they commit to this turn. Once all players have committed, the game resolves the actions, reporting these back to the players. Combat is resolved in a deterministic manner based on units' weapon strength, stance, and poise. As long as soldiers remain on both sides or other winning objectives are not yet completed, the players can then replay the results of that turn and plan for the next.

The game includes a "light" mode where players can see all movement on the board, and a "dark" mode where enemies that fall outside any line of sight from allied forces are hidden from the player, though they are given information about any foe's last known position and time since they were last seen.

The game includes a single-player campaign, where the player competes against the computer. The player can also play against other human players through a common server system, which also records games so that players can review them after completion of the game. The game's downloadable content includes new gameplay modes to allow players to compete cooperatively with each other.

== Plot ==
Frozen Synapse is set in the futuristic metropolis of Markov Geist, which has become heavily intertwined with a virtual reality called the Shape, populated by virtual beings called shapeforms, as well as humans using virtual reality technology. The city is under the control of the corporation Enyo:Nomad, which rose to power and usurped the city government under the direction of CEO Nimitz Shand, with the aid of a powerful shapeform named Charon's Palm. The player character is Tactics, a master tactician employed by the underground group Petrov's Shard, founded by Shand's former friend Graham Nix, with the goal of opposing the grasp of the company on the city; the organisation also employs the shapeform Belacqua, in charge of hacking, and Kate Soulsby, a former military which became a double agent within Enyo:Nomad.

Throughout the game, the player controls soldiers within the Shape on the account of Petrov's Shard during skirmishes against Enyo:Nomad. The different missions are meant to improve Petrov's Shard position by performing sabotage acts, allying other factions, seizing facilities controlled by the company and ultimately confronting Shand and Charon's Palm at the Glass Tower located at the heart of the city.

== Development and release ==
Frozen Synapse has one versus one multiplayer. Free-for-all, four-player, and two versus two were planned but were never implemented. According to the developer blog, the two-player co-op for the entire campaign was beta tested.

The game was released for Windows and Mac OS X on 26 May 2011, for Linux on 28 September 2011, for iPadOS on 16 May 2013, and for Android on 18 June 2013. A version for iOS distinct from the iPadOS version was released on 8 January 2014.

In response to controversy about the ending in the video game Mass Effect 3, an update was released for Frozen Synapse which added an alternative ending. The ending contains the jibe "This is the ending to a computer game. We don't care if you like it". Of the experiment, Mode 7 Games developer Paul Taylor stated: "Honestly, it felt like vandalising my own work, which was interesting".

=== Frozen Synapse Red ===
An expansion pack released on 29 May 2012, Frozen Synapse Red adds a number of new features to the game including cooperative gameplay, a new unit called the 'Riot Shield', a new game mode called 'Upload', a new single campaign called 'Red' containing 15 new missions, 10 single player challenge missions, three gameplay mutators and a mode which alters the theme of the game from its typical blue to red.

The expansion includes a new soundtrack for the game and a chiptune album by artist _ensnare_ (Paul Taylor's musician pseudonym) called Impeccable Micro, both available in MP3 and FLAC formats.

=== Frozen Synapse Prime ===
A remake for consoles, called Frozen Synapse Prime and developed by Double Eleven, was released on PlayStation Vita on 24 September 2014. Versions were later made available for PlayStation 3, PC (via Steam), and Android. It includes a modified user interface, as well as 3D graphics; the core gameplay remains the same with a few tweaks, and the singleplayer campaign is identical. Some modifications were also made to the multiplayer system. As of 2024, the game is no longer available on Steam and its multiplayer servers are shut down.

== Reception ==
Reception

Aggregate score
Aggregator	Score
Metacritic	85/100

Review scores
Publication	Score
Edge	9/10
Eurogamer	9/10

The game has received generally favourable reviews, holding a score of 85/100 on Metacritic, with particular praise for its "newly composed, evocative" soundtrack. It won the 'Audience Award' at the 2012 Independent Games Festival and was held to be the 2011 Strategy Game of the Year by PC Gamer US. It has also received praise for its soundtrack, which gaming commentator John "TotalBiscuit" Bain has dubbed "The best soundtrack since Deus Ex".

== Sequel ==
Mode 7 released a similar project titled Frozen Cortex (formerly Frozen Endzone) on 19 Feb 2015. The game incorporated similar strategy and planning gameplay elements but applied to an American football-like sport. A sequel, Frozen Synapse 2, for Windows, Mac and Linux was originally planned to be released in 2016 but was pushed back to 2018.
