= Liberation Day (video game) =

1998 video game

- Developer(s): Micomeq
- Publisher(s): Interactive Magic
- Platform(s): Microsoft Windows
- Release: Windows: NA: March 1998; GOG.com: WW: June 21, 2018
- Genre(s): Strategy
- Mode(s): Single-player, multiplayer

Liberation Day (aka Fallen Haven: Liberation Day) is an isometric turn-based strategy game published by Interactive Magic in 1998 for PC. It is the sequel to the 1997 game Fallen Haven.

== Plot ==
The battle for planet Nu Haven lasted just three months Earth Standard Time, and the cost in lives on both sides was staggering. Mankind had just been rudely awakened from a dream that it was alone in the universe.

Now the greatest military force ever assembled is about to be put at your command, your objective: to liberate planet Nu Haven and prevent the impending invasion of Earth. The most advanced weapons of the 24th century are at your disposal: dorships, heavy tanks, aerial bombers, dreadnoughts, and submarines - 45 different units in action on the battlefields.
