= Corruption 2029 =

- Developer: The Bearded Ladies
- Publisher: The Bearded Ladies
- Engine: Unreal Engine 4
- Platform: Windows
- Release: WW: February 17, 2020
- Genre: Turn-based tactics
- Mode: Single-player

Corruption 2029 is a turn-based tactics video game developed and published by The Bearded Ladies. It was released in February 2020 for Windows PCs. Players control a trio of cyborgs who must defeat enemy troops that outnumber them using stealth and trickery.

== Gameplay ==
Two factions vie for control of the United States using remote-controlled cyborgs in a dystopian future. Players control a squad of three cyborgs who must defeat enemy troops. Surveilling enemy territory is done in real-time, similar to stealth games. When engaging enemies, the game shifts to turn-based combat. Once the squad is detected, enemies alert their allies, though they can be stunned to delay this. To reduce the numbers of enemies that must be fought after being discovered, players can snipe at lone targets and lure enemies into traps. After completing missions, the player's soldiers can be upgraded via a branching skill tree.

== Development ==
Corruption 2029 was released for Windows PCs on February 17, 2020.

== Reception ==
Corruption 2029 received "mixed or average" reviews, according to the review aggregation website Metacritic. PC Gamer and RPGamer compared it negatively to Mutant Year Zero, both criticizing the lack of personality, uninteresting plot, and repetitive set pieces. PC Gamer recommended it to fans of Mutant Year Zero who want more of the same but recommended Mutant Year Zero to everyone else. Describing the gameplay as "a puzzle game with a small shootout at the end", Rock Paper Shotgun's reviewer enjoyed the tactical battles but found the rest of the game to be "repetitive and a bit draining". Although GameSpot liked the tactical battles, their reviewer called it "a strange, underwhelming followup" to Mutant Year Zero. They criticized the setting and characters as uninteresting but found the battles to be "exceptional and tactically robust".
