= Mode 7 Games =

British video game developer and publisher

- Industry: Video games
- Founded: 2005
- Founders: Paul Kilduff-Taylor, Ian Hardingham
- Headquarters: East Sussex, England
- Website: www.mode7.games

Mode 7 Games is a United Kingdom-based video game developer and publisher.

== History ==
Mode 7 was founded around 2005 by Paul Kilduff-Taylor and Ian Hardingham. They spent two years to develop Determinance, a multiplayer sword fighting game. According to Kilduff-Taylor, the game was a commercial disappointment for them, but their capabilities attracted contract work from clients like ITV, BBC, and Novint Technologies. Their work with Novint had involved a game that was divisive - some thought it was great while others were confused by it. This led the pair to the goal of making a game that was good regardless of how long it would take. They started development of this title while still doing contract work to pay for their bills, and once they felt the single player was in a state good enough for a beta release of their next title, Frozen Synapse in April 2010. After about a year, sales of the beta were sufficient to sustain them allowing them to commit to the title full-time. Frozen Synapse, a turn-based combat strategy simulation game, was released in full by May 2011, received critical praise, and by early 2012, had sold over 300,000 units, with over US$300,000 in direct sales to Mode 7. This allowed Mode 7 to expand the game to other platforms and hire additional staff.

Based on the success of Frozen Synapse, Mode 7 wanted to take the core of that game into their next title, and developed Frozen Endzone, a similar strategy game but based on a sport like American football. The game, which was released in 2015, did not fare as well as Synapse even after a change in name to Frozen Cortex, which Kilduff-Taylor attributed to players thinking it was a sports game rather than a strategy game. Due to this, Mode 7 returned to develop a sequel to Frozen Synapse, Frozen Synapse 2, which was initially planned for released in 2016 but was delayed until 2018.

In 2017, Mode 7 announced they would also support publishing of other indie games, with Smac Games' Tokyo 42 and Codebyfire's The Colonists.

In March 2019 Ian Hardingham announced he was leaving the studio to become chief technology officer at Oxford Brain Diagnostics, working on early detection of brain diseases. With his departure, Mode 7 further downsized as they were no longer developing "large-scale indie games in-house", but instead would remain committed to supporting the publishing arm and their third-party studios.

Mode 7 announced in February 2020 they would help publish Ground Shatter Game's Fights in Tight Spaces.
