= Halfway (video game) =

2014 video game

- Developer: Robotality
- Publisher: Chucklefish
- Designers: Simon Bachmann; Stefan Bachmann; Stephan Naujoks
- Programmers: Stefan Bachmann; Daniel Ludwig
- Artists: Simon Bachmann; Johan Vinet
- Composer: Gavin Harrison
- Engine: libGDX
- Platforms: Linux; macOS; Windows
- Release: WW: July 22, 2014
- Genre: Tactical role-playing
- Mode: Single-player

Halfway is a tactical role playing video game video game developed by Robotality and published by Chucklefish in 2014. Players attempt to take control of an adrift spaceship that has been overtaken.

== Gameplay ==
An adrift spaceship begins randomly traveling through hyperspace, during which it is invaded. Players control a survivor who wakes from crysosleep and attempts to figure out what is happening and how to stop it. Players encounter other survivors, each of whom has a special ability, and can recruit up to eight of them. Characters have three stats: health, accuracy, and speed. Between missions, players can talk to the other survivors and choose which survivors to take with them on the next mission. Combat is turn-based and tactical. Each character gets two action points, which they can spend moving, attacking, reloading, or swapping inventory items. All the ammunition is shared among the squad and takes up limited inventory space. Squad members who are defeated during combat revive afterward.

== Development ==
This is German game studio Robotality's first major game. Chucklefish released Halfway for PCs on July 22, 2014.

== Reception ==
Halfway received mixed reviews on Metacritic. Rock Paper Shotgun said it "has some considerable charm", and they enjoyed the mood and attention to detail. However, they criticized what they felt was the game's tendency to make tactical decisions impossible through not providing enough information, unfair battles, and bugs. GameSpot praised the game's visuals, music, and mood, but they felt that the lack of permadeath harmed the atmosphere that these elements set up. They also felt the pacing made some parts of the game feel like a slog. PC Gamer called it a "relatively tough but mechanically lean sci-fi strategy game".
