= Soldiers at War =

1998 video game

- Cover
- Developer: Random Games
- Publisher: Strategic Simulations, Inc.
- Designer: John E. Slaydon
- Platform: Windows
- Release: EU: May 8, 1998; NA: May 25, 1998
- Genre: Turn-based tactics
- Modes: Single-player, multiplayer

Soldiers at War is a turn-based tactics game set in World War II. The player takes control of eight-man squads through the campaign of fifteen historically based missions, starting in North Africa and ending in Germany. Soldiers gain experience with time and can take items with them onto the next mission. The game also features a selection of single play stand-alone missions and a scenario editor. The multiplayer mode allows up to four people to participate in competitive games via LAN or online.

== Gameplay ==
The player must select their squad from a group of 32 men, each with different skill levels, and then equip them for according to their role in the squad and objectives of the mission. The game is played from an isometric perspective, and layers of terrain can be removed in order to see inside buildings or behind other objects. The campaign is played from the perspective of American forces during World War II.

== Reception ==
Reception

Review score
Publication	Score
GameSpot	8/10

GameSpot called Soldiers at War satisfying as the tactical mode of X-COM.
