= List of artillery video games =

This is a comprehensive index of commercial artillery games, sorted alphabetically by year. Information regarding release platform, release type, game setting, developers, and publishers is provided where available. The table can be sorted by clicking on the small boxes next to the column headings.

== Legend ==
Video game platforms
AMI	Amiga	AMI32	Amiga CD32	APPII	Apple II
Arcade	Arcade video game	ATR26	Atari 2600, Atari 2800	ATRST	Atari ST, Atari Falcon
C64	Commodore 64	CLV	ColecoVision, Coleco Adam	DC	Dreamcast
DOS	PC DOS / MS-DOS, Windows 3.X	DROID	Android	DS	Nintendo DS, DSiWare, iQue DS
GB	Game Boy	GBA	Game Boy Advance, iQue GBA	GBC	Game Boy Color
GCN	GameCube	GEN	Genesis / Mega Drive	iOS	iOS, iPhone, iPod, iPadOS, iPad, visionOS, Apple Vision Pro
JAG	Atari Jaguar	LIN	Linux, SteamOS	MAC	Classic Mac OS, 2001 and before
MAIN	Mainframe computer	MOBI	Mobile phone	N64	Nintendo 64, iQue Player
NGE	N-Gage	ODY2	Magnavox Odyssey 2	OSX	macOS
PET	Commodore PET	PPC	Pocket PC	PS1	PlayStation 1
PS2	PlayStation 2	PS3	PlayStation 3	PS4	PlayStation 4
PSP	PlayStation Portable	SAT	Sega Saturn	SNES	Super NES / Super Famicom / Super Comboy
TX4050	Tektronix 4050	TRS80	TRS-80	UNIX	Unix
VIC20	VIC-20	WEB	Browser game	Wii	Wii, WiiWare, Wii Virtual Console
WIN	Windows, all versions Windows 95 and up	XB	Xbox, Xbox Live Arcade	XB360	Xbox 360, Xbox 360 Live Arcade
XBO	Xbox One	ZX	ZX Spectrum		

== List ==
Year	Title	Platform	Setting	Developer	Publisher	Ref.
1970?	Artillery (a.k.a. Super Artillery)	TX4050				
1972 (Note: Original written in FOCAL Mod V (date unknown). TSS-8 BASIC IV port by M. E. Lyon Jr., 1972. HP Time-Shared BASIC port by Brian West, 1975. Microsoft BASIC port published by Creative Computing, 1979)	War 3 (a.k.a. Artillery 3)	MAIN		Mike Forman		
1976	Secret base	Arcade		SEGA		
1978	Pillbox	TRS80		Gene Perkins		
1979	Artillery	PET		Jeff Jessee		
1979	Human Cannonball	ATR26		Atari, Inc.		
1980 (Note: Goodson version dated 10/1/80. No date or credit on earlier version that asks for bags of gunpowder instead of force)	Artillery Simulator	APPII		B. Goodson		
1980	Super Artillery	APPII		Greg Stein, Rainy City Software		
1981	Stone Sling	ODY2		Philips		
1982	Artillery Practice	APPII		Jack Kenne		
1983	Artillery Duel	ATR26, C64, CLV, VIC20		Xonox		
1983	Tank Trax	ZX		Amoeba Software		
1986	Tank Wars			Cody Snider		
1987	Ballerburg	ATRST		Eckhard Kruse		
1988	Gravity Wars	AMI, DOS, MAC		Ed Bartz		
1991	Tanx	AMI		Gary Roberts		
1991	Gorillas	DOS		Microsoft		
1991	Scorched Earth	DOS		Wendell Hicken		
1993	Tylli	DOS		Janne Uusilehto		
1993	Scorched Tanks	AMI		Michael Welch		
1994	Charr	AMI		Michael Boeh		
1995	Worms	AMI, AMI32, DOS, GB, GEN, JAG, MAC, PS1, SAT, SNES		Team17		
1996	Worms & Reinforcements United	AMI		Team17		
1997	MoleZ	DOS		FRACTiLE		
1997	Worms: The Director's Cut	AMI		Team17		
1997	Worms 2	WIN		Team17		
1997	Warheads	WIN		totalPlay Software		
1998	Liero	DOS		Joosa Riekkinen		
1999	Worms Armageddon	DC, GBC, N64, PS1, WIN		Team17		
2000	Hogs of War	PS1, WIN		Infogrames		
2001	Pocket Tanks	OSX, WIN		Blitwise		
2001	Scorched 3D	LIN, OSX, UNIX, WIN		Gavin Camp		
2001	Ballerburg: Castle Siege	WIN, PS1		Ascaron		
2001	Worms World Party	DC, GBA, NGE, PPC, PS1, WIN		Team17		
2003	Atomic Cannon	OSX, WIN		Isotope 244		
2003	Worms 3D	GCN, OSX, PS2, WIN, XB		Team17		
2003	Space Tanks	WIN		YawThrust Software Labs		
2004	Snails	PPC		PDAmill		
2004	Worms Forts: Under Siege	MOBI, PS2, WIN, XB		Team17		
2005	GunBound	WIN		softnyx		
2005	Worms 4: Mayhem	PS2, WIN, XB		Team17		
2006	Gusanos			Mario Carbajal		
2006	Worms: Open Warfare	DS, PSP		Team17		
2007	Chick Chick Boom	WEB		Extra Toxic		
2007	Crazy Penguin Catapult	WIN, iOS		Sumea		
2007	Worms	XB360		Team17		
2007	Worms: Open Warfare 2	DS, PSP		Team17		
2008	Gravity Wars	WEB, LIN, WIN		Boris Yakubchik		
2008	Worms: A Space Oddity	Wii		Team17		
2009	Death Tank	XB360		Snowblind Studios		
2009	Incoming!	Wii		JV Games		
2009	Worms 2: Armageddon	XB360, PS3		Team17		
2010	Worms Reloaded	WIN, OSX		Team17		
2010	Worms: Battle Islands	Wii, PSP		Team17		
2011	Worms Ultimate Mayhem	WIN, XB360, PS3		Team17		
2012	Worms Revolution	WIN, XB360, PS3		Team17		
2013	Worms 3	iOS, DROID, OSX		Team17		
2013	Worms Clan Wars	WIN, OSX, LIN		Team17		
2014	Worms Battlegrounds	PS4, XBO		Team17		
2015	Worms 4	iOS, DROID		Team17		
2015	ShellShock Live	WIN, OSX, LIN, XBO, PS4		kChamp Games		
2016	Worms W.M.D			Team17		
2026	Iron Nest	WIN	Alternate history	Nick Nieuwoudt, Dominik Latos		
2027	Paladin HC	WIN	Historical	Fahrettin's House Game Studio		

== Games with artillery modes ==
The following list contains games with artillery modes /sections, but whose regular gameplay is not an artillery game

Year	Title	Platform	Setting	Developer	Publisher	Notes	Ref.
1995	Worms Reinforcements	AMI		Team17		Expansion to Worms	
1996	Death Tank	SAT		Ezra Dreisbach		Mini-game in PowerSlave	
1996	Death Tank Zwei	SAT		Ezra Dreisbach		Mini-game in Duke Nukem 3D	

== See also ==
- Artillery game
- List of strategy video games
