= Bjørn Lynne =

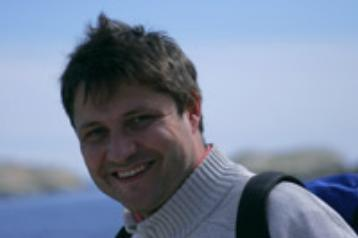
- Lynne in 2006

Background information
- Also known as: Dr Awesome [sic] Divinorum
- Born: Bjørn Arild Lynne; December 31, 1966 (age 59)
- Origin: Stavern, Norway
- Genres: New-age; progressive rock; fantasy rock; symphonic rock; electronic; space rock; electronica; funk; techno; Celtic; dance
- Occupations: Sound engineer; composer; music publisher
- Instruments: Keyboards; guitar; bass guitar; programming
- Years active: 1988–present

Bjørn Arild Lynne (born December 31, 1966) is a Norwegian sound engineer and music composer, now living and working in Stavern, Norway. He was also known as a tracker music composer under the name "Dr. Awesome" in the demoscene in the 1980s and 1990s when he released tunes in MOD format and made music for Amiga games.

In 1995 he moved to England and composed for Team17. He recorded albums in England, including the Timura trilogy, inspired by the books of Allan Cole. In 2005 he returned to Norway and started a music publishing company, Lynne Publishing AS and a royalty-free music / stock music service, Shockwave-Sound.

He composed soundtracks for the games Worms and Seven Kingdoms, and for solo albums of fantasy and trance music. His tunes have also been used in television and film.

His music is featured in the main menu screens to multiple games in the Five Nights at Freddy’s series, most notably the first and second installments.

== Composition ==
In the later 1980s and 1990s, Lynne worked in the demoscene using the name Dr. Awesome. As a member of "Crusaders" demo-group, he created numerous demo soundtracks and standalone tunes in Amiga tracker format. He made music for Amiga games like "Qwak", "Brat" and some others (see discography for more info) and recorded two studio albums: "Hobbits & Spaceships" and "Montage". Later on, some of these tracks would become parts of his "Decade" and "Revive" albums. In 2014, two albums were released with old, original recordings of his music. Lynne has published occasional electronic dance/trance music under the name "Divinorum", including a collaboration with Aural Planet, called "Power Liquids".

Lynne has composed music for film, including Walpurgisnacht and the C. S. Lewis biography Through a Lens Darkly. He has also composed or designed music for over 80 video games.

The track "Soundstreamz - Instrumental", from his 2004 album Statement, is provided as the default on-hold music for 3CX, a popular business telephone system.

== Discography ==
Albums
Year	Title	Publisher	Notes
1992	Hobbits & Spaceships		Joint effort with "Fleshbrain" Seppo Hurme
1994	Montage	DENS Design	
1995	Dreamstate	Centaur Discs	melodic / progressive electronic
1996	Witchwood	Mellow Records	adventure / soft progressive rock
1997	The Void	Cyclops/GFT & LynneMusic	republished by LynneMusic in 2004, vibrant electronic progressive psychedelic melodic space-rock
1998	Wizard of the Winds	Cyclops/GFT	based on the book by Allan Cole, 1st album in the Timura trilogy, adventure / progressive rock
1998	Worms 2	SynSoniq Records	original soundtrack for Worms 2 video game
1999	Wolves of the Gods	Cyclops/GFT	based on the book by Allan Cole, 2nd album in the Timura trilogy, adventure / progressive rock
1999	Worms Armageddon		original soundtrack for Worms Armageddon video game, Team17
1999	Isms	self-published	
2000	Talisman	self-published	
2000	Revive		album of older works in the MOD demoscene, traditional instrumentation
2001	The Gods Awaken	Cyclops/GFT	based on the book by Allan Cole, 3rd album in the Timura trilogy, adventure / progressive rock
2002	Colony	LynneMusic	
2003	Power Liquids	self-published	collaboration with Aural Planet
2004	Statement	self-published	dance music
2004	Soothe	self-published	soothing meditation music
2006	Undercover	self-published	co-composition with Adam Skorupa ("Skorpik"), thriller/spy music
2006	Beneath Another Sky	LynneMusic	
2008	Quiet Places	self-published	
2009	Crystal Horizon	LynneMusic	
2014	Traveller		

Game soundtracks
Year	Title	Platform(s)	Developer	Contribution
1991	Brat	Amiga	Foursfield, Image Works	Music
1991	Cubulus	Amiga	Software 2000	Music
1992	Fantastic Voyage	Amiga	Centaur Software	Music
1992	Escape from Colditz	Amiga	Digital Magic Software	Music
1992	Project X	Amiga	Team17	Includes one music track
1993	Qwak	Amiga	Team17	Music
1995	Alien Breed 3D	Amiga (1200 & CD32)	Team17, Ocean Software	Music & SFX
1993	Super Obliteration	Amiga	David Papworth	Music
1995	Worms	PC	Team17	Music, sound effects and voice editing/processing (not Game Boy version)
1996	World Rally Fever	PC	Split, Team17	Sound effects.
1996	X2	PS1	Team17	All music, sound effects and voice editing/processing
1997	Dark Corona	MAC OS	Algomedia Software	Music
1997	Seven Kingdoms	PC	Enlight Software	All music and sound effects
1998	Addiction Pinball 'and Worms Pinball	PC	Team17	All music and sound effects
1998	Worms 2	PC	Team17, MicroProse	All music and SFX
1998	Nightlong: Union City Conspiracy	PC	Trecision, Team17	Voice editing, Music
1999	Arcade Pool 2	PC	Team17	Music & SFX
1999	Seven Kingdoms II: The Fryhtan Wars	PC	Enlight Software	All music and sound effects
1999	Worms Armageddon	PS1, Dreamcast, PC	Team17, MicroProse	Music and sound effects
2000	Virtual-U	PC	Enlight Software	Features classical music by Handel – arranged for the game. Also original composition for the animated intro
2000	Phoenix - Deep Space Resurrection	PC	Team17, MicroProse	Music only
2000	Spin Jam	PS1	Empire Interactive	All music and sound-fx
2000	Siege of Avalon	PC	Digital Tome	All in-game General MIDI Music (not front-end music)
2000	Ford Racing	PS1, PC	Elite Systems, Empire Interactive	Music
2000	Gate		GateSoft	
2001	Stunt GP	Dreamcast, PS2, PC	Team17	Music and sound-fx
2001	Bomberman Online	Dreamcast	Elkware	4 tracks of music
2001	Worms World Party	Dreamcast, PC	Team17	All music, sound effects and voice recording/processing
2001	Capitalism II	PC	Enlight Software	All music & sound effects
2001	Worms Blast	GBA, GC, PS2, PC	Team17, Ubisoft	All music, sound effects and voice editing (not GBA version). PC music (DirectX 8)
2001	Hotel Giant	PC	Enlight Software, JoWood	All music, sound effect and voice recording/processing
2003	Catch the Sperm 3	PC, Mobile phone	Black Pencil Entertainment AG	
2003	Restaurant Empire	PC	Enlight Software	Developed with DirectMusic interactive music system (DirectX 8)
2003	Worms 3D	GC, PS2, XBOX, PC	Team17, Sega	All music, sound effects and voice arrangement / editing / recording
2004	Blox Forever	Browser	ArcadeTown	Custom sound design.
2004	Worms Forts: Under Siege	PS2, XBOX, PC	Team17, Sega	All music, sound effects and voice arrangement / editing / recording
2004	Ahriman's Prophecy	PC	Amaranth Games	Some music tracks
2005	BumpCopter 2	Browser	ArcadeTown	Sound effects.
2005	Midnight Strike	Browser	ArcadeTown	Sound effects.
2005	Worms 4: Mayhem	PS2, XBOX, PC	Team17	Music
2005	The Lost City of Gold	PC	Anarchy Enterprises	Music
2005	Zombieball	N/A		Game effects, voice recording, some music
2005	Squirrel Escape	Browser	ArcadeTown	Sound effects
2006	Lemmings	PSP	Team17, Sony	Sound effects
2006	Geneforge 4: Rebellion	PC	Spiderweb Software	Intro music
2007	Magic Touch	Browser	Nitrome	Music
2008	Go Go UFO	Browser	Nitrome	Music

=== As Dr. Awesome ===
1. Early Game Soundtracks (2014). Original video game music
2. Original Amiga Works (2014). Original versions of 103 tracks composed on the Amiga
3. Decade (1997). Published by Studio17 under Dr. Awesome. 55 minutes of music plus much demoscene MIDI, MOD and MP3
4. X2 (1996). Official soundtrack CD of the game X2.

=== Miscellaneous ===
1. Tokyo Getaway EP (2009) by Polygon Palace - contains a sample of Now What Medley by Lynne.
2. Open Interactive / Sky Digital TV games (2001) Some music in the main game section.
3. Solnatt
4. The LaSalle Bank Chicago Marathon Course Video (2000) Music in a video about training for Chicago Marathon
5. Virtual Van Cortlandt Park (2000) Music in video about this cross country race.
