= Addiction Pinball =

1998 video game

- Developer: Team17
- Publishers: MicroProse (PC); Infogrames (PS)
- Platforms: Microsoft Windows, PlayStation
- Release: Windows: NA: 19 May 1998; EU: 1998; PlayStation: EU: 12 November 1999; UK: January 2000
- Genre: Pinball
- Modes: Single-player, multiplayer

Addiction Pinball is a pinball video game developed by Team17 and published by MicroProse for Microsoft Windows in 1998. It features tables based on two Team17 games, World Rally Fever and Worms.

It was ported to the PlayStation in 1999 as Worms Pinball to capitalise on the success of the Worms franchise. The PlayStation version was published by Infogrames and was only released in Europe.

A cut-down version for the Microsoft Windows was also released in 1998, also titled Worms Pinball, and was initially included in a Worms compilation pack containing Worms and Reinforcements United and Worms 2. It was also included with the first print run of Worms Blast for Microsoft Windows in 2002, and in 2012 was released on Steam. This version does not include the World Rally Fever table.

== Tables ==
Addiction Pinball features two tables based on previous Team17 games.

=== World Rally Fever ===
World Rally Fever is the default pinball table in Addiction Pinball.

Based on World Rally Fever, the WRF table is based around the theme of racing cars and car maintenance. The primary goal in this table, short of accruing the highest score, is to participate in various races.

=== Worms ===
Worms is the additional table included in Addiction Pinball.

Based on the Worms series, the aim of this table is to complete missions and collect weapons in order to increase your rank and move on to the next of five areas—Arctic, Mars, Jungle, Desert and Hell. This table provides more space for the ball to travel and has more ramps and bonuses than its counterpart.

== Re-releases ==
Addiction Pinball was re-released in 1999 on the Hasbro Interactive budget label as an "Action" title. It was also included in The Armageddon Collection, a 2000 compilation release pairing it with Worms Armageddon and a Worms Armageddon screensaver. The PSone version was also re-released in an Infogrames "Best Of" collection which also included Worms Armageddon and Infogrames' own Hogs of War.

The Microsoft Windows version of Worms Pinball, itself a cut-down version of Addiction Pinball featuring only the Worms table, was included with the first pressing of Worms Blast in the UK. More recently the game was re-released on Steam at the same time as the latest spin-off title, Worms Crazy Golf.

== Reception ==
Reception

Aggregate score
Aggregator	Score
GameRankings	77%

Review scores
Publication	Score
CNET Gamecenter	8/10
Computer Games Strategy Plus	3/5
Computer Gaming World	3.5/5
GameSpot	8/10
Hyper	74%
IGN	8/10
Jeuxvideo.com	(PS) 13/20
Next Generation	4/5
PlayStation Official Magazine – UK	(PS) 6/10
PC Gamer (US)	65%

Addiction Pinball received favourable reviews according to the review aggregation website GameRankings. Next Generation called it "the smoothest-playing and best-looking pinball game we've seen." GamePro said, "One word sums up this game: Wow." (Note: GamePro gave the PC original two 5/5 scores for graphics and control, and two 4.5/5 scores for sound and overall fun factor.)
