= Worms Golf =

2004 video game

- Developer: Rockpool Games
- Publisher: THQ
- Series: Worms
- Platform: J2ME
- Release: 2004
- Genre: Sports

Worms Golf is an action game for Java ME-enabled mobile devices. It was programmed by Rockpool Games and published by THQ in 2004.

== Gameplay ==
Worms Golf is an arcade game based on the sport golf in which the player hits a grenade toward an enemy worm who is tied to a stick.

== Sequel ==
In 2011, Team17 released a sequel, Worms Crazy Golf, for PC, Mac, iOS and PlayStation 3. The sequel was developed in-house, and is based upon the Worms 2: Armageddon/Worms Reloaded iteration of the series.
