= Worms 2 =

1997 video game

- European cover art
- Developer: Team17
- Publishers: EU: Team17; NA: MicroProse
- Designer: Andy Davidson
- Programmer: Karl Morton
- Artists: Danny Cartwright; Rico Holmes
- Composer: Bjørn Lynne
- Series: Worms
- Platform: Microsoft Windows
- Release: DE: 21 November 1997; EU: 24/28 November 1997; NA: 13 January 1998
- Genres: Artillery, strategy
- Modes: Single-player, multiplayer

Worms 2 is a 1997 artillery tactical game developed and published by Team17 and released for Windows. It is part of the Worms series and a sequel to the 1995 game Worms. As with the first game, players control their team of worms in combat against each other, using a wide collection of rockets, grenades, firearms, explosives, and air strikes, some eclectic and others bizarre. Also as with the first game, the objective is to eliminate all opposing worms and become the sole surviving team.

Worms 2 contains many features inherited from Worms: The Director's Cut, including a level editor and more weapons. It also contains many improvements, of which the most obvious is a completely new visual cartoon style, which has remained for the rest of the series. Other improvements include supported online play and simply new additional weapons and customisation options. It was released to generally very positive reviews, with critical acclaim going to the expanded customisation, the ability to be played over the Internet, a level editor, and the humour. The graphical overhaul was also generally lauded, as was the expanded arsenal, although some reviewers felt that the artificial intelligence was too easy. It was followed by a sequel called Worms Armageddon.

== Gameplay ==
Worms 2 contains radically improved graphics, including cartoonish visuals and a compact user interface. In this screenshot, the worm holding a red cluster bomb is about to throw it, but its player must first determine how far the grenade will be thrown. This is indicated by a power bar between the worm and the crosshair filling up.

Worms 2 is a turn-based tactical game. Players take turns controlling teams of worms across two-dimensional landscapes. Worms are randomly placed across the landscape at the start of each level. During a single turn, a player can move only one of their team's worms. Worms can crawl and jump, as well as swing by ninja-rope, parachute, teleport, and bungee when the appropriate items are available. The objective of a traditional match or campaign mission is to defeat all opposing teams by killing their worms and become the last surviving team. When hit with a weapon, a worm will lose health depending on the power of the weapon and the directness of the hit. A worm can be killed either by having its health reduced to zero or being knocked into the water around and below the level. Should a specified amount of time in a round pass and there still be multiple hostile teams alive, sudden death is enabled, during which either or both of these events occur: the landscape sinks under water, or each worm is reduced to one unit of health. If sudden death is disallowed, the round simply draws.

Worms 2 is primarily played in multiplayer mode. In this mode, the player selects a team to control, as well as one to five other teams, all opposing each other; those teams may be controlled by the computer or other players. A total of only no more than 18 worms may be present on any level. Each team placed in the roster begins with an equal number of worms, each with an equal amount of specified health. The player determines how many rounds a team must win in order to win a match. Multiplayer mode is played either on a single computer or on a local network or the Internet involving up to six computers. In the case of the latter, the ability to draw a round or force sudden death early is disabled. In addition to quickly starting a game without setting up options, the player can also opt to complete single-player missions in order. The player first chooses a difficulty level, and completing one mission gives the player a password for the next. The player can use these passwords to continue where they left off.

The game includes a wide variety of weapons, including melee, projectile, and explosive weapons, as well as air strike-based attacks. Some are based on real-life arms, such as the shotgun, bazooka, and hand grenade. Others are more fanciful and cartoonish, such as banana bombs, holy hand grenades, falling concrete statues of donkeys, and the sheep, which serves as a mobile explosive. Depending on the game options, additional weapons such as mortars or cluster grenades may randomly fall onto the terrain in air-dropped crates, which when collected will expand the collecting worm's team's arsenal. Also depending on the options, two other crates may spawn, including first-aid crates that heal worms and booby-trapped crates disguised as weapon crates. On rare occasions "secret" weapons will fall in weapon crates—the only means of obtaining them.

The game offers players the ability to create their own custom teams. Each team has its own name and includes eight individually named worms, and the player can also change or create the team's voice set. The game includes a random level generator and a basic level editor which allows the user to create the shape of the level with a brush. Instead of only islands, levels may also be caverns, characterised by an indestructible ceiling and all air strike-based weapons being disabled. Every part of a landscape, including manually placed girders, is fully destructible and unaffected by gravity.

Worms 2 includes both weapon and option editors, each offering a very high level of control over many game-play and weapon settings. Option settings include worm retreat time, wind strength, and fall damage. Weapon settings include the initial stock each team begins with in a match, the explosion bias, the amount of damage the weapons deal, their interaction with the wind, the time within which the worm can retreat after use, the delayed availability of certain items in a number of turns, the quantity of refills for each individual item, and the relative frequency of their appearing in crates.

== Development and release ==
Worms 2 was confirmed to have been in development since at least April 1996. It was at first meant to be a minimal sequel to the original game with only a new engine and added online play. However, Worms creator Andy Davidson felt that the aforementioned improvements would not be enough to justify a sequel, and he also wanted to bid a farewell to users of the Amiga, which saw waning support and popularity. To do this, Team17 allowed him to spend his time working on Worms: The Director's Cut, an expansion pack to the original designed for late Amiga computers. The two simultaneous Worms projects each had their own separate team. Whilst The Director's Cut would become the last Amiga software by Team17, aside from graphical and memory improvements, it introduced a new level editor and additional weapons such as the Concrete Donkey. Those new features formed the basis for Worms 2, and would appear in later titles of the franchise.

Worms 2's graphics and style were Team17's priority. The company believed that the original Worms' dated graphics deterred the game's potential players. They opted for the technically better SVGA graphics, and because of memory boundaries limited the game's release to only Windows. Danny Cartwright and Rico Holmes were the game's artists. Cartwright was responsible for its animation. To do this, he used Photoshop, but later in development he used Cambridge Animation Systems' ANIMO, a spline-based animation software. It took as many as 14,000 frames to draw the worms, and it was estimated that continuing to use Photoshop for the sprites would have required three to four years. In comparison, it took merely months to master ANIMO, and after that the worms were tested five or six times before they were determined to be complete. Holmes was responsible for the game's themes, including their landscapes and background. These were sketched before they were digitally scanned. Holmes said that each of the game's eleven themes took about one month before being finalised. He has also described the visual style as being a "very clear-cut cartoon style" that was at odds with his preferred general style. The game uses parallax scrolling to display the battlefields and backgrounds.

The soundtrack was composed by Bjørn Lynne, and the instruments used are synthesisers, a guitar, and a bass guitar. The game's lead programmer was Karl Morton, who produced the engine. Cris Blyth was responsible for the full-motion cutscenes – which are cel-shaded unlike the original game's cutscenes – and along with Andy Davidson and Matiné Studios provided the voices for the worms' speech banks. Worms 2 was published by MicroProse on various days across Europe in November 1997, and in North America on 13 January 1998. It was later rereleased on GOG.com on 5 September 2012, with the only difference being that online play is disabled.

== Reception ==
Reception

Review scores
Publication	Score
Computer Gaming World	4/5
GameSpot	8.8/10
PC Zone	82%
Gambler	90%
GMC	8/10
Joystick	80%
PC Games	77%
PC Top Player	93%

Worms 2 launched in Europe with a shipment of 200,000 units to retailers. In the United States, PC Data reported sales of 68,396 copies for Worms 2 during 1998, which accounted for about $1.88 million (equivalent to about $3.71 million in 2025) in revenue.

Worms 2 received generally very positive reviews, being praised for the customisability, integrated online play, the level editor, and the humour. Trent Ward of GameSpot lauded the destructive environment and described the physics as being "minute-to-learn-lifetime-to-master", citing the latter as the reason for the addictive gameplay. Fernando de la Villa of the Spanish magazine PC Top Player lauded the sound effects, voice acting, and soundtrack, whereas Andreas Wallström of the Norwegian magazine Tekno felt that the soundtrack started off as boring before swinging for the better, as if the tracks were ordered by the date they were created. The humour has been characterised as tragicomedy and exemplifying the "superiority theory", where the humour is derived from the fact that inexperienced players often hurt their own worms unintentionally. Martin E. Cirulis of Computer Gaming World felt that the game could become boring if the player does not enjoy both the artillery genre and the game's humour.

Critics universally agreed that Worms 2 is best played in multiplayer mode, rather than single-player, with most of them citing the artificial intelligence as the reason. Harald Wagner of PC Games described it as occasionally being seemingly overwhelmed to the point that it will unintentionally hit its own worms instead, but also remarked its skill in ballistics. Nevertheless, he considered the AI to be the only disappointing element affecting the overall impression of the game. However, the Italian magazine Games for My Computer insisted that the AI was balanced, instead citing the simple campaign lacking various objectives as the drawback. The game's new visuals were also largely well received upon release. Gambler praised the visuals as well as the sound effects, saying that they brought "a lot of life" to the game. Andy Martin of PC Zone also thought that the higher-resolution graphics gave the game "character", whilst saying that the gameplay makes up what the visuals lack, although he complained about the limited field of view and the inability to zoom out. Conversely, Laurent Sarfati of Joystick criticised the visuals as being cute and the worms' animations as being "tasteless" and "for snotty 3- to 6-year-olds". He also found that apart from the new graphics, expanded options, and the ability to play online, players of the first Worms game risk finding the sequel worthwhile. The visual style would reappear in two subsequent sequels: Worms Armageddon and later Worms World Party. The style continues to retrospectively receive critical acclaim due to its association with Worms Armageddon, normally considered the best title in the Worms franchise.

PCmanía considered Worms 2 to be one of the 100 essential programs of 1997, remarking its achieved feat of having high levels of both simplicity and addictiveness. In 1998, PC Gamer US declared it the 30th-best computer game ever released, acclaiming what they called an original and addictive blend of action and strategy genres, as well as the humour. The editors named it the best turn-based strategy game of 1998, writing, "Worms 2 serves as evidence that sometimes a genre's salvation can be found in the unlikeliest of places". It was a finalist in the magazine's Best Multi-Player Game category, which ultimately went to Tom Clancy's Rainbow Six. It was also a runner-up for IGN's Best Online Game of the Year award in 1998, lauding its destructibility and powerful weapons. On its "Game of the Century" column in 2000, PC Powerplay ranked it the 42nd-greatest game for its variety of weapons, and considered it as a candidate for the best multiplayer game.
