= Worms Rumble =

- Developer: Team17
- Publisher: Team17
- Series: Worms
- Engine: Unreal Engine 4
- Platforms: Microsoft Windows; PlayStation 4; PlayStation 5; Nintendo Switch; Xbox One; Xbox Series X/S
- Release: Windows, PS4, PS5; December 1, 2020; Switch, Xbox One, Series X/S; June 23, 2021
- Genre: Action
- Mode: Multiplayer

Worms Rumble is a 2020 action game developed and published by Team17. As a spin-off of the Worms series, the game was released for Microsoft Windows, PlayStation 4 and PlayStation 5 in December 2020 and for the Nintendo Switch, Xbox One and Xbox Series X/S in June 2021.

== Gameplay ==
Unlike its predecessors, Worms Rumble is a 2.5D real-time action game. In Rumble, players assume control of anthropomorphic worms and compete against each other in modes including Death Match, Last Worm Standing and Last Squad Standing. The game features a variety of exotic weapons, such as Sheep Launchers, Plasma Blasters, and Sentry Turrets, which can be used to defeat enemies. Players can acquire jet packs and grappling hooks to navigate the environment easily. As players progress, they can gain experience points which can be used to unlock cosmetic items and customise the appearance of their playable avatars.

== Development ==
Team17 announced Worms Rumble on July 3, 2020, to celebrate the 25th anniversary of the Worms series. It is the first game in the series since Worms W.M.D (2016). The game is envisioned to be a spin-off rather than a mainline installment in the franchise, as it replaces the series' traditional turn-based artillery gameplay with real-time combat. An open beta was released on November 6, 2020. The game was released for Windows, PlayStation 4 and PlayStation 5 on December 1, 2020, with cross-platform play enabled. Team17 has announced that the ports of Worms Rumble for Nintendo Switch, Xbox One and Xbox Series X/S are planned for a 2021 release. The new versions were released on June 23, 2021, and include platform-exclusive costumes. The game was added to the Xbox Game Pass service on the same date, with physical editions for all platforms to follow on July 13, 2021.

== Reception ==
Reception

Aggregate score
Aggregator	Score
Metacritic	(PC) 68/100 (PS4) 68/100 (PS5) 70/100 (XSX) 71/100 (NS) 57/100

Review scores
Publication	Score
Destructoid	6.5/10
Nintendo Life	5/10
Push Square	7/10

According to review aggregator website Metacritic, the game received "mixed or average" reviews. Christian Donlan from Eurogamer called the game "a hectic real-time delight" and noted that Rumble "completely subverts Worms". Fraser Brown from PC Gamer wrote that the game was fun to play, but expressed his disappointment that the game had deviated too much from the established gameplay formula expected from the series. Chris Carter from Destructoid awarded the game a 7/10, praising its gameplay and map design while lamenting the game's lack of content.
