= Clan Wars =

Clan Wars may refer to:

- Worms Clan Wars, a PC game by Team17
- Clash of Clans or Clash Royale, mobile games developed by Supercell featuring a game mode called "Clan Wars"
- Clan Wars, a minigame in the MMORPG RuneScape

== See also ==
- Video-gaming clan
