= Worms Crazy Golf =

2011 video game

- Cover art for the European PC version
- Developer: Team17
- Publisher: Team17
- Series: Worms
- Platforms: iOS; Microsoft Windows; PlayStation 3; Mac OS X; Amazon Luna
- Release: iOS, Microsoft Windows: WW: October 19, 2011; PlayStation 3: EU: October 19, 2011; NA: October 25, 2011; Mac OS X: WW: December 8, 2011; Amazon Luna: WW: August 11, 2022
- Genre: Sports (Golf)

Worms Crazy Golf is a 2011 sports game developed by Team17. A sequel to the mobile-exclusive Worms Golf, the game uses the basic framework of the Worms series as the foundation for a 2D golf title.

== Gameplay ==
The game utilizes a side-on two-dimensional playfield, as in the core Worms series. The goal is to putt a ball from the starting point on the map to the hole in as few turns (or strokes) as possible. There are also coins to be collected on each map which can be used to purchase unlockables including costumes, golf clubs and balls. Additionally, there are greenskeeper worms and sheep on the field that can explode when hit by the ball, and weapon crates containing perks and utilities. For some reason, the game does not feature online play of any kind.

Aesthetically, the game draws from the third 2D generation of the Worms series, specifically Worms 2: Armageddon and Worms Reloaded. To celebrate the release of Worms Crazy Golf, a golf-themed terrain style was added to the Microsoft Windows version of Worms Reloaded via update.

== Reception ==
Reception

Aggregate scores
Aggregator	Score
GameRankings	iOS: 81% PS3: 64%
Metacritic	iOS: 85/100; PS3: 61/100

Review scores
Publication	Score
IGN	9/10
TouchArcade	iOS: 3.5/5

Worms Crazy Golf was met with mixed to positive reviews. It holds Metacritic scores of 85/100 and 61/100 for iOS and the PlayStation 3, and 81% and 64% for iOS and the PlayStation 3 respectively on GameRankings. Keza MacDonald of IGN gave the iPad version of a game a 9 out of 10 score praising its unique game layouts and humor. GamingLives gave the game an 8 out of 10 score criticizing its camera but praising its beautiful art style.
