= Worms Battlegrounds =

2014 video game

- Developer: Team17
- Publisher: Team17
- Series: Worms
- Platforms: PlayStation 4 Xbox One
- Release: EU: 30 May 2014; NA: 3 June 2014
- Genres: Artillery, strategy
- Modes: Single-player, multiplayer

Worms Battlegrounds is a 2D artillery turn-based tactics video game developed and published by Team17 and was released on 30 May 2014 for the PlayStation 4 and Xbox One. It is a console port of Worms Clan Wars, released previous year.

Set within a world history museum, the single-player story follows the player's worms attempt to retrieve the concrete donkey's stone carrot from Lord Darius-Mesmer, a worm who is using it to try to take over the world. The game is narrated by Tara Pinkle, a Lara Croft parody who is voiced by Katherine Parkinson.

== Gameplay ==
Worms Battlegrounds is an artillery turn-based tactics/strategy game. Gameplay follows on the earlier games of the series, in which teams of worms take turns to use a variety of weapons and items in order to eliminate the opposing teams. It continues to use the mechanic that was introduced in Worms Revolution, whereby players could select their worms from four different classes: Soldier, Scout, Scientist and Heavy, which all had different play styles unique to each class.

The game includes a total of sixty-five weapons and utilities. Among the ten new weapons is a teleport gun, which was created in response to criticism that the ninja rope wasn't authentic compared with older games. In an interview with Digital Spy producer Davd Wood explained: "We had to completely throw out the physics system for Revolution, Clan Wars and Battlegrounds, because we wanted to bring in dynamic water, we wanted to bring in physics objects,"

The Xbox One version enables Xbox SmartGlass to keep track of stats, while the light bar on the PlayStation 4's DualShock 4 controller changes its color depending on the status of the player's worm. The speech from the worms can also be heard through the DualShock 4's internal speaker.

== Additional content ==
The first additional downloadable content pack for Worms Battlegrounds was titled Alien Invasion, and added various items to the game. It was released in January 2015. The pack adds a new game mode called 'Body Count' in which the player scores points for killing worms, as well as adding more campaign levels for the player to complete. In addition, weapons were added to the game, such as the Plasma Blaster, Energy Orbs and a UFO Strike, as well as adding various new customizable items to decorate the player's worms. The pack also added five trophies and achievements to its list. Alien Invasion was released on January 12 for Xbox One and January 21 for PlayStation 4.

== Reception ==
Reception

Aggregate score
Aggregator	Score
Metacritic	(PS4) 62/100 (XONE) 70/100

Review scores
Publication	Score
Destructoid	7.5/10
Push Square	6/10

Worms Battlegrounds received mixed reviews. It has a Metacritic score of 62/100 and 70/100 for the PlayStation 4 and Xbox One versions respectively.
