= Snails (video game) =

2002 video game

- Developer: PDAmill
- Platform: Pocket PC
- Release: 2002
- Genre: Shooting
- Modes: Human vs CPU, CPU vs CPU, Human vs Human, Network multiplayer

Snails is a shooting game by PDAmill for Windows Mobile. There was also a version for Palm OS, now discontinued, and alpha/beta versions for Symbian and Microsoft Windows, which have not been updated in over a year. In the game, the players play as a race of snails (Moogums, Lupeez, or Nooginz) planning world conquest (of the planet Schnoogie) in either Missions or Deathmatch modes. In Missions mode, players complete levels to unlock new weapons and the final mission. In Deathmatch mode, players simply fight and kill enemy snails. There are four Deathmatch modes: Human vs. CPU, CPU vs. CPU, Human vs. Human, and Human vs. Human (network play). The game features many destructive weapons, including teargas, which is deadly because the salt from a snail's tears dry out its body.

This game won the 2004 Pocket PC Magazine award for shooting games.

Some have observed that the game is inspired by, or similar to, the Worms series.
