= Worms: A Space Oddity =

2008 video game

- Developer: Team17
- Publisher: THQ
- Series: Worms
- Platform: Wii
- Release: NA: March 18, 2008; AU: March 27, 2008; EU: March 28, 2008
- Genres: Artillery, Strategy
- Modes: Single-player, multiplayer

Worms: A Space Oddity is an artillery tactical video game developed by Team17 and published by THQ for exclusively on the Wii. It was released on March 18, 2008 in North America, with other regions following shortly afterwards.

== Gameplay ==
Gameplay is very similar to previous versions in the Worms series.

Worms: A Space Oddity uses gesture based controls which allow players to launch various attacks. The game is rendered in 2D. The name is a reference to both 2001: A Space Odyssey and David Bowie's song "Space Oddity".

The game is set in space itself, with the usual arsenal of weapons being updated to suit. There are 6 themes included, namely Cavernia, Tenticlia, Frostal, Kaputzol, Mechanopolis and Earth. The worms are customizable in terms of skin color and helmet style, as in Worms: Open Warfare 2.

== Development ==
Worms: A Space Oddity was announced with plans to utilize a Wi-Fi connection and feature downloadable content. Team17 later scrapped the idea of network play, with the publisher stating that it would be better if the players were able to taunt each other and play face-to-face.

== Reception ==
Reception

Aggregate score
Aggregator	Score
Metacritic	65/100

Review scores
Publication	Score
1Up.com	B+
Eurogamer	4 out of 10
G4	3 out of 5
GamePro	3.75 out of 5
IGN	7.0 out of 10

Worms: A Space Oddity received "mixed or average" reviews from critics, according to review aggregator website Metacritic. While Eurogamer claimed that the gesture-based control is gimmicky and unreliable, most review sites said just the opposite, with IGN noting that "the first DS Worms... was drastically hurt by a sloppy control method, but that is entirely not the case this time around", and 1UP.com commenting that "the Wii motion controls are initially as friendly as a Rancor beast, but they're just as easily conquered", and "after a few Wiimote stabs, swings, and pumps, you'll probably never want to go back to traditional button-pressing controls".
