= Worms W.M.D =

2016 video game

- Developer: Team17
- Publisher: Team17
- Series: Worms
- Platforms: Linux; OS X; PlayStation 4; Windows; Xbox One; Nintendo Switch; Android; iOS
- Release: Linux, OS X, PlayStation 4, Windows, Xbox One; 23 August 2016; Switch; 23 November 2017; Stadia; 1 July 2022 iOS, Android; 11 April 2023
- Genres: Artillery, strategy
- Modes: Single-player, multiplayer

Worms W.M.D is a 2D artillery turn-based tactics video game developed and published by Team17. It is the nineteenth installment in the Worms series, and was released on 23 August 2016 for Linux, OS X, PlayStation 4, Microsoft Windows, and Xbox One. It was later released on 23 November 2017 for Switch, on 1 July 2022 for Stadia and on 11 April 2023 for iOS and Android.

Its gameplay resembles that of Worms Armageddon more than previous installments, while adding new features that range from interactive vehicles such as tanks, to buildings that the worms can enter for protection. It is also notable for being the first major redesign the worm characters have received since Worms 3D.

== Name ==
Team17 released many teaser trailers, with the video ending in a different meaning for W.M.D, among them were: Weapons of Mass Destruction, Wonderful Multiplayer Destruction, We've Massive Discounts, We Make Devastation, We'll Make You Dangerous, Worms Must Die, Well That's Me Dead, Worms in Many Destinations, Walking Mechanised Destruction, We're Mighty Dangerous, We Make Do, Wrongdoers Madmen & Delinquents and Weaponize Maintain Defend.

== Gameplay ==
Screenshot featuring a helicopter as a new feature for the franchise

Worms W.M.D aims to replicate the gameplay of Worms Armageddon, with graphics and game design returned to a 2D interface. Gameplay elements from previous installments, such as classes, water physics and dynamic objects, are all removed. A new feature includes the ability for players to craft weapons by gathering parts, whether from special crates or by dismantling weapons; players can craft their weapons even outside of their turns. New weapons and utilities are added, such as a dodgy phone battery and a bazooka that creates fiery explosions; classic weapons such as the Holy Hand Grenade return as well. Returning from Worms Forts: Under Siege are buildings that the worms can enter to a tactical advantage. Worms can utilize these buildings as a cover from enemy fire or to launch a surprise attack on enemy worms.

For the first time, vehicles and gun turrets are introduced, which can alter gameplay in many ways. Worms can enter vehicles such as tanks, helicopters and mechs that are available from the start or can be spawned by airdrops, to rain fire upon the enemy worms. Turrets, such as machine gun, mortar, flamethrower, and sniper rifle, can be used for greater damage within the line of sight. Like normal worms, both vehicles and turrets can take damage and be destroyed if they take too much damage.

Much like in previous games, worms are separated in teams. Players can choose whether to use any preset team available or assemble a team of their own. Teams can be customised with a selection of fortresses, outfits, speechbanks, victory dances, gravestones, and fanfares to help tell them apart from other teams, in addition to giving names to worms and the team itself. The name of each worm within one team is linked to the theme of the team's name.

== Release ==
Worms W.M.D was released on Linux, OS X, PlayStation 4, Windows, and Xbox One on 23 August 2016. It was also released on Nintendo Switch on 23 November 2017, on Stadia on 1 July 2022 and on iOS and Android on 11 April 2023.

=== All-Stars ===
On 12 July 2016, as a pre-order bonus, Team17 announced an expansion pack called Worms W.M.D All-Stars, featuring extra content themed after various other video games, such as the Octane Battle Car from Rocket League, additional worm customisation items, various thematic weapons and extra missions. On 15 November 2016, All-Stars was released for free to all players. The Steam and Xbox One versions of Worms W.M.D All-Stars each also come with exclusive content themed after Team Fortress 2 and various Rare properties respectively.

=== Nintendo Switch ===
Following the August 2017 Nindies Showcase presentation, Team17 had confirmed Worms W.M.D a release for the Nintendo Switch. The game released digitally on the Nintendo Switch eShop on 23 November 2017 worldwide. Team17 initially partnered with Sold Out Sales & Marketing in November 2017 with a plan to release physical retail copies by 2018. However, in February 2018, Team17 then cancelled their plans for a physical release. UK publisher Super Rare Games issued a limited physical retail release for the Nintendo Switch in October 2018.

== Reception ==
Reception

Aggregate scores
Aggregator	Score			
Aggregator	NS	PC	PS4	Xbox One
GameRankings	83/100	80/100	78/100	75/100
Metacritic	83/100	76/100	78/100	75/100

Review scores
Publication	Score			
Publication	NS	PC	PS4	Xbox One
Destructoid	N/A	N/A	N/A	7/10
GameSpot	N/A	8/10	N/A	8/10
IGN	N/A	N/A	7.8/10	N/A
Nintendo Life	7/10	N/A	N/A	N/A

Worms W.M.D received "generally positive" reviews, according to video game review aggregator website Metacritic. GameSpot rated the game 8 out of 10 and said "The relatively simple gameplay is overflowing with finesse and strategy, the presentation is fantastic, and offline or on, Worms is just incredibly fun." IGN praised the new crafting system but took issue with the buildings element, saying it was hard to discern which buildings could be entered and where their entrance points were.

Game Rant praised the new additions to the gameplay and called it "the game Worms fans have been waiting for since Worms Armageddon." DarkZero gave the Nintendo Switch version of the game 8 out of 10 praising its good selection of offline missions and rewarding training.
