= Worms Ultimate Mayhem =

2011 video game

- Developer: Team17
- Publisher: Team17
- Series: Worms
- Platforms: Microsoft Windows, Xbox 360, PlayStation 3
- Release: Microsoft Windows and Xbox 360; September 28, 2011; PlayStation 3: NA: February 14, 2012; EU: February 15, 2012
- Genres: Artillery, strategy
- Modes: Single-player, multiplayer

Worms Ultimate Mayhem is a 2011 3D artillery turn-based tactics video game developed by Team17. The game is a re-release of Worms 4: Mayhem with improved graphics. It features all-new content, story mode voice acting by Guy Harris, and other gameplay fixes such as reworked camera controls. The game features turn-based gameplay, a single-player campaign, and both local and online multiplayer. While primarily based on Worms 4: Mayhem, Ultimate Mayhem also includes content from Worms 3D, with its campaign and multiplayer maps included in the game.

The game was released as a digital download on September 28, 2011 for Microsoft Windows and Xbox 360 and on February 14, 2012 for PlayStation 3.

== Gameplay ==
As with all previous 3D Worms games, Worms Ultimate Mayhem features a 3D, turn-based artillery strategy that allows players to move freely in all directions. In the game lobby, players are able to choose from a wide variety of different weapons and use them when the game starts. At the start of the game, each player takes control of a team of worms. Due to the game's turn-based nature, each player controls one worm at a time within a set time limit; when the time limit expires, the worm fires a weapon, or the worm takes damage for any reason, the player's turn ends and game proceeds to the next player's turn.

The objective of the game is to eliminate all of the enemy team worms. There are two ways a worm can be eliminated. The simplest, usual way is to deplete the worm of its health using any of the weapons available; some weapons provide the ability to push or knock back worms. The other, faster way is to knock the worm into the water, causing it to die as soon as it comes there. Once all worms from a team are eliminated, that team is out of play. The last team with worms left standing is the winner.

Multiplayer gameplay allows for up to four players, online or locally, where they can choose from a few different game modes, such as Statue Defend, Homelands, and Deathmatch. In the classic Deathmatch game mode, the objective is simply to eliminate all opposing team worms. In Homelands, each team is given a home base and can only collect crates from the middle area, though the objective is the same as in Deathmatch. Statue Defend is similar to Homelands, but every time a worm dies, it will respawn in full health within its team's base, and there are also bird statues in each base, so the objective is to destroy all opponents' bird statues.

Single-player gameplay allows players to test their skill against AI opponents through a set of game modes, where they can also learn to familiarize themselves with the environment and the surrounding. These game modes include a tutorial series, a story mode and a challenge mode, all carried over from Worms 4: Mayhem, as well as a remastered Worms 3D campaign mode. Players can earn coins and unlock items for purchase in the shop through single-player gameplay.

=== Weapons ===
All weapons and utilities in Worms Ultimate Mayhem are carried over from Worms 4: Mayhem, along with the Binoculars from Worms 3D. These range from classic weapons such as bazooka, fire punch and concrete donkey, to newer weapons like poison arrow, sentry gun and bovine blitz.

=== Customization ===
Players are able to customize their worms with different accessories and a variety of unique speech banks to show off their unique style and personality. Players can also customize their weapon; creating something new and powerful to face off enemy worms.

== Reception ==
Reception

Aggregate score
| Aggregator | Score |
|---|---|
| Metacritic | PC: 66/100; PS3: 62/100; X360: 59/100 |

Review scores
| Publication | Score |
|---|---|
| Destructoid | 5/10 (X360) |
| GamePro | 3/5 (X360) |
| GameRevolution | B (X360) |
| GameSpot | 6/10 (X360) |
| Play | 80% |
| Push Square | 7/10 |
| TeamXbox | 6.2/10 |
| Digitally Downloaded | 3/5 (PS3) |

Worms Ultimate Mayhem received "mixed or average" reviews, according to review aggregator Metacritic. Critics usually praised the multiplayer and panned the camera angles, although Play magazine considered the latter improved over earlier 3D titles. TeamXbox believed that multiplayer was undoubtedly the best part for its breadth of content and customisation, but criticised the diminished dramatic effect of weapons on the environment compared to the game's 2D installments, as well as widely inconsistent artificial intelligence ranging from incompetence in campaign mode to firing bazooka shots with unrealistic accuracy in Quick Play. GameSpot noted some graphical improvement, but also lengthy loading times, particularly when restarting challenges, and that moves requiring dexterity, such as those using a ninja rope or a jet pack, were hampered by the game's transition to 3D and the resulting environmental structure and unhelpful camera angles. Whilst praising the wealth of weapons, it was disappointed by the weapon creation system, which it found was constrained to damage sliders and modifiers that still failed to produce a dramatic effect seen in the 2D counterparts. Destructoid criticised the controls, how the worms move, and the fact that, when paired with the turn-based nature of the game, both render single-player experience tedious.

GameRevolution's review was more positive. It praised the variety of game modes, and its attention was sustained by the cartoonish element of blowing up things, although it called the series' shift to 3D "a major mistake against the authenticity of the originals." Conversely, GamePro believed that Team17 could have delivered a quality product superior to the 2D games if not for basic shortcomings such as camera angles. The publication described the graphics as having an art style streamlined with high-definition video, but still being unimpressively simplistic. Digitally Downloaded was pleased by the variety of the single-player missions and the strategy involved, but felt that they become repetitive after some time. Push Square found aiming weapons to be cumbersome and traversing large maps to be slow and noted plunging frame rates due to large explosions, but praised the sound effects, music, and worm accents.
