= Worms 3 =

2013 video game

- Developer: Team17
- Publisher: Team17
- Series: Worms
- Platforms: iOS; Android; Mac OS X
- Release: iOS; 8 August 2013; Android; 28 May 2014; Mac OS X 12 February 2014
- Genres: Artillery, strategy
- Modes: Single-player, multiplayer

Worms 3 is an artillery turn-based tactics video game in the Worms series developed and published by Team17 for iOS on August 8, 2013, and released for Android devices via the Play Store and Mac OS X computers in 2014.

== Plot ==
Story mode consists of 27 single player missions across four themes: Beach, Spooky, Farmyard and Sewer.

== Gameplay ==
Gameplay follows on the earlier games of the series, in which teams of worms take turns to use a variety of weapons and items in order to eliminate the opposing teams.

Worms 3 is the first Worms game to feature card mode, which allows the player to alter the start and end of each turn. There are forty one cards in total, which must be collected first by unlocking in-game rewards and purchasing them. There are also four different worms classes, which first appeared in Worms Revolution, and new weapons.

Multiplayer and online modes are available, along with Bodycount mode, a new mode which challenges the player to beat their friend's score in challenges.

== Reception ==
Reception

Aggregate score
Aggregator	Score
Metacritic	74/100

Review scores
Publication	Score
GamesMaster	90%
Apple'N'Apps	1/5
Digital Spy	4/5
Pocket Gamer	4/5
148Apps	4/5
Modojo	4/5
Gamezebo	4/5

Awards
Publication	Award
GamesMaster	Gold award
Pocket Gamer	Silver award

Worms 3 received positive reviews. It has a score of 74/100 on Metacritic.

GamesMaster gave the game 90/100 and a gold award, praising the new card mode and called the multiplayer "so good it'll make you squirm in delight" Digital Spy's Scott Nichols gave the game 4/5, stating the while the game wasn't groundbreaking for the series, he praised the multiplayer mode and stated that the game "hits the right notes to offer fans the complete Worms experience on the go". Pocket Gamer's Harry Slater gave the game 4/5 and a silver award, praising its single-player and multiplayer modes but criticised the AI and stated that non-Worms fans would remain unimpressed. Gamezebo's Joe Jasko gave the game 4/5, praising the cards and amount of weapons but criticised the lack of tutorials for some weapons and game objects and level designs. Modojo's John Bedford also gave the game 4/5, stating that the game twisted the established Worms gameplay, but was "familiar enough to keep long-time fans happy". He criticised the sometimes choppy performance and lack of customization of the player's worms. Apple'N'Apps, however, gave the game 1/5, criticising the touch controls and gameplay and stated that the series "should have stayed in the past".

=== Awards ===
- GamesMaster gold award.
- Pocket Gamer silver award.
