= Worms Armageddon =

1999 video game

- Developers: Team17; Infogrames Lyon House (N64, GBC)
- Publishers: PC: EU: Team17; NA: Hasbro Interactive; PS1 and Dreamcast; Hasbro Interactive; N64 and GBC; Infogrames
- Producer: Martyn Brown
- Programmer: Karl Morton
- Artist: Dan Cartwright
- Composer: Bjørn Lynne
- Series: Worms
- Platforms: Windows, Dreamcast, PlayStation, Nintendo 64, Game Boy Color, Nintendo Switch, PlayStation 4, PlayStation 5, Xbox One, Xbox Series X/S
- Release: Windows: EU: 29 January 1999; NA: 24 June 1999; Dreamcast, PlayStation: EU: 10 December 1999; NA: 11 December 1999; Nintendo 64: EU: 11 December 1999; NA: 23 March 2000; Game Boy Color: NA: 19 January 2000; EU: 2000; Nintendo Switch, PlayStation 4, PlayStation 5, Xbox One, Xbox Series X/S: WW: 26 September 2024
- Genre: Turn-based strategy
- Modes: Single-player, multiplayer

Worms Armageddon is a 1999 turn-based strategy video game developed and published by Team17 as part of the Worms series. It was originally released for the Microsoft Windows operating system, and was later ported to the PlayStation, Dreamcast, Nintendo 64, and Game Boy Color. In the game, the player controls a team of up to eight earthworms tasked with defeating an opposing team using a wide range of weapons at their disposal. The game takes place on a destructible and customizable two-dimensional board and is characterized by cartoonish graphics and a unique brand of humour.

The third installment in the series, Worms Armageddon was originally developed as an expansion pack to Worms 2 (1997) and initially titled Wormageddon before it was released as a standalone game. As a result the game is very similar to Worms 2 but has a new single-player mode and adds a number of pieces of new content as well as being released on a wider variety of platforms. Worms Armageddon was acclaimed by critics, who praised the refined gameplay and stylized graphics, and it has been featured in a number of "greatest games of all time" lists. Worms Armageddon on PC is still updated periodically, most recently in 2020. The game was succeeded by Worms World Party (2001), which added further content without drastic change and which was the last 2D-based Worms game before the series moved to 3D.

In August 2024 during the Nintendo Direct, a port of the PC version to then-current and last generation consoles, titled Worms Armageddon: Anniversary Edition, was announced for release on 26 September. This version includes a digital museum and the emulated versions of Worms Armageddon for Game Boy Color, the original Worms for Super NES and Mega Drive, as well as Worms World Party for Game Boy Advance as bonus features.

== Gameplay ==
A screenshot of Worms World Party, Armageddon's successor. Armageddon's graphics are identical.

Gameplay in Worms Armageddon is turn-based, with each team moving in a randomly-determined sequence across two-dimensional terrain. During a single turn, a team can only move one of their worms (unless an item that allows the team to select their worm is used). Worms can walk and jump, as well as (when the proper items are available) swing by rope, parachute, teleport, and bungee. The objective of a traditional match is to defeat all opposing teams by killing their worms, although in the campaign some missions have other objectives such as collecting a specific crate.

Each worm begins the round with a specific amount of health, which is predefined by the chosen game options or by scripting in campaign levels. When hit with a weapon, the worm will lose health depending upon the power of the weapon and the directness of the hit. A worm can be killed either by exploding after having its health reduced to zero or by being knocked into the water around and below the level.

The game includes a wide variety of weapons, including melee, projectile, and explosive weapons, as well as airstrike-based attacks. Some are based on real-life arms, such as the shotgun, bazooka, and hand grenade; others are rather fanciful and cartoonish, such as the sheep, which serves as a mobile explosive, and the skunk, which releases poisonous gas. In a normal match, all teams begin with the same weapons, based on the chosen weapon set. Some weapons may not become available until a certain number of turns pass. Depending on the game options, additional weapons may randomly fall onto the terrain in airdropped and teleported crates. In addition to normal weapons, during team creation, each team chooses a special weapon which becomes available to them after a certain number of turns. The special weapons are more powerful than regular weapons and often offer special abilities; super weapons will rarely fall in weapon crates. These weapons are often based on cartoonish themes, such as the French Sheep Strike, and usually devastating in power. In homage to the film Monty Python and the Holy Grail, one of the game weapons is a Holy Hand Grenade, with a sound-effect reminiscent of the Hallelujah chorus from Handel's Messiah.

=== Gameplay modes ===
Worms Armageddon includes a series of training missions, a single-player campaign with premade missions, a deathmatch mode in which the player fights increasingly difficult and outnumbered battles against the computer, local multiplayer, and online multiplayer.

Local multiplayer allows the player to select which teams participate in the battle as well as the number of worms and handicaps, which options and weapons are used, and the level to be played on. The matches can use any combination of human and computer teams, provided at least one team is human. Additionally, multiple worm teams can form an alliance for the match by selecting the same team color – they will still operate separately in movement rotation but share weapons and score. If multiple human players are using the same computer, the game functions in a hotseat mode.

Online multiplayer is set up similarly to local multiplayer but allows the players to be at separate computers. Additionally, hotseat can be combined with online play, so multiple human players can use each computer.

Worms Armageddon features a multiplayer Internet service called WormNet. This service allows one player to host a game online and others to join it. The host can choose settings such as the landscape and scheme. In the past, a player score and ranking system was also present.

=== Customization ===
Worms Armageddon includes a very high level of customizability – in multiplayer games or skirmishes, the player can create custom game modes with preferred gameplay options and weapon sets. Regular options include starting health, whether the worms can move, how long a turn lasts, and sudden death options. Weapons settings include what weapons the teams start with, which weapons will fall in crates and how often, and how powerful individual weapons are. Worms Armageddon offers several levels of customizability outside of direct gameplay options.

The game offers players the ability to create their own custom teams. Each team has its own name and includes eight individually named worms. The player can also change the team's special weapon, grave marker, flag, victory fanfare, and voice set. In addition to numerous defaults available, the game offers the ability to import custom voices.

The game includes a random terrain generator, a basic terrain editor which allows the user to create the shape of the terrain with brushes, and a more complex terrain-import system which allows the user to import custom-made terrains in image format, which the game automatically converts into playable terrains.

== Development ==
Worms Armageddon was originally intended to be an expansion pack to Worms 2, but it was eventually developed as a standalone game. It was intended to be the last game of the Worms franchise, but Worms creator Andy Davidson felt that it needed more content before being released, leading to the development of Worms World Party. It was also going to be released under the name Wormageddon, but Team17 changed the name to Worms Armageddon because of close similarities to the name of the game Carmageddon. It was released initially for PCs in 1999 in Europe and North America, published by Hasbro Interactive under the MicroProse brand. The game was eventually ported to Dreamcast and PlayStation in December 1999, Game Boy Color in January 2000, and Nintendo 64 in March 2000. The Nintendo 64 version is one of the first Nintendo 64 games to feature a terrain editor and generator. A Macintosh version was being developed by MacSoft, but it has since been cancelled. Worms Armageddon was produced by Martyn Brown and composed by Bjørn Lynne, Karl Morton was the game's lead programmer, and Dan Cartwright was the game's lead artist.

Worms Armageddon was initially released on the Steam platform for a limited time as the preorder bonus for Worms Revolution. The Steam release included all improvements from the previously released updates. This release was made available on 12 September 2012. Worms Armageddon was released onto the Steam store as a standalone game on 20 March 2013.

Despite its age, Worms Armageddon still receives periodic updates, mainly from two programmers known as Deadcode and CyberShadow, recruited by Team17. These updates address bugs and compatibility issues, and also add new features to the game, such as support for a greater number of worms in a match and support for arbitrarily-sized colour levels. The latest update was on 16 July 2020.

== Reception ==
Reception

Aggregate score
Aggregator	Score				
Aggregator	Dreamcast	GBC	N64	PC	PS
GameRankings	81%	75%	84%	88%	83%

Review scores
Publication	Score				
Publication	Dreamcast	GBC	N64	PC	PS
CNET Gamecenter	8/10	N/A	8/10	7/10	8/10
Computer Gaming World	N/A	N/A	N/A	4/5	N/A
Electronic Gaming Monthly	N/A	2/10	N/A	N/A	9.25/10 (Note: Two critics of Electronic Gaming Monthly gave the game each a score of 9.5/10, and two others gave it each a score of 9/10.)
Game Informer	N/A	N/A	N/A	8/10	8/10
GameFan	N/A	N/A	95% (Note: In GameFan's viewpoint of the Nintendo 64 version's European import, two critics gave it each a score of 95, and another gave it 96.) (G.H.) 89%	4.5/5	90%
GameRevolution	B	N/A	N/A	A−	N/A
GameSpot	7.8/10	N/A	7.7/10	9.1/10	7.9/10
GameSpy	5.5/10	N/A	N/A	N/A	N/A
IGN	9/10	6/10	8.7/10	8.6/10	7.5/10
Next Generation	N/A	N/A	3/5	N/A	N/A
Nintendo Power	N/A	N/A	7.4/10	N/A	N/A
Official U.S. PlayStation Magazine	N/A	N/A	N/A	N/A	3.5/5
PC Accelerator	N/A	N/A	N/A	7/10	N/A
PC Gamer (UK)	N/A	N/A	N/A	90%	N/A
Official Dreamcast Magazine UK	8/10	N/A	N/A	N/A	N/A

The game received favorable reviews on all platforms, with the gameplay being praised across all versions.

Whilst writing that veterans of Worms 2 would find the game to be similar, Greg Kasavin of GameSpot praised the game for being easy to play and control, as well as its humor, graphics, physics, WormNet and deep customization. He also likened the single-player missions to Lemmings in that the missions often required the player to precisely utilize a limited supply of weapons and tools to accomplish the objective. Among his only criticisms are that the AI-controlled worms do not utilize their full arsenals and that the player would wish that there were more weapons, more diverse graphics and sound, and more content. Matthew Pierce of PC Gamer UK commended Team17 for addressing the lack of single-player content (i.e. the missions and AI) that the original Worms and Worms 2 had always been criticized for. Chris Hudak of The Electric Playground gave it a perfect ten, calling it "a gaming masterpiece." Tom Chick of GamePro said, "For all its similarities to previous cans of Worms, Armageddon is still a classic example of the joy of computer gaming. It's right up there with rare, benevolent gems like RollerCoaster Tycoon and Grim Fandango--games that'll make you smile and even giggle like a schoolgirl. And when it comes right down to it, I'd rather giggle for an hour than spend all day grimly swinging away at orcs or aiming plasma weapons." (Note: GamePro gave the PC version 4/5 for graphics, two 4.5/5 scores for sound and fun factor, and 3/5 for control.) Dan Toose of Hyper gave it 87%, calling it "A fitting end to an excellent series of games [and a] perfect blend of serious strategy and ludicrous humour." Nick Smith of AllGame gave it four stars out of five, calling it "very, very addictive". Cindy Vanous of Computer Games Strategy Plus gave it a similar score of four stars out of five, saying, "In short, it seems that Team 17 [sic] figured out every detail that might have detracted even slightly from Worms 2, then recreated the game without those tiny flaws. The result is eminently playable and often hysterical—in fact, the only thing serious in Armageddon is its strategy."

The Dreamcast version's reception was positive. Johnny Liu of GameRevolution praised the version for its "addictive" gameplay, its loads of personality, and not having to save money to buy multiple controllers for multiplayer, but criticized this version for the lack of Internet support, reduced customizations compared to the PC version, and the lack of a multiple-controller option. On the contrary, Ben Stahl of GameSpot praised the multiple controller ports as well as multiplayer for being fast-paced and turned into a "barrage of havoc", but criticized the single-player for the AI-controlled worms' nearly perfect accuracy and the length of time that it takes for such worms to complete their turns. He also pointed out that the worms' high-pitched voices are "only mildly cute" and can potentially be annoying, but praised the soundtracks for lending in realism to an otherwise unrealistic experience and the background music for helping players stay on task. Joel Durham Jr. of AllGame gave it four stars out of five, saying, "With fabulous gameplay and a stunning amount of options, Worms: Armageddon [sic] is sure to please. The sheer amount of effort that went into this title is commendable in its own right. Every development house could learn something by taking a few pages from Team 17's [sic] book." Cam Shea of Hyper gave it 79%, saying, "if this is the kind of no frills PC port we can expect for the Dreamcast, don't toss out your N64 just yet. You may just need it if you want to play the best version of Worms Armageddon on the block."

Jeff Nash of The Electric Playground gave the PlayStation version nine out of ten almost a year after it was released, calling it "a wonderful breath of fresh air for strategy gaming. With its carefree, happy-go-lucky attitude, it's easy to just fall in love with this title. With a multi-player mode thrown in for good measure, this game has a fantastic one-two punch of great gameplay, and an easy setup for sharing it with others, making it a very fun experience. With a liberal dose of humor present as well, this game is a wonderful romp through the grueling world of worm warfare." However, Mark Kanarick of AllGame gave it two-and-a-half stars out of five, saying, "Although not the best version of Worms, Worms: Armageddon for the PlayStation is a good party game and an occasionally fun single-player game."

The Game Boy Color port, while still met with favorable reviews, was less well received. Concluding that the port is an "abridged edition of the overall game", Craig Harris of IGN criticized the version's lack of features and personality compared to the PC version and pointed out its "quirky" graphics. The reviewer felt that the game's front end was "extremely thrown together". He concluded that it was still fun to play. Hudak of The Electric Playground gave it seven out of ten, similarly criticized the lack of weapons, and also criticized the lack of soundbites and complete lack of voices and what he perceived to be "microscopic" worms that are tough for the eye to see. He did, however, praise the terrain and physics engine for being well translated from the other versions of the game. Jason White of AllGame gave it three stars out of five, saying that it "has so much going for it in the fun department that the odd controls and sometimes hard to navigate terrain will be easily forgotten. Go out and give this one a try. It's well worth the time."

Many publications gave the Nintendo 64 version favorable reviews while it was still in development months before its U.S. release date. Lou Gubrious of GamePro said that the game's European import "won't dazzle you with graphics or stun you with sound, but it will suck you in with its simple playability. Before you know it, you'll glance up from the TV only to be greeted by the sun, rising like an eye-piercing, flaming disk punishing you for staying up all night again." (Note: GamePro gave the Nintendo 64 version 3/5 for graphics, two 3.5/5 scores for sound and control, and 4.5/5 for fun factor in an early review.) Arthur Adam of Hyper gave the same Nintendo 64 version 89%, saying, "This strategy game has proved to be dynamite on the N64, making it possibly the best multi-player title for the console." Marin Kitts of N64 Magazine gave it 85%, calling it "A welcome conversion of one of the most original four-player games you can buy." However, Michael Wolf of NextGen called the same console version "A good rental if you're planning a gaming party, but for day-to-day gaming, these annelids just don't cut it."

The PlayStation version received a "Gold" sales award from the Entertainment and Leisure Software Publishers Association (ELSPA), indicating sales of at least 200,000 units in the UK.

=== Awards ===
The PlayStation and Dreamcast versions won the award for "Best Strategy Game" at the EGM Game Blast Awards. The PC version was nominated for the same category at the Sixth Annual PC Gamer Awards, which went to Sid Meier's Alpha Centauri. The staff wrote that the game "put up one hell of a fight [for the award] and should not be overlooked by fans of the genre." The console versions were nominated for the same category at GameSpot's Best and Worst of 2000 Awards, which went to Ogre Battle 64.

== Legacy ==
Worms Armageddon has been placed on several lists of the greatest games of all time. Digital Spy ranked Worms Armageddon at No. 18 on their list of the top 20 Nintendo 64 games of all time. In 2014, GamesRadar+ ranked the game at No. 13 on their list of the top 50 PlayStation games of all time. In 2015, they also ranked it at No. 68 on their list of the top 100 video games of all time. In 2014, Slant Magazine ranked the game at No. 100 on their similar list. TechRadar listed the game as one of their favourite PC games of all time.

Team17 chose to base the source code of the 2016 game Worms W.M.D entirely on that of Worms Armageddon, because fans frequently told them upon questioning that Worms Armageddon was their favourite game in the series. Additionally, the 2009 game Worms 2: Armageddon was named in honor of Worms Armageddon despite not being a direct sequel.

In 2022, the PlayStation versions of Worms Armageddon and Worms World Party were added to the PlayStation Store as part of the first batch of downloadable PlayStation titles; the games run on emulation on the PlayStation 4 and PlayStation 5, but do not feature trophies.
