= Worms: The Director's Cut =

1997 video game

- Developer: Team17
- Publisher: Ocean Software
- Designer: Andy Davidson
- Series: Worms
- Platform: Amiga with AGA-chipset
- Release: 1997
- Genres: Artillery, strategy
- Modes: Single-player, multiplayer

Worms: The Director's Cut is an artillery strategy game, a sequel to Worms, developed by Team17 and published by Ocean Software. It was programmed by Andy Davidson and released in 1997 for the Amiga platform only.

The player has control of a team of worms and takes turns at attacking either computer or human opponents controlling other teams. The game builds upon Worms (1995) and adds various graphical and gameplay developments. The Director's Cut received positive reviews, but only sold 5,000 copies worldwide - primarily due to the game being sold at the extreme end of the Amiga's lifespan.

In 2021, it was announced that Worms: The Director's Cut would be one of several Team17 games included on the A500 Mini.

== Gameplay ==
The Director's Cut features turn based combat in the same style as its predecessor, Worms. The game has a 2D side-on view of the battlefield where players fight worms against each other. The game can be played against the computer, or with multiple players taking control of teams of four worms. The worms can use various weapons, some of which are limited in quantity. Each worm has a life meter and the team with the last surviving worm(s) is the winner.

The landscape of the battlefield affects the style of battle that takes place. Similar to Worms, The Director's Cut generates landscapes in a range of styles such as "arctic" or "beach". The game also adds a level designer, called "Graffiti Mode", which allows the player to design their own battlefields. There are various settings and options which allow the player to customise how a battle is fought. These include altering the power and availability of weapons, increasing or decreasing time limits and adjusting landscape settings.

== Development ==
The Director's Cut was programmed by Andy Davidson and enhanced the engine, graphics and gameplay of the original Worms. The game was developed solely for AGA Amiga systems and so was designed to take advantage of the more advanced graphics that these systems could produce. Davidson wanted to improve the original Worms to the best possible quality: "What I'm trying to do here is create the best Amiga game ever. It will also be the best version of the original Worms available on any platform".

There are 14 new weapons added in The Director's Cut, including the Holy Hand Grenade, common in the Worms series afterwards. There were also developments to the level maps. "Cavern" levels were supported, which allowed for matches to be played within a cave. The Director's Cut also featured a "graffiti" style level editor so the player could design their own levels with few restrictions. There were also graphical developments with the number of colours on-screen increased to 300. The game features nine level parallax scrolling.

Andy Davidson posted a screenshot of the game's title screen to Instagram in June 2018 with an updated version number of 1.5 Alpha and a build date of May 2.

== Reception ==
Reception

Review scores
Publication	Score
CU Amiga	91%
Amiga Format	90%

Worms: The Director's Cut was received well by critics, with Amiga Format and CU Amiga awarding the game 90% and 91% respectively. The game was seen as an improvement over the features of Worms, with many gameplay elements praised. The developments in the presentation also received positive criticism, in particular the added graphical layers was highlighted as an example of a "cosmetic correction". Despite the positive reviews, The Director's Cut only sold 5,000 copies worldwide.
