= Worms: Open Warfare =

2006 video game

- Developers: Team17; Gamesauce (DS)
- Publisher: THQ
- Series: Worms
- Platforms: Nintendo DS, PlayStation Portable
- Release: NA: March 22, 2006; EU: March 24, 2006
- Genres: Artillery, strategy
- Modes: Single-player, multiplayer

Worms: Open Warfare is a 2D artillery tactical game. It was developed by Team17 and published by THQ for the PlayStation Portable and Nintendo DS. It is the first game in the Worms series to be released for seventh generation handheld consoles and marked the series' return to its original 2D gameplay style.

== Gameplay ==
In Open Warfare, the player takes control of an army of worms. The goal of the game is to defeat the opposing army through reducing the health points of enemy worms using various types of weaponry while avoiding friendly fire and other obstacles. The weapons and gadgets the players use in battle include grenades, homing missiles, bazookas, cluster bombs, banana bombs (a Worms staple), dynamite, air strikes, shotguns, and many more. They can also choose from a variety of settings to battle in and make own schemes and teams.

The game is played in rounds with each worm starting with 100 hit points. Each team takes turns controlling one of their worms. The player is usually allocated 60 seconds per turn to move their worm around the battlefield and attack the opponent worms, though this time limit is customisable when playing non-career games. Only one attack is allowed per turn.

In addition to timing individual player turns, each round has a 20-minute time limit. If the round timer runs down to 0:00 before a team claims victory, every worm's HP drops to 1, creating a sudden death scenario. During the course of a round, crates containing health or weapons will occasionally drop and the water level will rise.

== Reception ==
Reception

Aggregate scores
| Aggregator | Score |
|---|---|
| GameRankings | (PSP) 71.29% (DS) 63.60% |
| Metacritic | (PSP) 70/100 (DS) 64/100 |

Review scores
| Publication | Score |
|---|---|
| GameSpot | 7.1/10 |
| GamesRadar+ | 3.5/5 |
| IGN | 7/10 |

Worms: Open Warfare received generally mixed to positive reviews from critics. Aggregate review websites GameRankings and Metacritic gave the PSP version 71.29% based on 21 reviews and 70/100 based on 22 reviews and the DS version 63.60% based on 25 reviews and 64/100 based on 24 reviews.

GamesRadar praised the graphics and the local multiplayer mode, but criticised the omission of online multiplayer and the artificial intelligence.

== Sequels ==
The original game spawned a direct sequel, Worms: Open Warfare 2, in 2007. A console port of Open Warfare, titled simply Worms, was also released on Xbox Live Arcade in the same year. The console version would spawn its own 2009 sequel, Worms 2: Armageddon, which in-turn was ported to PCs as Worms Reloaded in 2010.
