= Worms Reloaded =

2010 video game

- Developer: Team17
- Publisher: Team17
- Series: Worms
- Platforms: Microsoft Windows; Mac OS X Linux
- Release: Microsoft Windows; August 26, 2010; Mac OS X May 17, 2011; Linux; October 15, 2013
- Genres: Artillery, strategy
- Modes: Single-player, multiplayer

Worms Reloaded is a 2D artillery turn-based tactics video game developed by Team17 that is part of the Worms series. The game was first released on Microsoft Windows via Steam, on August 26, 2010.

Reloaded is a port of Worms 2: Armageddon, the sequel to 2007's Worms, itself a port of Worms: Open Warfare.

== Gameplay ==
Gameplay

Worms Reloaded is a turn based artillery game, in which players command a team of up to four worms. During each turn, players control only one worm from their teams. In the standard gameplay, the objective is to eliminate all enemy worms and be the last team standing. There is also a "race" mode where the objective is to reach the end point in less time.

When "Artillery" mode is not enabled, worms can move across the landscape. Movement is primarily accomplished through crawling and jumping, but items such as the jet pack and ninja rope can enable much faster travel and access to more terrain. The player has a preset amount of time to move or attack with the worm before the turn ends (5 to 90 seconds). Once the player uses a weapon, the "escape" timer starts, giving up to five seconds to move the worm to a safe position before the turn ends.

Reloaded features a wide variety of weapons, some based on real weapons and others imaginary. Some weapons fire in straight line, such as the shotgun, but many such as grenades and bazooka shells follow curved trajectories (from gravity and wind) and can attack distant targets behind obstacles. Several animal weapons such as the sheep and ferrets will move along the landscape and then explode. There are also several "air strike"-type weapons which are dropped from the sky towards the intended target.

A worm can be killed in two ways, either by having its health reduced to zero or by falling into the water below the landscape and drowning.

Weapons, utilities (such as jet packs and blowtorches), and health kits can be randomly airdropped into the level if selected as part of the game scheme.

== Customization ==
As seen in previous Worms titles, customization stands as a prominent aspect of Worms Reloaded. Players can create their own teams of Worms, choosing the names of the teams and naming each of the team's four worms. Each team also selects a voice set, victory dance, grave marker, skin color, and wearable hats, among other features. Many of the voice sets are classics from previous titles.

Players can also modify or create multiplayer game schemes, which define the gameplay rules and available weapons during matches. For example, the turn length can be adjusted, and the players can choose what objects may randomly spawn on the landscape. Additionally, Reloaded allows players to define the starting inventory of every weapon, and how long before that weapon becomes available for use. If weapon crate airdrops are enabled, more weapons will randomly drop to the landscape over the course of a game.

The game offers an in-game level editor, in which the players can draw terrain shapes and add basic features such as possible spawnpoints for objects. The game automatically fills the terrain's shape in with a landscape texture when the level is finished. Additionally, players can import full-color levels in image format.

While still flexible, the customization in Reloaded is simplified when compared to older PC titles. For example, Worms Armageddon allowed the player to choose for each individual weapon how likely that weapon was to appear in a weapon crate. Reloaded does not offer any control over which weapons can appear in crates or how frequently. Likewise, players can no longer adjust the power of each weapon individually. Team size has been reduced from eight to four, and sudden death scenarios have been reduced.

== Development ==
The game is largely based upon Worms 2: Armageddon (released on Xbox Live Arcade in 2009), but is said to be an 'extended edition of the console versions of late.' Team17 released few details or media content concerning the title before release, and a press release is not available. A select group of the public were allowed into a European and Worldwide Beta, however both were under a non-disclosure agreement (NDA).

On June 21, 2010, the official Team17 Twitter revealed that the beta testing phase had ended. The developers stated that the game would be released as a digital download only at a "very attractive" price.

The game was released on Steam on August 26. Two days before the release, Valve announced that anyone who pre-ordered or bought Worms Reloaded over the subsequent 10 days (August 25 through September 2) would receive a gift in Team Fortress 2.

Team17 stated that a Mac OS X version was in development. The Mac version was released on Steam on May 17, 2011. Users of the Mac version can not play a multiplayer game with users of the Windows version of the game.

The game was released for Linux on October 15, 2013, as part of the Humble Bundle with Android 7 promotion. Online multiplayer was not cross-platform, and only supported through the Steam version of the game.

== Reception ==
Reception

Aggregate score
Aggregator	Score
Metacritic	79/100

Review scores
Publication	Score
GameRevolution	7/10
GameSpot	8/10
IGN	8.5/10
PC Gamer (UK)	74/100
Pocket Gamer	3.5/5

Worms Reloaded has received generally favorable reviews. On Metacritic its score is 79 out of 100, based on more than 28 critic reviews while it rank on GameRankings is 81%.

GameSpot commented: "The latest entry in the long-running Worms series further refines the 15-year-old formula and is one of the best yet", giving it an 8.0. Apart from that general praise, the game has received criticism on its user interface (UI). PC Gamer called the UI "ridiculously oversized"

Daemon Hatfield of IGN had said that "this is the biggest, prettiest Worms, yet".

Rory Young of GameRant gave a game a mediocre score of 2.5 out of 5, praising its LAN multiplayer but criticizing its boring single player and lack of windowed mode.
