= Worms: Battle Islands =

2010 video game

- Developer: Team17
- Publishers: PlayStation Portable; Team17; Wii; THQ
- Series: Worms
- Platforms: PlayStation Portable, Wii
- Release: PlayStation Portable: NA: 22 November 2010; PAL: 24 November 2010; Wii: NA: 23 November 2010; EU: 26 November 2010
- Genres: Artillery, strategy
- Modes: Single-player, multiplayer

Worms: Battle Islands is an artillery turn-based strategy developed by Team17 and part of the Worms series, released for the PlayStation Portable and Wii in 2010. Players take turns controlling teams of anthropomorphic worms and using whatever means at their disposal to destroy opposing teams and become the one with the last team surviving. Both versions of the game were released to mixed reviews.

== Gameplay ==
Like previous Worms games, Worms: Battle Islands is an artillery turn-based strategy game, in which players takes turns controlling teams of worms and firing a wide assortment of weapons and utilities with the goal being to clear the battlefield of opposing worms. The goal is achieved by depleting their health or knocking them into the water, drowning them.

The player selects either the multiplayer or Missions single-player mode. Multiplayer is available in hotseat mode and online. In hotseat mode, the player decides how many teams will fight on the landscape (up to four in the Wii version), as well as set the landscape on which to fight and define rules such as turn times and which weapons are available. The teams can be either human- or computer-controlled, the latter of which the player can assign skill levels. Online, the player can enter a session, interact with other remote players, and view player rankings. In Missions mode, the player can enter maps designed for training, complete campaign missions, and solve puzzle-oriented levels. In the campaign missions, blueprints can be collected and are necessary to build custom weapons in the game's weapon factory.

A new feature specific to Worms: Battle Islands is that each player has their own island displaying whatever abilities they have awarded to them for the online Tactics mode. These abilities allow them to make decisions such as positioning their worms or increasing their health 15 points before the battle commences. In Tactics mode, the one who wins can gain abilities from defeated players and add them to their island. Therefore, the player strives to defend and expand their island to maintain a tactical foothold over their opponents.

Players can also customise their teams in a variety of ways. In addition to naming their worms individually, they can modify their cosmetic appearance and set their teams' speech banks, victory dances, and UI elements specific to the teams such as health bars. A landscape editor exists whereby one draws and saves landscapes to be fought on for multiplayer.

== Reception ==
Reception

Aggregate score
Aggregator	Score	
Aggregator	PSP	Wii
Metacritic	72/100	58/100

Review scores
Publication	Score	
Publication	PSP	Wii
Destructoid	6.5/10	N/A
GameSpot	7/10	N/A
GamesTM	6/10	N/A
GameZone	N/A	5/10
NGamer	N/A	40%
Nintendo Power	N/A	7/10
Nintendo World Report	N/A	5/10
PlayStation Official Magazine – UK	8/10	N/A
Play	80%	N/A
PlayStation: The Official Magazine	8/10	N/A

The game received "mixed or average reviews" on both platforms according to the review aggregation website Metacritic.
