= Worms Clan Wars =

2013 video game

- Developer: Team17
- Publisher: Team17
- Series: Worms
- Platforms: Windows, Mac OS X, Linux
- Release: 15 August 2013
- Genres: Artillery, strategy
- Modes: Single-player, multiplayer

Worms Clan Wars is an artillery turn-based tactics game developed by Team17 and is part of the Worms series. It was released on Windows on August 15, 2013, but is now also available on Mac OS X and Linux. A console port, Worms Battlegrounds, was released the following year.

== Plot ==
Similar to earlier Worms games, the single player campaign features twenty-five missions across five environments: Prehistoric, Viking, Inca, Feudal Japan and the Industrial Revolution. The campaign story focuses on a character named Tara Pinkle (voiced by Katherine Parkinson), who serves as the game's narrator, as well as providing missions for the team. In addition to campaign mode, the game also features ten Worm Ops missions that feature time attack modes.

== Gameplay ==
Gameplay follows on the earlier games of the series, in which teams of worms take turns to use a variety of weapons and items in order to eliminate the opposing teams. The game, like Worms Revolution, has four different classes each improved with new special abilities. This is also the first Worms game to add Steam Workshop support.

Worms Clan Wars has improved online gameplay. The game allows players to create clans and chat on WormNET, the game's own lobby and chat system.

== Reception ==
Reception

Aggregate scores
Aggregator	Score
GameRankings	72.50%
Metacritic	73/100

Review score
Publication	Score
Destructoid	8/10

Worms Clan Wars received mixed to positive reviews. It currently holds a Metacritic score of 73/100.

In August 2013, it held a GameRankings score of 72.50%.
