= Worms 4: Mayhem =

2005 video game

- PlayStation 2 cover art
- Developer: Team17
- Publishers: PAL: Codemasters; NA: Majesco
- Composer: Bjørn Lynne
- Series: Worms
- Platforms: PlayStation 2, Xbox, Windows
- Release: EU: 29 July 2005; AU: 16 August 2005; NA: 4 October 2005 (Xbox); NA: 11 October 2005 (PC)
- Genres: Artillery, strategy
- Modes: Single-player, multiplayer

Worms 4: Mayhem is a 3D artillery turn-based tactics video game developed by Team17 and published by Codemasters and Majesco. It is the eighth installment in the Worms series, and the successor to Worms 3D. The game was released in 2005 for PlayStation 2, Xbox and Windows.

== Plot ==
The player's team of worms arrives at Worminkle University, where they meet Professor Worminkle, who trains the team to use various weapons. Worminkle then sets the team assignments to sneak into enemy buildings and destroy their construction sites. To flee government agents, Worminkle and the team travel back in time to the Middle Ages using Worminkle's time machine, but the machine gets damaged as they are ambushed by wizards and knights. After fighting through them, the team proceed to the Wild West to find gold to keep the machine powered, fighting Boggy the Kid in the process, and to Ancient Arabia to recover jewels stolen by Ali Baboon and his pesky thieves and keep the machine's navigation controls balanced.

After recovering the jewels, Worminkle fixes the machine, but accidentally drops a letter. The team reads the letter, which reveals that the government was planning to build a new research laboratory to replace Worminkle University. Worminkle quickly takes the letter back and continues the journey with the team. However, they end up travelling far back to the Stone Age, where Worminkle betrays the team, revealing to them that he actually used them as part of his plan to escape from the Government. Planning to abandon the team in the Stone Age, he flees, but crashes into a mountain, forcing him to fix the time machine.

Determined to catch Worminkle, the team battle through caveworms and dinoworms. Once they manage to reach Worminkle on a volcano island, the team, having acknowledged what he did to them, steals the time machine and travels back to the present day, leaving Worminkle stranded in the Stone Age.

== Gameplay ==
Gameplay follows on that of Worms 3D, in which teams of worms take turns to use a variety of weapons and items in order to eliminate the opposing team(s). New features include the ability to customize their worm's appearance as well as create their own unique weapons in a new feature called "The Weapon Factory". The game also contains a shop where players can buy various items, using points won by completing story missions, challenges, or unlocking trophies. Shop items include new maps, new accessories and attire, personality banks (voices) and game styles.

In a series first, Worms 4: Mayhem's story mode provides cutscenes before each mission to reveal background information. The game also has additional game modes, such as Challenge mode, which presents the player with various missions to complete. Multiplayer mode is available via Hotseat. Online mode is also available on the PC version. On the Xbox, multiplayer was available until the termination of Xbox Live on April 15, 2010. Worms 4 Mayhem is now playable online again on the replacement Xbox Live servers called Insignia.

== Reception ==
Reception

Aggregate score
Aggregator	Score
Metacritic	71/100 (PC)

Review scores
Publication	Score
1Up.com	A+
Eurogamer	6 out of 10
GameSpot	6.2 out of 10
IGN	7.5 out of 10
X-Play	3/5

Worms 4: Mayhem received "mixed or average" reviews, according to review aggregator website Metacritic. The game was criticized for its lack of difference from previous 3D Worms games, difficult controls, and illogical AI. However, the range of weapons were praised for including both new and existing weapons, along with the level design.
