= Worms 2: Armageddon =

2009 video game

- Developer: Team17
- Publisher: Team17
- Series: Worms
- Platforms: Xbox 360, PlayStation 3, iOS, Android
- Release: Xbox 360; July 1, 2009; PlayStation 3: EU: September 8, 2010; NA: September 14, 2010; iOS; October 27, 2010; Android; April 9, 2013
- Genres: Artillery, strategy
- Modes: Single-player, multiplayer

Worms 2: Armageddon is a 2D artillery turn-based tactics video game developed by Team17 and part of the Worms series, released on July 1, 2009 on Xbox Live Arcade. The game is a follow-up to the 2007 Worms game, which in-turn was a port of 2006's Worms: Open Warfare.

A PC port, titled Worms Reloaded, was later released on August 26, 2010.

== Gameplay ==
=== Single-player modes ===
- Single-player campaign with 30 missions, of progressing difficulty, and five extra missions, which can be bought from the shop.
- Training mode which includes tutorials on aiming weapons and navigating the players Worm around levels. Also includes firing ranges wherein all weapons are available to the player for aiming practice, and can freely spawn enemy worms or targets on the level to fire upon.

=== Multiplayer ===
Six game styles are available for local multiplayer matches: Beginner, Standard, Pro, Fort, Rope Racing and Crazy Crates, with Rope Racing only being playable in player and private matches. Ranked matches can only be played with two players, whereas player and private matches support four players. Local Match that supports four-player offline matches.

=== Downloadable content ===
Six downloadable content packs with additional gameplay content have been released for Worms 2: Armageddon: the Battle Pack, Mayhem Pack, Retro Pack, Forts Pack, Puzzle Pack, and Time Attack Pack. The Battle Pack was released in July 2010. It includes new weapons, new forts, additional single-player content, and a horde game mode. The Mayhem Pack was released for free to promote the upcoming release of Worms Ultimate Mayhem.

=== PlayStation 3 content ===
The PlayStation 3 version has hats for Worms to wear in the game, and they include a MotorStorm helmet, a Helghast Mask (from Killzone), a Sackboy, a Lemming and a Buzz wig.

=== iOS content ===
The iPhone/iPad version also has platform-specific Worm hats, all themed around Angry Birds. The red bird, yellow bird, black bird, white bird, mustache pig and king pig make up the hats.

== Reception ==
Reception

Aggregate score
Aggregator	Score
Metacritic	X360: 84/100; PS3: 76/100

Review scores
Publication	Score
GameRevolution	7/10
GameSpot	8/10
GamesRadar+	4.5/5
IGN	(X360) 8.5/10 (IOS) 5.5/10
Pocket Gamer	(iOS) 4/5

The critics' reaction to the game has been generally positive. It has a rating of 84 out of 100 on Metacritic based on 24 reviews. IGN gave it a score of 8.5/10, concluding: "This is one of the most fun multiplayer games around, and now the single-player campaign provides a satisfying experience, as well". Guy Cocker of GameSpot gave the game 8 out of 10 criticizing its short campaign but praising its high customization.
