= Worms: Open Warfare 2 =

2007 video game

- European cover art for the PlayStation Portable version
- Developers: Team17; Two Tribes
- Publisher: THQ
- Series: Worms
- Platforms: PlayStation Portable, Nintendo DS
- Release: AU: August 30, 2007; EU: August 31, 2007; NA: September 4, 2007
- Genres: Artillery, strategy
- Modes: Single-player, multiplayer

Worms: Open Warfare 2 is a 2007 2D tactical artillery and strategy video game developed by Team17 and Two Tribes, and published by THQ. The game is a direct sequel to Worms: Open Warfare and was released for the PlayStation Portable and Nintendo DS in 2007.

== Gameplay ==
The gameplay of Open Warfare 2 is similar to that of previous games in the series. The game is viewed from a side-scrolling perspective. The player takes control of a team of several worms, and is pitted against other teams of worms under the control of AI (if in Singleplayer) or another Human (if in Multiplayer). Actions are performed in time-limited turns that cycle through each team. The winning team is that which can kill the opposing teams' worms; this can be achieved by using various types of weaponry and tools, availability of which depends on the game mode being played. Battles takes place on randomized, destructible terrain, which are visually distinguished by themes; "Forts" mode takes place on two forts, whose terrain depends on the theme. The player is able to select victory dances and color schemes for their worms, and to make custom race courses or fort maps using the level editor.

=== Differences ===
The PSP version allows players to select hats for their worms, while the DS version includes some exclusive minigames via the "Laboratory" mode. A demo of the game has been released by download for the PlayStation Portable, and for the Nintendo DS via DS Download Station Vol. 7.

== Singleplayer ==
The singleplayer modes of the game are Puzzle, Campaign, Laboratory (DS only), and Training. Puzzle mode consists of over twenty challenges that require the player to complete a specific task, such as reaching an exit point or killing hard-to-reach enemy worms, with limited resources. The campaign is a series of thirty typical gameplay missions (plus five purchasable missions in the in-game shop) with a basic story. The campaign introduces and moves through each of the landscape environments. Laboratory is unique to the DS. This has four different sets of mini-games which utilize unique characteristics of the DS - one mini-game type has the player flying a worm through a cavern, blowing into the microphone to raise the worm's parachute to clear obstacles. Training consists of a series of three missions designed to familiarize players with the gameplay and control scheme, as well as several "shooting range" levels which give the player unlimited access to every weapon, and allow the player to spawn targets to test the weapons on.

== Multiplayer ==
Open Warfare 2 supports online and offline multiplayer. Modes include classic deathmatch, fort mode, and a new jetpack/rope race mode. The servers were shut down on 03/02/2009 due to a lack of players, server problems and that the game had been out of date for some time. THQ has been heavily criticized for this. This server shutdown only pertains to the PSP release. As of March 22, 2011 the DS version still has an active online community, with an online chat room being hosted at www.gtamp.com/worms. This room can be used to arrange matches, and chat with other Worms players. The chat room is utilized by Worms fans across the world, in a variety of time zones.

== Reception ==
Reception

Aggregate scores
Aggregator	Score
GameRankings	(PSP) 80.76% (DS) 80.39%
Metacritic	(DS) 81/100 (PSP) 80/100

Review scores
Publication	Score
Eurogamer	8/10 (PSP)
GameSpot	7/10
GameSpy	4/5
IGN	8.7/10
Nintendo World Report	9.5/10

Both versions of the game were praised by the gaming critic community. GameSpy called it the best Worms game to date and, comparing it to Worms: Open Warfare, said it "improves on the previous title in every way imaginable". They did note that the game was essentially unchanged and that the series, to some extent, is starting to get stale. They also noted that connectivity was buggy in the DS' single-card two-player mode, but that this did not seem to be a problem if multiple games were used. IGN's major complaint, about the Worms series in general, as much as Open Warfare 2, was that battles proceed slowly. However, this, along with the inability to save or restart mid-battle, were their only complaints. One reviewer also noted that the game felt "less like 'another good Worms game', and more like a definitive compilation for fans that also happens to be portable".

For the PSP version, GameSpy appreciated the sharper graphics and ability to zoom the camera out, making it feel "less cramped" than its Nintendo counterpart. One IGN reviewer noted that the DS version made good use of the DS' special features in its "Laboratory" mode and added that they helped to add variety to a stale series.
