= Worms 4 (2015 video game) =

2015 video game

- Title screen
- Developer: Team17
- Publisher: Team17
- Platforms: iOS, Android
- Release: September 3, 2015
- Genre: Strategy
- Modes: Single-player, multiplayer

Worms 4 is a turn-based tactics video game developed and published by Team17. It was released for iOS and Android devices on September 3, 2015.

== Gameplay ==
In Worms 4, up to three teams of worms take turns maneuvering a 2D map using weapons and items in order to eliminate the opposing teams. The game features a single-player campaign designed to gradually introduce game mechanics, and three multiplayer options consisting of a battle against the AI, hotseat, and online matchmaking.

== Reception ==
Reception

Aggregate score
Aggregator	Score
Metacritic	74/100

Review scores
Publication	Score
148Apps	4/5
Gamezebo	3.5/5
TouchArcade	4/5

Worms 4 received positive reviews. It has a score of 74/100 on Metacritic.

148Apps' Jennifer Allen praised the single player campaign and daily challenges, but noted that the online multiplayer mode "is frustratingly quiet and there's no sign of asynchronous multiplayer which would have combated such issues." Gamezebo's Nadia Oxford notes that the game continues the old-fashioned combat from the series but also found issues with the online multiplayer, noting that "the server has a hard time finding other live opponents, and generally has connection issues even if you're beside a strong Wi-Fi signal."
