= World Rally Fever =

1996 racing game

- Developers: Split, Team17
- Publishers: EU: Ocean Software; AU: Roadshow Interactive; ESP: Arcadia Software
- Director: Martyn James Brown
- Programmers: Jean‑Marc Leang; Tiago Mendes‑Costa
- Artist: Patrick Romano
- Platform: MS-DOS
- Release: PAL: May 5, 1996
- Genre: Racing
- Mode: Single-player

World Rally Fever: Born on the Road (also known simply as World Rally Fever) is a 1996 racing game developed by Split and Team17 and originally published by Ocean Software for MS-DOS. It offers timed stages where drivers navigate through challenging routes, often in off-road environments. It was later re-released by Sold-Out Software. World Rally Fever featured anime style art and characters which raced cart-like vehicles through various world-themed tracks, such as Scotland, France, the United States, Japan and several other nations.

The game was re-released in 2012 on GOG.com by Team17 with support for Microsoft Windows and pre-released with DOSBox.

== Gameplay ==
Gameplay screenshot.

World Rally Fever is a racing game in which the player raced across the world through sixteen tracks, each divided into four tracks based on the championships cups (Rookie, Amateur, Pro-Am and Pro) the player choose which serves as difficulty level (Pro must be unlocked by completing all previous cups). The player will travel the globe, and race in Scotland, France, the United States, Japan and several other nations. Obstacles litter the track, such as fences, sheep and hay stacks which can be jump over. Each of the four championships cups (or difficulty) serve as how difficult the four tracks is in that particular cups, ranged from easy (dealing with less obstacles and trap hazards) to hard (encountering more hazards and hard-to-traverse roads).

Before racing, there are eight characters to choose from, each with unique characteristics that affect the handling of their vehicle (those eight are composed of four pairs, whose cars handle the same). Once you have selected a cup and characters, you must qualify in the four races and accumulate the most points to win. If you place anything below third in a race, you will fail and the only way to continue will be to use one of your credits (one credit for Rookie, two credits for Amateur, and three credits for Pro-Am and Pro). Your game ends once you run out of credits. Otherwise, you will travel to the next course when you qualify.

Player will encounter power-up while racing which will benefit them, although some track does not feature them at all. These are acquirable by driving under special icons placed above the track. There are a totals of five power-up to use, ranging from throwing a bomb to dropping a box with a dung sign. Sometime the opponent will drop a box during racing, as well as a special reverse sign in which if collide with it resulted in your controls being reverse for a short while. The special reverse sign power-up is only exclusive to opponents.

== Development and release ==
World Rally Fever was developed by the Belgian studio Split, marking their debut project. According to the team, the concept originated around three and a half years before release, inspired by the introductory sequence of the Super Nintendo title Area 88, which featured a ground-scrolling effect that conveyed a strong sense of speed. Split sought to recreate a similar impression on PC, where they felt arcade-style sprite-based racing games were largely absent.

The small team initially worked remotely from home, coordinating through modem connections. Although they expected development to take only a year, the process was prolonged considerably as they learned to program for PC and recruited a graphic designer. During development, the rise of fully textured 3D arcade racers such as Ridge Racer pushed Split to revise the graphics and handling systems to remain competitive.

The game was coded entirely in assembly language to maximize performance on the hardware of the time. Split emphasized compatibility with a wide range of PC configurations, achieving frame rates between 23 and 35 FPS on a 486 DX2/66 with a VLB video card under MS-DOS. While the game could run under Windows 95, it was not specifically optimized for the operating system. Multiplayer support was limited to a two-player split-screen mode, as the developers felt that online play would have compromised performance on contemporary PCs.

Split signed with British publisher Team17, with whom they finalized the game in Wakefield, England. Although the developers anticipated finishing quickly, the publisher’s high demands extended the schedule. World Rally Fever was eventually released in 1996.

== Reception ==
Reception

Review scores
Publication	Score
Génération 4	3/5
Hyper	56/100
Joystick	84%
Micromanía	84/100
PC Games (DE)	51%
Coming Soon Magazine	89%
Pelit	65/100
PC Joker	69%
PC Player	3/5
PC Review	5/10
PC Team	86%
Power Play	65%
