= Worms (series) =

Artillery strategy computer game series

- The original Worms logo
- Genres: Artillery, tactics
- Developer: Team17
- Publishers: Team17; Ocean Software; MicroProse; Ubisoft; Sega; Codemasters; THQ; EA
- Creator: Andy Davidson
- First release: Worms; 31 October 1995
- Latest release: Worms Armageddon: Anniversary Edition; 26 September 2024

Worms is a series of artillery tactical video games developed by British company Team17. In these games, small platoons of anthropomorphic worms battle each other across a destructible landscape with the objective being to become the sole surviving team. The games are noted for their cartoony animation and extensive use of surrealism and slapstick humour.

The game, whose concept was devised by Andy Davidson, was described by the Amiga gaming press as a cross between Cannon Fodder and Lemmings. It is part of a wider genre of turn-based artillery games involving projectile weapons; similar games include Scorched Earth (1991), Gorillas (1991) and Artillery Duel (1983).

== Games ==
Release timeline Main series in bold
1995	**Worms**
1996
1997	**Worms: The Director's Cut**
1997	**Worms 2**
1998	Worms Pinball
1999	**Worms Armageddon**
2000
2001	**Worms World Party**
2002	Worms Blast
2003	**Worms 3D**
2004	Worms Golf
2004	**Worms Forts: Under Siege**
2005	**Worms 4: Mayhem**
2006	**Worms: Open Warfare**
2007	**Worms**
2007	**Worms: Open Warfare 2**
2008	**Worms: A Space Oddity**
2009	**Worms 2: Armageddon**
2010	**Worms Reloaded**
2010	**Worms: Battle Islands**
2011	**Worms: Ultimate Mayhem**
2011	Worms Crazy Golf
2012	**Worms Revolution**
2013	**Worms 3**
2013	**Worms Clan Wars**
2014	**Worms Battlegrounds**
2015	**Worms 4**
2016	**Worms W.M.D**
2017
2018
2019
2020	Worms Rumble
2021
2022
2023
2024
2025	**Worms Across Worlds**
2026
2027	**Worms: Galactic Tactics**

=== Main series ===
- Worms (1995)
- Worms: The Director's Cut (1997)
- Worms 2 (1997)
- Worms Armageddon (1999)
- Worms World Party (2001)
- Worms 3D (2003)
- Worms Forts: Under Siege (2004)
- Worms 4: Mayhem (2005)
- Worms: Open Warfare (2006)
- Worms (2007)
- Worms: Open Warfare 2 (2007)
- Worms: A Space Oddity (2008)
- Worms 2: Armageddon (2009)
- Worms Reloaded (2010)
- Worms: Battle Islands (2010)
- Worms: Ultimate Mayhem (2011)
- Worms Revolution (2012)
- Worms 3 (2013)
- Worms Clan Wars (2013)
- Worms Battlegrounds (2014)
- Worms 4 (2015)
- Worms W.M.D (2016)
- Worms Across Worlds (2025)

=== Spin-offs ===
- Worms Pinball (1998)
- Worms Blast (2002)
- Worms Golf (2004)
- Worms Crazy Golf (2011)
- Worms Rumble (2020)
- Worms: Galactic Tactics (2027)

=== Collections ===
- Worms United (1996; included Worms and Worms Reinforcements)
- The Full Wormage (1998; included Worms United, Worms 2 and Worms Pinball)
- Worms Triple Pack (2002; included Worms 2, Worms Armageddon, Worms World Party and Worms Blast Demo)
- Worms Collection (2012; included Worms (2007), Worms 2: Armageddon and Worms Ultimate Mayhem)

== Gameplay ==
The fully deformable landscape can be radically altered by the use of weapons, often requiring players to scrap their plans and adopt new strategies to cope with the changes.

Worms games are turn-based artillery games presented in a 2D or 3D environment. Each player controls a team of several worms. During the course of the game, players take turns selecting one of their worms. They use whatever tools and weapons are available to attack and kill the opponents' worms, thereby winning the game. Worms may move around the terrain in a variety of ways, normally by walking and jumping but also by using particular tools such as the "Bungee" and "Ninja Rope", to move to otherwise inaccessible areas. Each turn is time-limited to ensure that players do not hold up the game with excessive thinking or moving. The time limit can be modified in some of the games.

Over 50 weapons and tools may be available each time a game is played; differing selections of weapons and tools can be saved into a "scheme" for easy selection in future games. Other scheme settings allow options such as deployment of reinforcement crates, from which additional weapons can be obtained, and sudden death where the game is rushed to a conclusion after a time limit expires. Some settings provide for the inclusion of objects such as land mines and explosive barrels.

When most weapons are used, they cause explosions that deform the terrain, creating circular cavities. The types of playable terrains include "island" (terrain floating on a body of water), or "cave" (cave with water at the bottom and terrain at both top and bottom of the screen that certain weapons such as "Air Strike" cannot go through; this type is not available in 3D versions due to camera restrictions). If a worm is hit with a weapon, the amount of damage dealt to the worm will be removed from the worm's initial amount of health. The damage dealt to the attacked worm or worms after any player's turn is shown when all movement on the battlefield has ceased.

Worms die when one of the following situations occurs:

- When a worm enters water (either by falling off the island, through a hole in the bottom of it, or by the waterline being raised above the worm during sudden death)
- When a worm is thrown off either side of the arena
- When a worm's health is reduced to zero

=== Weapons and tools ===
The Worms series is notable for its extensive variety of weapons. With each new game that is released, weapons are added, though many were removed in the 3D versions for gameplay reasons. As a result, the 2D series has accumulated 60 weapons, and the 3D series 40 weapons.

The weapons available in the game range from a standard timed grenade and homing missiles to exploding sheep and the highly destructive Banana Bomb, both of which have appeared in every Worms game so far. The Worms series has seen weapons such as the iconic Holy Hand Grenade, the Priceless Ming Vase and the Inflatable Scouser.

Some of the bizarre weapons in a particular game are based on topical subjects at the time of the game's release. The Mail Strike, for example, which consists of a flying postbox dropping explosive envelopes, is a reference to the postal strikes of the time, while the Mad Cow refers to the BSE epidemic of the 1990s. The French Nuclear Test, introduced in Worms 2, was updated to the Indian Nuclear Test in Worms Armageddon to keep with the times.

Other weapons are inside jokes. The MB Bomb, for example, which floats down from the sky and explodes on impact, is a cartoon caricature of Martyn Brown, Team17's studio director. Other such weapons include the "Concrete Donkey", one of the most powerful weapons in the game, which is based on a garden ornament in Andy Davidson's home garden, and an airstrike known in the game as Mike's Carpet Bomb was actually inspired by a store near the Team17 headquarters called "Mike's Carpets".

Since Worms Armageddon, weapons that were intended to aid as utilities rather than damage-dealers were classified as tools. This classification mainly differs in the fact that they do not fall in ordinary weapon crates, and instead appear in toolboxes. Many tools were left in the wrong class for the sake of keyboard-shortcut conveniences. This was resolved in Worms 3D.

Some weapons were inspired from popular films and TV programs, including the Holy Hand Grenade (from Monty Python and the Holy Grail) and Ninja Rope (named the Bat Rope in early demos of the original game).

== History ==
A screenshot of Total Wormage, before it was renamed Worms. It featured darker tones than later Worms games, with more realistic effects and the ambient sound of a battlefield.

=== Creator ===
Andy Davidson is the creator of the original Worms video game by Team17. The game "Worms" is based on the 2D classic "Artillery", and originally did not feature worms, but the Lemmings from the popular game of the same name.

==== Background ====
Davidson was working on a program called "Jack the Ripper" for the Amiga personal computer, which allowed him to trawl the residual contents of RAM after applications had been run and quit. In this way, he "ripped" the graphics from Lemmings, and used them while developing his version of "Artillery". The original name of the game was Lemartillery, and it was created purely as a bit of fun for him and his school friends in 1993. The positive reaction he witnessed encouraged him to develop it further. Knowing he could never commercially release the "Lemmings" characters, he changed them to worms and changed the name of the game to Total Wormage.

=== Development ===
Created as an entry for a Blitz BASIC programming competition run by the Amiga Format magazine, a cut-down version of the programming language having been covermounted previously. The game at this stage was called Total Wormage (possibly in reference to Total Carnage) and it did not win the competition as Davidson did not include the source code, which was a rule of the competition. Davidson sent the game to several publishers with no success. He took the game to the European Computer Trade Show in London in September 1994, where Team17 had a stand. Team17 made an offer on-the-spot to develop and publish the game. It subsequently evolved into a full commercial game, renamed Worms, available initially for the Amiga. As the game was popular, it was regularly released for other platforms.

During the development of Worms 2, Davidson wrote Worms: The Director's Cut, a special edition produced for the Amiga. The Director's Cut would be the last Worms game released for the Amiga.

For Worms 2, the engine was redesigned using Microsoft's DirectX. The game would overhaul the series' visuals, dropping the darker tones of its predecessor and adopting a more cartoonish look. Worms 2 would be the first game in the series to introduce internet play. The following release, Worms Armageddon, featured the series' first campaign mode and was initially intended to be released as an expansion pack for Worms 2. Armageddon marked the introduction of "WormNET", an online services which required registration and provided leagues and ranks. A variety of "schemes" have been developed by the WormNET community that are often played instead of the official schemes created by Team17. Some schemes have "rules" agreed to by the players but not enforced by the game itself.

Worms 3D, released in 2003, was the first installment of the series with three-dimensional gameplay. The game features a 'poxel' engine, described as a hybrid of polygons and voxels (the 3D analogues of pixels), which allows for pseudo-realistic terrain deformation similar in style to the 2D games, in which the terrain was represented by a bitmap. The game was followed in 2004 by a spin-off, Worms Forts: Under Siege, and the fourth-numbered sequel, Worms 4: Mayhem, in 2005. In the same year as Worms 3's release, Team17 would announce the cancellation of Worms Battle Rally, a karting game that would allow players to frag their opponents.

Worms: Open Warfare, a handheld game was released in March 2006, returned to the original 2D gameplay. In addition to a sequel, a console port of Open Warfare would be first released on Xbox Live Arcade in 2007. In turn, the port would be followed by 2009's Worms 2: Armageddon, which was directly inspired by Worms Armageddon and tries to mimic the game's physics and several other aspects. Worms 2: Armageddon would itself be ported to home computers as Worms Reloaded in 2010.

In an attempt to revamp the series' gameplay, Worms Revolution was released in 2012. Revolution was a 2.5D game that features a class-based mechanic, with each class having their own advantages and disadvantages. Worms W.M.D, released in 2016, introduced vehicles to the series.

A board game was announced in June 2023 to be released in 2024.

== Reception ==
While initial installments were generally praised, later games in the series have been criticized for the lack of meaningful additions. In 2001, Metacritic quoted Worms World Party reviews with comments such as "it's virtually nothing more than an expansion pack for Worms Armageddon" and, as ActionTrip's Dejan Grbavcic put it: "And I thought that only Eidos was impertinent enough to keep selling the same game with a slightly different name...". In 2007, IGN included the Worms series in its list of game franchises that have jumped the shark.

=== Sales ===
The Worms series is commercially successful. Its combined sales by January 2002 had reached 6 million copies. By May 2014, 60 million copies of the games in the Worms franchise had been sold since launching in 1995. By December 2015, the 20th anniversary of Team17, the franchise had sold over 70 million game units. By March 2020, the 25th anniversary of Worms series, the franchise had sold over 75 million game units.

=== Awards ===
Titles in the franchise have received a variety of awards.

- "Most original game" - EMAP Awards
- "Best game" - BBC's Live & Kicking
- "Most original game" - ECTS Awards
- "Best game" - Micromania Awards
- "Best strategy title" - PSX Developers
- "Strategy game of the year" - EGM
- "Best strategy game" - Trophee d'or
- "Multiplayer game of the year" - GMBH
