= Worms World Party =

2001 video game

- PC cover
- Developers: Team17; The Code Monkeys (PS1); Fluid Studios (GBA); Paragon 5 (N-Gage)
- Publishers: Windows, Dreamcast; Titus Interactive; PlayStation, Game Boy Advance; Ubi Soft; Windows Mobile; JAMDAT Mobile; N-Gage; THQ Wireless
- Producers: Lee Clare; Paul Kilburn
- Programmer: Maurice Sibrandi
- Series: Worms
- Platforms: Windows; Dreamcast; PlayStation; Game Boy Advance; Windows Mobile; N-Gage
- Release: 6 April 2001: Windows; EU: 6 April 2001; NA: 16 June 2001 Dreamcast; EU: 27 April 2001; NA: 4 June 2001 PlayStation 14 December 2001 Game Boy Advance; EU: 4 October 2002; NA: 29 October 2002 Windows Mobile 3 October 2003 N-Gage; EU: 15 April 2005; NA: 11 May 2005 N-Gage 2.0; WW: 7 April 2009
- Genres: Artillery, Strategy
- Modes: Single-player, multiplayer

Worms World Party is a 2001 artillery turn-based tactics video game developed by Team17, and is the sequel to Worms Armageddon in the Worms series. As with the previous games in the series, players take turns controlling their teams and using available projectiles, firearms, explosives, and equipment to destroy all opposing teams and manoeuvre across a specified and highly destructible map.

Although fairly well received upon release, the overall reception of Worms World Party has subsequently become mixed amongst the Worms community. Some found it to be an improvement to an already good game, whilst others saw it as being too derivative of its predecessor and not worthwhile for Worms Armageddon players. Worms World Party was the last two-dimensional title in the main series before transitioning to 3D graphics, with Worms 3D as the first fully 3D Worms title.

== Gameplay ==
Worms World Party screenshot illustrating several worms and some landscape deformed by explosions

Like its predecessors, Worms World Party is a side-scrolling video game involving controlling a team of worms and using a collection of weaponry to eliminate any opposing teams. The worms can walk and jump around and use tools such as the ninja rope and parachute to move to otherwise unreachable locations.

The worms have an arsenal of dozens of weapons, ranging from longbows to bazookas and from fireballs to Holy Hand Grenades. There are also an array of special weapons, such as Armageddon (meteor shower) or the infamous Concrete Donkey. Some of these weapons are present in the worms' initial arsenal while others can be collected from randomly appearing crates during the game. For some weapons, such as grenades, holding the launching key longer shoots them further. The landscape can be deformed with any weapon, forcing the players to adapt to changing environments. Also, in addition to the nature-made obstacles, the maps may contain land mines which explode when a worm comes close to one, and barrels which explode when shot, spreading out some burning napalm. These often lead to very technical combinations where, for example, a worm is first hit with a grenade and is then thrown against a mine which sets off another worm, which hits a third worm who slips into the water.

The image illustrates a match between three teams of worms in a pirate-themed map. Over their heads the worms have their names and hit points. The colour of the text indicates the team the worm belongs to. Each team can be customized by the player's will, including the language the worms speak and the headstone that is left when a worm dies. The worms can also be drowned, in which case no headstone is left. In the bottom of the screen the remaining time and the wind speed are shown. When the time runs out, the water level starts to raise on each turn, drowning the worms at the lowest points of the map (this is called Sudden Death). The wind speed affects some weapons. Failing to account for it may turn a missile back into the worm who launched it.

The player can play against the computer, or can play against people on the same computer or over the Internet or local area network (TCP/IP and IPX supported).

The player can set up many options and make maps one can play on prior to battle to tailor the experience. There are also single-player and multiplayer missions available to help refine the player's skills with the various weapons and utilities.

== Development ==
After releasing Worms Armageddon, Team17 had plans to develop a fully three-dimensional iteration of Worms, resulting in the 2003 launch of Worms 3D. Worms Armageddon was meant to be the final game in the series using two-dimensional visuals, but Sega approached the company and asked them to develop an online version for the Dreamcast. Worms World Party is the first Worms game in which Andy Davidson, the franchise's creator, had no involvement since his departure from Team17 (Davidson later returned to the company in 2012).

Worms World Party was ported to Pocket PCs by JAMDAT Mobile on 3 October 2003. There was a port due to launch on the Gizmondo platform, but that was ultimately cancelled because of the console's short lifespan.

=== Worms World Party Remastered ===
A remaster of the game, Worms World Party Remastered, was released to Steam and GOG.com on July 16, 2015. The game is "remastered in 1080p and at 60fps", with new sound effects.

== Reception ==
Reception

Aggregate score
Aggregator	Score			
Aggregator	Dreamcast	GBA	N-Gage	PC
Metacritic	79/100	75/100	77/100	75/100

Review scores
Publication	Score			
Publication	Dreamcast	GBA	N-Gage	PC
AllGame	N/A	3.5/5	N/A	N/A
Computer Gaming World	N/A	N/A	N/A	4/5
Electronic Gaming Monthly	8.17/10 (Note: Three critics of Electronic Gaming Monthly gave the Dreamcast version each a score of 9/10, 8/10, and 7.5/10.)	N/A	N/A	N/A
EP Daily	N/A	N/A	N/A	9/10
Eurogamer	8/10	N/A	N/A	N/A
Game Informer	8/10	N/A	N/A	N/A
GameRevolution	B+	N/A	N/A	N/A
GameSpot	8.4/10	6.8/10	7.7/10	7.4/10
GameSpy	9/10	N/A	3.5/5	N/A
GameZone	8.1/10	N/A	8.5/10	N/A
IGN	8.2/10	N/A	N/A	8/10
Next Generation	4/5	N/A	N/A	N/A
Nintendo Power	N/A	3.4/5	N/A	N/A
PC Gamer (US)	N/A	N/A	N/A	75%
Maxim	N/A	N/A	N/A	3.5/5

The Dreamcast, PC, Game Boy Advance and N-Gage versions received "generally favourable reviews" according to the review aggregation website Metacritic. The main complaint in the individual reviews is that the game was too similar to Worms Armageddon with merely incremental improvements. Mike Wolf of NextGen said of the Dreamcast version, "Even with the online issues, this is Worms at its finest – quick, easy, fun worm-blasting action." Miss Spell of GamePro said of the same console version, "While true to the series, the simple 2D graphics don't push the Dreamcast's capabilities. The heroic music and the comic voices are the best part of the game, which isn't saying much. All in all, you'll want to let this one off the hook." (Note: GamePro gave the Dreamcast version two 3/5 scores for graphics and control, 4/5 for sound, and 3.5/5 for fun factor.) Edge called the same Dreamcast version "a purchase that can't be justified if you only plan to experience the oneplayer [sic] side."

The PC version received a "Silver" sales award from the Entertainment and Leisure Software Publishers Association (ELSPA), indicating sales of at least 100,000 units in the UK.

The same PC version was ranked Nos. 30, 70, and 94 of PC PowerPlay's top 100 PC games of all time in 2001, 2003, and 2004, respectively. It was voted by about 1.22 million gamers as the second runner-up for the Mobile Game of the Year in the Golden Joystick Awards 2009. Pocket Gamer retrospectively listed the port for N-Gage versions 1.0 and 2.0 as one of the 20 best games for the gaming phone.
