= Worms Forts: Under Siege =

2004 video game

- Developer: Team17
- Publisher: Sega
- Series: Worms
- Platforms: Microsoft Windows, PlayStation 2, Xbox
- Release: PAL: November 19, 2004; NA: November 24, 2004 (PC); NA: March 15, 2005
- Genres: Artillery, strategy
- Modes: Single-player, multiplayer

Worms Forts: Under Siege is a 3D artillery tactical game developed by Team17. A follow-up to the previous Worms game, Worms 3D, Forts showcases new features. While the primary method of victory is to destroy the opposing team, victory can also be achieved by destroying the opposing "Stronghold", the most important building in the game.

== Gameplay ==
In Worms Forts: Under Siege, the gameplay follows a similar structure to the main Worms series games, except players can construct fortifications that can strengthen the defensive potential of either team. Each player takes turns to construct fortifications and/or make an attack. Players can build a variety of these fortifications, which in return offer special bonuses that improve the defense of their own teams. Forts have to be constructed so that they are connected to a singular large fortification called the "Stronghold". A variety of forts are progressively unlocked based on players' performance on expanding fortifications across the land from the Stronghold via a network-like system. As the game progresses, the player can construct increasingly larger forts that are capable of deploying stronger weapons, or construct special buildings that provide special gameplay benefits, such as the generation of collectible health crates or weapon crates. Players can fire from special forts designed to deploy stronger siege weapons, compared to basic weapons such as the grenade or bazooka.

At the start of each game, each player starts with a "Stronghold", a large fortification with high health. Weapons are used to destroy buildings and their links. Isolated forts that have lost all links to the Stronghold are immediately destroyed. Destroying the Stronghold immediately destroys all forts and subsequently forces the associated team to forfeit. The player wins by defeating the opposing team(s), achieved by either killing all their worms or destroying their strongholds.

== Stories ==
Egyptian: The Egyptian story focuses on a worm named Seth, who tries to raise an army of the dead to battle the Pharaoh.

Greek: The Greek story focuses on a journey to Troy in the quest of saving a worm named Helen.

Oriental: The Oriental story focuses on the Mongol invasion of Japan, with map names beginning with Rise of and Fall of. The last map shows a destroyed Mongol ship, a reference to the tsunami which destroyed the Mongol fleets.

Medieval: The Medieval story focuses on King Arthur and his journey to become king of Britain. The last map is called "Mordred and Morgana", a reference to the last battle, in which Arthur was mortally wounded.

== Development and release ==
The game was announced on 29 April 2004. Sega of Europe would reprise its role as publisher following the success of Worms 3D. The game was shown off at E3 2004, where it was announced that Acclaim Entertainment would publish the game in North America following a prior deal made with Team17 for Worms 3D.

While the game was released as planned in Europe in November 2004 alongside the PC release in all territories, the North American console release was delayed after Acclaim filed for Chapter 7 Bankruptcy at the end of August. In January 2005, Sega of America announced it had picked up the North American publishing rights to the game alongside the Xbox version of Worms 3D. They would release the game on 1 March as a budget title.

== Reception ==
Reception

Aggregate scores
Aggregator	Score
GameRankings	(PC) 59.75% (PS2) 64.69% (Xbox) 67.72%
Metacritic	(PC) 60 (PS2) 63 (Xbox) 67

Review scores
Publication	Score
Eurogamer	4/10 (PC)
GameSpot	6.5
IGN	6.9

Worms Forts: Under Siege was met with mixed reviews. Aggregating review websites GameRankings and Metacritic gave the PC version 59.75% and 60/100, the PlayStation 2 version 64.69% and 63/100 and the Xbox version 67.72% and 67/100.
