= Worms (2007 video game) =

2007 video game

- Developer: Team17
- Publishers: Microsoft Game Studios (X360); Team17
- Series: Worms
- Platforms: Xbox 360; PlayStation 3 iOS
- Release: Xbox 360: WW: March 7, 2007; PlayStation 3: NA: March 26, 2009; EU: April 9, 2009; iOS: WW: July 11, 2009
- Genres: Artillery, strategy
- Modes: Single-player, multiplayer

Worms is an artillery turn-based tactics video game developed by Team17 and published by Microsoft Game Studios for the Xbox 360. Team17 released the game for the PlayStation 3 and iOS platforms. The game is largely a port of 2006's Worms: Open Warfare.

== Gameplay ==
Players control a small platoon of worms across a deformable landscape, battling computer or player controlled teams. The game features bright and humorous cartoon-style animation and a varied arsenal of weapons. Full voice communication is also available among the players of the game. The game includes a tutorial, single-player challenges, and competitive multiplayer for up to four teams either online or offline.

There is also a Quick Start option (choice of Beginner, Intermediate or Pro, uses default schemes and teams). If the player wanted to play a custom singleplayer game, they have to select multiplayer and then create a local game with AI opponents.

The time it takes to complete a challenge is saved and the best times are displayed on a leaderboard.

Multiplayer features competitive play for up to four teams. It is compatible for both offline or online play via Xbox Live or PlayStation Network.

== Development and release ==
The development and release of the Xbox 360 version of Worms was significantly delayed due to a disagreement during the certification process prior to release, over the requirement of an in-game means of providing opposing player feedback in post-game lobbies.

== Reception ==
Reception

Aggregate score
Aggregator	Score
Metacritic	(XBLA) 75/100 (PSN) 76/100

Review scores
Publication	Score
Eurogamer	6/10
GameSpot	7.5/10
IGN	7.9/10
Pocket Gamer	4/5

Worms received "generally favorable" reviews according to the review aggregating website Metacritic.
