= Worms (1995 video game) =

- Developer: Team17 (Note: Ported to Mega Drive and SNES by East Point Software.)
- Publishers: Ocean Software: MS-DOS Sold-Out Software PlayStation; EU/NA: Ocean Software; JP: I'MAX Saturn; EU/NA: Ocean Software; JP: I'MAX; BRA: Tectoy Mac OS GT Interactive Atari Jaguar Telegames
- Producer: Martyn Brown
- Designers: Andy Davidson; Cris Blyth
- Artist: Rico Holmes
- Composer: Bjørn Lynne
- Series: Worms
- Platforms: MS-DOS: PlayStation; Amiga; Sega Saturn; Amiga CD32; Game Boy; Mega Drive; Super NES; Mac OS; Atari Jaguar
- Release: 31 October 1995: MS-DOS; NA: 31 October 1995; EU: 1995 PlayStation; EU: 1 November 1995; NA: 7 November 1995; JP: 28 January 1996 Amiga; EU: 17 November 1995 Sega Saturn; EU: December 1995; NA: 27 June 1996; BRA: October 1996; JP: 14 March 1997 Amiga CD32; EU: 1995 Game Boy; EU: 1995 Mega Drive; EU: 25 July 1996 Super NES; EU: 27 September 1996 Mac OS; EU: 1996 Jaguar; WW: 15 May 1998
- Genres: Artillery, strategy
- Modes: Single-player, multiplayer

Worms is a 2D artillery tactical video game developed by Team17 and released in 1995. It is the first game in the Worms series of video games. It is a turn-based game where a player controls a team of worms against other teams of worms that are controlled by a computer or human opponent. The aim is to use various weapons to kill the worms on the other teams and have the last surviving worm(s). Level designs are randomly generated based on seeds, with over 55,000 possible level creations.

Worms entered production in 1990 under the title Artillery. Andy Davidson, the game's main developer, overhauled his idea after seeing how Commodore's Amiga refined his ideas while introducing new ones. Lemmings (1991) served as one of the main inspirations for the game, as Davidson wanted Worms to deliver a similar quality of animation and humour. Davidson would also have trouble pitching the game to developers. Eventually, after showcasing the game at a 1994 ECTS, Davidson would meet with Team17's co-founder Martyn Brown who immediately offered to develop and publish the game.

The game first released in Europe for the Amiga on 17 November 1995, with many console ports releasing in the following years. Worms initially received a polarised reception; the gameplay was generally praised while its multiplayer and similarities to Lemmings and Cannon Fodder (1993) divided opinions. Across all ports, the game sold around 5 million units as of 2006. Despite its mixed reception at the time, the game has been retrospectively cited as one of the greatest video games ever made. It was included as a title in the 2010 book 1001 Video Games You Must Play Before You Die. Its commercial success also spawned a franchise, beginning with Worms 2 in 1997.

== Gameplay ==
From the Amiga version: A scrapyard themed level, with the player using the blowtorch tool.

Worms is a turn-based artillery game, similar to other early games in the genre such as Scorched Earth. Each player controls a team of several worms. During the course of the game, players take turns selecting one of their worms. They then use whatever tools and weapons are available to attack and kill the opponents' worms, thereby winning the game. Worms may move around the terrain in a variety of ways, normally by walking and jumping but also by using particular tools such as the "Bungee" and "Ninja Rope", to move to otherwise inaccessible areas. Each turn is time-limited to ensure that players do not hold up the game with excessive thinking or moving. The time limit can be modified in some of the games in the Worms series.

Over twenty weapons and tools may be available each time a game is played, and differing selections of weapons and tools can be saved into a "scheme" for easy selection in future games. Other scheme settings allow options such as deployment of reinforcement crates, from which additional weapons can be obtained, and sudden death where the game is rushed to a conclusion after a time limit expires. Some settings provide for the inclusion of objects such as land mines and explosive barrels.

When most weapons are used, they cause explosions that deform the terrain, creating circular cavities. If a worm is hit with a weapon, they will lose health. A worm who is out of health will die by blowing themselves up and leaving a grave marker. Worms can also die by being thrown off the side of the map or by falling into the water at the map's base.

== Development ==
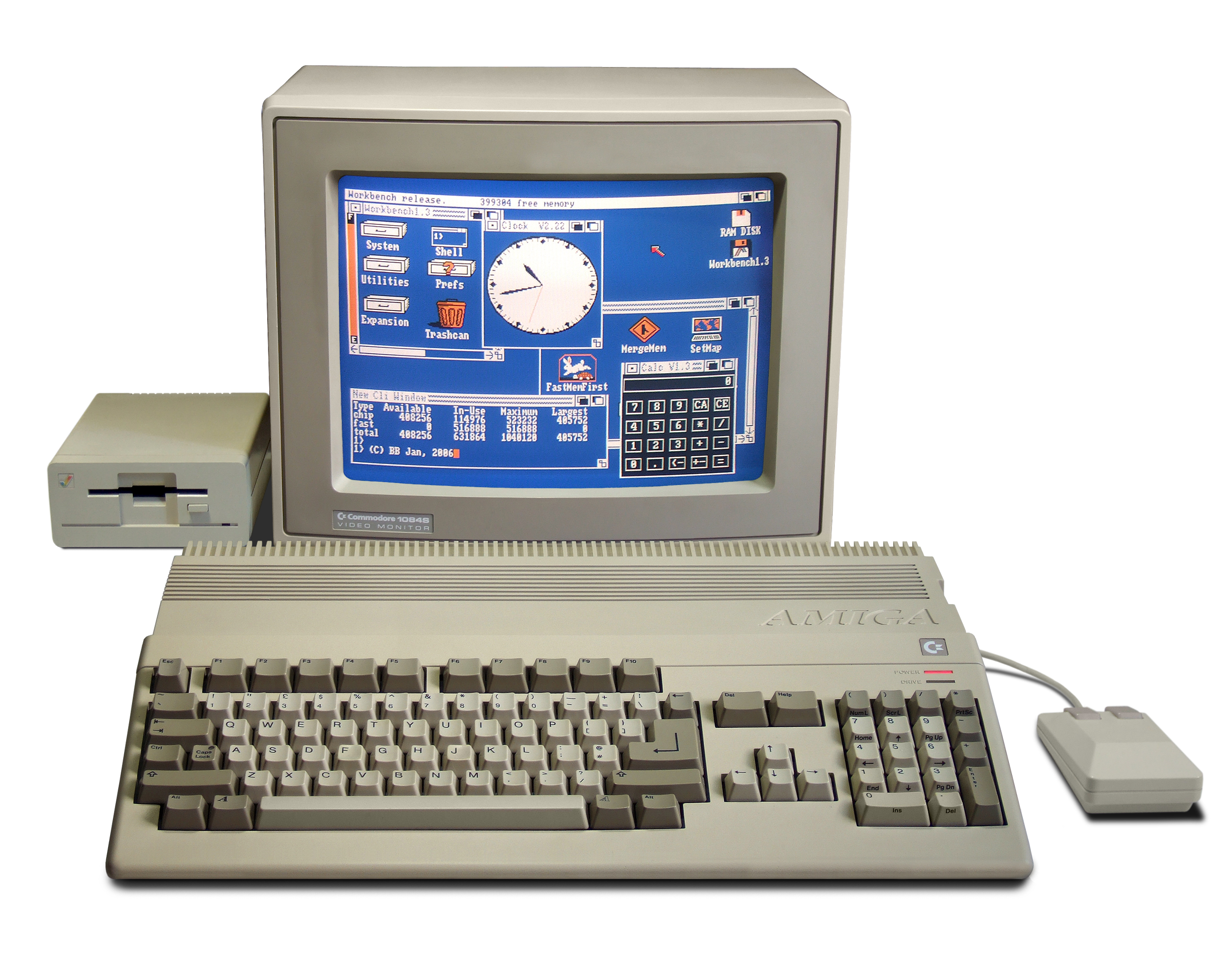
Worms originally began as an amusement experiment by Andy Davidson on a graphing calculator by Casio before moving development on the Amiga.

Worms was the brainchild of Andy Davidson, a then-unknown computer shop employee and fan of Amiga microcomputers since 1987. He began work on the project in 1990 under the name Artillery, based on previous tank games from the 8-bit era using a Casio graphing calculator as an experiment for his own amusement. Davidson later moved development of Artillery to the Amiga in August 1993, which allowed to expand his idea further, leading him to introduce new elements and a graphical style to distinguish his project from its spiritual predecessors. Davidson wanted to achieve the same animation quality and humour seen in Lemmings, which led him to employing worms as characters for his project after various character design experiments through Deluxe Paint.

With the addition of worms as characters, and inspired by a Blitz BASIC programming competition held by Amiga Format magazine, Davidson renamed his project from Artillery to Total Wormage (possibly in reference to Midway's Total Carnage). Featuring 55,000 levels, publications compared it with both Lemmings and Cannon Fodder due to its visual style and themes, which Team17's project manager Marcus Dyson later claimed was planned from start. However, Davidson's entry neither won the competition or reached any place for classification. Davidson then pitched his project to multiple publishers with no success, before showcasing his game during ECTS in September 1994, where he met Team17 co-founder Martyn Brown, who would make an offer on-the-spot to develop and publish it. Level designs are randomly generated by the use of an alpha-numeric string as their seeds. The object and landscape sets used to generate the field are arranged into thematics including forests, Martian terrains, beaches and hell.

== Release ==
Worms was first launched in Europe for the Amiga on 17 November 1995 by Ocean Software. Commercial ports of the game were released for Amiga CD32, Atari Jaguar, Game Boy, Macintosh, MS-DOS, PlayStation, Mega Drive, Sega Saturn and Super Nintendo Entertainment System. The North American release of the PlayStation version was the subject of considerable negotiation, as Sony Computer Entertainment had a policy against 2D games being published for the console. The Saturn conversion was a straight port of the PlayStation version.

The Jaguar version was published by Telegames on 15 May 1998; Telegames announced the release of this version after becoming the last remaining software publisher for the Jaguar. Like all of its other games published following the system's discontinuation, Worms could be purchased either through direct order from Telegames' US and UK websites or select retailers such as Electronics Boutique. It also served as the final Atari-licensed title ever to be released for the Jaguar; two months earlier, on 13 March 1998, JTS Corporation sold all the assets of Atari Corporation, including the Atari name, to Hasbro Interactive, who would release all of the Jaguar's rights into the public domain a year later.

In 2023, the PlayStation version of Worms was added to the PlayStation Store as part of a group of downloadable PlayStation titles; the game runs on emulation on the PlayStation 4 and PlayStation 5, but does not feature trophies.

=== Cancelled ports ===
In 1995, Team17 began development on a port of Worms to Nintendo's Virtual Boy platform. The game was to be published by Ocean, but was canceled only weeks into development as a result of Nintendo's discontinuation of the console. A 32X release was also planned but never released.

=== Expansion pack ===
Worms Reinforcements (1996) is an expansion pack for Worms, which was later amalgamated with the original game to create Worms and Reinforcements United (a.k.a. Worms United or Worms Utd.) the same year. Released only for PC, it added a single player campaign and the ability to add custom levels and soundpacks (which was already available for the Amiga version), in addition of full motion video sequences, like the commercial for example.

=== Director's cut ===
Worms: The Director's Cut (1997) is a sequel to Worms, available only on the Amiga. It is largely built upon the original Amiga game engine with various gameplay enhancement and additions, as well as graphical improvements and fixes. During the development of Worms 2, Andy Davidson wrote this special edition produced exclusively for the Amiga's AGA chipset. Only 5,000 copies were ever sold. It was also the last version released for the Amiga platform, from which the game originated.

=== Remake ===
A remake, also called Worms, was released for the Xbox 360 in 2007. It has since been ported to the PlayStation 3 in April 2009 and on the iPhone on 11 July of the same year.

== Reception ==
Reception

Review scores
Publication	Score
AllGame	4.5/5 (PS)
Amiga Computing	91% (AGA)
Amiga Format	90% (AGA); 85% (CD32)
Amiga Power	60% (AGA)
Computer and Video Games	2/5 (SMD)
Electronic Gaming Monthly	8.625/10 (SAT)
Game Players	94% (SAT)
GamesMaster	64/100 (SMD); 86/100 (SAT)
GameSpot	7.6/10 (PC)
IGN	8/10 (PS)
Mean Machines Sega	79/100 (SMD); 87/100 (SAT)
Micromanía	94/100 (PC)
Next Generation	4/5 (SAT, PS)
PlayStation Official Magazine – UK	7/10 (PS)
Play	92% (PS)
Total!	75/100 (SNES)
Video Games (DE)	70% (SMD); 85% (PS, SAT); 67% (SNES); 5/5 (JAG)
Absolute PlayStation	9/10 (PS)
Coming Soon Magazine	86% (PC)
CU Amiga	94% (AGA); 95% (CD32)
Fun Generation	10/10 (PS, SAT)
Gamer's Zone	4/5 (PC)
Génération 4	93% (PC); 5/5 (MAC)
Joypad	92% (PS)
MacAddict	3/5 (MAC)
MAN!AC	69% (SMD); 76% (PS, SAT); 69% (SNES)
Maximum	3/5 (PC, SAT)
Sega Power	78/100 (SMD); 60/100 (SAT)
Sega Saturn Magazine	90% (SAT)

Worms was a commercial success. By March 1996, its sales had reached almost 250,000 copies, following its release in November 1995. Across all its ports, the game ultimately sold above 5 million units by 2006.

Worms sharply divided critics. Reviewing the Saturn version, Sega Saturn Magazine especially praised Worms's unexpected complexity and the fun of multiplayer mode, and called it "quite simply the most playable game to hit the Saturn so far".

Maximum commented that "Basically, Worms is Lemmings, but it's without the puzzles and with weapons instead." While firmly stating that they found the game dull and unappealing, they acknowledged that it was clearly well liked by gamers.

Next Generation argued while the game resembles Lemmings on a cursory examination, in actuality it is much more similar to Cannon Fodder. Praising the need for both strategy and skill, the multiplayer design, and the randomly generated landscapes, they described Worms as "the kind of game that makes no excuses for its lack of texture-mapped polygons or its minimalist gameplay. Worms is a fun game with an infectious spirit and near endless replay value."

GamePro summarized that "a humorous concept never really pays off in Worms". The reviewer criticized that the tiny size of the characters and their weapons makes them unappealing and even hard to make out. While allowing that the use of the different weapons is interesting at first, he found the action too slow-paced and repetitive to maintain interest.

Mark LeFebvre of Electronic Gaming Monthly (EGM) commented that "Some games have great graphics and control, but Worms doesn't need either because the fun factor is a 10+. With multiplayer ability of up to four people, Worms is one of those games that is so unique, it doesn't fit into any category — except innovative and incredibly addictive." EGM later named it one of their "Top 5 Most Original Games of 1996", and a runner-up for Strategy Game of the Year (behind Dragon Force).

GameSpot criticized the slowness of large multiplayer sessions and the imprecision of the keyboard controls, but, like Sega Saturn Magazine, they lauded the combination of surface simplicity and underlying complexity, summarizing that "Like the board game Othello, Worms takes only a few minutes to learn, but may take a lifetime to master."

Conversely, the Amiga Power review, written in the style of a magazine personality quiz, whilst praising the detail of the animation, described frustrating imbalances especially in relation to the vaunted 16-player multiplayer mode and was critical of the puerility of the game's humour.

Worms was included as one of the titles in the 2010 book 1001 Video Games You Must Play Before You Die. In 1996, GamesMaster ranked Worms 67th on their "Top 100 Games of All Time."

== Sequels ==
Worms is the first game in the Worms series, which has spread to many consoles and platforms as part of its several decade run.
