= Worms 3D =

2003 video game

- Developer: Team17
- Publishers: GameCube, Microsoft Windows, PlayStation 2: EU: Sega; NA: Acclaim Entertainment; Xbox: WW: Sega; Mac OS X: NA: Feral Interactive
- Composer: Bjørn Lynne
- Series: Worms
- Platforms: GameCube, Microsoft Windows, PlayStation 2, Xbox, Mac OS X
- Release: GameCube, Microsoft Windows, PlayStation 2: EU: 31 October 2003; NA: 11 March 2004; Xbox: EU: 31 October 2003; NA: 1 March 2005; Mac OS X: NA: 14 May 2004
- Genres: Artillery, strategy
- Modes: Single-player, multiplayer

Worms 3D is a 2003 3D artillery turn-based tactical video game developed by Team17 and published by Sega, Acclaim Entertainment, and Feral Interactive. It is the sixth installment in the Worms series, and was released for GameCube, Mac OS X, Microsoft Windows, PlayStation 2 and Xbox. Notably, the game was the first in the series to be fully 3D. Additionally, it featured several new weapons, with some weapon operations being substantially different from previous Worms titles.

== Gameplay ==
PC version of Worms 3D featuring fully 3D graphics and familiar elements such as names, health values, and team colours. From top-left clockwise, the user interface comprises a scanner that locates worms and dropped crates; suggested view button, the selected weapon, and the health and team colour of the current worm; wind direction and strength; the status of the teams; and the amount of turn and round time left and the power gauge and vertical aim of the weapon.

The gameplay itself is mostly unchanged from its predecessors, with the exception of the three-dimensional view, which allows the player more freedom, and more possibilities, to complete the task at hand. Modes such as Campaign and Quick Match return from previous versions. The game also features a multiplayer feature, as well as the ability to edit and create teams. The objective of most of the matches is to eliminate the opposing forces' worms, whereas the Campaign mode gives the player sets of specific goals which they need to complete. The Campaign consists of 35 small missions in which the player has to utilise their worms to complete a certain task, like destroy enemy worms, collect a certain crate, or even unique missions, such as having to detonate 16 hidden landmines in a certain time. All of the missions give awards depending on how well the player does. Gold medals usually unlock bonuses as for example maps, challenge missions, information about weapons, or voice banks.

As in Worms 3D's predecessors, the worms continue to fight using a wide range of conventional or droll weapons, including rockets, explosives, firearms, and air strikes, whilst also traversing the island using utilities when those items are available. The entire inventory is derivative of the game's immediate predecessors, but is noticeably simplified and lacks certain previously existed items, including digging tools such as the blowtorch.

In the Challenge missions, the player has to use a weapon/utility to collect targets that add to their timebank, which increases steadily. Getting a gold medal here unlocks maps or locked weapons.

== Development and Release ==
The game was announced by Team17 in July 2002 as Worms 3. The following month, Activision purchased worldwide publishing rights to the title except for the PC version in South Korea, Taiwan and China.

In April 2003, the game was re-announced as Worms 3D. Activision was dropped as publisher for unknown reasons, with Sega instead purchasing the European publication rights, with an option for the company to publish in North America as well. The game was shown off at Sega's booth at E3 2003, featuring two different maps for demonstration. The game was eventually released in Europe at the end of the month.

On 15 January 2004, Acclaim Entertainment announced they had signed a deal with Team17 to publish the game and another upcoming Worms title (later confirmed to be Worms Forts: Under Siege) in North America. and was released on all platforms except for the Xbox on 11 March 2004. Acclaim was due to release the Xbox version later on in the year, however they filed for Chapter 7 Bankruptcy at the end of August 2004, and so left the Xbox version without a publisher until Sega of America announced they had acquired the North American publishing rights to it and Worms Forts: Under Siege in January 2005., releasing on 1 March 2005, almost a year after the other versions.

The Macintosh version was ported and released by Feral Interactive, releasing on 14 May 2004.

== Reception ==
Reception

Aggregate scores
Aggregator	Score
GameRankings	78% (NGC); 73% (XBOX)
Metacritic	74% (PC); 70% (PS2)

Review scores
Publication	Score
Eurogamer	8/10 (GEN)
GameSpot	7.5/10 (NGC); 7.8/10 (PC); 7.5/10 (PS2); 7.1/10 (XBOX)
IGN	7/10 (NGC); 7.5/10 (PC); 7/10 (PS2); 6.8/10 (XBOX)
Macworld	4/5

The Xbox, PC, and PlayStation 2 versions of Worms 3D received mixed reviews, but the GameCube version received fairly positive reviews. Its graphics and sounds were lauded. Despite this, most reviewers criticized the 3D camera system that often places behind the objects in landscape with the worm being hidden in front of those and stiff controlling of the worm. Andy Davidson, the creator of the Worms franchise and who had already left Team17 before returning in 2012, objected to the company's decision to develop a 3D Worms game. He argued that Worms and its mechanics were based on two dimensions only and that adding another dimension broke much of the mechanics. He said that rather than trying to "recreate" Worms itself, he would have preferred to start from scratch and build a 3D game containing the same qualities as the series.

Worms 3D won the Entertainment and Leisure Software Publishers Association silver award, indicating that the game sold at least 100,000 copies in the United Kingdom.
