= 2010 in video games =

Numerous video games were released in 2010. Many awards went to games such as Red Dead Redemption, Assassin's Creed: Brotherhood, Mass Effect 2, God of War III and Super Mario Galaxy 2. Kinect from Microsoft Game Studios for the Xbox 360 was also released this year.

Series with new installments in 2010 include Ace Attorney, Alien vs. Predator, Army of Two, Assassin's Creed, Battlefield, BioShock, Call of Duty, Castlevania, Civilization, Crackdown, Donkey Kong, Darksiders, Dead Rising, Fable, Fallout, God of War, Gran Turismo, Grand Theft Auto, Halo, Just Cause, Kane and Lynch, Lost Planet, Mafia, Mass Effect, Medal of Honor, Mega Man, Metroid, Need for Speed, Pokémon, Prince of Persia, Red Dead, Red Steel, Resident Evil, Skate, StarCraft, Star Wars: The Force Unleashed, Sonic the Hedgehog, Super Mario, Super Monkey Ball, Tom Clancy's H.A.W.X, Tom Clancy's Splinter Cell, Total War, and Trauma Center.

In addition, 2010 saw the introduction of several new properties, including Alan Wake, Darksiders, Deadly Premonition, Heavy Rain, and Metro.

== Legend ==
Video game platforms
DS	Nintendo DS, DSiWare, iQue DS	iOS	iOS, iPhone, iPod, iPadOS, iPad, visionOS, Apple Vision Pro	LIN	Linux, SteamOS
OSX	macOS	PS2	PlayStation 2	PS3	PlayStation 3
PSN	PlayStation Network	PSP	PlayStation Portable	Wii	Wii, WiiWare, Wii Virtual Console
WIN	Windows, all versions Windows 95 and up	XB360	Xbox 360, Xbox 360 Live Arcade		

== Financial performance ==
=== Best-selling family video games ===
The following titles were the top five best-selling family video games worldwide in 2010.

Rank	Title	Platform(s)	Publisher	Sales
1	Wii Sports	Wii	Nintendo	16,600,000
2	New Super Mario Bros. Wii	Wii	Nintendo	11,300,000
2	Wii Sports Resort	Wii	Nintendo	11,300,000
4	Wii Fit Plus	Wii	Nintendo	8,900,000
5	FIFA 11		EA Sports	8,400,000

== Top-rated games ==
=== Critically acclaimed games ===
Metacritic (MC) and GameRankings (GR) are aggregators of video game journalism reviews.

2010 games and expansions scoring at least 90/100 (MC) or 90% (GR)
Game	Publisher	Release Date	Platform	MC score	GR score
Super Mario Galaxy 2	Nintendo	May 23, 2010	Wii	97/100	97.35%
Mass Effect 2	Electronic Arts	January 26, 2010	X360	96/100	95.77%
Red Dead Redemption	Rockstar Games	May 18, 2010	PS3	95/100	94.66%
Red Dead Redemption	Rockstar Games	May 18, 2010	X360	95/100	94.12%
Mass Effect 2	Electronic Arts	January 26, 2010	WIN	94/100	94.52%
StarCraft II: Wings of Liberty	Blizzard Entertainment	July 27, 2010	WIN	93/100	92.44%
Rock Band 3	MTV Games	October 26, 2010	X360	93/100	92.44%
Pac-Man Championship Edition DX	Namco Bandai Games	November 17, 2010	X360	93/100	90.88%
God of War III	Sony Computer Entertainment	March 16, 2010	PS3	92/100	92.07%
Xenoblade Chronicles	Nintendo	June 10, 2010	Wii	92/100	91.74%
Super Street Fighter IV	Capcom	April 27, 2010	PS3	92/100	91.23%
Halo: Reach	Microsoft Game Studios	September 14, 2010	X360	91/100	91.79%
World of Warcraft: Cataclysm	Blizzard Entertainment	December 7, 2010	WIN	90/100	91.45%
Super Street Fighter IV	Capcom	April 27, 2010	X360	91/100	91.39%
Pac-Man Championship Edition DX	Namco Bandai Games	November 17, 2010	PS3	91/100	91.06%
Rock Band 3	MTV Games	October 26, 2010	PS3	91/100	90.94%
Rock Band 3	MTV Games	October 26, 2010	Wii	91/100	90.67%
MLB 10: The Show	Sony Computer Entertainment	March 2, 2010	PS3	91/100	90.53%
Limbo	Microsoft Game Studios	July 21, 2010	X360	90/100	90.68%
Assassin's Creed: Brotherhood	Ubisoft	November 16, 2010	X360	89/100	90.62%
Super Meat Boy	Team Meat	October 20, 2010	X360	90/100	90.51%
Cave Story	Nicalis	March 22, 2010	Wii	89/100	90.31%
Assassin's Creed: Brotherhood	Ubisoft	November 16, 2010	PS3	90/100	89.92%
Civilization V	2K	September 21, 2010	WIN	90/100	89.17%

=== Major awards ===
Category/Organization		28th Golden Joystick Awards October 29, 2010	VGA December 11, 2010		14th Annual Interactive Achievement Awards February 11, 2011			11th Game Developers Choice Awards March 2, 2011	7th British Academy Games Awards March 16, 2011
Game of the Year		Mass Effect 2	Red Dead Redemption		Mass Effect 2			Red Dead Redemption	Mass Effect 2
Independent / Debut (Note: Certain award presentations combine these categories.)		—N/a	Limbo		—N/a			Minecraft	—N/a
Downloadable		Plants vs. Zombies	Costume Quest		—N/a			Minecraft	—N/a
Mobile/Handheld		Pokémon HeartGold and SoulSilver	God of War: Ghost of Sparta					Cut the Rope	
Innovation		—N/a			Heavy Rain			Minecraft	Heavy Rain
Artistic Achievement or Graphics	Animation	—N/a	God of War III		God of War III			Limbo	God of War III
Artistic Achievement or Graphics	Art Direction	—N/a	God of War III		Red Dead Redemption			Limbo	God of War III
Audio	Music	—N/a	Red Dead Redemption		Heavy Rain			Red Dead Redemption	Heavy Rain
Audio	Sound Design	—N/a	—N/a		Limbo			Red Dead Redemption	Battlefield: Bad Company 2
Audio	Soundtrack	Final Fantasy XIII	DJ Hero 2		Rock Band 3			Red Dead Redemption	—N/a
Character or Performance	Actor	—N/a	Neil Patrick Harris as Peter Parker/Spider-Man; Spider-Man: Shattered Dimension	Sgt. Frank Woods; Call of Duty: Black Ops	Rob Wiethoff as John Marston; Red Dead Redemption			—N/a	
Character or Performance	Actress	—N/a	Tricia Helfer as Sarah Kerrigan; StarCraft II: Wings of Liberty	Sgt. Frank Woods; Call of Duty: Black Ops	Rob Wiethoff as John Marston; Red Dead Redemption			—N/a	
Game Direction or Design		—N/a			Red Dead Redemption				Super Mario Galaxy 2
Narrative		—N/a			Mass Effect 2				Heavy Rain
Technical Achievement	Gameplay Engineering	—N/a			Red Dead Redemption			Red Dead Redemption	—N/a
Technical Achievement	Visual Engineering	—N/a			Heavy Rain			Red Dead Redemption	—N/a
Multiplayer/Online		League of Legends	Halo: Reach		StarCraft II: Wings of Liberty			—N/a	Need for Speed: Hot Pursuit
Action/Adventure	Action/Shooter	Call of Duty: Modern Warfare 2	Call of Duty: Black Ops		Red Dead Redemption			—N/a	Assassin's Creed: Brotherhood
Action/Adventure	Adventure	Assassin's Creed II	Assassin's Creed: Brotherhood		Limbo			—N/a	Assassin's Creed: Brotherhood
Casual/Family or Rhythm	Casual	—N/a	Rock Band 3		Angry Birds HD			—N/a	Kinect Sports
Casual/Family or Rhythm	Family	—N/a	Rock Band 3		Dance Central			—N/a	Kinect Sports
Fighting		Street Fighter IV	—N/a		Super Street Fighter IV			—N/a	
Role-Playing		Mass Effect 2						—N/a	
Sports	Individual	FIFA 10	Tiger Woods PGA Tour 11		FIFA 11			—N/a	F1 2010
Sports	Team	FIFA 10	NBA 2K11		FIFA 11			—N/a	F1 2010
Racing		Forza Motorsport 3	Need for Speed: Hot Pursuit					—N/a	
Strategy/Simulation		Plants vs. Zombies	—N/a		StarCraft II: Wings of Liberty			—N/a	Civilization V
Special Award		—N/a	Strongest Heroes of All Time		Hall of Fame	Lifetime Achievement Award	Pioneer Awards	Lifetime Achievement Award	Academy Fellowship
Special Award		—N/a	Master Chief of the Halo series, Samus Aran of the Metroid series, Marcus Fenix of the Gears of War series		Ray Muzyka, Greg Zeschuk	Bing Gordon	Bill Budge	Peter Molyneux	

== Major events ==
Date	Event	Ref.
January 7–10	International Consumer Electronics Show 2010 was held in Las Vegas, Nevada, USA.	
February 11–14	Microsoft X10 held in San Francisco.	
February 24–27	Nintendo World Summit held in San Francisco.	
March 9–13	Game Developers Conference 2010 held in San Francisco, CA.	
March 26–28	First PAX East Coast at the John B. Hynes Veterans Memorial Convention Center in Boston, MA.	
April 15	Xbox Live for original Xbox console and games discontinued.	
April 20–23	Captivate, Capcom's annual tradeshow was held in Honolulu, Hawaii.	
May 4–7	The Humble Indie Bundle, an experiment into indie, charitable, cross-platform, DRM-free digital game distribution, is first released to great success.	
May 30	Esports organization FaZe Clan is founded.	
June 15–17	E3 2010 is held at the Los Angeles Convention Center.	
June 17–19	OnLive released.	
August 12–15	QuakeCon was held in the Hotel Hilton Anatole, in Dallas, Texas, USA.	
August 16–18	Game Developers Conference was held in Europe in Cologne.	
August 18–22	Gamescom 2010 was held at Cologne, Germany.	
September 3–5	Penny Arcade Expo 2010 was held at Washington State Convention Center in Seattle.	
September 15–21	PlayStation Move was launched in North America, Europe and various Asian countries.	
September 16–19	Tokyo Game Show 2010 was held at Makuhari Messe in Japan.	
September 30–October 3	The 2010 World Cyber Games take place.	
October 22–23	BlizzCon 2010 was held at Anaheim Convention Center in Anaheim, California.	
November 4–7	Microsoft's Kinect launched worldwide, starting in North America.	
December 11	The 2010 Spike Video Game Awards were held.	

== Notable deaths ==
- February 24 - Mark Beaumont, 54, COO of Capcom
- February 1 - Tomi Pierce, 56, Writer of The Last Express
- April 29 - Alexander Shafto "Sandy" Douglas, 88, Computer Scientist and creator of the first graphical computer game OXO
- May 29 – Dennis Hopper, 74, actor (King Koopa in Super Mario Bros., Mr. Beautiful in Hell: A Cyberpunk Thriller, Walter Pensky in Black Dahlia, Steve Scott in Grand Theft Auto: Vice City, and George Struggs in Deadly Creatures)
- June 26 - Jonathan Smith, 57, British game developer, notable for developing many titles for the ZX Spectrum including Cobra
- September 7 – Glenn Shadix, 58, actor (Demolition Man, The Nightmare Before Christmas: Oogie's Revenge, Kingdom Hearts)
- October 29 – Takeshi Shudo, 61, scriptwriter and creator of Lugia for Pokémon
- December 9 - John Makepeace Bennett, 89, Computer Scientist who worked on Nimrod, one of the first computers capable of playing games
- December 29 - Brigitte Burdine, 48, Casting Director who worked on God of War II

== Hardware releases ==
This is a list of all the game hardware released in 2010. This year saw the release of Sony's PlayStation Move and Microsoft's Kinect, which are Motion controller peripherals made to compete with Nintendo's Wii. In addition, Nintendo also released the Wii Remote Plus, which was a Wii Remote with a built-in MotionPlus.

Two consoles revisions were also released this year, the Nintendo DSi XL (which initially launched in Japan last year) and the Xbox 360 S.

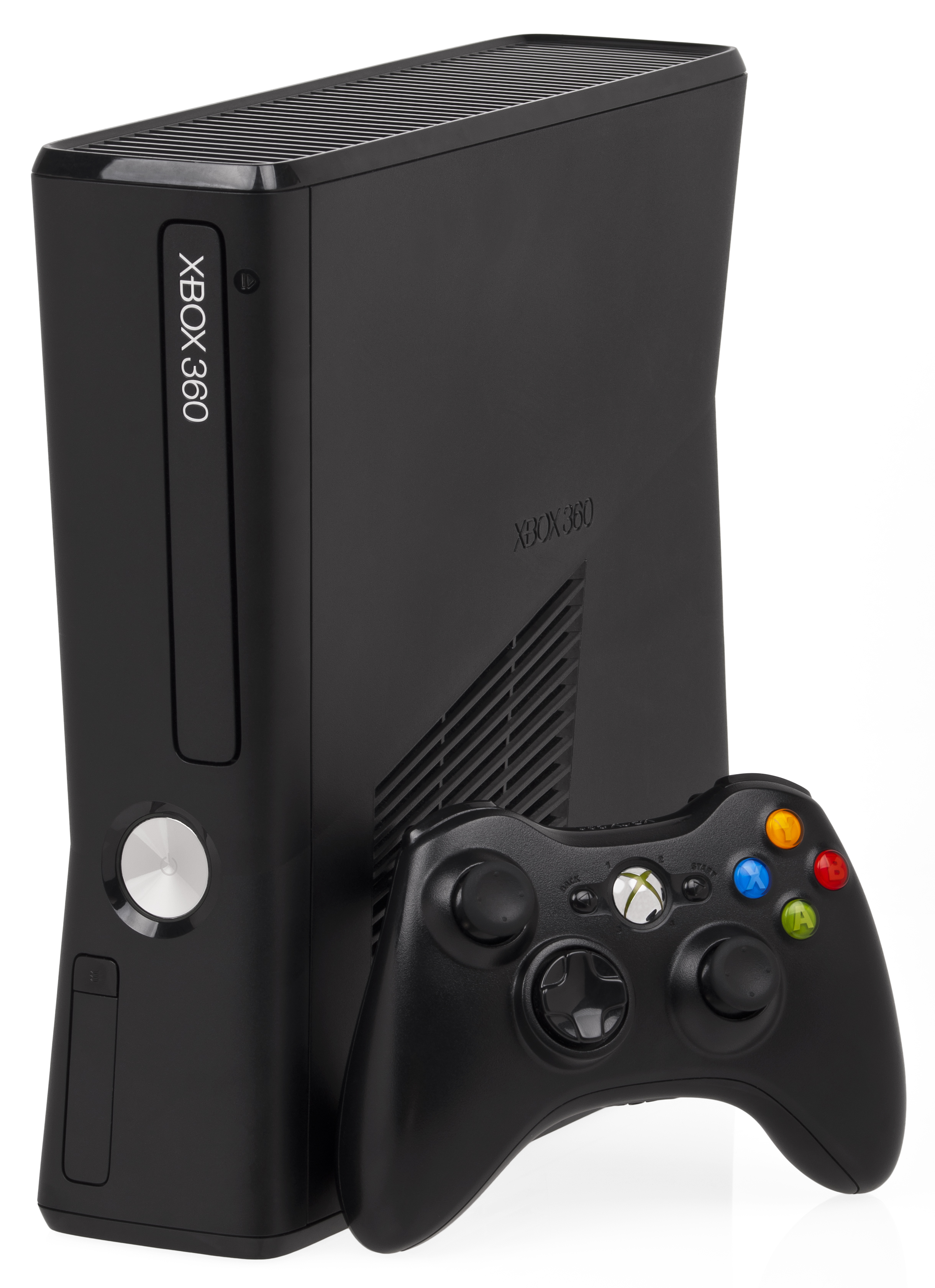
Xbox 360 S

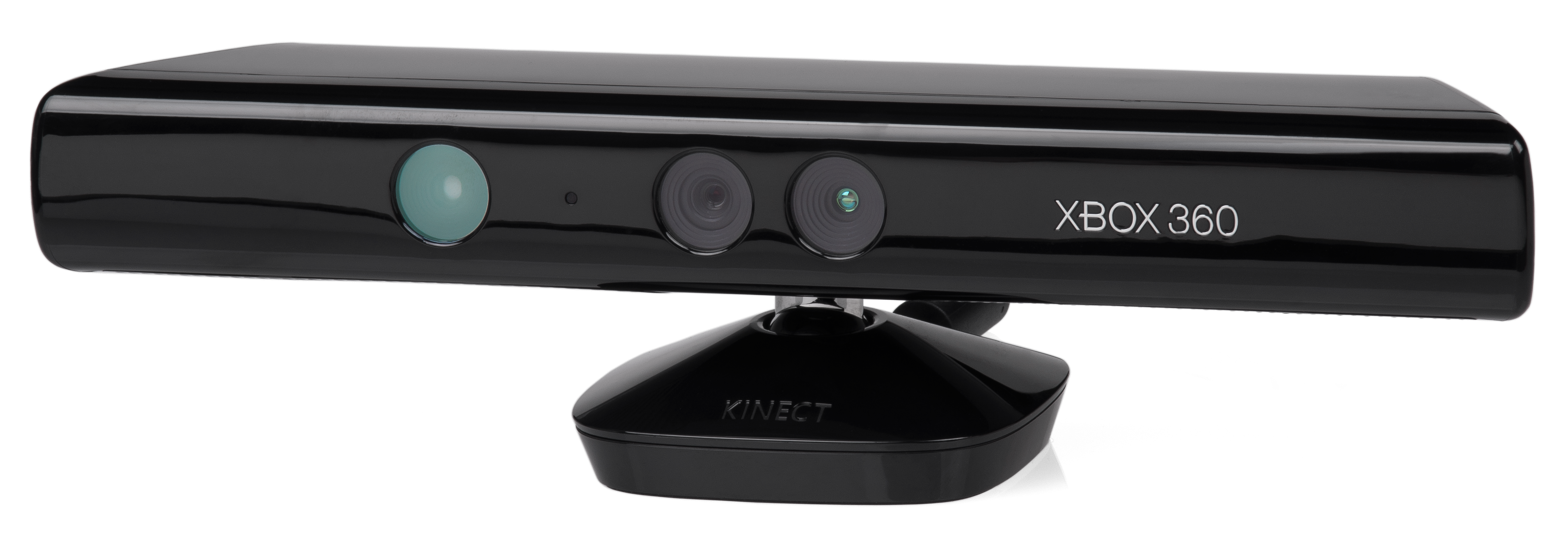
Kinect

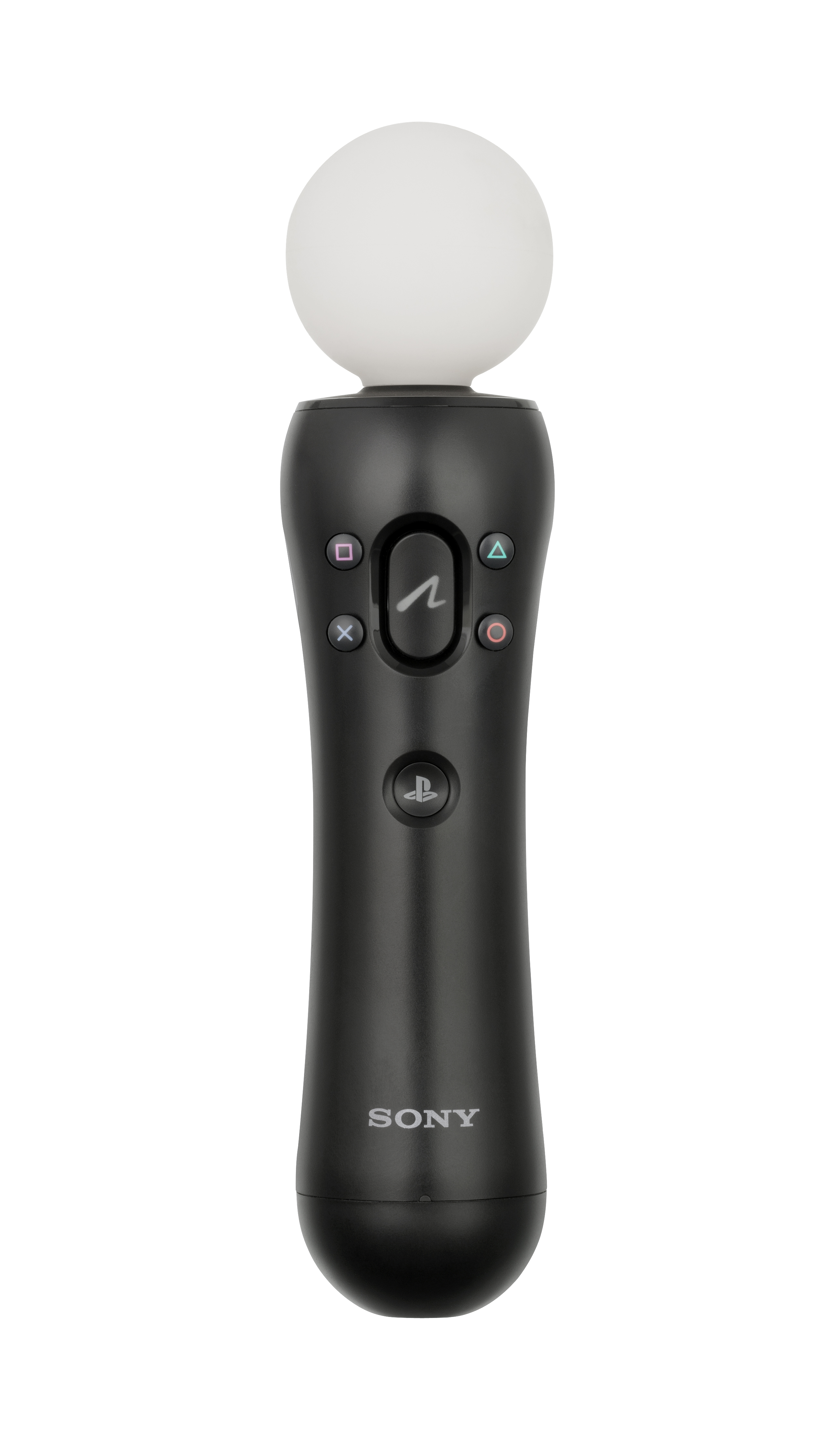
PlayStation Move

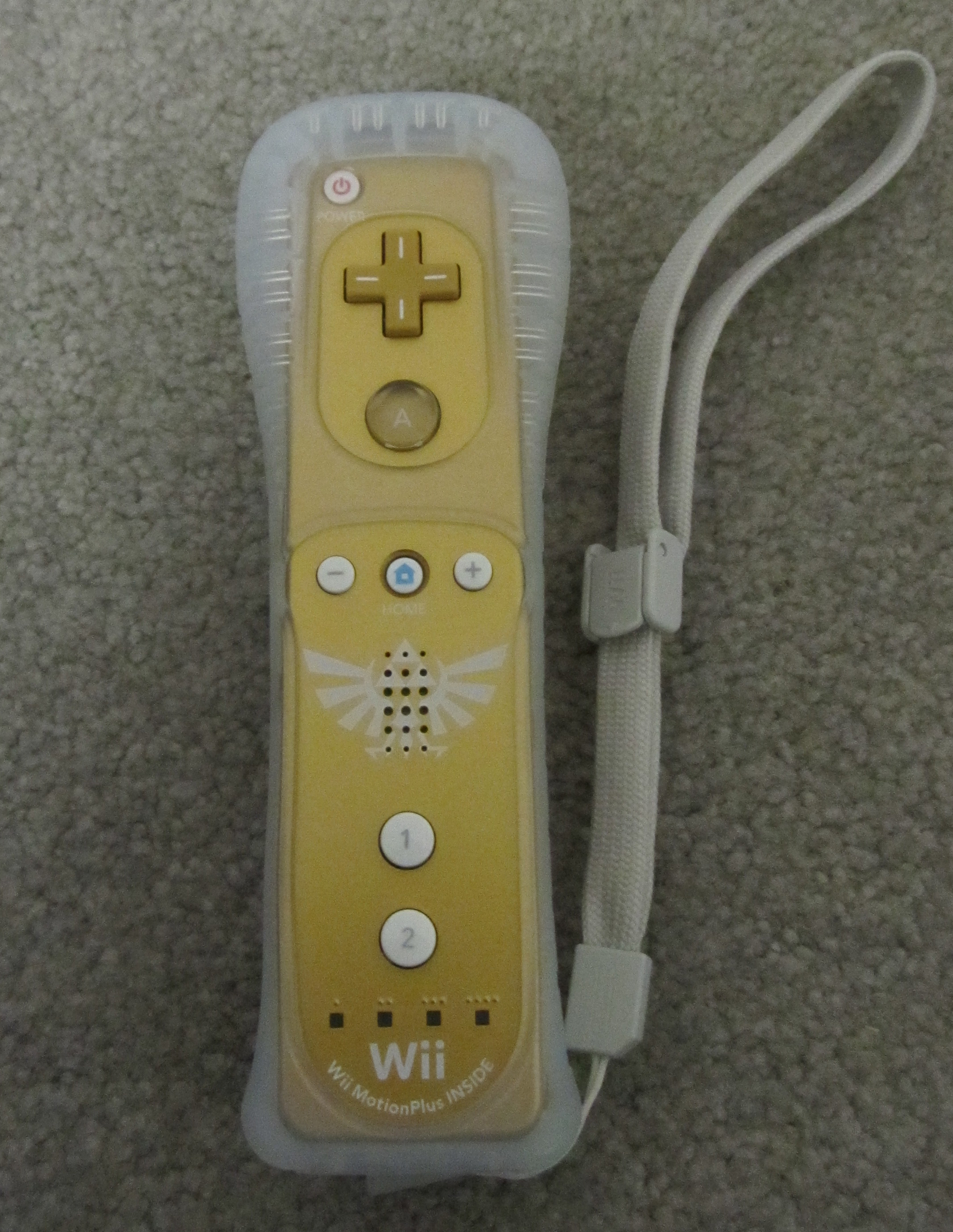
Wii Remote Plus

Date	Console	Ref.
March 5	Nintendo DSi XL^{EU}	
March 28	Nintendo DSi XL^{NA}	
April 15	Nintendo DSi XL^{AU}	
June 18	Xbox 360 S^{NA}	
July 1	Xbox 360 S^{AU}	
July 8	Xbox 360 S^{NZ}	
July 16	Xbox 360 S^{EU}	
September 15	PlayStation Move^{EU}	
September 16	PlayStation Move^{AU/NZ}	
September 17	PlayStation Move^{UK}	
September 19	PlayStation Move^{NA}	
October 21	PlayStation Move^{JP}	
October 28	Wii Remote Plus^{AU}	
November 4	Kinect^{NA}	
November 5	Wii Remote Plus^{EU}	
November 7	Wii Remote Plus^{NA}	
November 10	Kinect^{EU}	
November 11	Wii Remote Plus^{JP}	
November 14	Kinect^{COL}	
November 18	Kinect^{AU}	
November 20	Kinect^{JP}	

== Games released in 2010 ==
Release date	Title	Platform	Genre	Ref.
January 5	Bayonetta	PS3, X360	Action-adventure, Hack and slash	
January 5	Darksiders	WIN, PS3, X360	Action-adventure, Hack and slash	
January 5	Divinity II: Ego Draconis	WIN, X360	Action RPG	
January 5	Fable II: Game of the Year Edition	X360	Action RPG	
January 6	Matt Hazard: Blood Bath and Beyond	X360	Shoot 'em up	
January 7	Assassin's Creed II: Discovery	iOS	Action-adventure	
January 7	Matt Hazard: Blood Bath and Beyond	PSN	Shoot 'em up	
January 11	Chronos Twins DX	Wii	Action-adventure	
January 11	Phoenix Wright: Ace Attorney (Episodes 1–4)	Wii	Visual novel, Adventure	
January 11	VVVVVV	WIN	Puzzle-platformer	
January 12	Army of Two: The 40th Day	PS3, X360, PSP	TPS	
January 12	Daniel X: The Ultimate Power	DS	Platformer	
January 12	Sands of Destruction	DS		
January 12	The Sky Crawlers: Innocent Aces	Wii		
January 12	Vancouver 2010	WIN, X360, PS3		
January 12	Walk It Out!	Wii		
January 15	Secret Files 2: Puritas Cordis	WIN		
January 17	Grand Theft Auto: Chinatown Wars Mobile	iOS		
January 18	Chronos Twins DX	DS		
January 18	Glory of Heracles	DS		
January 18	Starship Defense	DS		
January 19	Bejeweled Twist	DS		
January 19	Dark Void	WIN, X360, PS3		
January 19	Silent Hill: Shattered Memories	PS2, PSP		
January 20	Vandal Hearts: Flames of Judgment	X360		
January 21	Vandal Hearts: Flames of Judgment	PS3		
January 25	Playmobil Knights	DS		
January 26	MAG	PS3		
January 26	Mass Effect 2	WIN, X360, PS3		
January 26	No More Heroes 2: Desperate Struggle	Wii		
January 26	Shadow of Destiny	PSP		
January 26	Tatsunoko vs. Capcom: Ultimate All-Stars	Wii		
January 28	Thexder Neo	PS3		
February 1	Global Agenda	WIN		
February 1	True Swing Golf	DS		
February 2	S.T.A.L.K.E.R.: Call of Pripyat	WIN		
February 2	The Sims 3: High-End Loft Stuff	WIN, OSX		
February 2	Star Trek Online	WIN		
February 2	White Knight Chronicles	PS3		
February 4	Silent Line: Armored Core	PSP		
February 5	Space Miner: Space Ore Bust	iOS		
February 8	Blaster Master: Overdrive	Wii		
February 8	Fieldrunners	DS		
February 8	Star Ocean: The Last Hope International	PS3		
February 9	BioShock 2	WIN, X360, PS3		
February 9	Dante's Inferno	PS3, X360		
February 9	Scene It? Twilight	DS		
February 9	Shiren the Wanderer	Wii		
February 9	Super Monkey Ball: Step & Roll	Wii		
February 9	World of Outlaws: Sprint Cars	X360, WIN		
February 10	Stargate Resistance	WIN		
February 11	Dragon Ball: Origins 2	DS		
February 11	Percy Jackson & the Olympians: The Lightning Thief	DS		
February 11	Spaceball Revolution	PSP		
February 12	World Cup of Pool	DS		
February 12	Zorro: Quest for Justice	DS		
February 15	Art of Balance	Wii		
February 15	Phoenix Wright: Ace Attorney − Justice for All	Wii		
February 15	Spaceball Revolution	DS		
February 16	Ace Attorney Investigations: Miles Edgeworth	DS		
February 16	Aliens vs. Predator	WIN, X360, PS3		
February 16	Crime Scene	DS		
February 16	Dynasty Warriors: Strikeforce	X360, PS3, PSP		
February 16	Ragnarok DS	DS		
February 16	SOCOM U.S. Navy SEALs: Fireteam Bravo 3	PSP		
February 16	Tropico 3	X360		
February 17	Deadly Premonition	X360		
February 19	Data East Arcade Classics	Wii		
February 19	NecroVisioN: Lost Company	WIN		
February 22	Aura-Aura Climber	DS		
February 22	Endless Ocean 2: Adventures of the Deep	Wii		
February 22	Flight Control	DS		
February 22	Risen	X360		
February 23	Arsenal of Democracy	WIN		
February 23	Heavy Rain	PS3		
February 23	Last Rebellion	PS3		
February 23	M.U.D. TV	WIN		
February 23	Metal Slug XX	PSP		
February 23	Napoleon: Total War	WIN		
February 23	Sonic & Sega All-Stars Racing	PS3, X360, DS, Wii, WIN		
February 24	echoshift	PSP		
February 24	Greed Corp	X360, PSN		
February 24	Tilt to Live	iOS		
March 1	Dante's Inferno	PSP		
March 1	Mega Man 10	Wii		
March 2	Alice in Wonderland	DS, Wii		
March 2	Battle of Giants: Mutant Insects	DS		
March 2	Battlefield: Bad Company 2	WIN, X360, PS3		
March 2	Deca Sports DS	DS		
March 2	Lips: Party Classics	X360		
March 2	Lunar: Silver Star Harmony	PSP		
March 2	MLB 10: The Show	PS2, PS3, PSP		
March 2	MLB 2K10	WIN, X360, PS2, PS3, Wii, PSP		
March 2	Rayman 2	iOS		
March 2	Silent Hunter V: Battle of the Atlantic	WIN		
March 2	Sonic Classic Collection	DS		
March 2	SpongeBob's Boating Bash	DS, Wii		
March 2	Supreme Commander 2	WIN		
March 4	Bit Pilot	iOS		
March 8	Max & the Magic Marker	Wii		
March 9	Assassin's Creed II	WIN		
March 9	BlazBlue: Calamity Trigger Portable	PSP		
March 9	Calling	Wii		
March 9	The Eye of Judgment: Legends	PSP		
March 9	Final Fantasy XIII	PS3, X360		
March 9	Resident Evil 5: Gold Edition	PS3		
March 9	Rise of Prussia	WIN		
March 9	Yakuza 3	PS3		
March 10	Street Fighter IV	iOS		
March 11	Mega Man 10	PSN		
March 11	Warhammer 40,000: Dawn of War II – Chaos Rising	WIN		
March 14	Pokémon HeartGold and SoulSilver (North America)	DS		
March 15	Rage of the Gladiator	Wii		
March 16	Command & Conquer 4: Tiberian Twilight	WIN		
March 16	Dragon Age: Origins – Awakening	WIN, X360, PS3		
March 16	Fragile Dreams: Farewell Ruins of the Moon	Wii		
March 16	God of War III	PS3		
March 16	Infinite Space	DS		
March 16	Metro 2033	WIN, X360		
March 16	Resonance of Fate	X360, PS3		
March 16	Sam & Max: Beyond Time and Space	Wii		
March 16	Sonny with a Chance	DS		
March 16	Supreme Commander 2	X360		
March 17	Perfect Dark	X360		
March 21	Zhu Zhu Pets	DS		
March 22	Cave Story	Wii		
March 23	Bakugan Battle Brawlers: Battle Trainer	DS		
March 23	Disney Stitch Jam	DS		
March 23	How to Train Your Dragon	X360, DS, PS3, Wii		
March 23	Just Cause 2	WIN, X360, PS3		
March 23	MotoGP 09/10	X360, PS3		
March 23	Red Steel 2	Wii		
March 23	Rooms: The Main Building	Wii		
March 23	The Settlers 7: Paths to a Kingdom	WIN		
March 23	Shin Megami Tensei: Strange Journey	DS		
March 24	Ski-Doo: Snowmobile Challenge	X360		
March 25	Flotilla	X360		
March 25	Section 8	PS3		
March 25	Wakeboarding HD	PS3		
March 26	Anarchy: Rush Hour	PS3		
March 26	Wonderful Everyday	WIN		
March 28	WarioWare D.I.Y.	DS		
March 29	Flotilla	WIN		
March 29	Zenonia 2	iOS		
March 30	Dead or Alive Paradise	PSP		
March 30	Mimana Iyar Chronicle	PSP		
March 30	Prison Break: The Conspiracy	WIN, X360, PS3		
March 30	Sakura Wars: So Long, My Love	PS2, Wii		
March 30	Samurai Shodown: Edge of Destiny	X360		
March 31	Mega Man 10	X360		
April 1	Super Monkey Ball 2: Sakura Edition	iOS		
April 2	Again	DS		
April 2	Star Wars: Cantina	iOS		
April 5	Mr. Driller: Drill Till You Drop	DS		
April 8	Lead and Gold: Gangs of the Wild West	WIN		
April 10	Chaos Rings	iOS		
April 10	Espgaluda II	iOS		
April 12	Dark Void Zero	iOS, WIN		
April 12	Gangstar 2: Kings of L.A.	DS		
April 13	Grand Theft Auto: Episodes from Liberty City	PS3, WIN		
April 13	Tom Clancy's Splinter Cell: Conviction	X360		
April 14	Final Fight: Double Impact	X360		
April 15	Sam & Max: The Devil's Playhouse Episode 1: The Penal Zone	WIN, OSX, PS3		
April 20	Monster Hunter Tri	Wii		
April 22	Homerun Hitters	PSN		
April 23	Sherlock Holmes vs. Jack the Ripper	X360		
April 26	Harvest Moon: Hero of Leaf Valley	PSP		
April 26	System Flaw	DS		
April 27	2010 FIFA World Cup South Africa	PS3, X360, Wii, PSP, iOS		
April 27	Dead to Rights: Retribution	X360, PS3		
April 27	Fruit Ninja	iOS		
April 27	Nier	X360, PS3		
April 27	PixelJunk Monsters Deluxe	PSP		
April 27	Record of Agarest War	PS3, X360		
April 27	Super Street Fighter IV	PS3, X360		
April 27	Tom Clancy's Splinter Cell: Conviction	WIN		
April 28	Tecmo Bowl Throwback	X360		
April 29	Kick-Ass: The Game	PSN		
May 1	Transformice	WIN		
May 4	Dementium II	DS		
May 4	Fat Princess: Fistful of Cake	PSP		
May 4	Iron Man 2	PS3, PSP, X360, Wii, DS		
May 4	Lead and Gold: Gangs of the Wild West	PS3		
May 4	What Did I Do To Deserve This My Lord? 2	PSP		
May 7	Biozone	WIN		
May 10	Earthworm Jim	DS		
May 10	Phoenix Wright: Ace Attorney − Trials and Tribulations	Wii		
May 11	3D Dot Game Heroes	PS3		
May 11	Lost Planet 2	X360, PS3		
May 11	Naruto Shippuden: Ultimate Ninja Heroes 3	PSP		
May 11	Skate 3	PS3, X360		
May 11	World of Outlaws: Sprint Cars	PSN		
May 12	Eschalon: Book II	WIN		
May 12	Heroes of Newerth	WIN, OSX, LIN		
May 12	Rocket Knight	WIN, X360		
May 12	Things on Wheels	X360		
May 17	Bit.Trip Runner	Wii		
May 17	Frogger Returns	DS		
May 18	Alan Wake	X360		
May 18	Attack of the Movies 3D	Wii, X360		
May 18	Blue Dragon: Awakened Shadow	DS		
May 18	Prince of Persia: The Forgotten Sands	DS, Wii, PSP, PS3, X360		
May 18	Red Dead Redemption	X360, PS3		
May 18	Rocket Knight	PSN		
May 18	Runaway: A Twist of Fate	WIN		
May 18	Shrek Forever After	iOS, DS, PS3, Wii, WIN, X360		
May 18	Split Second: Velocity	WIN, X360, PS3		
May 18	Trauma Team	Wii		
May 19	Aqua – Naval Warfare	X360		
May 19	Metal Slug XX	X360		
May 21	Gray Matter	WIN		
May 23	Super Mario Galaxy 2	Wii		
May 24	Phoenix Wright: Ace Attorney	iOS		
May 24	Phoenix Wright: Ace Attorney (Episode 5)	Wii		
May 24	World Poker Tour: Texas Hold 'Em	DS		
May 25	Blur	WIN, X360, PS3		
May 25	Club Penguin: Elite Penguin Force: Herbert's Revenge	DS		
May 25	Colour Cross	DS		
May 25	ModNation Racers	PS3, PSP		
May 25	Pirates Plund-Arrr	Wii		
May 25	Tetris Party Deluxe	Wii		
May 25	UFC 2010	X360, PS3		
May 26	Ben 10 Alien Force: The Rise of Hex	X360		
May 26	Eschalon: Book II	OSX, LIN		
May 31	Ben 10 Alien Force: The Rise of Hex	Wii		
May 31	Little Things	iOS		
May 31	X-Scape	DS		
June 1	Alpha Protocol	WIN, X360, PS3		
June 1	Backbreaker	X360, PS3		
June 1	Planet Minigolf	PSN		
June 1	The Sims 3: Ambitions	WIN		
June 1	Syphon Filter: Logan's Shadow	PS2		
June 1	Tecmo Bowl Throwback	PSN		
June 1	Vectorman	WIN		
June 2	Hector: Badge of Carnage (Episode 1)	iOS		
June 2	Hexyz Force	PSP		
June 2	Snoopy Flying Ace	X360		
June 4	FIFA Online	WIN		
June 4	Happy Wheels	WIN		
June 8	Cubixx	PSP		
June 8	Disgaea Infinite	PSP		
June 8	Green Day: Rock Band	X360, PS3, Wii		
June 8	Joe Danger	PS3		
June 8	Mega Man Zero Collection	DS		
June 8	Metal Gear Solid: Peace Walker	PSP		
June 8	Tiger Woods PGA Tour 11	X360, PS3, Wii		
June 9	NeoGeo Battle Coliseum	X360		
June 10	River City Soccer Hooligans	DS		
June 12	Prince of Persia: The Forgotten Sands	WIN		
June 14	A Kappa's Trail	DS		
June 14	Legend of Kay	DS		
June 15	100 Classic Books	DS		
June 15	Dance on Broadway	Wii		
June 15	Totally Spies!: Revenge of the Undercover	PS3, X360, Wii, PSP, DS		
June 15	Toy Story 3: The Video Game	PS3, X360, Wii, PSP, DS, WIN		
June 19	Bar Oasis	iOS		
June 20	Young Thor	PSP		
June 21	Art Style: Rotozoa	Wii		
June 21	Legendary Wars: T-Rex Rumble	DS		
June 22	Transformers: Cybertron Adventures	Wii		
June 22	Transformers: War for Cybertron	WIN, X360, PS3, Wii, DS		
June 24	Dream Chronicles: The Book of Air	WIN		
June 25	TNA Impact!: Cross the Line	DS, PSP		
June 26	Monkey Island 2 Special Edition: LeChuck's Revenge	iOS		
June 27	Sin and Punishment: Star Successor	Wii		
June 28	Despicable Me: Minion Mania	iOS		
June 28	Jett Rocket	Wii		
June 28	Maestro! Jump in Music	DS		
June 29	10 Minute Solution	Wii		
June 29	APB All Points Bulletin	WIN		
June 29	Deathsmiles	X360		
June 29	The Last Airbender	DS, Wii		
June 29	Lego Harry Potter: Years 1-4	WIN, PS3, Wii, PSP, X360, DS		
June 29	Nancy Drew: Trail of the Twister	WIN, OSX		
June 29	Naughty Bear	X360, PS3		
June 29	Ninety-Nine Nights II	X360		
June 29	Runaway: A Twist of Fate	DS		
June 29	Singularity	WIN, X360, PS3		
June 29	Sniper: Ghost Warrior	WIN, X360		
June 29	Trinity Universe	PS3		
July 2	Archetype	iOS		
July 3	Moto Racer DS	DS		
July 6	Crackdown 2	X360		
July 6	Despicable Me: Minion Mayhem	DS		
July 6	Persona 3	PSP		
July 6	Tournament of Legends	Wii		
July 7	Blacklight: Tango Down	X360		
July 8	Mini Ninjas	OSX		
July 11	Dragon Quest IX: Sentinels of the Starry Skies	DS		
July 12	StarDunk	iOS		
July 13	DeathSpank	PSN		
July 13	NCAA Football 11	PS2, PS3, X360		
July 13	The Sorcerer's Apprentice	DS, PS3, Wii, X360		
July 14	Blacklight: Tango Down	WIN		
July 14	Deadliest Warrior: The Game	X360		
July 14	DeathSpank	X360		
July 19	Alien Swarm	WIN		
July 19	Furry Legends	Wii		
July 20	Arc Rise Fantasia	Wii		
July 20	Gravity Crash	PSP		
July 21	Castlevania Puzzle: Encore of the Night	iOS		
July 21	Limbo	X360		
July 24	Doctor Who: The Adventure Games – City of the Daleks	WIN		
July 24	Malicious	PSN		
July 26	Crystal Monsters	DS		
July 27	BlazBlue: Continuum Shift	PS3, X360		
July 27	Clash of the Titans	PS3, X360		
July 27	Galaxy Racers	DS		
July 27	Need for Speed: World	WIN		
July 27	StarCraft II: Wings of Liberty	WIN, OSX		
July 28	Hydro Thunder Hurricane	X360		
July 29	Hero of Sparta II	iOS		
July 29	SimCity Deluxe	iOS		
August 2	BlayzBloo: Super Melee Brawlers Battle Royale	DS		
August 3	Crimson Gem Saga	iOS		
August 4	Castlevania: Harmony of Despair	X360		
August 10	Crash Team Racing	PSN		
August 10	Galactic Taz Ball	DS		
August 10	Madden NFL 11	PS2, PS3, PSP, Wii, X360		
August 10	Scott Pilgrim vs. the World: The Game	PSN		
August 11	Monday Night Combat	X360		
August 13	Victoria 2	WIN		
August 16	Monsteca Corral	Wii		
August 17	Kane & Lynch 2: Dog Days	WIN, X360, PS3		
August 17	Ys Seven	PSP		
August 18	Lara Croft and the Guardian of Light	X360		
August 24	Elemental: War of Magic	WIN		
August 24	Grease	DS, Wii		
August 24	Ivy the Kiwi?	Wii, DS		
August 24	Mafia II	WIN, X360, PS3		
August 24	Nancy Drew: Secrets Can Kill Remastered	WIN, OSX		
August 25	Scott Pilgrim vs. the World: The Game	X360		
August 26	Phantasy Star II	iOS		
August 26	Worms Reloaded	WIN, OSX		
August 31	Ace Combat: Joint Assault	PSP		
August 31	Camp Rock: The Final Jam	DS		
August 31	Castle Crashers	PS3		
August 31	Metroid: Other M	Wii		
August 31	Valkyria Chronicles II	PSP		
September 1	Alien Breed Evolution	PSN		
September 5	The Next Star 3	WIN, X360, PS2, PS3, Wii, PSP		
September 7	Batman: The Brave and the Bold	Wii, DS		
September 7	Kingdom Hearts Birth by Sleep	PSP		
September 7	NHL 11	PS3, X360		
September 7	NHL Slapshot	Wii		
September 7	Spider-Man: Shattered Dimensions	DS, PS3, Wii, X360		
September 7	Tom Clancy's H.A.W.X 2	PS3, X360		
September 8	Amnesia: The Dark Descent	WIN, OSX, LIN		
September 8	Plants vs. Zombies	X360		
September 10	Ninety-Nine Nights II	X360		
September 10	Recettear: An Item Shop's Tale	WIN		
September 12	Professor Layton and the Unwound Future	DS		
September 14	Fancy Nancy: Tea Party Time	DS		
September 14	Halo: Reach	X360		
September 14	The Lord of the Rings: Aragorn's Quest	PS3, PS2, PSP, Wii, DS		
September 14	Phantasy Star Portable 2	PSP		
September 14	Phineas and Ferb: Ride Again	DS, Wii		
September 14	Scooby-Doo! And the Spooky Swamp	PS2, Wii, DS		
September 14	Space Invaders Infinity Gene	PS3		
September 14	UFC 2010	PSP		
September 15	Gladiator Begins	PSP		
September 15	Hypership Out of Control	X360		
September 15	Space Invaders Infinity Gene	X360		
September 17	R.U.S.E.	X360, PS3, WIN		
September 18	EyePet: Move Edition	PS3		
September 18	Pokémon Black and White (Japan)	DS		
September 20	Cladun: This is an RPG	PSP		
September 21	Civilization V	WIN		
September 21	Club Penguin: Game Day!	Wii		
September 21	DeathSpank: Thongs of Virtue	PSN		
September 21	Disney Fairies: Tinker Bell and the Great Fairy Rescue	DS		
September 21	Etrian Odyssey III: The Drowned City	DS		
September 21	New Carnival Games	DS, Wii		
September 22	Alien Breed 2: Assault	X360, WIN		
September 22	Blade Kitten	PSN, WIN, X360		
September 22	DeathSpank: Thongs of Virtue	X360		
September 22	F1 2010	WIN, X360, PS3		
September 23	Darksiders	WIN		
September 24	Lost Horizon	WIN		
September 24	NHL 2K11	Wii		
September 27	Samurai Warriors 3	Wii		
September 28	Atelier Rorona: The Alchemist of Arland	PS3		
September 28	Dead Rising 2	WIN, PS3, X360		
September 28	FIFA 11	WIN, X360, Wii, DS, PS2, PS3, PSP		
September 28	Front Mission Evolved	WIN, X360, PS3		
September 28	Guitar Hero: Warriors of Rock	PS3, Wii, X360		
September 28	Lara Croft and the Guardian of Light	PSN, WIN		
September 28	MorphX	X360		
September 28	MySims SkyHeroes	DS, PS3, Wii, X360		
September 28	Quantum Theory	PS3, X360		
September 29	Hydrophobia	X360		
September 30	Bit.Trip Beat	iOS		
September 30	Final Fantasy XIV	WIN		
September 30	Ninja Chicken: Shoot 'Em Up	iOS		
September 30	World of Tanks	WIN		
October 1	EyePet	PSP		
October 3	Wii Party	Wii		
October 4	Final Fantasy: The 4 Heroes of Light	DS		
October 4	Modern Combat 2: Black Pegasus	iOS		
October 4	Pokémon Ranger: Guardian Signs	DS		
October 4	Shantae: Risky's Revenge	DS		
October 5	Ben 10 Ultimate Alien: Cosmic Destruction	X360, Wii, DS, PS2, PS3, PSP		
October 5	Castlevania: Lords of Shadow	X360, PS3		
October 5	Deadliest Warrior: The Game	PSN		
October 5	Def Jam Rapstar	X360, PS3, Wii		
October 5	Enslaved: Odyssey to the West	X360, PS3		
October 5	NBA 2K11	WIN, PS3, X360, PSP, PS2, Wii, iOS		
October 5	NBA Jam	Wii		
October 5	Pro Evolution Soccer 2011	WIN, X360, Wii, DS, PS2, PS3		
October 6	Comic Jumper: The Adventures of Captain Smiley	X360		
October 6	Cut the Rope	iOS		
October 6	ProtoGalaxy	WIN		
October 7	Kingdom Hearts Re:coded	DS		
October 7	Sonic the Hedgehog 4: Episode 1	iOS		
October 11	Sonic the Hedgehog 4: Episode 1	Wii		
October 12	Alundra	PSN		
October 12	Arc the Lad	PSN		
October 12	Arcania: Gothic 4	WIN, X360		
October 12	Dead Space Ignition	PSN, X360		
October 12	Invizimals	PSP		
October 12	Just Dance 2	Wii		
October 12	Lost Planet 2	WIN		
October 12	Lucha Libre AAA: Héroes del Ring	PS3, X360		
October 12	Lufia: Curse of the Sinistrals	DS		
October 12	Medal of Honor	WIN, PS3, X360		
October 12	Sengoku Basara: Samurai Heroes	PS3, Wii		
October 12	Sonic the Hedgehog 4: Episode 1	PSN		
October 12	Super Scribblenauts	DS		
October 13	Sonic the Hedgehog 4: Episode 1	X360		
October 13	Vindictus	WIN		
October 14	DJ Max Portable 3	PSP		
October 17	Kirby's Epic Yarn	Wii		
October 19	Age of Hammer Wars	PS3, PSP		
October 19	Bakugan: Defenders of the Core	DS, PS3, PSP, Wii, X360		
October 19	Blazing Souls	PSP		
October 19	DJ Hero 2	X360, PS3, Wii		
October 19	DJ Max Portable 3	PSN		
October 19	Dragon Ball Z: Tenkaichi Tag Team	PSP		
October 19	EA Sports MMA	PS3, X360		
October 19	Fallout: New Vegas	PS3, X360, WIN		
October 19	Flip's Twisted World	Wii		
October 19	Nancy Drew: Shadow at the Water's Edge	WIN, OSX		
October 19	Naruto Shippuden: Ultimate Ninja Storm 2	PS3, X360		
October 19	Rock of the Dead	X360, PS3, Wii		
October 19	Saw II: Flesh & Blood	PS3, X360		
October 19	The Shoot	PS3		
October 19	Vanquish	PS3, X360		
October 20	Super Meat Boy	X360		
October 21	Angry Birds Seasons	iOS		
October 24	Shaun White Skateboarding	PS3, Wii, WIN, X360		
October 25	Bit.Trip Fate	Wii		
October 25	Dragon Age: Origins – Ultimate Edition	PS3, WIN, X360		
October 26	Backyard Sports: Rookie Rush	DS, Wii, WIN, X360		
October 26	Blacklight: Tango Down	PSN		
October 26	Crafting Mama	DS		
October 26	DeathSpank	WIN		
October 26	Deca Sports 3	Wii		
October 26	Disney Channel All Star Party	Wii		
October 26	Fable III	X360		
October 26	Hasbro Family Game Night 3	PS3, Wii, X360		
October 26	Lego Universe	WIN		
October 26	Red Dead Redemption: Undead Nightmare	PS3, X360		
October 26	Rock Band 3	PS3, X360, Wii, DS		
October 26	The Sims 3	PS3, X360, Wii, DS		
October 26	The Sims 3: Late Night	WIN, OSX		
October 26	Star Wars: The Force Unleashed II	PS3, X360, WIN, Wii, DS		
October 26	WWE SmackDown vs Raw 2011	PS3, X360, PSP, PS2, Wii		
October 26	Yu-Gi-Oh! 5D's Tag Force 5	PSP		
October 26	Z.H.P. Unlosing Ranger VS Darkdeath Evilman	PSP		
October 27	Pinball FX 2	X360		
October 28	Bloody Good Time	WIN, X360		
October 28	FIFA Manager 11	WIN		
November 1	PokéPark Wii: Pikachu's Adventure	Wii		
November 2	007: GoldenEye	Wii, DS		
November 2	Atari Greatest Hits	DS		
November 2	Blood Drive	PS3, X360		
November 2	Combat of Giants: Dinosaurs	Wii		
November 2	Fist of the North Star: Ken's Rage	PS3, X360		
November 2	God of War: Ghost of Sparta	PSP		
November 2	James Bond 007: Blood Stone	WIN, X360, PS3, DS		
November 2	Megamind	Wii, X360, PS3, PSP, DS		
November 2	The Penguins of Madagascar	DS		
November 2	Pro Evolution Soccer 2011	PSP		
November 2	Toy Story 3: The Video Game	PS2		
November 2	Ys: The Oath in Felghana	PSP		
November 3	Bit.Trip Beat	WIN, OSX		
November 4	Adrenaline Misfits	X360		
November 4	The Biggest Loser: Challenge	Wii		
November 4	Dance Evolution	X360		
November 4	Kinect Adventures!	X360		
November 4	Kinect Joy Ride	X360		
November 4	Kinect Sports	X360		
November 4	Kinectimals	X360		
November 4	MotionSports	X360		
November 4	Sonic Free Riders	X360		
November 5	Babysitting Mama	Wii		
November 5	Football Manager 2011	WIN		
November 7	Battle Dex	WIN		
November 9	Beyblade: Metal Fusion	DS		
November 9	Beyblade: Metal Fusion – Battle Fortress	Wii		
November 9	Call of Duty: Black Ops	X360, PS3, Wii, WIN		
November 9	The Fight: Lights Out	PS3		
November 9	The Green Hornet: Wheels of Justice	iOS		
November 9	Knights in the Nightmare	PSP		
November 9	Monster Jam: Path of Destruction	DS, PS3, PSP, Wii, X360		
November 9	Rudolph the Red-Nosed Reindeer	DS, Wii		
November 9	Rune Factory 3: A Fantasy Harvest Moon	DS		
November 9	The Sly Collection	PS3		
November 10	Guwange	X360		
November 10	Minute to Win It	Wii, X360		
November 12	Ghosts 'n Goblins: Gold Knights II	iOS		
November 12	Tom Clancy's H.A.W.X 2	Wii, WIN		
November 14	Dood's Big Adventure	Wii		
November 14	uDraw Pictionary	Wii		
November 16	999: Nine Hours, Nine Persons, Nine Doors	DS		
November 16	Apache: Air Assault	PS3, WIN, X360		
November 16	Assassin's Creed: Brotherhood	PS3, X360		
November 16	Crazy Taxi	PSN		
November 16	Create	PS3, Wii, WIN, X360		
November 16	EA Sports Active NFL Training Camp	Wii		
November 16	Harry Potter and the Deathly Hallows: Part I	WIN, DS, PS3, X360, Wii		
November 16	iCarly 2: iJoin the Click!	DS, PS3, Wii, X360		
November 16	Namco Museum Megamix	Wii		
November 16	Naruto Shippuden: Dragon Blade Chronicles	Wii		
November 16	Need for Speed: Hot Pursuit	X360, PS3, WIN, Wii		
November 16	Pac-Man Party	Wii		
November 16	Sonic Colors	Wii, DS		
November 16	Split/Second	PSP		
November 16	Tom Clancy's Ghost Recon	Wii		
November 16	Wizards of Waverly Place: Spellbound	DS		
November 17	Alien Breed 3: Descent	PSN, WIN, X360		
November 17	NBA Jam: On Fire Edition	PS3, X360		
November 17	Pac-Man Championship Edition DX	X360		
November 18	Game Party: In Motion	X360		
November 18	RAGE: Mutant Bash TV	iOS		
November 21	Donkey Kong Country Returns	Wii		
November 21	Raving Rabbids: Travel in Time	Wii		
November 21	Worms: Battle Islands	PSP		
November 22	Poker Night at the Inventory	WIN		
November 23	Arc the Lad II	PSN		
November 23	CSI: Unsolved	DS		
November 23	Hot Wheels Track Attack	DS, Wii		
November 23	Majin and the Forsaken Kingdom	X360, PS3		
November 23	Michael Jackson: The Experience	Wii, DS, PSP		
November 23	Pac-Man Championship Edition DX	PSN		
November 23	Push Panic	iOS		
November 23	Spelunker HD	PSN		
November 23	Splatterhouse	X360, PS3		
November 23	Tangled: The Video Game	DS, Wii, WIN		
November 23	Worms: Battle Islands	Wii		
November 24	Funky Lab Rat	PS3		
November 24	Gran Turismo 5	PS3		
November 29	Cave Story	DS		
November 29	Golden Sun: Dark Dawn	DS		
November 30	Dead Nation	PSN		
November 30	Epic Mickey	Wii		
November 30	nail'd	PS3, X360, WIN		
November 30	Super Meat Boy	WIN		
December 1	TNT Racers	PS3		
December 1	Unbound Saga	X360		
December 3	Borderlands	OSX		
December 6	Fluidity	Wii		
December 6	Football Manager Handheld 2011	PSP		
December 7	Alien Breed 2: Assault	PS3		
December 7	Bejeweled 3	WIN, OSX		
December 7	Hello Kitty Seasons	Wii		
December 7	Qlione Evolve	PS3		
December 7	Sackboy's Prehistoric Moves	PS3		
December 7	Tron: Evolution	WIN, PS3, X360, iOS		
December 7	Tron: Evolution – Battle Grids	Wii, DS		
December 7	World of Warcraft: Cataclysm	WIN, OSX		
December 7	Yogi Bear	DS, Wii		
December 7	Yu-Gi-Oh! 5D's: Duel Transer	Wii		
December 8	Bomberman Live: Battlefest	X360		
December 8	Doritos Crash Course	X360		
December 8	Gravity Guy	iOS		
December 8	Harms Way	X360		
December 9	Dead Rising Mobile	iOS		
December 9	Infinity Blade	iOS		
December 10	Chu's Dynasty	X360		
December 10	Greed Corp	WIN		
December 11	Battlefield Bad Company 2: Vietnam	X360, PS3, WIN		
December 12	Super Mario All-Stars	Wii		
December 14	A.R.E.S.: Extinction Agenda	WIN		
December 14	Revenge of the Titans	WIN		
December 14	X-Men	PSN		
December 15	X-Men	X360		
December 16	Battlefield: Bad Company 2	iOS		
December 16	Lara Croft and the Guardian of Light	iOS		
December 16	Ultimate Mortal Kombat 3	iOS		
December 16	World of Goo	iOS		
December 20	Frobot	Wii		
December 20	Oddboxx	WIN		
December 21	Asphalt 6: Adrenaline	iOS		
December 21	N.O.V.A. Near Orbit Vanguard Alliance	PSN		
December 21	Secret of Mana	iOS		
December 21	Top Darts	PSN		
December 21	TrackMania Wii	Wii		
December 22	A World of Keflings	X360		
December 22	Back to the Future: The Game	WIN, OSX		
December 23	Echochrome II	PS3		
December 29	Raskulls	X360		

== Video game-based film and television releases ==
Title	Date	Director	Distributor(s)	Franchise	Original game publisher	Ref.
Dante's Inferno: An Animated Epic	February 9, 2010	Mike Disa	Anchor Bay Entertainment	Dante's Inferno	Electronic Arts	
Halo Legends	February 16, 2010	Frank O'Connor	Warner Home Video	Halo	Bungie	
Pixels	April 8, 2010	Patrick Jean	One More Production	—N/a	—N/a	
Street Fighter: Legacy	May 6, 2010	Joey Ansah	Streetlight Films Inc.	Street Fighter	Capcom	
Prince of Persia: The Sands of Time	May 9, 2010	Mike Newell	Walt Disney Studios Motion Pictures	Prince of Persia	Ubisoft	
Mortal Kombat: Rebirth	June 8, 2010	Kevin Tancharoen	—N/a	Mortal Kombat	Midway Games	
Zoroark: Master of Illusions	July 10, 2010	Kunihiko Yuyama	Toho	Pokémon	Game Freak	
Resident Evil: Afterlife	September 2, 2010	Paul W. S. Anderson	Sony Pictures Motion Picture Group	Resident Evil	Capcom	
Tron: Legacy	December 17, 2010	Joseph Kosinski	Walt Disney Studios Motion Pictures	Tron	—N/a	

== See also ==
- 2010 in esports
- 2010 in games
