= Archetype (disambiguation) =

An archetype is a concept found in areas relating to behavior, modern psychological theory, and literary analysis.

Archetype may also refer to:

- Archetype (information science), a formal reusable model of a domain concept
- Archetype (video game), a 2010 first-person shooter video game
- Archetype (textual criticism), a text that originates a textual tradition
- Archetype (linguistics) is a linguistic unit reconstructed by the historical comparative method
- Archetypes (podcast), a podcast by Meghan, Duchess of Sussex
- Jungian archetypes, the Jungian psychology concept

== Music ==
- Archetype (Fear Factory album), 2004
- "Archetype" (Fear Factory song), 2004
- Archetype (Tonedeff album), 2005
- Archetype (Susumu Hirasawa album)
- "Archetype", a song on the EP Enter Suicidal Angels by Dark Tranquility
- Archetypes, the alternative title of the album White Light/White Heat, 1968, used briefly for a reissue in 1974

== See also ==
- Stock character, a stereotypical person whom audiences readily recognize from frequent recurrences
