= Alien Breed 3D II: The Killing Grounds =

1996 video game

- Box art by Kevin Jenkins
- Developer: Team17
- Publisher: Ocean Software
- Director: Martyn Brown
- Producer: Phil Quirke-Webster
- Designer: Andrew Clitheroe
- Programmer: Andrew Clitheroe
- Series: Alien Breed
- Platform: Amiga
- Release: EU: 26 April 1996
- Genre: First-person shooter
- Modes: Single-player, multiplayer

Alien Breed 3D II: The Killing Grounds is a first-person shooter game developed by Team17 for Amiga. Published by Ocean Software in 1996, it is the fifth game in the Alien Breed franchise, a series of science fiction-themed shooters.

A sequel to Alien Breed 3D, the game continues the story of a space marine who, having recently survived an alien invasion on an extraterrestrial base and now been rescued by the crew on board an Earth spaceship, is caught in another such invasion that he is forced again to fight off on his own for his life. The game differs from its predecessor largely in improved graphics, as well as level editors bundled with the game and its more extensive use of models, especially for the weapons, though some enemies continue to be rendered as 2D sprites. It also retains a two-player deathmatch multiplayer mode.

The game's release was widely anticipated by the Amiga press and community as a contender to Doom. Reviewers praised the graphics, sound effects, and atmosphere, but were divided on the enemy artificial intelligence, level design, and hardware requirements, particularly for the version requiring 4 MB of RAM. The editors shipped with copies of the game attracted numerous player complaints for missing files, and Team17 uploaded a patch for the editors containing the missing files. The game's programmer, Andrew Clitheroe, disliked the result of its development, stating he wished he had used the time he spent on the rendering engine for developing the gameplay and levels, and Team17 admitted that The Killing Grounds did not meet the company's Alien Breed series' standards in gameplay. The game was the last in the series until Alien Breed Evolution, released in 2009.

== Gameplay ==
The player fights a bee-like creature with a laser gun (Level H, 4-MB version). The bottom-most part of the screen displays text messages, such as the player character's inner thoughts on the current situation.

Alien Breed 3D II: The Killing Grounds is a first-person shooter in which the player guides their character—a lone space marine—across 16 levels, surviving an alien onslaught along the way. The player's character can run, jump, and look vertically. The player utilizes an arsenal of up to ten weapons; they begin the game with a double-barrelled shotgun, and the remainder must first be found and picked up, such as a blaster, a plasma cannon, grenade and rocket launchers, a rifle, mines, and a gun that fires lasers that bounce off walls. Robots armed with energy or submachine guns constitute the bulk of the enemies the player fights with those weapons, but they also include red hellish dogs (the only reappearance from Alien Breed 3D), stick figures, and one-eyed floating monsters. Many of the enemies continue to be displayed as bitmaps, but some, such as the giant bee-like creature, are rendered as 3D models. The weapons the player carries are also now shown as 3D objects.

At the start of each level, a screen of text is drawn, informing the player of their character's circumstances. During combat, the player depletes their weapons' ammunition and must replace one for each by finding and picking up refill packs. The player's character may also sustain injuries, and their energy is replenished after picking up a first aid kit. The player can carry more energy and ammunition than the GUI can display. Some doors are locked, and the player must first find the key to open them. The levels of The Killing Grounds are mission-oriented, with the player instructed to complete a set of tasks, such as destroying a structure. The instructions are relayed as text at the bottom of the screen revealing the player character's inner thoughts. In later levels, an anti-gravity device is found and can be used for brief flights, and it is limited to a few seconds of use before it must be recharged at a fuel terminal. The player can toggle the game's automap feature, which can be panned and zoomed in and out and is automatically drawn as the player discovers new areas. Instead of passwords like the previous game, between levels, up to five games can be saved.

The Killing Grounds has a multiplayer mode that requires connecting two Amiga computers through their serial ports. In this mode, two players fight each other in a deathmatch battle with no enemies and all doors open.

== Plot ==
After surviving an alien invasion on the Osiris base and destroying it, Captain Reynolds's escape shuttle is rescued by an Earth space cruiser, the Indomitable, which then sets course for Earth. However, a massive alien spaceship, having detected the shuttle's distress signal, enters the Indomitable's area, docks the cruiser, and commences an attack, taking its crew hostage. Reynolds awakes in the Earth ship's medical bay, isolated from the attack, and soon discovers that he is forced to fight for his survival on his own again.

Reynolds descends to the alien craft through a shaft connecting the two ships, attempting to find the missing Indomitable crew. After a series of fights with the aliens, he comes across a teleporter serving as a transporter between the craft and a planet. He also realizes that he had been lured into their trap, like the marines on board the Indomitable, and finds he is left with no choice but to teleport to the planet and press on. While there, he determines he is inside an alien military compound, and discovers a computer terminal, through which he connects his mind to a vast network of alien minds represented as bright threads. He sees that the threads intertwine, but fail to join or exchange thoughts, and that a large mass had suffered damage, explaining his observation of the aliens' disorganisation.

After crossing the compound's storage area, Reynolds finds the aliens re-coordinating, and spots another terminal with which his mind then accesses the hive consciousness. He sees the central mass pulsing with light and notices two bright red threads like his own, one vanishing and the other dim, and he infers that the latter represent the captured marines of the Indomitable. After joining his own thread with the dimly lit one, the dying marine informs him to forget saving the crew and instead disable the base's planetary defences, followed by images of how to use the cruiser's autopilot and then of the alien planet exploding as the alien ship, tugged out of orbit by the cruiser, penetrates the surface. Reynolds is told about the locations for three separate orbital computer uplinks controlling the defences. After destroying the uplinks, he conceives of an escape plan involving the destruction of the central mass he had seen back in the alien mind space. He confronts the mass—a giant mantis-like creature—and kills it. With a myriad of aliens lying dead or otherwise unresponsive, many of whom having apparently killed themselves after their minds' linkage with the creature had just been severed, Reynolds finds and steps into a teleporter linked to the orbiting alien ship. He returns to the Indomitable to which the ship remains tethered and programs the cruiser to destroy the planet. The cruiser slingshots around the planet's star and catapults the alien ship towards the planet at 25% of light speed, triggering a nuclear fusion in its core on impact and exploding it, before returning home.

== Development ==
Soon after the release of Alien Breed 3D in October 1995, in the wake of competitors to their first-person shooter, Team17's Martyn Brown commissioned a sequel that would feature improved graphics. The competitors supported a much higher resolution, "but not playability", as Brown saw it, and Andrew Clitheroe, the original Alien Breed 3D's programmer and game designer, returned with the same roles for the new project.

Under the direction of Brown, Team17 were aiming to create an Amiga title similar in technology and experience to Quake. According to the game's producer, Phil Quirke-Webster, the gameplay was changed to more resemble Heretic than Doom; the levels were to feature missions the player must complete, rather than have a strict shoot 'em up style. Clitheroe stated that he sought to implement all ideas cut out of Alien Breed 3D due to hardware limitations. One of these was the enemy AI, which was upgraded so that the aliens could "communicate with each other and operate in teams". The aliens were to be governed by one of several behavioural patterns: overt aggression, alerting others to a hostile's presence before attacking, and retreating to avoid being killed. They would also track the source of sounds the player makes in groups, splitting up if they could have come from multiple directions. However, Clitheroe had since admitted that the player lacked the means to exploit their behaviour, making the game seem unnecessarily hard. Clitheroe also revealed he had put considerable effort into the game's rendering engine, greatly improving the lighting.

It was decided to distribute the game on five floppy disks, with two requiring 4- and 2 MB of RAM each, one for the levels, another for the sound effects, and the last for the level editors, which were only accessible on expanded machines. The expanded 4-MB version would feature vastly superior graphics, whereas the unexpanded 2-MB version would be missing floor textures and forced to run at half-screen with a pixel size of 2×2. Supposedly, the 4 MB The Killing Grounds was suited for Amiga 1200 computers with 4 MB of RAM, but Clitheroe confirmed that it was not feasible to play on one without a 68060-based CPU upgrade.

The game was released on 26 April 1996 as an Amiga 1200/4000 exclusive. Some copies of the game were bundled with a unit of Phase5's Blizzard CPU accelerator card, with discounts as high as 50 per cent. The Killing Grounds was Team17's second-last game for the Amiga, before Worms: The Director's Cut the following year. Although Team17 had a project titled Alien Breed Conflict in the works, which was intended to be a fully 3D sequel to the top-down games in the series for Dreamcast and Windows with an emphasis on stealth tactics instead of the pure action of its predecessors, it was ultimately cancelled, and the series would be revived with Alien Breed: Evolution in 2009, 13 years after The Killing Grounds.

A bundle of editing software written and used by Clitheroe to design levels was shipped with the game, such as a map editor, an object editor, and an animation tool for vector (3D model) objects. However, numerous owners of The Killing Grounds reported that the editors included in one of the game's disks failed to load. Team17 uploaded a patch for download to Aminet, which Amazing Computing magazine wrote amounted to "a whole disk's worth of files" missing in the package.

Team17 made the game's source code available for access in the March 1997 cover CD of Amiga Format magazine. Newly compiled versions have been produced from this source code.

== Reception ==
Reception

Review scores
Publication	Score
Amiga Action	80% (2 MB); 77% (4 MB)
Amiga Format	96%
Amiga Power	59% (2 MB); 54% (4 MB)
Amiga User International	94%
CU Amiga	84% (2 MB); 92% (4 MB)

Alien Breed 3D II: The Killing Grounds was the top-selling Amiga game from August to September 1996, according to Germany-based software distributor GTI. As late as January 1997, it remained one of the top-selling games for the system.

Critics were divided on the appropriateness of the hardware requirements and the enemy artificial intelligence, but were united in their judgement that the 2-MB version ran smoothly but with rudimentary graphics and that the 4-MB version required an Amiga computer with heavily accelerated graphics. CU Amiga justified the requirements by pointing out that Team17 intended to create a definitive Doom-clone for Amiga and noting that Worms: The Director's Cut, another video game of Team17, required an AGA chipset. The magazine praised the level layout and the artificial intelligence, the latter of which had given the enemies "a sense of menace ... that has not been matched" by the enemies seen in the game's Amiga competitors. The enemies have been described as erratic and unwilling to die, and the level layout is said to emphasise the need to conserve ammunition and health for later levels and battles.

Amiga Format praised the lighting, the sound effects in general, the weapon variety, the automap, the enemy artificial intelligence, the level editor, and the challenge and difficulty curve the game presented. It asserted that the enemies had to be disabled for multiplayer mode because of the limitations on data transfer between Amiga 1200 machines, and its only criticisms focused on sounds of walking over metallic floors and dying monsters, and the fact that the player's weapons tend to be aimed towards ground enemies instead of those hovering above them. It favourably compared the game's quality to Doom II and Quake as an Amiga alternative designed for much less expensive computers. Amiga User International believed that the mission-oriented nature of the levels added to the challenge, and declared the game "quite possibly the greatest release ever for the Amiga."

Amiga Action took issue with the game's hardware requirements and the fact that both 2- and 4-MB versions suffered severe technical drawbacks. The magazine found that the 4-MB version was playable only when the screen size was scaled down to half and the lighting setting turned off, even on a 68060-powered Amiga with six megabytes. However, the 2-MB version, which the magazine found to have a much smoother performance, would run at the lowest possible screen resolution, and lacked lighting effects, and the built-in level editor only worked on Amiga machines with at least four megabytes. It also noted the artificial intelligence's flaws such as not being able to open doors. Amiga Power was more critical. Although it appeared to score the game an exceptionally high 98%, the actual scores for 2- and 4-MB versions ranged in the fifties, and the fake score was notably added to fool readers who skip straight to the bottom lines of the magazine's reviews. It similarly criticised the stiff hardware requirements, noting the lack of floor and ceiling textures in the 2-MB version means that the player sometimes cannot discern floor elevation and will thus unwittingly fall off ledges. The magazine went further to question the developer's design choices and the overall gameplay. It wrote that the enemies would occasionally alternate between attacking the player and seemingly "los[ing] interest and wanter[ing] away," and the player could run through them without trouble when cornered. It contrasted the game's pacing from that of the first Alien Breed 3D in that it is impossible to progress in certain situations without a certain amount of health before grabbing the next medikit, which is further complicated by the game saving only between levels. The magazine wrote it felt that Team17 had not adequately playtested the game and called the game's multiplayer mode a "waste of time" before concluding that The Killing Grounds was "a comprehensive disappointment".

For its 100th issue, Amiga Format ranked the game No. 90 on its 1ist of the 100 best Amiga games. Amazing Computing described how the game's lifespan was hampered by Team17's own editor bundling mishap and subsequent patch provided on Aminet, which it called "a disappointment", leading to users uploading only a handful of levels there (in the June 1997 issue, it counted one). Retro Gamer offered a mixed analysis of the game's quality, calling the graphics "absolutely stunning", but criticising the enemy AI and difficulty, believing that the project was overambitious. Andrew Clitheroe was dissatisfied with how he handled development, calling the game "a huge mistake". In the company's own retrospective of the first 100 games they developed or published, Team17 admitted that The Killing Grounds did not meet the Alien Breed series' standards of gameplay, citing its sluggish frame rate and Clitheroe's own admission of inadequately developing the levels, gameplay, and story.
