= Lucas Wolf =

Lucas Wolf may refer to:

- Lucas Wolf (racing driver), German racing driver
- Lucas Wolf (footballer), German footballer

== See also ==
- Lucas Wolfe, American racing driver
