= World of Outlaws: Sprint Cars =

2010 video game

- Xbox 360 box art
- Developer(s): Big Ant Studios
- Publisher(s): THQ
- Platform(s): PlayStation 3, Xbox 360
- Release: NA: February 9, 2010 (X360); NA: May 11, 2010 (PSN); AU: June 21, 2010
- Genre(s): Racing, Sports, Arcade
- Mode(s): Single-player, Online, Split Screen Multiplayer

World of Outlaws: Sprint Cars is a racing video game for the PlayStation 3 and Xbox 360. It was developed by Big Ant Studios and published by THQ. It features 12 Tracks from the World of Outlaws schedule and 20 drivers such as, Steve Kinser and Donny Schatz. It features 8 player online racing with 5 multiplayer modes. In the US it was released for Xbox 360 on February 9, 2010 and the PlayStation 3 via the PlayStation Store on May 11, 2010. In Australia, it was released on June 21, 2010.

== Tracks ==
The 12 tracks in the game are listed below.

- The Dirt Track at Charlotte Motor Speedway
- Knoxville Raceway
- Eldora Speedway
- Volusia Speedway Park
- Williams Grove Speedway
- Lernerville Speedway
- Skagit Speedway
- Dodge City Raceway Park
- I-55 Raceway
- Silver Dollar Speedway
- Huset's Speedway
- Cedar Lake Speedway

== Drivers ==
There are 20 real life drivers in the game.

- Steve Kinser
- Donny Schatz
- Joey Saldana
- Jason Meyers
- Ed Lynch Jr.
- Craig Dollansky
- Danny Lasoski
- Jac Haudenschild
- Jason Sides
- Kraig Kinser
- Lucas Wolfe
- Sam Hafertepe Jr
- Chad Kemenah
- Terry McCarl
- Daryn Pittman
- Randy Hannagan
- Kerry Madsen
- Brian Brown
- Chad Hillier
- Tony Bruce Jr

== Online Multiplayer Modes ==
The game has 5 multiplayer modes.

- Race
- Hot Spot
- Hot Spot Delivery
- Tag
- Bomb Tag

Each of these modes can be played 2 player offline or up to 8 player online.
