= Alien Breed =

Video game series, 1991–2010

- Developer: Team17
- Publishers: Team17; MicroLeague
- First release: Alien Breed; 1991
- Latest release: Alien Breed 3: Descent; 17 November 2010

Alien Breed is a series of top-down science fiction shoot 'em up video games developed by Team17 primarily for the Amiga in the 1990s, heavily inspired by the Alien films and featuring game play reminiscent of the classic arcade game Gauntlet. Later, first-person shooter titles were released under the Alien Breed name. In 2009, the series was revived with Alien Breed Evolution.

In 2026, the newly reformed Commodore International announced that are re-releasing the first six games in the franchise, in a 35th old anniversary collection for the PS5, Xbox Series X/S, Nintendo Switch and PC.

== List of Alien Breed games ==
=== First era ===
- Alien Breed (1991)
- Alien Breed Special Edition '92 (1992)
- Alien Breed II: The Horror Continues (1993)
- Alien Breed: Tower Assault (1994)
- Alien Breed 3D (1995)
- Alien Breed 3D II: The Killing Grounds (1996)

=== Second era ===
- Alien Breed Evolution (2009)
- Alien Breed: Impact (2010)
- Alien Breed 2: Assault (2010)
- Alien Breed 3: Descent (2010)
