= Alien Breed 3: Descent =

2010 video game

- Developer: Team17
- Publisher: Team17
- Series: Alien Breed
- Engine: Unreal Engine 3
- Platforms: Microsoft Windows, Xbox 360 (Xbox Live Arcade), PlayStation 3 (PlayStation Network)
- Release: Windows, Xbox 360; 17 November 2010; PlayStation 3: NA: 22 February 2011; PAL: 23 February 2011
- Genre: Shooter
- Modes: Single-player, multiplayer

Alien Breed 3: Descent is the sequel to Alien Breed 2: Assault and is the third installment of the episodic remake of the Alien Breed series.

== Plot ==
Conrad continues his trek through the Leopold and soon fights against the Klein AI that inhabits MIA's body. After beating Klein, MIA is disembodied but regains her consciousness. She then tells Conrad that the only way he can destroy Klein's maniacal AI is by using her brain core as an EMP device to fry him. After several hours of the derelict ship falling towards the frozen planet below, it eventually crashes and water begins to flood the ship. Conrad then encounters an alien queen which was created by Klein who is overjoyed with his own creation. Klein states that it took him about a hundred years to create a controllable Queen and also tells Conrad that he copied himself to the Leopold's AI system to achieve immortality. Klein plans to leave with the Leopold leaving Conrad behind but Conrad pushes back and fights the alien queen several times. After a second battle against the alien queen, Conrad moves ever closer towards Klein's mainframe lair where he eventually battles both Klein and the alien queen. In the climax of the battle, the alien queen falls over a ledge onto the Klein AI mainframe and subsequently destroys the critical tech that allows Klein to operate. Accessing an opening to a small control room, Conrad uses the EMP that MIA gave him to finish Klein for good. In the aftermath attends to his shoulder wound but ultimately dies due to his injuries sustained from the previous blast. A small pad then drops to the ground and displays an image of Klein's eye logo. Klein can be heard talking but it's not quite clear what he is saying.

== Gameplay ==
Alien Breed 3: Descent, like Evolution and Assault, is a shooter set on board a futuristic spacecraft. In each level, the main character Conrad is given a series of tasks such as collecting key cards, restoring power to various systems, and clearing rooms of hazardous substances (e.g. halon gas or excess water). All tasks must be completed before finding that level's exit in the form of an elevator. Standing in his way are a variety of aliens who will attack him, usually en masse. He can also suffer damage from explosions, fires, electrical disturbances, and enemy turrets. Conrad can run and shoot in all directions, and can collect a number of different weapons and items to aid him. He can also purchase additional ammunition, items, and upgrades from shops found at computer terminals which also function as save points. The camera angle can be rotated manually in 45 degree increments. Data pads are spread throughout the game, which when collected, reveal information on the various alien species encountered throughout the game and provide back stories for the game's characters. The game features a "survival" mode in which players might survive for as long as they can against waves of aliens while using whatever weapons and items they can find around the area. This mode is available in single-player and co-op modes.

== Reception ==
Reception

Aggregate score
Aggregator	Score		
Aggregator	PC	PS3	Xbox 360
Metacritic	64/100	64/100	68/100

Review scores
Publication	Score		
Publication	PC	PS3	Xbox 360
4Players	77%	N/A	76%
Eurogamer	7/10	N/A	7/10
GamesTM	N/A	N/A	7/10
GameZone	5.5/10	N/A	N/A
IGN	6.5/10	6.5/10	6.5/10
MeriStation	7/10	N/A	7/10
Official Xbox Magazine (US)	N/A	N/A	7.5/10
PC Gamer (US)	53%	N/A	N/A
PC PowerPlay	6/10	N/A	N/A
PlayStation: The Official Magazine	N/A	7/10	N/A

Alien Breed 3: Descent received "mixed or average reviews" on all platforms according to the review aggregation website Metacritic.
