= Tilt to Live =

2010 video game

- App icon
- Developer: One Man Left
- Publisher: One Man Left
- Platforms: iOS, Android
- Release: February 24, 2010
- Genre: Action
- Mode: Single-player

Tilt to Live is a 2010 action game developed and published by the American studio One Man Left. It was released for iOS on February 24, 2010. A sequel entitled Tilt to Live 2: Redonkulous was released in November 2013, while Tilt to Live: Gauntlet's Revenge was released in October 2014.

== Gameplay ==
In a closed area, the player controls an arrow directed by tilting the device. The goal is to avoid to touch the red bubbles which appear and move in the area. The player can clean the area by using several types of weapons which randomly appear on the battlefield (Bubble Shield, Electricity, Fire Burnicade, Ice Blast, Spike Shield and Vortex). In destroying several red bubbles in a row, the player builds a combo in purpose to increase their score and beat their own high score.

== Development ==
Developer Alex Okafor was inspired by Geometry Wars, wanting to make a game that he could create in his spare time. He created a prototype and showed it to his work partner Adam Stewart, who helped Okafor work on it until it was launch ready. The theme of the game never evolved from arrow versus dots, as they found it simple and easy for players to understand. Instead, they focused on weapons, writing, sound effects, and music. The two met up once a week to discuss ideas and possible improvements, and then they would go back and continue working on their own respective areas. Both were responsible for the user interface and game design; Adam was incharge of art development, while Okafor was in charge of the engine. The music was entirely royalty-free, which cost about US$50. Development took about six months. Following the successful launch, the pair began work on additional content and features.

== Reception ==
Reception

Aggregate score
Aggregator	Score
Metacritic	90/100

On Metacritic, Tilt to Live received "universal acclaim" based on nine critics.

Several critics gave positive scores.

=== Tilt to Live 2: Redonkulous ===
Tilt to Live 2: Redonkulous has a "generally favorable" rating of 83 on Metacritic based on nine critics.

Several critics praised the game.

=== Tilt to Live: Gauntlet's Revenge ===
Tilt to Live: Gauntlet's Revenge has a Metacritic rating of 78% based on four critic reviews.
