= 2010 in esports =

2010 in esports.

== Calendar of events ==
Date	Game	Event	Location	Winner/s
January 10	numerous games	MLG Orlando 2009		
January 17	Counter-Strike; Quake Live; World of WarCraft	IEM Season IV - European Championship Finals		
January 17	StarCraft: Brood War	EVER OSL 2009	South Korea	Lee "Flash" Young-ho
January 23	StarCraft: Brood War	NATE MSL 2009		
March 6	Counter-Strike; Quake Live; World of Warcraft	IEM Season IV - World Championship	Hanover, Germany	Natus Vincere; Shane "rapha" Hendrixson; Evil Geniuses
April 18		MLG Orlando 2010	Orlando, Florida	
May 22	StarCraft: Brood War	Korean Air OSL #1 2010	South Korea	Kim "EffOrt" Jung Woo
May 29	StarCraft: Brood War	Hana Daetoo MSL 2010	South Korea	Lee "Flash" Young Ho
June 13	Counter-Strike	EPS Germany Season 16 Finals	Germany	Mousesports
July 4	Numerous games	Electronic Sports World Cup 2010	Disneyland Paris	
July 9–11	Fighting games	Evolution 2010	Las Vegas, Nevada, US	
July 18	Counter-Strike	Arbalet Cup Dallas 2010	Dallas, Texas	Natus Vincere
July 27	StarCraft II: Wings of Liberty released			
August 1	Numerous games	IEM Season V - Shanghai	Shanghai, China	
August 15	Counter-Strike; WarCraft III	WEG e-Stars 2010		
August 15	Quake Live	QuakeCon 2010		
August 28	StarCraft: Brood War	Bigfile MSL 2010		
August 29		MLG Raleigh 2010		
September 11	StarCraft: Brood War	Korean Air OSL #2 2010	South Korea	Lee "Flash" Young Ho
October 2	StarCraft II	GSL Open Season 1	Seoul, South Korea	Kim "FruitDealer" Won-gi
October 3	Numerous games	World Cyber Games 2010	Los Angeles, CA	
October 3		WCG Ultimate Gamer Season 2		
October 3		WCG Ultimate Gamer Season 1		
October 17	Starcraft II	MLG D.C. 2010	Washington, D.C.	IdrA
October 23	StarCraft II; Warcraft III	BlizzCon 2010	Anaheim, California	Jeong "Genius" Min-soo Kim "ReMinD" Sung-sik
October 30	Counter-Strike; Warcraft III	International e-Sports Festival 2010		
November 7	Counter-Strike; Warcraft III	World e-Sports Masters 2010	Hangzhou, China	
November 7	Numerous games	MLG Dallas 2010		
November 13	StarCraft II	GSL Open Season 2	Seoul, South Korea	Lim "NesTea" Jae-duk
November 28	Counter-Strike	DreamHack Winter 2010	Jönköping, Sweden	Natus Vincere
December 5	Counter-Strike: Source	EPS Germany Season 17 Finals	Cologne, Germany	mortal Teamwork
December 18	Starcraft II	GSL Open Season 3	Seoul, South Korea	Jang "MC" Min-chul
