= List of Beyblade: Metal Fusion video games =

There are several video games based on Takafumi Adachi's manga and anime series Metal Fight Beyblade. The games primarily revolve around the plot of the anime, following Ginga Hagane and his friends. All of the games so far, vary from the main plot and develop original stories and characters, similar to the anime series. The games have been released on home and handheld consoles. The series is mostly based on Sports and fighters with battling tops.

The first game to be released from the Metal Fight Beyblade series was Metal Fight Beyblade DS, which debuted on March 26, 2009, and the latest release being Metal Fight Beyblade: Bakuten! Cyber Pegasis, which was released on December 3, 2009. There are 6 games holding the "Metal Fight Beyblade" name. Most of the games so far have been released only in Japan. Metal Fight Beyblade: Bakutan! Cyber Pegasis for the DS, and "Metal Fight Beyblade: Gachinko Stadium" for the Wii are the first of its game series to be released outside Japan in North America, and Europe. The first DS game will most likely not have an English release due to it being based on the Metal System, (4-piece tops) and the fact that the game was released a week before the anime started in Japan.

== Series ==
=== Metal Fight Beyblade DS ===
The Metal Fight Beyblade DS (メタルファイト ベイブレード DS) series is a series of children's, Sports, battling top fighting games developed and published by Hudson.

Game	Details
Metal Fight Beyblade Original release date(s): JP: March 26, 2009	Release years by system: 2009 – Nintendo DS
Metal Fight Beyblade Original release date(s): JP: March 26, 2009	Notes: Features 2-player versus mode via Wi-Fi; Re-released on March 26, 2010 as Metal Fight Beyblade DS (Sale Price Edition) in Japan
Beyblade: Metal Fusion Original release date(s): JP: December 3, 2009; NA: November 9, 2010; EU: November 12, 2010; AU: November 12, 2010	Release years by system: 2009 – Nintendo DS
Beyblade: Metal Fusion Original release date(s): JP: December 3, 2009; NA: November 9, 2010; EU: November 12, 2010; AU: November 12, 2010	Notes: Known in Japan as Metal Fight Beyblade: Bakutan! Cyber Pegasis; Known in EU as Beyblade: Metal Fusion – Cyber Pegasus; Choose from up to 17 different characters; More than 20 Beys; Voice commands using the DS microphone; 2 player competition via the Nintendo Wi-Fi Connection or wirelessly using one card!; Supported with Beyblade enhancement function based on experience; Wi-Fi competition/ranking supported
Metal Fight Beyblade: Bakushin Susanow Attacks Original release date(s): JP: July 15, 2010	Release years by system: 2010 - Nintendo DS
Metal Fight Beyblade: Bakushin Susanow Attacks Original release date(s): JP: July 15, 2010	Notes: Choose from up to 36 different characters; More than 30 Beys; More than 40 Special Moves to unlock; Features 2-player versus mode via Wi-Fi.
Beyblade: Metal Masters (also known as Metal Fight Beyblade: Choujou Kessen! Big Bang Bladers) Original release date(s): JP: December 2, 2010; NA: November 15, 2011; EU: 2011	Release years by system: 2010 - Nintendo DS
Beyblade: Metal Masters (also known as Metal Fight Beyblade: Choujou Kessen! Big Bang Bladers) Original release date(s): JP: December 2, 2010; NA: November 15, 2011; EU: 2011	Notes: Features 2-player versus mode via Wi-Fi.; Known in Japan as Metal Fight Beyblade: Choujou Kessen! Big Bang Bladers; Known in EU as Beyblade: Metal Masters – Nightmare Rex

=== Single games ===
Game	Details
Beyblade: Metal Fusion – Battle Fortress Original release date(s): JP: November 19, 2009; NA: November 9, 2010; EU: November 12, 2010	Release years by system: 2009 – Wii
Beyblade: Metal Fusion – Battle Fortress Original release date(s): JP: November 19, 2009; NA: November 9, 2010; EU: November 12, 2010	Notes: Known in Japan as Metal Fight Beyblade: Gachinko Stadium; Known in France as Beyblade: Metal Fusion – Counter Leone; Completely game-specific story with the original characters from the animation; 4 player competition against 3 other human or AI controlled enemies; Choose from up to 20 different characters; Carry the blades you create to your friends' houses inside of your Wii Remote
Metal Fight Beyblade Portable: Chouzetsu Tensei! Vulcan Horuseus Original release date(s): JP: October 21, 2010	Release years by system: 2010 - Sony PlayStation Portable
Metal Fight Beyblade Portable: Chouzetsu Tensei! Vulcan Horuseus Original release date(s): JP: October 21, 2010	Notes: Features 4-player versus mode via Ad-Hoc.
