= Cobra (video game) =

1986 video game

- Developer: Ocean Software
- Publisher: Ocean Software
- Platforms: Amstrad CPC; Commodore 64; ZX Spectrum
- Release: EU: 1986
- Genre: Platform
- Mode: Single-player

Cobra is a 1986 platform game based on the film of the same name. It was developed and published by Ocean Software, and was released in Europe for Amstrad CPC, Commodore 64 (C64), and ZX Spectrum. By 1990, it received a budget re-release.

== Gameplay ==
Gameplay

Cobra is a side-scrolling platform game based on the film of the same name. The player controls Cobra, a cop who must rescue a model, Ingrid, from a villain known as the Night Slasher. The player must avoid various enemies throughout the game, including members of Night Slasher's gang, and people with bazookas. Cobra is initially unarmed and only has a headbutt as a defense. Weapons such as knives, pistols, and laser-sighted machine guns can be found inside hamburgers which are laying around in each level. The player can also duck to avoid attacks, and must jump over incoming prams. Gameplay takes place across three levels: a city, a rural area, and a factory. The player ultimately faces off against the Night Slasher in the factory.

In the ZX Spectrum version, boxing gloves located at the bottom of the screen indicate the number of lives the player has, while a duck symbol gradually depletes as the player's weapon wears out. In the Commodore 64 version, snake heads are used to indicate the number of lives, and a hamburger icon represents the player's amount of energy.

== Reception ==
Reception

Review scores
Publication	Score
Crash	93% (ZX Spectrum)
Sinclair User	3/5 (ZX Spectrum)
Your Sinclair	8/10 (ZX Spectrum)
Zzap!64	13% (C64)
Commodore User	4/10 (C64)
Computer Gamer	60% (ZX Spectrum)
Happy Computer	71/100 (ZX Spectrum)

Award
Publication	Award
Newsfield	Best Platform Game (1987)

Some critics felt that the game was lacking in originality. Some compared the game to Green Beret, and some viewed it as a send up of the film. ZX Computing wrote that the game "stands up in its own right, perhaps because it bears so little similarity to the original film". Rachael Smith of Your Sinclair wrote that the game designers "haven't taken the film quite so seriously as it took itself". Smith considered it one of the best film-based games available, and wrote that it "isn't very original, but it's furious fun". Jim Douglas of Sinclair User stated that Cobra "is just what we all expected. Not great, it's pleasant enough, and not as disastrous as most licence deals". Computer Gamer found "few addictive qualities" in the game and stated that it "offers nothing special".

Paul Boughton of Computer and Video Games considered the graphics and sound okay, but concluded "it's the sort of game you've seen many times before. It will sell on the name rather than on the originality". Crash praised the graphics and music, while reviewers for Zzap!64 criticized these aspects, and concluded that it was an "unplayable, unoriginal, unprofessional, unimaginative and unacceptable licensing travesty". Computer Gamer described the graphics as "OK but nothing stunning", writing that the screen "can end up looking very messy".

ZX Computing described Cobra as "a very fast, very well animated game" but stated that it was difficult to master at first because of an abundance of enemies. Chris Cain of Commodore User also considered the game difficult and concluded that it was "pretty boring" overall. Popular Computing Weekly considered the game "Professional enough in execution" and "quite fun for a short while", but stated that "whether it would hold you long enough to get your eight quids' worth is another matter". ZX Computing wrote that the game would appeal to arcade fans "looking for something a little bit different".

In 1987, it won the Newsfield award for "Best Platform Game". Zzap!64 reviewed the game's re-release and wrote that the "unintentionally hilarious film got the game it deserved". Your Sinclair also reviewed the re-release and praised the graphics, while stating that the game may not appeal to most players because of its difficulty.
