= Battle Dex =

2010 video game

- Developer(s): Bandera Games
- Platform(s): Windows
- Release: November 7, 2010
- Genre(s): Turn-based strategy
- Mode(s): Single-player, multiplayer

Battle Dex was an online, turn-based strategy game featuring collectible cards inspired by Advance Wars and Magic: The Gathering. An open beta of the game ran from April to November 2010 and the game was publicly released on November 7, 2010.

The game was created by Bandera Games, an Austin, Texas–based game development studio founded by veterans of such companies as NCsoft, Realm Interactive, and Vigil Games. The game was free-to-play with the option for users to purchase single-player missions, decks of cards, and points.

Battle Dex is not operational since 2016.

== Gameplay ==
The goal of Battle Dex is to defeat your enemy's army. You build units (such as infantry, heavy tanks, and helicopters) from your HQ, pursue resources, and determine a strategy of attack across a hex-based game board. You are also equipped with a deck of 12 cards that allow you to heal, buff, and debuff units, build heroes, build discount units, build mercenaries, as well as performing a number of "special abilities".

There are two conditions for victory: destroying the enemy's headquarters or being the first to reach a set number of victory points. Victory points are earned by capturing control points. You can also customize your card decks offline, building combinations that suit your particular strategies.

Terrain differs in every map, offering players hills, trees, and water to use strategically for hiding and protecting units.

== Cards ==
Over 178 cards are available to players and many can be earned through online gameplay. Numerous card packs are rewarded to winners of online tournaments. Cards comprise an integral part of the game as they allow for limitless outcomes and enable players to custom tailor their strategy. Cards can be bought from, sold to, or traded to other players.

== Turn-Based Strategy ==
Battle Dex employs a "Wego" simultaneous execution system where turns are divided into a planning and executing phase. While the planning phase can, in single player mode, last as long as the player needs to give orders to all their units, turns in multiplayer games are usually limited to two minutes. Both sides, either computer or another human, enter their orders during the planning phase. During the execution phase, units carry out their orders, but the player cannot influence the result and is limited to watch, replay and move the camera.

== Game Types ==
Battle Dex offers sealed (previously unopened decks of cards) and constructed (pre-built decks of cards) matches. The game types are 1v1, 2v2, Free for All and Random Teams.

There are also 10 single player training missions available that do not require a live opponent. Players are given prizes and rank for completing each training mission.

== Tournaments ==
Example of card element in a typical Battle Dex game

Battle Dex hosts tournaments daily with prizes including cards, packs, points and cash. Tournaments are held for each of the game types and allow competitive players to substantially increase their rank.

== $100,000 Pro Circuit ==
Battle Dex is hosting a $100,000 Pro Circuit event in the year 2011. There are four different event tiers: satellites, qualifiers, pro circuit events, and the world championships. Over $15,000 in prizes have already been distributed.
