= Ninja Chicken 2 =

Mobile arcade video game

Ninja Chicken 2: Shoot'em Up is a 2010 arcade style video game. It was released for the iPhone and iPad on September 30, 2010.

== Gameplay ==
The game features three control types, more than 25 items, and an endless mode. Each control type has its own music.
