= Bar Oasis =

2010 video game

- Developer: Corners Studio Ultramarine
- Platform: iOS
- Release: June 19, 2010
- Genre: Role-playing
- Mode: Single-player

Bar Oasis is a role-playing iOS game developed by South Korean based Corners Studio Ultramarine, released on June 19, 2010.

== Gameplay ==
It is a "visual novel game focusing on drink mixing and the relationships between characters".

== Development ==
In 2009, Corners Studio Ultramarine was approached by an investor to make a game. As a result, the developers chose to either reduce what they were doing at the moment by a significant amount, or quit their current jobs. Before Corners got approached, they were deliberating about what to develop as a four people team. The chief designer was a fan of drinking and cocktails, so he wanted to make something based on those interests. Bar Oasis was initially designed as a cocktail simulator, but Corners Studio thought that the concept alone would be too weak, as there were already some other similar games on the market. They felt that there was a necessity to add an actual background to what was happening on the screen, and the project ultimately progressed into a bartending game. The game's title was influenced by a cocktail drink Oasis, which the team took during their trip to Tokyo.

== Reception ==
Reception

Review scores
Publication	Score
TouchArcade	3.5/5
148Apps	4/5

TouchArcade gave the game 3.5 stars, writing "Bar Oasis is a game you really should try if you've found yourself sucked in to games like Phoenix Wright and other story-driven RPG's", 148Apps wrote "Bar Oasis takes a simple idea and makes it pop by adding great role playing and time management elements to a drink pouring game. This collaboration of genres makes for a solid addition to the app store". Destructoid wrote "Did you happen to check out the original Bar Oasis, and if not, does the game's focus on bartending, its unique visual style, or tasty soundtrack have you interested?". Vandal wrote "Quite a good proposal for those who want to try a different game and meet charming characters while surpassing challenges behind the bar".

== Sequels ==
Bar Oasis 1.5, a free game that served as a bridge between Bar Oasis and its pending sequel, was released on May 2, 2012. A sequel entitled Bar Oasis 2 was released on July 27, 2012. The pop soundtrack is by Korean composer Nauts.

For Bar Oasis 1.5, Kotaku wrote "It's all quite charming and best of all, it's free—Bar Oasis 1.5 got me looking forward to buying the sequel when it comes out, so, mission accomplished, guys. Call it a teaser or call it a fully-formed game, Bar Oasis 1.5 deserves a recommendation all its own." TouchArcade wrote " Don't miss this one. It might be free, but I'd have easily paid for a title as interesting as this and am eagerly looking forward to Bar Oasis 2". Multiplayer.it wrote "Bar Oasis 1.5 delivers an interesting, fresh experience thanks to its "visual novel" approach. The story is very engaging and very well told, and the drinks minigames are funny". Games Master UK wrote "The story has some fun characters".

TouchArcade gave Bar Oasis 2 a rating of 4 stars, writing "Shining praise aside, Bar Oasis 2 does have one problem: mixology gets boring. There are only so many drinks you can concoct before everything begins feeling repetitive. Bar Oasis 2 could have probably benefited from a bit more variation in this department but, compared to the rest of the game, it's still a relatively minor quibble. Either way, this lovely sequel is deserving of your time so come for the drinks and stay for the people." IndieLove wrote "Overall, I really liked this game, it's fun, interesting and different, which is what the gaming industry needs, especially in the iOS category, Corners Studio Ultramarine have certainly done a good job, using all sorts of different features to create a game with so much". Destructoid said "The music here is amazingly well-produced". Reviewing the Bar Oasis 2 Soundtrack, Destructoid wrote "This is a truly a wonderful soundtrack, and it's amazing that it's been written for an iOS app. This shows once again that Korean game developers know what's up when it comes to putting great music in their games. I highly recommend checking out the soundtrack and the app by Corners Studio, both available now".
