= Funky Lab Rat =

2010 video game

- Developer(s): Hydravision Entertainment
- Publisher(s): Sony Computer Entertainment
- Platform(s): PlayStation 3
- Release: EU: 24 November 2010; NA: 30 November 2010
- Genre(s): Puzzle-platform
- Mode(s): Single-player

Funky Lab Rat is a 2010 puzzle-platform video game developed by French company Hydravision Entertainment and published by Sony Computer Entertainment for the PlayStation 3. The game was removed sometime in 2012, but the demo remained available until 2015. It utilizes the PlayStation Move controller.

== Gameplay ==
Funky Lab Rat is a puzzle-platform game that makes use of the PlayStation Move. The player plays a disco-dressed lab rat with a magic wand that has DVD-like powers. The player can pause time and rearrange platforms, rewind time to prevent death, simply reset the level, or can automatically finish the level by fast-forwarding. The goal is to collect a set number of pills and reach the end of the level.

== Reception ==
Funky Lab Rat received a score of 73 out of 100 at Metacritic. GameSpot said that "[n]ovel time-manipulation mechanics are crippled by clumsy platforming". GameZone noted the game as too challenging, calling it "an acquired taste". Eurogamer called the game "engaging".
