= Frobot =

2010 video game

- Developer(s): Fugazo
- Publisher(s): Fugazo
- Platform(s): Microsoft Windows, WiiWare, macOS
- Release: WiiWare: NA: December 20, 2010; PC: NA: January 13, 2011
- Genre(s): Puzzle/Shooter
- Mode(s): Single-player, multiplayer

Frobot is a puzzle/shooting video game developed and published by American studio Fugazo for WiiWare as well as Windows. The word "Frobot" is a portmanteau of "afro" and "robot." The WiiWare version was released in North America on December 20, 2010 and the PC version was released on January 13, 2011.

A European version of the game was planned for WiiWare, but never released due to the shutdown of the WiiWare channel on January 30, 2019.

== Gameplay ==
Players control the titular Frobot, a masculine robot who sports an afro and is equipped for combat. Frobot must rescue his five robot girlfriends from their demise upon their kidnapping. Gameplay involves solving puzzles and battling robots to navigate Frobot through levels set in a top-down perspective. In multiplayer mode, up to four players may fight one another as armed robots.

In single-player mode, the player controls Frobot through different kinds of scenarios while confronting enemies and solving different kinds of puzzles. The game features five different types of environments, different kinds of weapons (such as energy blasts, missiles, etc.) and boss fights. As Frobot rescues his girlfriends he regains all of his powers: remote mines, quick dash, missiles, shield, and a disco ball. Frobot has one competitive multiplayer mode that lets four players battle each other using an assortment of weapons such as energy blasts, mines, missiles, and grenades. The game has 10 different maps with present special features such as destructible walls, moving platforms, and teleporters.

== Development ==
According to the developer, the gameplay could perhaps be summarized if one "imagine[s] if Wii Tanks and The Legend of Zelda had a baby. The baby's name would be Frobot."
