= Space Miner: Space Ore Bust =

2010 video game

- Developer: Venan Entertainment
- Publisher: Venan Entertainment
- Platform: iOS
- Release: February 5, 2010
- Genre: Role-playing game
- Mode: Single-player

Space Miner: Space Ore Bust is a 2010 role-playing game developed by Venan Entertainment. It was released on February 5, 2010, for iOS.

== Reception ==
Reception

Aggregate score
Aggregator	Score
Metacritic	91/100

On Metacritic, the game has a rating of 91% based on nine critic reviews.

Multiple reviewers left positive reviews.
