= Greed Corp =

2010 video game

- Developer: W!Games
- Publishers: Valcon Games, Easy Tiger Media
- Platforms: Microsoft Windows, Mac OS X, PlayStation 3, Xbox 360, iOS, Android, Linux
- Release: February 24, 2010: Xbox 360; February 24, 2010 (XBLA); PlayStation 3; February 25, 2010 (PSN); Windows; NA: December 10, 2010 (Steam); EU: June 3, 2011; Mac OS X; November 1, 2011; iOS; November 2, 2011; Android; December 14, 2011; Linux; October 15, 2013
- Genre: Turn-based strategy
- Modes: Single-player, multiplayer

Greed Corp is a turn-based strategy video game developed by W!Games.

== Gameplay ==
Greed Corp is a turn-based game involving strategic battles on a map featuring a land collapsing mechanic. Players choose one of four factions (Freemen, Pirates, Cartel, Empire) in matches of around 20 minutes. The game also features a single player campaign for each faction.

Players gain credits at the start of their turn and through harvesting layers of land. Built harvesters will slowly destroy the tile they are on and in the area around them. When players harvest too much, the playing field starts to crumble, making depleted tiles collapse. Tactics involve understanding the offensive value of a harvester as well, using it as a weapon and strategically causing destruction to both opponent and playing field.

Credits may be spent on:

- Harvesters, in order to gain more credits and destroy nearby land
- Armories, in which to build troops
- Troops, in order to claim land, and attack other troops
- Cannons and ammo, in order to shoot nearby enemies
- Transporters, in order to send troops to attack from a distance

== Factions ==
While the four factions are completely identical in terms of gameplay, each faction has its own visual style and role in the campaigns.

- The Freemen are a tribal society with great respect for their environment. Freemen units and buildings are made of wood and other natural materials, and consist primarily of cylindrical shapes. Tiles controlled by the Freemen appear to be covered in farm land, and their harvesters take the form of windmills.
- The Pirates are, as their name suggests, pirates who make a living by stealing from others, but also by trading with the Cartel and the Empire. Their units and buildings appear to be built from scrap metal, and are rather angular in shape. Tiles controlled by the Pirates turn into arid deserts, and their harvesters are shaped like walking construction hoes.
- The Cartel is a group of ruthless corporations whose only interest lies in mining the world's resources for profit. The design of their units and buildings relies heavily on spherical shapes and reddish metals, such as copper. Their tiles turn into cobbled ruddy roads, and they use oil derricks as harvesters.
- The Empire is the most heavily industrialized and militarized nation in the world of Greed Corp, and is constantly at war with the Cartel. Their units, buildings, and even the tiles they control appear to be made of steel.

== Reception ==
Reception

Aggregate score
Aggregator	Score
Metacritic	(X360) 79/100 (PS3) 78/100 (PC) 76/100

Review scores
Publication	Score
Eurogamer	8/10
GameRevolution	(X360) B
GameSpot	8/10
GamesRadar+	(PC) 3.5/5
IGN	(X360) 8.8/10
PlayStation Official Magazine – UK	(PS3) 7/10
Official Xbox Magazine (US)	(X360) 8.5/10
PC Gamer (UK)	(PC) 78%
Pocket Gamer	(iPad) 4/5
TouchArcade	(iPad) 4.5/5

Greed Corp received "generally favorable reviews" on all platforms according to the review aggregation website Metacritic.
