= Alien Breed 2: Assault =

2010 video game

- Developer: Team17
- Publisher: Team17
- Series: Alien Breed
- Engine: Unreal Engine 3
- Platforms: Microsoft Windows, Xbox 360 (Xbox Live Arcade), PlayStation 3 (PlayStation Network)
- Release: Microsoft Windows, Xbox 360; 22 September 2010; PlayStation 3: NA: 7 December 2010; PAL: 8 December 2010
- Genre: Shooter
- Modes: Single-player, multiplayer

Alien Breed 2: Assault is a video game in Team17's Alien Breed series and is the second new title in the series since 1996 after Alien Breed Evolution. It was released on Steam, Xbox Live Arcade, and PlayStation Network in 2010. The follow-up Alien Breed 3: Descent was released on 17 November 2010.

The game continues the story of Alien Breed Evolution (and consequently, Alien Breed: Impact) of engineer Theodore J. Conrad fighting against aliens on the Leopold spaceship.

== Plot ==
Assault is an immediate sequel to Alien Breed: Evolution. Conrad, Chief Engineer of the starship Leopold, attempts to restart the engines of a hostile, alien-infested ghost ship that has crashed into his ship dragging them both towards the planet's surface. When this fails, the android Mia boards the ghost ship, and Conrad must escort her to the bridge where she can hack into the ship's computers and restart the engines. Upon arrival, Mia finds that she must connect herself to the ship's main computer.

The ships artificial intelligence then kills Mia and possesses her corpse. It reveals itself to be the ship's chief science officer, who became an AI to achieve immortality. It then reveals that the ship is a 300-year-old scientific research vessel from Earth that went missing and that the chief science officer is responsible for the creation of the aliens. Conrad then sets out to destroy the AI in order to restart the engines. The game ends here on a cliffhanger. Multiplayer co-op consists of players taking control of Barnes and Vance who have been sent by Mia to find and help Conrad. After finding him, they are separated by an alien attack, and both are presumed dead.

== Gameplay ==
Alien Breed 2: Assault gameplay without GUI

Alien Breed 2: Assault is a third-person shooter set in a futuristic spacecraft and played from an isometric perspective. The player controls the main character Conrad across a series of levels and is tasked with a series of missions to progress in the story, and finish each level. Whilst accomplishing these missions, the player will find a variety of alien enemies who will attack on sight. To fight these aliens, the player is provided with a set of different weapons and tools, which can be improved. Ammunition and items such as med kits can only be obtained through computer terminals, which also serve as save points.

Conrad can move freely in all directions; the camera can also be rotated at will by the player. Conrad can be affected by the environment, and he will receive damage if hit by explosions, fires, electrical disturbances, and enemy turrets. Every level has an amount of data pads, which contain relevant information about the game's story. Assault includes a survival mode that puts the player to fight as much aliens as possible before being taken down. It can be played in both single and multiplayer modes.

== Reception ==
Reception

Aggregate score
Aggregator	Score		
Aggregator	PC	PS3	Xbox 360
Metacritic	63/100	69/100	67/100

Review scores
Publication	Score		
Publication	PC	PS3	Xbox 360
4Players	81%	80%	80%
Eurogamer	N/A	N/A	7/10
GamesMaster	N/A	N/A	52%
GamesTM	N/A	N/A	8/10
GameZone	6/10	N/A	6/10
IGN	8/10	N/A	8/10
Official Xbox Magazine (US)	N/A	N/A	6/10
PC Gamer (US)	60%	N/A	N/A
PlayStation: The Official Magazine	N/A	8/10	N/A
VideoGamer.com	N/A	N/A	6/10
411Mania	N/A	N/A	6.7/10

Alien Breed 2: Assault received "mixed or average reviews" on all platforms according to the review aggregation website Metacritic.

IGN gave a very positive review of the game, saying that "It's a small game that feels big while you are playing it, a laudable accomplishment for a $10 title."
