= StarDunk =

2010 video game

Stardunk
- Developer: Godzilab
- Publisher: Playdigious
- Platforms: Android, iOS
- Release: July 12, 2010
- Genre: Sports
- Modes: Single-player, multiplayer

StarDunk is a video game for the Android as well as the iOS. It was made by Godzilab and released for the iPhone, iPad, and iPod Touch. The game has a sequel titled StarDunk Gold. It has achieved over 4 million downloads.

== Gameplay ==
StarDunk is a basketball game where the objective is to shoot the ball through the hoop. Set in space, it is a massively multiplayer sports game where the player competes at shooting against other players, in a space backdrop.

== Reception ==
Reception

Aggregate score
Aggregator	Score
Metacritic	76/100

StarDunk has received positive reviews. AndroidTapp gave it a maximum five stars, saying that it is "huge, online multiplayer, basketballing extravaganza". TouchArcade praised the game, saying "Star Dunk is an entertaining take on a popular sport that should have the competitive types champing at the bit for a long time to come" but criticized the fact that there is no way to challenge friends directly. Gamezebo scored StarDunk 3.5/5. AppSpy called the game "a great time-waster".
