= Vandal Hearts: Flames of Judgment =

2010 video game

- Developer: Hijinx Studios
- Publisher: Konami Digital Entertainment
- Platforms: Xbox 360, PlayStation 3
- Release: Xbox 360: WW: January 20, 2010; PlayStation 3: NA: January 21, 2010; JP: January 28, 2010; EU: March 4, 2010
- Genre: Tactical role-playing game
- Mode: Single-player

Vandal Hearts: Flames of Judgment (ヴァンダルハーツ Flames of Judgment) is a turn-based, tactical role-playing video game by American developer Hijinx Studios for PlayStation Network and Xbox Live Arcade with a release date of January 20, 2010.

== Gameplay ==
Flames of Judgment is a turn-based, tactical role-playing game, where players engage their band of warriors in turn-based combat on a three-dimensional isometric grid against an opposing force. Each character performs an action each turn where he can move, then use a weapon, item or magical ability. Every action increases the character's skill, slowly leveling up overall as the player progresses through the main story.

== Reception ==
IGN gave Flames of Judgment a 7.3, praising the traditional gameplay while criticizing the graphics and art design.
