= Chronos Twins =

2007 video game

- Developer: EnjoyUP Games
- Publisher: Oxygen Games
- Platforms: Nintendo DS; WiiWare; Nintendo DSi
- Release: Nintendo DS: AU: September 19, 2007; EU: October 12, 2007; WiiWare: NA: January 11, 2010; PAL: April 2, 2010; DSiWare: NA: January 18, 2010; EU: May 14, 2010
- Genre: Action-adventure
- Mode: Single player

Chronos Twins, known in the PAL region as Chronos Twin, is an action-adventure game developed by Spanish studio EnjoyUP Games, released in the PAL region in 2007. It was also released in North America on January 18, 2010 and in Europe on May 14, 2010 as a download for the Nintendo DSi system. The game puts a different perspective on time travel than most games. Instead of revisiting an area in two different times, both screens show the same setting during two eras as gamers explore the land with a present-day hero. Chronos Twins was originally planned for release for Game Boy Advance, but after the rise of the Nintendo DS, the game's development switched to that system. An enhanced version for the Wii console entitled Chronos Twins DX was released in North America as a WiiWare download one week prior to the Nintendo DSi release. It was later released in the PAL region for WiiWare on April 2, 2010.

== Story ==
The player takes on the role of Nec, a member of the Llhedar species, who, because of their psychic abilities and the fact that they never give up until the goal is complete, are well suited for missions such as those in this game. The primary mission of the game is to free the planet Skyla from an alien invasion and the powerful entity known as "Twime." Little is known about Twime; she seems indestructible because of her ability to exist in two different times. The player is able to teletransport between the two times by using the "Dual Time", a machine created by the sages of Skyla, the Wise. A secondary objective of the game is to avenge the main character's brother, Nash.

== Reception ==
Reception

Aggregate scores
Aggregator	Score	
Aggregator	DS	Wii
GameRankings	66%	69%
Metacritic	(DSi) 76/100 (DS) 59/100	N/A

Review scores
Publication	Score	
Publication	DS	Wii
The A.V. Club	(DSi) B	N/A
Eurogamer	(DS) 7/10	8/10
IGN	N/A	8/10
NGamer	N/A	60%
Nintendo Life	(DSi) 8/10	8/10
Nintendo World Report	(DS) 5/10	N/A
Official Nintendo Magazine	(DSi) 68%	63%
PALGN	(DS) 7/10	N/A
Pocket Gamer	(DS) 3/5	N/A

The DSi version received "generally favorable reviews", while the DS original received "mixed" reviews, according to the review aggregation website Metacritic.
