= Push Panic =

2010 video game

- App icon
- Developer(s): Appular
- Publisher(s): Appular
- Designer(s): Barry Kostjens
- Programmer(s): Barry Kostjens
- Artist(s): Ricardo de Zoete
- Platform(s): iOS, Android
- Release: iOS; November 23, 2010; Android; May 30, 2014
- Genre(s): Tile-matching
- Mode(s): Single-player

Push Panic is a 2010 tile-matching video game developed by the American studio Appular. In the game, the player must select a group of squares of the same color to prevent them from falling over. After creating his first mobile game titled iGangster, Barry Kostjens would explore coding through developing Push Panic. The game was released in November 2010 for iOS, followed by a port for Android in May 2014. Push Panic garnered a positive reception for its gameplay and graphics but a mixed reception for its soundtrack.

== Gameplay ==
In Push Panic, the player must select blocks of the same color to prevent them from reaching above a line.

Push Panic is a puzzle video game. Through the game's 50-level Classic Mode, the player must select blocks of the same color to prevent them from spilling to the side as they flood in. A game over is triggered when a block falls off the pile. The player's performance is graded with gold, silver, or bronze medals; to complete a level, the player must earn enough points to get a bronze medal.

Outside Classic Mode, Push Panic has three other game modes: Color Panic, Time Panic, and Score Panic. In Color Panic, the player is limited to having eight blocks of the same color on-screen, and in Time Panic, the player is given three minutes to score as many points as possible. Score Panic allows unlimited play, but the rate at which blocks spawn increases every 30 seconds.

== Development and release ==
Push Panic was developed by Appular, the New York City-based indie studio of sole member Barry Kostjens. Originally from the Netherlands, Kostjens created his first mobile game titled iGangster; its success prompted him to pursue coding through developing Push Panic. The game's graphics were designed by Ricardo de Zoete, who Kostjens had met on an online forum.

Push Panic was released for iOS on November 23, 2010, followed by a port for Android on May 30, 2014. In January 2011, the game was featured at AppEvent, and in April 2011, 25 levels and iPad support were added.

== Reception ==
Reception

Aggregate score
Aggregator	Score
Metacritic	88/100

Review scores
Publication	Score
Pocket Gamer	4/5
148Apps	4/5
AppSpy	5/5
Multiplayer.it	8/10
Slide to Play	4/4

On Metacritic, Push Panic has a "generally favorable" rating based on six critics.

Push Panic's gameplay was mostly praised. Some critics found the game straightforward and engaging, while others stated the game's leaderboards added replay value and motivated people to keep playing. Multiple reviewers also described the game as a way to have fun in little time. However, Tommaso Pugliese of Multiplayer.it criticized that Push Panic lacked depth due to the loss of strategy that came with the game's gradual increase in difficulty as well as the usage of power-ups. Conversely, 148Apps's Jennifer Allen expressed that the power-ups added the element of strategy. While Andrew Nesvadba of AppSpy felt the game was "almost unworthy of trying" because of waiting for a chain of blocks to create, he reasoned it was a "training ground" for the other game modes, a sentiment shared by Pocket Gamer's Tracy Erickson and Slide to Play's Nadia Oxford.

The graphics were received positively, while the soundtrack had mixed opinions. Although praising how the game was color blind accessible, Erickson suggested more distinctive patterns for blocks. Additionally, some reviewers saw the soundtrack as repetitive and not impactful.
