= Monsteca Corral =

2010 video game

- Developer: Onteca
- Publishers: Onteca; Nintendo (WiiWare)
- Platform: WiiWare
- Release: PAL: August 20, 2010; NA: August 16, 2010
- Genres: Action, strategy, puzzle
- Modes: Single-player, co-operative (Wii)

Monsteca Corral is a fast-paced action strategy game for WiiWare, created by Onteca, an independent game developer based in Liverpool, UK. The object of the game is to engage in a variety of games and scenarios, incorporating a growth/rearing element, design/construction, and multiplayer combat in a world populated by large lifeforms: monsters and a race of robots.

== Music ==
The in-game sounds of Monsteca Corral feature interactive music and harmonious FX directly linked to gameplay. This bespoke sound system is made up of simple tones which change melody and scale dependent on player activity and was designed for Monsteca by the experimental composer Joe McLaughlin (of the Liverpool electronic rock ensemble, Kling Klang).

== Plot ==
The storyline involves many colourful characters, monsters and robots, which lived side by side in general disharmony. Completely unable to work as a team - in fact "work" and "team" were not in the monsters' vocabulary - the monsters roamed free within their habitats and occasionally risked being painfully dismembered by other monster species if they strayed too far from home. This was their way of life until a small and mysterious do-gooding alien life form arrived.

This lifeform was to be known as The Maker. The Maker was responsible for making many things, and specifically he made robots. The Maker's own planet was dying and his fellow species were doing nothing about it. Seeing the inevitable destruction, The Maker planned his escape.

After crash-landing on the Monsters' planet, he made himself a home and, because he was alone, facing a planet populated by monsters, he created a central processing unit chip and implanted it into a robot companion. Following that, he continued to make more of the chips to accommodate those particular robots. The Maker created the robots in the belief that they would assist him, and also help to maintain and improve the environment of the monsters and provide some form of order and structure for the world, but the idea went horribly wrong once The Maker had enabled the robots to construct other units. They then rejected their Maker as it became clear he served no purpose. The robots continued to build and evolve their own civilization; the chip has been passed from CPU to CPU and has now become outdated and damaged, causing the robots to behave more erratically and to harm the creatures with whom they were originally designed to co-habit. The Maker has become increasingly weary and fearful of his own original creation. The Maker now lives a solitary existence hiding in self-imposed exile. He did, however, once save a small Biguana monster from the jaws of a Blind Polar Dog and made him a robot tail to replace his half-eaten, one knowing that for Biguana's balance is important to their survival. It is now clear that The Maker feels responsible for the robots' behavior and fears he can no longer control their actions.

== Gameplay ==
Monsteca Corral is in a third person strategy format. Within the game there are nine environmental habitats:

- Arctic
- Forest
- Cities
- Coast
- Desert
- Geothermic
- Mountains
- Ocean
- Open Ground

Lifeforms do not live just anywhere on the surface of a planet randomly. Each species occupies a definite set of surroundings, or environment, to which it is adapted. It cannot survive for long outside the limits of that environment because it can no longer obtain what it requires to survive.

Habitats of some species may be specific. Coral for example, are picky about their surroundings and prefer water of a particular temperature and chemistry. Other lifeforms such as rats (and humans) can survive in almost any environment. Different species occupy the different habitats, so knowing the habitats will help players to find particular creatures. Keeping a creature in its preferred habitat (or in conditions that reproduce it) will be beneficial to its well-being and health. Lifeforms will have their habitat indicated in the encyclopedia so that players will know where they might find them.

During gameplay, players will have the opportunity to obtain different accomplishments such as a successfully captured monster, a valuable/useful item, new robot parts or tools to improve an existing collection or currency to buy more items.

== Characters ==
The game has a range of nine characters:

Astro maggots are large, flying herbivorous larvae. They can be found resting in all levels. Once an astro maggot has been awoken, there will be a specific length timed response before it becomes impossible for the herder to get their sdompe aboard.

C.P.U. - Central Processing Unit, also referred to as 'the boss of the robots'. The robots have succeeded through the passing of the 'chip'. The C.P.U. controls all of the robots but he is gradually experiencing more breakdowns/crashes, glitches etc., mainly in his logic and understanding of functions. The present C.P.U. is not particularly nice. He proved incompatible with his unit partner and she left him with a second unit daughter who he struggles to relate to, due to her caring unrobotlike nature. The present C.P.U. is responsible for the current anti-monster regime which he believes will advance robitilisation. He has now begun to 'clean up' monster populated 'trouble spots'.

Heavy Bots are the security guards of the robot community. They are large biped robots and they have a significant amount of strength. Following a sentry bot zapping, they will pick up stunned sdompe and take them to monster 'cages', if the sdompe have not been rescued by their herd. This will be a timed action trigger function. Heavy bots will appear in levels to add difficulty to gameplay.

The Hovership is a medium-sized transport ship with vertical take-off and landing capabilities. It is mainly used for deployment and retrieval of other robot units. The ship retrieves robots from lakes and goop swamps by lowering down a bungee style 'mucus rope'. They are equipped with a winch to airlift cargo.

Imposter bot - herds of sdompe are often pursued by imposter bots. Imposter bots will merrily follow a herd, cunningly infiltrate and then disperse it. They disguise themselves in an unconvincing way as a sdompe who then infiltrate the herd before startling active sdompe and scattering them across the terrain.

Lifterbots are large powerful units with fork-lifts for hands, equipped with lights to work in darkness of the deep freight halls of the city underground. The lifterbot is generally designed to move and transport cargo, but more recently the C.P.U. has decided to make them useful in an alternative manner, to seek and transfer back wild or escaped monsters.

Sdompes are a migratory herbivores that live in southern scrubland areas in summer and cross the mountains to northern wetlands for the winter. They enjoy being in wide open ground with small shrubs and fruits to graze on, though they also spend time close to the forest edges where they can be sure to get a good variety of food and nourishment. A herd of sdompe can be significantly large and have been seen to overgraze areas and can be quite destructive in groups of seven or more.

Sentry walkers are bipedal walker bots, programmed mainly for reconnaissance and sentry duties. Sentry bots can be found in all levels. They will only fulfill predetermined tasks and have no AI capability but their programming makes them aggressive in combat. The sentry bot has a good range and speed in open areas and will zap and immobilise individual sdompe, freeze stunning them for a two seconds period. Sentry bots can be stomped by herds of sdompe and can be pushed into lakes/goop swamps where they will sink and need rescue.

Swamp striders are large herbivores, not known for their physical attractiveness or their winning personalities. They do, however, eat the majority of any vegetation and can cause a lot of damage to crops or forested area. They use their long arms and legs to negotiate wet and unstable terrain and also to dig up roots. They can also wield a healthy kick to robot or sdompe if startled.

== Critical response ==
Reviews for the game have been favorable with IGN rating it 7 out of 10, saying that "its gameplay foundation works just well enough underneath its hallucinogen-influenced presentation that it edges into thumbs-up territory". Nintendo Life described Monsteca as a "Pikmin-like play that packs a punch" and Sean's Wii World complimented the game's unusual approach, stating that the game immerses the players into a world that resembles an interactive art installation, in addition commending its graphics and sound.
