= Little Things (video game) =

2010 video game

- Developer: KLICKTOCK
- Platforms: iOS, Android
- Release: 2010
- Mode: Single-player

Little Things is a 2010 iOS game by Australian studio KLICKTOCK. A sequel entitled Little Things Forever was released on May 31, 2012. In this version, it is a hidden object game, where users attempt to find specific items called "colorful patchworks" hidden in a larger design made up of thousands of "little things" in a list.

A newer version of the game, called Little Things Remastered was released on Itch.io website for Windows, Mac OS and Android for free, including levels from the original game and Forever.

== Critical reception ==
=== Little Things ===
148apps gave it 4 stars, writing "Lose yourself in Little Things. It might be one of the simplest, purest pleasures you've experienced on the iPad yet." PadGadget gave it 4.5/5 stars, commenting "Little Things is a fun game for everyone. If you like games that challenge you by finding lots of hidden objects, this game will bring a relaxing game-play time for you and others. The game is great for any occasion because it's simple and fun, but yet brings a lot of challenges for you. It's a very good download for your iPad." SlideToPlay gave it 3/4, writing "Little Things has a great new approach to hidden object games, but could use some greater optimization."

=== Little Things Forever ===
Little Things Forever has a rating on Metacritic of 90% based on 5 critic reviews.

Gamezebo said " For three dollars (or five in HD)? This is a game for everyone. " AppSpy wrote " Little Things Forever revisits a classic formula, pairing it with amazing visual design and simple mechanics that prove to be incredibly addictive. " 148Apps said "Little Things Forever won't appeal to those who like tons of action or marauding zombies, but for the mellower solving set and as a family activity it's a delight. It's also the rare game where I urge you to turn the volume up – even the music makes for a wonderfully addictive experience. " Pocket Gamer UK said "A sublimely understated hidden object game that shows that, sometimes, subtle improvements to a strong foundation are all a sequel needs." TouchArcade wrote " On every level, Little Things Forever hits all of the right notes: it is easy to pick up, fun to play alone or with a friend, simple yet challenging, and extremely replayable. Fan of the genre or skeptic, there are few games to be found on iOS that are as worth the price as this one. "
