= Hypership Out of Control =

2011 video game

- Developer: Fun Infused Games
- Publisher: Fun Infused Games
- Designer: Kris Steele
- Platforms: iOS, Windows
- Release: iOS; September 15, 2011; Win; September 29, 2015
- Genre: Shooter game
- Mode: Single-player

Hypership Out of Control is a 2011 shooter game developed by American studio Fun Infused Games and released on September 15, 2011, for iOS. A sequel was released on January 20, 2014, entitled Hypership Still Out of Control. The first game was released on Steam for Windows on September 29, 2015.

== Reception ==
Reception

Aggregate score
Aggregator	Score
Metacritic	85/100

Review scores
Publication	Score
Pocket Gamer	4.5/5
TouchArcade	4/5

The game has a "generally favorable" Metacritic score of 85 based on six critics.

=== Hypership Still Out of Control ===
Pocket Gamer gave the game 80%, writing "An engaging and easy-to-play arcade burst with a hard and challenging core, Hypership Still Out of Control doesn't do enough to differentiate itself from its predecessor." 148Apps gave the game 70%, commenting "This remix of fast-paced shoot 'em up Hypership Out of Control should satisfy new players, but those expecting a true sequel will be let down."
