= ProtoGalaxy =

2010 video game

- Platform: Microsoft Windows
- Release: 6 October 2010
- Mode: Co-op mode; single-player

ProtoGalaxy is a cross-genre video game for Microsoft Windows that was released on October 6, 2010. In the game's back-story, a species of powerful, unknown extraterrestrials enters the Milky Way with the intention of enslaving its inhabitants. The player characters must defend Earth from this alien threat and restore human civilization. ProtoGalaxy is a 2.5D game; the 2D playing field employs 3D graphics. ProtoGalaxy incorporates elements of a variety of gaming genres, such as adventure, arcade, shooter, puzzle, and role-playing genres.

This indie PC game is the debut production by Source Studio, a Newfoundland-based company. The idea for the game was originally conceived in 2007 when Alex Brown, Rob Rees, and Albert Chaulk, the three co-founders of Source Studio, were engineering students together at Memorial University.

== Gameplay ==
ProtoGalaxy is presented from a 2.5D perspective; the 2D playing field employs 3D graphics. ProtoGalaxy incorporates elements of a variety of gaming genres, such as adventure, arcade, shooter, puzzle, and role-playing genres. In the game's back-story, a species of powerful, unknown extraterrestrials enters the Milky Way with the intention of enslaving its inhabitants. The player characters, of which there may be up to four at a time, follow a storyline by which they must defend Earth from an alien threat and restore human civilization, rebuilding for the sake of those humans who survive.

ProtoGalaxy is a 2.5D game; the 2D playing field employs 3D graphics.

Players control individual ships, with which they can earn money by defeating enemies and then buy new ship parts. ProtoGalaxy may be played on single-player or multiplayer mode, where players can team up either online or on a single system. Allgame, a video game review website, labelled ProtoGalaxy as an "overhead free-roaming shooter". One of the features of the game is that it allows players to create their own levels, put them online, and download new levels other players have created.

== Development and release ==
ProtoGalaxy was the first product developed by Source Studio, a Newfoundland-based company. The idea for the game was originally conceived in 2007 when Alex Brown, Rob Rees, and Albert Chaulk, the three co-founders of Source Studio, were engineering students together at Memorial University of Newfoundland. Memorial University's business incubator, the Genesis Centre, accepted Source Studio in 2008. Brown called the game "an intense space themed dungeon crawler". ProtoGalaxy was released on October 6, 2010 on the Steam digital distribution platform along with a demo version.

There have been three patches distributed since the game's initial release. The first patch for the game was released on October 21, 2010, while the second came out on October 28, and the third appeared on December 31, bringing the game to version 1.0.5. These updates improved such elements as gameplay, graphics, and the campaign map. The developers also intended to expand ProtoGalaxy with new features and levels. A party celebrating the game's launch was held on October 15, 2010 at Memorial University. On February 25, 2011, Source Studio released Proto Defense, which enhanced the level editor and provided gamers with a new tower-defense-style level as downloadable content. On April 28, 2011, ProtoGalaxy was released on Impulse, another digital distribution platform.

== Reception ==
Reception

Review score
Publication	Score
PC MMGN	(8.6/10)

Harry Hughes of PC MMGN called the game "one of this year's most polished indie titles", praising its immersiveness and tasteful integration of multiple gaming genres. He also highlighted such features as the extensive campaign, the customizability of levels and visuals, and the wide range of possible configurations for players' ship parts. Criticism of the game focused on the rough transitions between views, the slow mouse speed on the control menu, and the cumbersome controls for switching between weapons.
