= Tiger Woods PGA Tour 11 =

2010 video game

- Developer: EA Tiburon
- Publisher: EA Sports
- Series: PGA Tour
- Platforms: PlayStation 3 Wii; Xbox 360 iOS
- Release: NA: June 8, 2010; AU: June 30, 2010; EU: July 2, 2010
- Genre: Sports
- Modes: Single-player, multiplayer

Tiger Woods PGA Tour 11 is a sports video game developed by EA Tiburon and published by EA Sports for PlayStation 3, Wii and Xbox 360.

== Features ==
Tiger Woods PGA Tour 11 features the Ryder Cup tournament for the first time in the game franchise's history. The game also features for the first time a 24 player online multiplayer mode allowing game players to compete in the Ryder Cup online, representing either the American or European side of the tournament.

The Wii version introduces two new swing modes, one being Advance Plus, a mode in which the direction of the swing is tracked, and the other being Tour Pro, in which the camera changes to first person and the club is 1:1 controlled (the club is seen as if looking downwards at it). For this mode, it is suggested that the player places a real golf ball on the ground in order to see a point of reference while playing. The version also adds 36 miniature golf holes and an online disc golf mode.

Also featured is the "True View" feature, a step toward adding some realism to the game by removing some assists, namely the fly-by view prior to taking a swing, forcing the player to use camera positions near the in-game golfer and the map for the green.

== Reception ==
Reception

Aggregate score
| Aggregator | Score | | |
| Aggregator | PS3 | Wii | Xbox 360 |
|---|---|---|---|
| Metacritic | 78/100 | 84/100 | 79/100 |

Review scores
| Publication | Score | | |
| Publication | PS3 | Wii | Xbox 360 |
|---|---|---|---|
| Destructoid | 8.5/10 | N/A | N/A |
| Eurogamer | 7/10 | N/A | N/A |
| Game Informer | 8.75/10 | 8.5/10 | 8.75/10 |
| GamePro | N/A | N/A | 4/5 |
| GameRevolution | B | N/A | B |
| GameSpot | 8.5/10 | 8.5/10 | 8.5/10 |
| GameTrailers | N/A | N/A | 8.2/10 |
| GameZone | N/A | 8.5/10 | 8/10 |
| IGN | 8.5/10 | 9/10 | 8.5/10 |
| Joystiq | N/A | 4/5 | N/A |
| Nintendo Power | N/A | 9/10 | N/A |
| Official Xbox Magazine (US) | N/A | N/A | 6/10 |
| PlayStation: The Official Magazine | 4/5 | N/A | N/A |
| The Daily Telegraph | N/A | N/A | 8/10 |

Tiger Woods PGA Tour 11 received "generally favorable" reviews, according to review aggregator Metacritic.
