= Spaceball Revolution =

2009 video game

- Developer: Virtual Toys
- Publisher: Virtual Toys
- Platforms: Wii, Nintendo DSi, PlayStation Portable
- Release: Wii: PAL: September 11, 2009; NA: September 14, 2009; DSi: NA: February 15, 2010; PAL: April 2, 2010; PlayStation Portable: NA: February 11, 2010; PAL: February 4, 2010
- Genre: Shoot 'em up
- Modes: Single-player, multiplayer

Spaceball Revolution is a game published and developed by Spanish studio Virtual Toys, that was released on WiiWare in the PAL regions on September 11, 2009, and in North America on September 14, 2009. The DSiWare version was released in North America on February 15, 2010, and the PAL region on April 2, 2010. The PlayStation Network version for the PlayStation Portable was released on February 4, 2010, in Europe and on February 11, 2010, in North America.

The object of the game is to match a pattern displayed at the corner of the game screen from a grid of squares where blasting squares can turn it white or turned off. There is a time limit involved and obstacles that will make it challenging over the course of 15 different levels. There is also head-to-head multiplayer battle as well. Some extra levels will have an additional Wii Points fee to acquire via download.

== Reception ==
Wiiloveit.com thought the game was a "really strong contender in the pool of puzzle games on the WiiWare service", praising the "impressive visuals, a robust selection of modes and challenging gameplay".
