= Top Darts =

2010 video game

- Developer(s): Devil's Details
- Publisher(s): Sony Computer Entertainment
- Platform(s): PlayStation 3, PlayStation Vita
- Release: PlayStation 3: NA: 21 December 2010; EU: 22 December 2010; PlayStation Vita: EU: 22 February 2012
- Genre(s): Sports
- Mode(s): Single-player, multiplayer

Top Darts is a darts video game developed by British studio Devil's Details and published by Sony Computer Entertainment for the PlayStation 3. It was released on the PlayStation Store on 21 December 2010. The game features a large selection of traditional darts games as well as an assortment of unique challenges and multiplayer games. It does not support online play. The game features four different locations, each with its own themed dart board. Players can also upload photos from their PS3 XMB as backgrounds for their own dart boards, and create their own avatar using the PlayStation Eye to insert their picture.

A PlayStation Vita version of the game was released in 2012.
