= Archetype (video game) =

2010 video game

- Marketing artwork for Archetype
- Developers: Munkyfun, LLC
- Publishers: Villain, LLC
- Platform: iOS
- Release: iPhone; July 1, 2010 iPad; August 19, 2010
- Genre: First-person shooter
- Modes: Single-player, multiplayer

Archetype is a First-person shooter that was developed by American studio Munkyfun LLC and published by Villain, LLC. It was released for the iPod Touch and the iPhone on July 1, 2010, and later an HD version for the iPad on August 19, 2010. It is set in a futuristic world where aliens have invaded Earth, and revolves around the resulting war.

== Gameplay ==
=== Multiplayer ===
Multiplayer is the core of the game. There are 19 levels, 3 gametypes (Team Deathmatch, Capture the Flag, and Free for All), 7 weapons (Default Rifle, Shotgun, Auto-Fire Gun, Missile Launcher, Precision Rifle, Battle Axe and CTF flag weapon), 2 grenade types (Frag Grenade and Split Strike Grenade) and a maximum of 10 players for every match. Although the player spawns with the Default Rifle, they can pick up other weapons through weapon hunting. There is a ranking system, but you do not earn anything from it. An unusual feature of this game is that by default, there is no trigger button. Instead, the player has to have the crosshairs of the weapon aimed at the enemy in order for the gun to fire (unless the player is using the Missile Launcher or Battle Axe, they must fire that manually).

=== Training ===
Training is currently the only singleplayer option in the game. There are two modes of Training, Regular and Advanced Training. In both modes, you have to take out as many Stationary objects around the map as you can within the allotted time limit.

== Reception ==
Reception

Aggregate score
Aggregator	Score
Metacritic	(iPhone) 78/100 (iPad) 63/100

Review scores
Publication	Score
Destructoid	5/10
GamesMaster	78%
IGN	(iPhone) 8.4/10 (iPad) 6.5/10
Pocket Gamer	(iPhone) 3.5/5 (iPad) 3/5
TouchArcade	5/5

The iPhone version received "generally favorable reviews", while the iPad version received "mixed" reviews, according to the review aggregation website Metacritic. Levi Buchanan of IGN called the iPhone version "a great little multiplayer shooter, perfect for jumping in and out of a few times a day to satisfy (virtual) bloodlust. And, in my experience, it works well both over-the-air and via WiFi." TouchArcade and Slide to Play both gave the same iPhone version a perfect score.

Pocket Gamer, however, was not as pleased. In their review, they called the same iPhone version "a great-looking and fun shooter, but it has improvements to make before becoming the essential iPhone shooter."
