= Lucas Wolfe =

American race car driver (born 1986)

- Nationality: American
- Born: October 22, 1986 (age 40) Mechanicsburg, Pennsylvania

World of Outlaws career
- Debut season: 2007
- Best finish: 1st in 2012

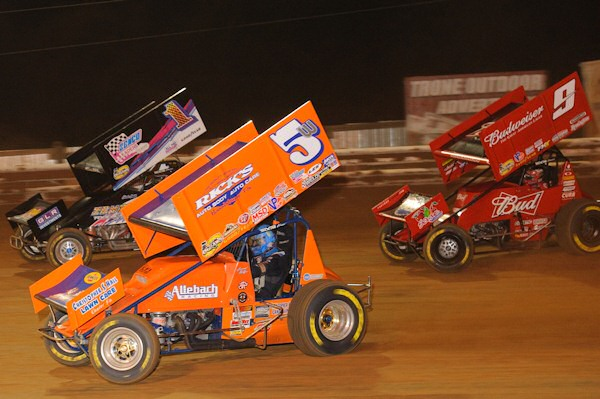
Wolfe (#5) leads Stevie Smith (#1) and Joey Saldana (#9) in a World of Outlaws sprint car race at Williams Grove Speedway in 2010

Lucas Wolfe (born October 22, 1986) is an American race car driver. He currently races in the central Pennsylvania area in the 410 sprint car division.

== Early life and education ==
Wolfe was born in Mechanicsburg, Pennsylvania, his father Randy Wolfe was a regular competitor in Central Pennsylvania in the 410 division. He began Quarter Midget racing in 1992 as a five-year-old. In both 1993 and 1994, Wolfe was the Norlebco Quarter Midget champion. From 1993 to 2000, Wolfe had 338 race starts—90 of which he won.

== Professional career ==
=== 2001–2002 ===
In 2001, at fourteen years old, Wolfe began racing 600cc micro sprint cars at Linda’s Speedway in Pennsylvania. He won six feature races and became the 2001 Linda’s Speedway Rookie of the Year. Wolfe won eight feature races in 2002 and became the Trail-Way Speedway Track Champion. He was also the 2002 runner-up in the Linda’s Speedway Points Championship.

=== 2003–2007 ===
In 2003, sixteen-year-old Wolfe began racing 410 winged sprint cars. Wolfe often raced several nights a week. He was a 2003 finalist for the National Sprint Car Poll Rookie of the Year as well as a runner-up for the Williams Grove Speedway Rookie of the Year.

On July 9, 2004, at Williams Grove Speedway, Wolfe won his first sprint car race. Wolfe was the youngest race winner in the 65-year history of Williams Grove Speedway. He won again at Williams Grove Speedway (the Jack Gunn Memorial race) on September 5, 2004, and at the Clinton County Speedway on October 10, 2004. Wolfe was selected as one of “ten promising young American racers” in the Red Bull Driver Search.

On June 29, 2005, Wolfe set a track record for a single lap at the Silver Spring Speedway. From 2005 to 2007, he won 14 feature events and several championships. Wolfe started racing part-time in the WoO Series in 2007 and earned three awards for fastest qualifying time.

=== 2008–2012 ===
==== World of Outlaws ====
In 2008, Wolfe began racing full-time in the World of Outlaws. On June 9, 2008, Wolfe crashed while running a preliminary heat at Tri-County Speedway in Illinois. He suffered cracked vertebrae in his upper back, an injury that would force Wolfe to sit out much of the 2008 season. Wolfe, however, had a late season comeback. He finished 2008 with nine top-five finishes and the honor of 2008 WoO Rookie of the Year.

In every season from 2009 to 2012, Wolfe finished as one of the top ten WoO drivers. His place finishes in the points championship are as follows: tenth in 2009, eighth in 2010, seventh in 2011, and ninth in 2012.

Despite some mechanical struggles in the early part of the summer of 2012, Wolfe won his first World of Outlaws feature event on August 3, 2012, at Bloomington Speedway. Wolfe led the race for the final 22 laps.

=== 2013 ===
On February 13, 2013, Wolfe was announced as the driver of the Buffalo Wild Wings No. 82 fielded by Blazing Racing. Wolfe split from the team on June 12, 2013.

=== 2014-2016 ===
Wolfe was announced as the driver of the John and Pee Wee Zemaitis "Zemco #1" for the 2014 season. The team had multiple wins and was the 2014 Pa Speedweek Champion.

=== 2017-2020 ===
Wolfe was hired as the driver of the Michael Barshinger 24 for 2017. Wolfe was the 2018 Williamsgrove track champion. 2017 and 2019 Pa Speedweek Champions. Multiple wins including the 2017 and 2018 Bob Weikert Memorial.

=== 2021-2025 ===
Wolfe started 2021 in Mark Coldren's 07 on the Allstar Circuit of Champions the pair split in May of 2021. He then returned to the 5w fulltime for owners Jim and Laura Allebach with Hollinger Motorsports. The car carried Pabst Blue Ribbon sponsorship and was later sponsored by Old Milwaukee, as well as Orange Crate Brewing and Hollinger Motorsports.

=== 2026 ===
Wolfe was found rideless for the start of the 2026 season. On July 10th 2026 he was hired to drive the iconic 39 in Central Pennsylvania for legendary car owner John Trone.

==== Other sprint car racing ====
Outside of the WoO, Wolfe has raced sprint cars internationally in Australia and New Zealand. In addition to the 410 cid sprint cars Wolfe typically raced, he occasionally raced in 360 cid sprint cars.

== Personal life ==
Wolfe resides in Mechanicsburg Pa. He is the son of former sprint car driver Randy Wolfe.

== Racing record ==
=== Recent career summary ===
Season	Series & Car Type	Wins	Fastest Qual. Time	Top 5 Finishes	Top 10 Finishes	Championship Position
2012	WoO sprint cars	1	1	10	30	9
2012	other sprint cars	2	0	4	5	---
2011	WoO sprint cars	0	0	7	25	7
2011	other sprint cars	1	0	2	8	---
2010	WoO sprint cars	0	5	14	28	8
2010	other sprint cars	1	0	5	11	---
2009	WoO sprint cars	0	2	5	18	10
2009	other sprint cars	0	0	2	3	---
2008†	WoO sprint cars	0	0	3	9	17
2008†	other sprint cars	0	1	6	14	---

† partial season due to injury
