= Alien Breed Evolution =

2009 video game

Alien Breed: Evolution
- Developer: Team17
- Publisher: Team17
- Series: Alien Breed
- Engine: Unreal Engine 3
- Platforms: Xbox 360; Microsoft Windows; PlayStation 3
- Release: Xbox 360; 16 December 2009; Windows; 3 June 2010; PlayStation 3; PAL: 1 September 2010; NA: 5 October 2010
- Genre: Isometric shooter
- Modes: Single-player, multiplayer

Alien Breed: Evolution (known as Alien Breed: Evolution – Episode 1) is an isometric shooter game in Team17's Alien Breed series and is the first title in the series since 1996. It was released for the Xbox 360 on 16 December 2009. An updated version called Alien Breed: Impact was released for Microsoft Windows and PlayStation 3 in the following year. It was followed by Alien Breed 2: Assault released in September 2010.

== Plot ==
Theodore J. Conrad is an engineer on the spaceship Leopold when it drops out of hyperspace and has a collision with a mysterious ghost ship which is populated by numerous hostile alien beings. Just before the collision, Conrad is visited by the android Mia, who asks him why he is against synthetics (the name for androids in the game) and saves him from a piece of debris, from the ghost ship, that pierces Conrad's room when the collision occurs. Mia then sends Conrad to restart the Leopold's engines to avert both ships from crashing into the unnamed planet below. Conrad discovers that the engines are too badly damaged and boards the ghost ship to attempt to restart its engines. He discovers that the ship is controlled by an anti-human force and its defenses have been programmed to attack humans on sight. He eventually comes across a large pool, out of which a large alien rises during a communication from Mia. Conrad says to Mia, "I'll call you back", and ends the game on a cliffhanger.

In the co-op Assault multiplayer levels, two men, Thadeus Barnes and Eddie Vance, are trying to locate Conrad; they eventually find him in the engine room where Mia tells them that a hull breach in the hydroponics section threatens to destroy the ship. They volunteer to seal this hull breach; on succeeding in this task, their campaign ends.

== Gameplay ==
Alien Breed: Evolution is a top-down shooter set onboard futuristic space craft. In each level, the main character, Conrad, is set a series of tasks, such as collecting key cards, restoring power, or escorting innocents, which he must complete before finding that level's exit in the form of an elevator. Standing in his way are several different types of aliens who will attack him, usually en masse. Conrad can run and shoot in all directions, and can collect a number of different weapons and items to aid him. The camera angle can be rotated manually in 45 degree increments. There are also several data pads to collect, which provide information on the different alien species that Conrad encounters throughout the game, back story information on the game's characters, and additional information on the game's locations.

== Alien Breed: Impact ==
A version of Alien Breed: Evolution was released on PlayStation Network and Steam, renamed Alien Breed: Impact. This version was expanded to include redesigned aliens and an Upgrade Shop.

== Reception ==
Reception

Aggregate score
Aggregator	Score		
Aggregator	PC	PS3	Xbox 360
Metacritic	64/100	71/100	69/100

Review scores
Publication	Score		
Publication	PC	PS3	Xbox 360
4Players	81%	80%	80%
Edge	N/A	N/A	5/10
Eurogamer	7/10	N/A	7/10
Gamekult	4/10	N/A	N/A
GameSpot	N/A	N/A	6/10
IGN	N/A	7.5/10	7.9/10
Official Xbox Magazine (US)	N/A	N/A	6/10
PC Gamer (US)	59%	N/A	N/A
TeamXbox	N/A	N/A	8.2/10
VideoGamer.com	N/A	N/A	6/10
411Mania	N/A	7/10	7.5/10
Teletext GameCentral	N/A	N/A	6/10

The game received "mixed or average reviews" on all platforms according to the review aggregation website Metacritic. Many critics found the game repetitive and complained about the lack of variety throughout its campaign.

IGN commented of the Xbox 360 version: "Anyone who played the original Alien Breed back in the day will find their simple top-down shooter is all grown up with great lighting effects, an atmospheric soundtrack, and affecting cinematic events -- but the gameplay itself is rooted in 1990." Eurogamer praised the production values, but added that "a flawed approach to co-op play and an inherent lack of variety ultimately count against it." Edge gave a scathing review, stating: "Repetitive and simplistic, Alien Breed: Evolution may remain true to its inspiration, but this first episode does no more than reinforce Team17's reputation for serviceable but uninspiring updates of past glories."
