= List of video games by Team17 =

This is a list of video games developed and/or published by Team17.

== Games developed ==
Year	Title	Publisher(s)	Platform(s)
1991	Full Contact	Team17	Amiga
1991	Alien Breed	Team17, MicroLeague	Amiga, Amiga CD32, Android, iOS, MS-DOS, PlayStation 3, PlayStation Vita
1992	Project-X	Team17	Amiga, Amiga CD32, MS-DOS
1993	Alien Breed II: The Horror Continues	Team17	Amiga, Amiga CD32
1993	Superfrog	Team17	Amiga, Amiga CD32, MS-DOS
1993	Body Blows	Team17	Amiga, MS-DOS
1994	Arcade Pool	Team17	Amiga, Amiga CD32, MS-DOS
1994	Body Blows Galactic	Team17	Amiga
1994	Apache	Team17	Amiga
1994	Alien Breed: Tower Assault	Team17	Amiga, Amiga CD32, MS-DOS
1994	Ultimate Body Blows	Team17	Amiga, Amiga CD32, MS-DOS
1995	Kingpin: Arcade Sports Bowling	Team17	Amiga, Amiga CD32, MS-DOS
1995	Worms	Ocean Software	Amiga, Amiga CD32, Atari Jaguar, Classic Mac OS, Game Boy, MS-DOS, PlayStation, Sega Mega Drive, Sega Saturn, Super Nintendo Entertainment System
1995	Alien Breed 3D	Ocean Software	Amiga, Amiga CD32
1996	Alien Breed 3D II: The Killing Grounds	Ocean Software	Amiga
1996	World Rally Fever	Ocean Software	MS-DOS
1996	X2	Ocean Software	PlayStation
1997	Worms: The Director's Cut	Ocean Software	Amiga
1997	Worms 2	Team17, MicroProse	Microsoft Windows
1998	Addiction Pinball	MicroProse, Infogrames	Microsoft Windows, PlayStation
1999	Arcade Pool II	MicroProse	Microsoft Windows
1999	Phoenix	Hasbro Interactive, Team17	Microsoft Windows
1999	Worms Armageddon	Hasbro Interactive, Team17	Dreamcast, Microsoft Windows, PlayStation
1999	Worms Pinball	Infogrames	Microsoft Windows
2001	Worms World Party	Titus Interactive, Team17	Dreamcast, Gizmondo, Microsoft Windows, PlayStation
2001	Stunt GP	Eon Digital Entertainment, Titus Interactive	Dreamcast. Microsoft Windows, PlayStation 2
2002	Worms Blast	Ubi Soft, Feral Interactive	GameCube, macOS, Microsoft Windows, PlayStation 2
2003	Worms 3D	Sega, Acclaim Entertainment, Feral Interactive	GameCube, macOS, Microsoft Windows, PlayStation 2
2004	Worms Forts: Under Siege	Sega	Microsoft Windows, PlayStation 2, Xbox
2005	Worms 4: Mayhem	Codemasters, Majesco	Microsoft Windows, PlayStation 2, Xbox
2006	Worms: Open Warfare	THQ	Nintendo DS, PlayStation Portable
2006	Lemmings	Sony Computer Entertainment	PlayStation Portable, PlayStation 2, PlayStation Mobile
2006	Army Men: Major Malfunction	Global Star Software	PlayStation 2, Xbox
2006	Lemmings	Sony Computer Entertainment	PlayStation 3
2007	Worms	Microsoft Game Studios, Sony Computer Entertainment, Team17	iOS, PlayStation 3, Xbox 360
2007	Worms: Open Warfare 2	THQ	Nintendo DS, PlayStation Portable
2008	Worms: A Space Oddity	THQ	Wii
2009	Worms 2: Armageddon	Team17	Android, iOS, PlayStation 3, Xbox 360
2009	Leisure Suit Larry: Box Office Bust	Funsta	Microsoft Windows, PlayStation 3, Xbox 360
2009	Alien Breed Evolution	Team17	Xbox 360
2010	Worms Reloaded	Team17	Linux, macOS, Microsoft Windows
2010	Alien Breed: Impact	Team17	Microsoft Windows, PlayStation 3
2010	Alien Breed 2: Assault	Team17	Microsoft Windows, PlayStation 3, Xbox 360
2010	Alien Breed 3: Descent	Team17	Microsoft Windows, PlayStation 3, Xbox 360
2010	Worms: Battle Islands	Team17, THQ	PlayStation Portable, Wii
2011	Worms Ultimate Mayhem	Team17	Microsoft Windows, PlayStation 3, Xbox 360
2011	Worms Crazy Golf	Team17	iOS, macOS, Microsoft Windows, PlayStation 3
2012	Worms Revolution	Team17	Microsoft Windows, PlayStation 3, Xbox 360
2013	Superfrog HD	Team17	Android, iOS, Linux, macOS, Microsoft Windows, PlayStation 3, PlayStation Vita
2013	Worms Clan Wars	Team17	Linux, macOS, Microsoft Windows
2013	Worms 3	Team17	Android, iOS, macOS
2014	Worms Battlegrounds	Team17	PlayStation 4, Xbox One
2014	(R)evolve	Team17	iOS
2014	Flockers	Team17	Android, iOS, Linux, macOS, Microsoft Windows, PlayStation 4, Xbox One
2015	Worms World Party Remastered	Team17	Microsoft Windows
2015	Worms 4	Team17	Android, iOS
2015	The Escapists: The Walking Dead	Team17	Linux, macOS, Microsoft Windows
2016	10 Minute Tower	Sega	Microsoft Windows
2016	Worms W.M.D	Team17	Linux, macOS, Microsoft Windows, Nintendo Switch, PlayStation 4, Xbox One, iOS, Android
2017	The Escapists 2	Team17	Linux, macOS, Microsoft Windows, Nintendo Switch, PlayStation 4, Xbox One
2018	Overcooked 2	Team17	Microsoft Windows, Nintendo Switch, PlayStation 4, Xbox One, PlayStation 5, Xbox Series X/S
2020	The Survivalists	Team17	Microsoft Windows, Nintendo Switch, PlayStation 4, Xbox One, Apple Arcade (iOS, macOS, tvOS, iPadOS)
2020	Worms Rumble	Team17	Microsoft Windows, Nintendo Switch, PlayStation 4, Xbox One, PlayStation 5, Xbox Series X/S
2023	Killer Frequency	Team17	Microsoft Windows, Nintendo Switch, PlayStation 4, Xbox One, PlayStation 5, Xbox Series X/S, Meta Quest 2, Meta Quest 3, Meta Quest 3S
2027	Golf With Your Friends 2	Team17	Microsoft Windows, Nintendo Switch 2, PlayStation 5, Xbox Series X/S
2027	The Escapists 3	Team17	Microsoft Windows, Nintendo Switch 2, PlayStation 5, Xbox Series X/S

== Games published ==
Year	Title	Developer(s)	Platform(s)
1992	Assassin	Psionic Systems	Amiga
1993	F17 Challenge	Holodream Software	Amiga
1993	Qwak	Jamie Woodhouse	Amiga
1993	Overdrive	Psionic Systems	Amiga, MS-DOS
1993	Silverball	Digital Extremes, Epic MegaGames	MS-DOS
1994	Super Stardust	Bloodhouse	Amiga, Amiga CD32
1995	ATR: All Terrain Racing	Jamie Woodhouse	Amiga, Amiga CD32
1996	The Speris Legacy	Binary Emotions	Amiga, Amiga CD32
1997	Profits Warning	Bubball Systems	MS-DOS
1998	Nightlong: Union City Conspiracy	Trecision	Amiga, Microsoft Windows
2013	Light	Just a Pixel	Linux, macOS, Microsoft Windows
2014	Hay Ewe	Rocket Rainbow	iOS
2014	Schrödinger's Cat and the Raiders of the Lost Quark	Italic Pig	Linux, macOS, Microsoft Windows, PlayStation 4, Xbox One
2015	The Escapists	Mouldy Toof Studios	Android, iOS, Linux, macOS, Microsoft Windows, PlayStation 4, Xbox 360, Xbox One
2015	LA Cops	Modern Dream	Linux, macOS, Microsoft Windows, PlayStation 4, Xbox One
2015	Beyond Eyes	Tiger & Squid	Linux, macOS, Microsoft Windows, PlayStation 4, Xbox One
2015	Overruled!	Dlala Studios	Linux, macOS, Microsoft Windows, PlayStation 4, Xbox One
2015	Penarium	Self Made Miracle	Linux, macOS, Microsoft Windows, PlayStation 4, Xbox One
2016	Sheltered	Unicube	Linux, macOS, Microsoft Windows, PlayStation 4, Xbox One
2016	Not a Hero: Super Snazzy Edition	Roll7	Xbox One
2016	OlliOlli2: XL Edition	Roll7	Xbox One
2016	Overcooked	Ghost Town Games	Microsoft Windows, Nintendo Switch, PlayStation 4, Xbox One, PlayStation 5, Xbox Series X/S
2016	Lethal VR	Three Fields Entertainment	Microsoft Windows, PlayStation 4
2017	Yooka-Laylee	Playtonic Games	Linux, macOS, Microsoft Windows, Nintendo Switch, PlayStation 4, Xbox One
2017	Aven Colony	Mothership Entertainment	Microsoft Windows, PlayStation 4, Xbox One
2017	Interplanetary: Enhanced Edition	Team Jolly Roger	Microsoft Windows
2018	Raging Justice	MakinGames	macOS, Microsoft Windows, Nintendo Switch, PlayStation 4, Xbox One
2018	Yoku's Island Express	Villa Gorilla	Microsoft Windows, Nintendo Switch, PlayStation 4, Xbox One
2018	Mugsters	Reinkout Games	macOS, Microsoft Windows, Nintendo Switch, PlayStation 4, Xbox One
2018	Sword Legacy: Omen	Firecast Studio, Fableware Narrative Design	Microsoft Windows
2018	Forged Battalion	Petroglyph Games	Microsoft Windows
2018	Planet Alpha	Planet Alpha ApS	Microsoft Windows, Nintendo Switch, PlayStation 4, Xbox One
2019	Genesis Alpha One	Radiation Blue	Microsoft Windows, PlayStation 4, Xbox One
2019	My Time at Portia	Pathea Games	Microsoft Windows, Nintendo Switch, PlayStation 4, Xbox One
2019	Automachef	Hermes Interactive	Microsoft Windows, Nintendo Switch
2019	Yooka-Laylee and the Impossible Lair	Playtonic Games	Linux, macOS, Microsoft Windows, Nintendo Switch, PlayStation 4, Xbox One
2019	Blasphemous	The Game Kitchen	Microsoft Windows, Nintendo Switch, PlayStation 4, Xbox One
2020	Moving Out	SMG Studio, DEVM Games	Microsoft Windows, Nintendo Switch, PlayStation 4, Xbox One
2020	Golf With Your Friends	Blacklight Interactive	macOS, Microsoft Windows, Nintendo Switch, PlayStation 4, Xbox One
2020	Ageless	One More Dream Studios	Microsoft Windows, Nintendo Switch
2020	Neon Abyss	Veewo Games	Microsoft Windows, Nintendo Switch, PlayStation 4, Xbox One
2020	Crown Trick	NExT Studios	Microsoft Windows, Nintendo Switch
2020	Going Under	Aggro Crab Games	Microsoft Windows, Nintendo Switch, PlayStation 4, Xbox One
2020	Monster Sanctuary	Moi Rai Games	Microsoft Windows, Nintendo Switch, PlayStation 4, Xbox One
2021	Rogue Heroes: Ruins of Tasos	Heliocentric Studios	Microsoft Windows, Nintendo Switch
2021	Narita Boy	Studio Koba	Microsoft Windows, Nintendo Switch, PlayStation 4, Xbox One
2021	Super Magbot	Astral Pixel	Microsoft Windows
2021	King of Seas	3DClouds	Microsoft Windows, Nintendo Switch, PlayStation 4, Xbox One
2021	Greak: Memories of Azur	Navegante Entertainment	Microsoft Windows, Nintendo Switch, PlayStation 4, Xbox One
2021	Age of Darkness: Final Stand	Playside	Microsoft Windows
2021	Sheltered 2	Unicube	Microsoft Windows
2021	Hell Let Loose	Black Matter	Microsoft Windows, PlayStation 5, Xbox Series X/S
2021	Before We Leave	Balancing Monkey Games	Microsoft Windows, PlayStation 4, PlayStation 5, Xbox One, Xbox Series X/S
2022	Thymesia	OverBorder Studio	Microsoft Windows, Nintendo Switch, PlayStation 4, PlayStation 5, Xbox One, Xbox Series X/S, Amazon Luna
2022	The Serpent Rogue	Sengi Games	Microsoft Windows
2022	Batora: Lost Haven	Stormind Games	Microsoft Windows, Nintendo Switch, PlayStation 4, PlayStation 5, Xbox One, Xbox Series X/S
2022	Hokko Life	Wonderscope Games	Microsoft Windows, Nintendo Switch, PlayStation 4, Xbox One
2022	Sunday Gold	BKOM Studios	Microsoft Windows
2022	Bravery & Greed	Rekka Games	Microsoft Windows, Nintendo Switch, PlayStation 4, Xbox One
2022	Ship of Fools	Fika Productions	Microsoft Windows, Nintendo Switch, PlayStation 4, PlayStation 5, Xbox One, Xbox Series X/S
2022	The Knight Witch	Super Mega Team	Microsoft Windows, Nintendo Switch, PlayStation 4, PlayStation 5, Xbox One, Xbox Series X/S
2022	Honey, I Joined a Cult	Sole Survivor Games	Microsoft Windows
2023	Farmside	Topia Studios	iOS, macOS, tvOS (Note: Released on Apple Arcade. Published by Team17 USA.)
2023	King of the Castle	Tributary Games	Microsoft Windows
2023	Summon Quest	Topia Studios	iOS, macOS, tvOS (Note: Released on Apple Arcade. Published by Team17 USA.)
2023	Dredge	Black Salt Games	Microsoft Windows, Nintendo Switch, PlayStation 4, PlayStation 5, Xbox One, Xbox Series X/S
2023	Trepang2	Trepang Studios	Microsoft Windows
2023	Moving Out 2	SMG Studio, Devm Games	Microsoft Windows, Nintendo Switch, PlayStation 4, PlayStation 5, Xbox One, Xbox Series X/S
2023	Gord	Covenant.dev	Microsoft Windows, PlayStation 5, Xbox Series X/S
2023	Blasphemous 2	The Game Kitchen	Microsoft Windows, Nintendo Switch, PlayStation 5, Xbox Series X/S, PlayStation 4, Xbox One
2023	The Unliving	RocketBrush Studio	Microsoft Windows
2023	Headbangers: Rhythm Royale	Glee Cheese Studio	Microsoft Windows, Nintendo Switch, PlayStation 5, Xbox Series X/S
2024	What the Golf?	Triband	visionOS (Note: Published by Team17 USA. Other versions on Apple Arcade published by its predecessor The Label.)
2024	Border Bots VR	Paw Print Games, vTime	Microsoft Windows, Meta Quest 2, Meta Quest Pro, Meta Quest 3, PlayStation VR2
2024	Classified: France '44	Absolutely Games	Microsoft Windows, PlayStation 5, Xbox Series X/S
2024	Sweet Transit	Ernestas Norvaišas	Microsoft Windows
2024	Undead Inc.	Rightsized Games	Microsoft Windows
2024	Autopsy Simulator	Woodland Games	Microsoft Windows, PlayStation 5, Xbox Series X/S
2024	Conscript	Jordan Mochi, Catchweight Studio	Microsoft Windows, Nintendo Switch, PlayStation 4, PlayStation 5, Xbox One, Xbox Series X/S
2024	Thalassa: Edge of the Abyss	Sarepta Studio	Microsoft Windows
2024	Warcana	1000 Orks	Microsoft Windows
2024	Amber Isle	Ambertail Games	Microsoft Windows, Nintendo Switch
2025	Heroes of Hammerwatch II	Crackshell	Microsoft Windows
2025	Jumping Jazz Cats	Le Catnip Collective	Microsoft Windows
2025	Nice Day for Fishing	FusionPlay	Microsoft Windows, Nintendo Switch, PlayStation 5, Xbox Series X/S
2025	Date Everything!	Sassy Chap Games	Microsoft Windows, Nintendo Switch, Playstation 5, Xbox Series X/S
2025	Ritual of Raven	Spellgarden Games	Microsoft Windows, Nintendo Switch
2025	Sworn	Windwalk Games	Microsoft Windows, Nintendo Switch, PlayStation 5, Xbox Series X/S
2025	Worms Across Worlds	Behaviour Interactive	iOS, macOS, tvOS
2026	Sintopia	Piraknights Games	Microsoft Windows
2026	LumenTale: Memories of Trey	Beehive Studios	Microsoft Windows, Nintendo Switch, PlayStation 5, Xbox Series X/S
2026	Wardrum	Mopeful Games	Microsoft Windows
2026	Rogue Point	Crowbar Collective	Microsoft Windows
2026	Hell Let Loose: Vietnam	Expression Games	Microsoft Windows, PlayStation 5, Xbox Series X/S
2026	Silver Pines	Wych Elm	Microsoft Windows, Nintendo Switch, Nintendo Switch 2, PlayStation 5, Xbox Series X/S
2026	Hokko Spaces	Wonderscope Games	Microsoft Windows, Nintendo Switch
2026	Wraith Ops	Grassrootz Studio	Microsoft Windows
2026	Skinwalker: First Blood	Sismo Games	Microsoft Windows, Nintendo Switch, PlayStation 5, Xbox Series X/S
2026	What Goes Up	Bossa Games	Microsoft Windows, PlayStation 5, Xbox Series X/S
2027	Rover’s Tale	Observer Interactive	Microsoft Windows, Nintendo Switch 2, PlayStation 5, Xbox Series X/S
2027	Goblin Cleanup	Crisalu Games	Microsoft Windows, Nintendo Switch 2, PlayStation 5, Xbox Series X/S
2027	Westlanders	The Breach Studios	Microsoft Windows, PlayStation 5, Xbox Series X/S
2027	Worms: Galactic Tactics	Absolutely Games	Microsoft Windows, Nintendo Switch 2, PlayStation 5, Xbox Series X/S
2027	Holstin	Sonka	Microsoft Windows, Nintendo Switch, Nintendo Switch 2, PlayStation 4, PlayStation 5, Xbox One, Xbox Series X/S
2027	Greak 2: Alliance of the Storms	Navegante	Microsoft Windows, Nintendo Switch, PlayStation 5, Xbox Series X/S
2027	Little Prince Tyger	Saltitude Games	Microsoft Windows
TBA	Marauders	Small Impact Games	Microsoft Windows
TBA	Wardogs	Bulkhead	Microsoft Windows, Playstation 5, Xbox Series X/S
TBA	Eldritch Empathy	Lual Games	Microsoft Windows

=== Cancelled games ===
- Witchwood (circa 1994): An action-adventure game in the style of The Legend of Zelda or Al-Qadim: The Genie's Curse about a young hero's quest to destroy an evil witch.
- Allegiance (circa 1995): A first-person shooter game with integrated multiplayer features, later transformed into a third-person shooter before being cancelled.
- Rollcage (circa 1995): An off-road racing game with different types of rally vehicles and aggressive AI opponents, and is unrelated to the 1999 racing game also titled Rollcage.
- P.I.G. (circa 1996): A 3D platformer in the style of Super Mario 64 that featured different outfits for the main character and various minigames.
