= Alien Breed II: The Horror Continues =

1993 video game

- Developer(s): Team17
- Publisher(s): Team17
- Composer(s): Allister Brimble
- Platform(s): Amiga, Amiga CD32
- Release: 1993
- Genre(s): Run and gun
- Mode(s): Single-player, multiplayer

Alien Breed II: The Horror Continues is a run and gun video game released in 1993 by Team17 for the Amiga. The sequel to Alien Breed, it was available in both OCS/ECS and AGA versions. The AGA version of the game was also included as an extra in the Amiga CD32 version of Alien Breed: Tower Assault.

The game engine for Alien Breed II was largely rewritten to allow smoother scrolling between screens (the code for which was carried over to another Team17 project, Superfrog, a 2D platform game). The graphics were also vastly improved, as were the size and number of levels (there are 17 in AB-II compared to 6 in Alien Breed and 12 in Alien Breed Special Edition 92). The difficulty curve for AB-II is also steeper than that of its predecessor.

Alien Breed II is the only game in the series that gives players the option of choosing between four characters, each with their own specific strengths and weaknesses.

== Reception ==
Reception

Review scores
Publication	Score
Amiga Computing	92%
Amiga Force	88%
Amiga Format	80%
Amiga Power	81%
Amiga User International	91%

Alien Breed 2 received positive reviews from critics upon release. Amiga Computing Magazine praising the game as a "classic" due to its enhancements upon the original game. Amiga Action similarly described the game as "addictive" and a "quantum leap from its predecessors", although noting the game was highly difficult.
