= Alien Breed: Tower Assault =

1994 video game

- Developers: Team17; East Point Software (MS-DOS)
- Publisher: Team17
- Composer: Allister Brimble
- Platforms: Amiga 1200/Amiga 4000, Amiga CD32, MS-DOS
- Release: 1994
- Genre: Run and gun
- Modes: Single-player, multiplayer

Alien Breed: Tower Assault is a run and gun video game released in 1994 by Team17 for the Amiga, MS-DOS and the Amiga CD32. It is the third in the Alien Breed franchise, and like the first two games in the series, it is a science fiction-themed, top-down shooter.

== Story ==
A deep space barracks receives a distress signal from a science facility on an otherwise uninhabited planet. With no idea what to expect, a small troop of soldiers are sent to search the planet for survivors and neutralize any threat.

Once the ships near the facility, however, automated security lasers begin attacking, picking the ships off one by one. Only two soldiers survive, crash-landing in the outer perimeter of the facility. The player takes control of the characters there as the game begins.

== Gameplay ==
The game engine is a modified version of that used in Alien Breed II: The Horror Continues. One significant change is the inclusion of multiple exits for each level, making Alien Breed: Tower Assault much less linear than its predecessors—the blurb on the back of the box boasts more than 276 possible ways of completing the game.

Other improvements include Retreat Mode, which allows the player to shoot one's weapon and walk backwards at the same time, although at a slightly slower speed.

== Format variations ==
There are significant differences between the versions of the game released across different formats.

=== Amiga version ===
The Amiga version is spread across three 3.5" floppy disks in original protected form (disks are RobNorthen PDOS protected, each one using longtracks with 12 sectors per track and 980 KB per disk), while the cracked version in the AmigaDOS disk standard is spread over four disks. Once installed on a hard drive, either in ECS or AGA version, the executable checks from where the game is launched, and if it detects a launch from the hard drive, it will ask for the original Disk 1 (this is the copy protection when installed).

=== CD32 version ===
This version adds on a full motion video intro and the AGA version of The Horror Continues.

=== MS-DOS version ===
There were two versions of Tower Assault for MS-DOS: a floppy version and a CD-ROM version. Both were ported by East Point Software.

The floppy version is quite different from the Amiga release, since it doesn't retain the non-linear architecture of the levels.

The CD-ROM version retains the non-linear level structure as well as the FMV intro and outro sequences from the CD32 version. However, it does not include Alien Breed II, contrary to the claim on the packaging.
