= LumenTale: Memories of Trey =

2026 video game

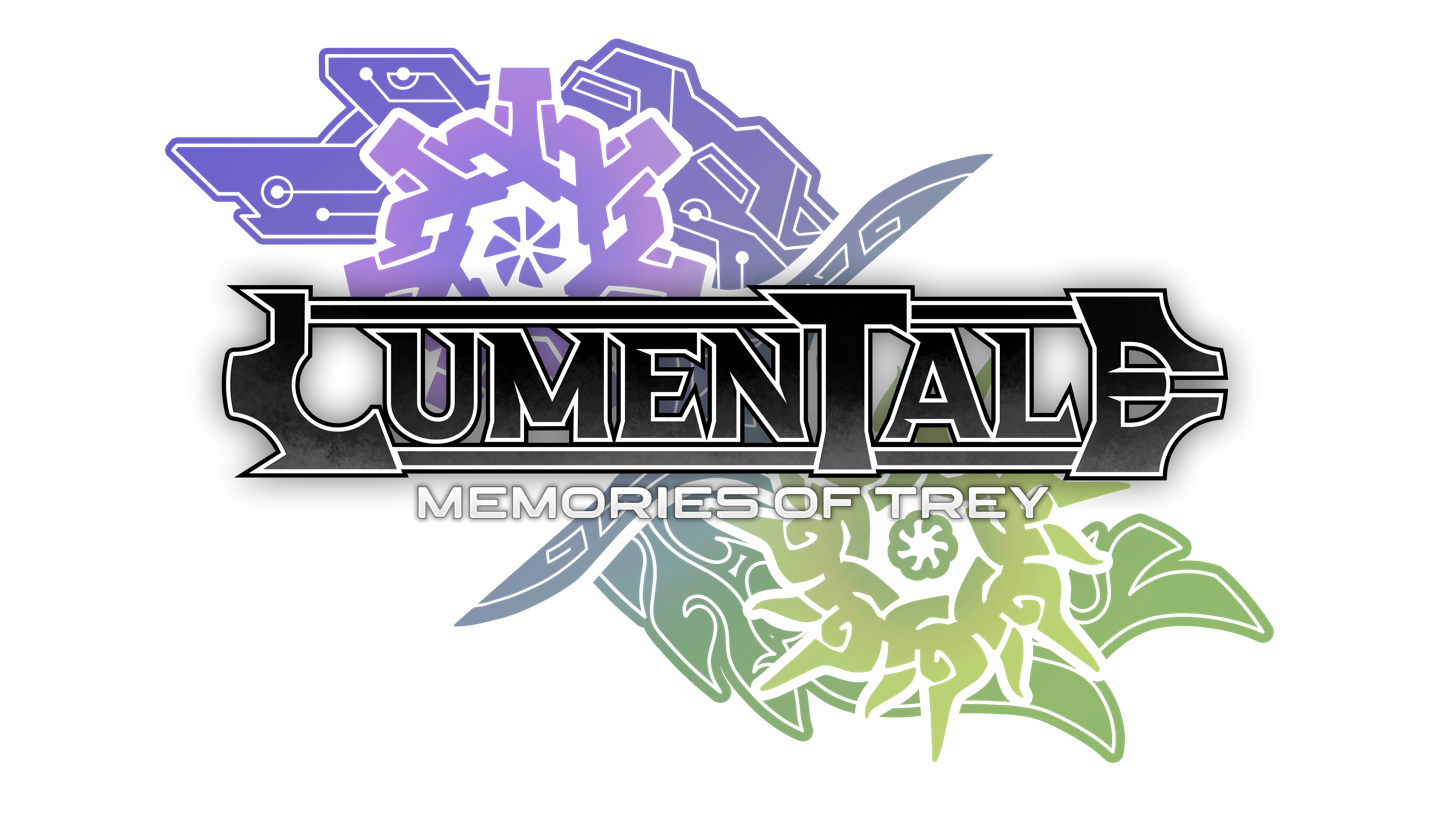
- Developer: Beehive Studios
- Publisher: Team17
- Director: Fabrizio Laborano
- Producer: Luca Genovese
- Designer: Pierluca Giannotti
- Programmer: Luca Todesca
- Artists: Gianmarco Bizzotto; Teo Casoli; Claudio Croci; Matteo Pachetti; Daniele Procopio; Elio Ubaldi
- Writer: Paolo Lella
- Composers: Tiziano Bellu; Giovanni Santolla; Lorenzo Varriano
- Engine: Unity
- Platforms: Microsoft Windows; Nintendo Switch; PlayStation 5; Xbox Series X/S
- Release: Windows, Switch; May 26, 2026; PS5, Xbox Series X/S; 2026
- Genre: Role-playing
- Modes: Single-player, multiplayer

LumenTale: Memories of Trey is a 2026 role-playing game developed by Beehive Studios and published by Team17. It released for Microsoft Windows and Nintendo Switch on May 26, 2026 with versions for PlayStation 5 and Xbox Series X/S set to release later in the same year. LumenTale: Memories of Trey is inspired by the classic Pokémon games, as well as other famous JRPG games such as Final Fantasy, Persona 5 and Xenoblade, with a story-driven approach to exploration in the game world.

== Gameplay ==
Trey, a cyborg who has lost his memory, is the main character of LumenTale: Memories of Trey and a promising Lumen, who are members of Squadrons who fight with Animon to protect people. Trey throws its Holoken at other Animon, either to catch them or to perform preemptive attacks that grants an advantage in battle. Furthermore, the Holoken can be imbued with the Animon elemental energy to perform a variety of interactions with the game's world. In battle, Trey can fight with up to 4 Animon on field, each Animon having their own Attribute that determines their specialities in battles.

Animon can also use their traits to imbue their attacks with special effects that vary wildly depending on their own affinities. The game also offers a variety of side-activities, such as Crafting, decorating the Anispace or exploring the majestic views of Talea to find out beautiful views.

The game is in 2.5D artstyle, similar to Octopath Traveler’s 2D-HD, but with more vibrant colors and detailed environments.

== Synopsis ==
Trey, the protagonist, is found passed out in the Scarlet Woods by Ales, one of the co-protagonists of the game, who brings him to safety in Iris Hamlet. After meeting Kapan (Ales’ uncle), Trey learns about his potential as a Lumen, and decides to follow that path to recover his memories.

=== Setting ===
The game is set in Talea, a region that suffered from a tremendous civil war in the past. The scars of said war are still present today, where the region is split in two main factions that followed the beliefs of the time: Mythos, leaning to tradition, and Logos, chasing progress.

=== Plot ===
After Trey learns the know-how of being a Lumen directly from Max, and defeats a powerful Animon in the Scarlet Woods, a calamity strikes and Iris Hamlet gets destroyed by a powerful Animon. After saving the city and rescuing Nada, Trey decides that it's best for him to travel through Talea to find clues about himself, and sets off with Ales to the start of their journey.

== Development ==
LumenTale: Memories of Trey is the realization of Beehive Studios previous works into a completely new IP with a fully-fledged monster collector game. The team decided to raise funds for developing the game through a Kickstarter campaign that raised €140,423 from 2,914 backers, amounting to €148,921 if including sources from other crowdfunding platforms.

Originally scheduled for release in December 2024, the game was then delayed to May 26, 2026. During the development of LumenTale: Memories of Trey, Beehive Studios signed a publishing deal with Team17, the publisher of Monster Sanctuary, who helped the studio with support during the game development and release.

LumenTale: Memories of Trey was developed with the intention of creating a different kind of monster collector games, more centered towards plot, lore and old-school RPG mechanics. The developers brought various influences from a variety of games and media to the game, to create a world with depth that could create immersion for the players. The game's plot, in particular, draws influences from a variety of other series such as Persona, Undertale and Xenoblade.

The soundtrack, entirely composed from the developer's team, features more than 140 songs and features a song from Emi Evans as the ending credits track.

== Reception ==
Reception

Aggregate scores
Aggregator	Score
Metacritic	(NS) 78/100 (PC) 79/100
OpenCritic	71% recommend (Note: Based on 20 reviews)

Review scores
Publication	Score
Try Hard	9/10
The Games Machine	8.5/10
Gamer Social Club	8.5/10
Destructoid	8/10
Siliconera	8/10
Game8	8/10
Nindie Spotlight	7.7/10
Dual Shockers	7.5/10
Checkpoint Gaming	7.5/10
Multiplayer.it	7.5/10
Gameliner	3/5

=== Post-release ===
LumenTale: Memories of Trey received "generally favorable" reviews for the Nintendo Switch and the Windows version, according to the review aggregator website Metacritic. Fellow review aggregator OpenCritic assessed that the game received strong approval, being recommended by 71% of critics.
