= Body Blows =

1993 video game

- Developer: Team17
- Publisher: Team17
- Producer: Martyn James Brown
- Designers: Cedric McMillan Jr. Danny Burke
- Programmer: Cedric McMillan Jr.
- Artist: Danny Burke
- Composers: Allister Brimble; Danny Burke
- Platforms: Amiga, MS-DOS
- Release: March 1993
- Genre: Fighting
- Modes: Single-player, multiplayer

Body Blows is a 1993 fighting game developed and published by Team17 for the Amiga. A version for MS-DOS followed the same year. The game has been compared to Street Fighter II. It was followed by Body Blows Galactic and Ultimate Body Blows.

== Gameplay ==
The game follows the formula of the Street Fighter series. The player competes against each opponent in best-of-three matches. Each fighter has their own set of standard attack moves and special moves. Due to most Amiga joysticks of the time having one single fire button, the controls for special moves are largely simplified: one special move per character is performed by keeping the fire button pressed while holding still, while others are performed by moving in one of the eight directions and pressing the fire button. There are no combos or throws. Unlike Street Fighter and other similar games such as Mortal Kombat, blocking is performed by holding the fire button while moving away from the opponent.

One characteristic gameplay feature is that, when an opponent is knocked down, the fire button of the other player is locked until the opponent gets back up and moves. This mode was labelled mercy when it became optional in versions of the game following the original Amiga retail release.

There are three modes of play in Body Blows. One player arcade mode allows the player selects one characters and battles all the others in sequence until the final showdown against Max. Two player mode allows two players to take control of joysticks and fight each other using a character they desire. Tournament mode lets four or eight players play a tournament against each other.

There are 11 characters in Body Blows. In one player mode, the player can choose from the four characters to play as, namely Danny, Junior, Nik and Lo Ray. In other modes, players can select from 10 of the characters in the game.

== Release ==
In summer 1993, a few months after the game was released, Team17 published an updated version of the program disk for Amiga computers. The update increases in-game speed, adds shadows to the characters and makes all the non-boss characters selectable in story mode. It also includes a few gameplay tweaks, such as an option for not locking the fire button after a fighter is knocked down and allowing the time limit setting to also apply during the match against the T-17. This upgrade was only available for a fee to owners of the retail version, who were required to send the original boot disk via mail to Team17.

=== Amiga AGA version ===
With the release of Ultimate Body Blows in 1994, an updated version of the first Body Blows was released for the Amiga with AGA chipset, such as the A1200 and A4000. This version is installable to a hard drive and includes all the updated features from Ultimate Body Blows, such as entirely redrawn backgrounds, slight changes in the movesets and the ability to stun the opponent. Likewise, the sprites for the characters Dan and Junior were updated to the ones first used in Body Blows Galactic.

== Reception ==
In the United Kingdom, it was the top-selling Amiga game in March 1993.

It received the following reviews at the time:

- "The best beat-em up money can buy" - 91% - CU Amiga
- "Not as good as the console sf2, but it's a very close thing" - 87% - Amiga Format
- "If you thought [Street Fighter II] was the business, think again" - 92% - The One
- "A true corker of a game with undeniable influences" - 89% - Amiga Power
