= Body Blows Galactic =

1993 video game

- Developer: Team17
- Publisher: Team17
- Producer: Martyn Brown
- Designer: Danny Burke
- Programmer: Cedric McMillan Jr.
- Artists: Danny Burke; Rico Holmes
- Composer: Allister Brimble
- Series: Body Blows
- Platform: Amiga
- Release: 1993
- Genre: Fighting game
- Modes: Single-player, multiplayer

Body Blows Galactic is a fighting game developed and published by Team17 in 1993 for the Amiga computers. It is a sequel to 1992's Body Blows. Opponents and background graphics from both games were later merged into the compilation release Ultimate Body Blows.

== Gameplay ==
Junior vs. Kai-Ti

After winning the global martial arts tournament, Danny and Junior decide to take the universe further and challenge the meanest and toughest in an interplanetary competition to become the ultimate galactic warrior.

The gameplay system is the same as in the original Body Blows game. The game features single- and two-player modes, as well as an eight-player tournament mode.

There are 12 different playable fighters from six worlds, and no bosses.

== Development ==
A team of six people developed the game for about nine months. A slightly enhanced version was created for the AGA based Amiga 1200 which has several changes like more colorful backdrops and improved sound effects (by Steven and Gary Nicholas) and music.

== Reception ==
Body Blows Galactic received mostly favorable reviews. Amiga Computing gave it a score of 93% and called it the best beat'em up game for Amiga. In a special comparison in Amiga Action, the game got a score of 84%, winning or drawing in the category "Atmosphere" and "Two Player Game" against Mortal Kombat and Elfmania. A dissenting review in CU Amiga gave it only a 57%, criticizing unbalanced characters, saying that while Warra, Lazer and Dino are ineffective, the fast Kai-Ti seems invincible. Other reviews gave the game the ratings 86% in ACAR, 90% in Amiga Dream, 91% in Amiga Force, 88% in Amiga Format, 83% in Amiga Joker, 72% in Amiga Power and 87% in The One. Matt Broughton of The One rated the "lovely in every way" Kai-Ti as the most attractive Amiga fighting game character in a 1995 article.
