= Ultimate Body Blows =

1994 video game

- Developer: Team17
- Publisher: Team17
- Producer: Martyn James Brown
- Designers: Cedric McMillan Jr. Danny Burke
- Programmer: Cedric McMillan Jr.
- Artist: Danny Burke
- Composer: Allister Brimble
- Series: Body Blows
- Platforms: CD32, MS-DOS
- Release: 1994
- Genre: Fighting
- Mode: Up to 2 players simultaneously

Ultimate Body Blows is a 1994 fighting game for Amiga CD32 and MS-DOS. It is an amalgamation of Body Blows and Body Blows Galactic released in 1993 by Team17, with all the characters and most of the stages from both games, and using the interface of the first game.

== Reception ==
Stephen Bradley of Amiga Format gave Ultimate Body Blows a score of 90%, praising the varied participants, but criticizing the price point.
