= Debbie Bestwick =

British entrepreneur (born 1970)

Debbie Bestwick MBE
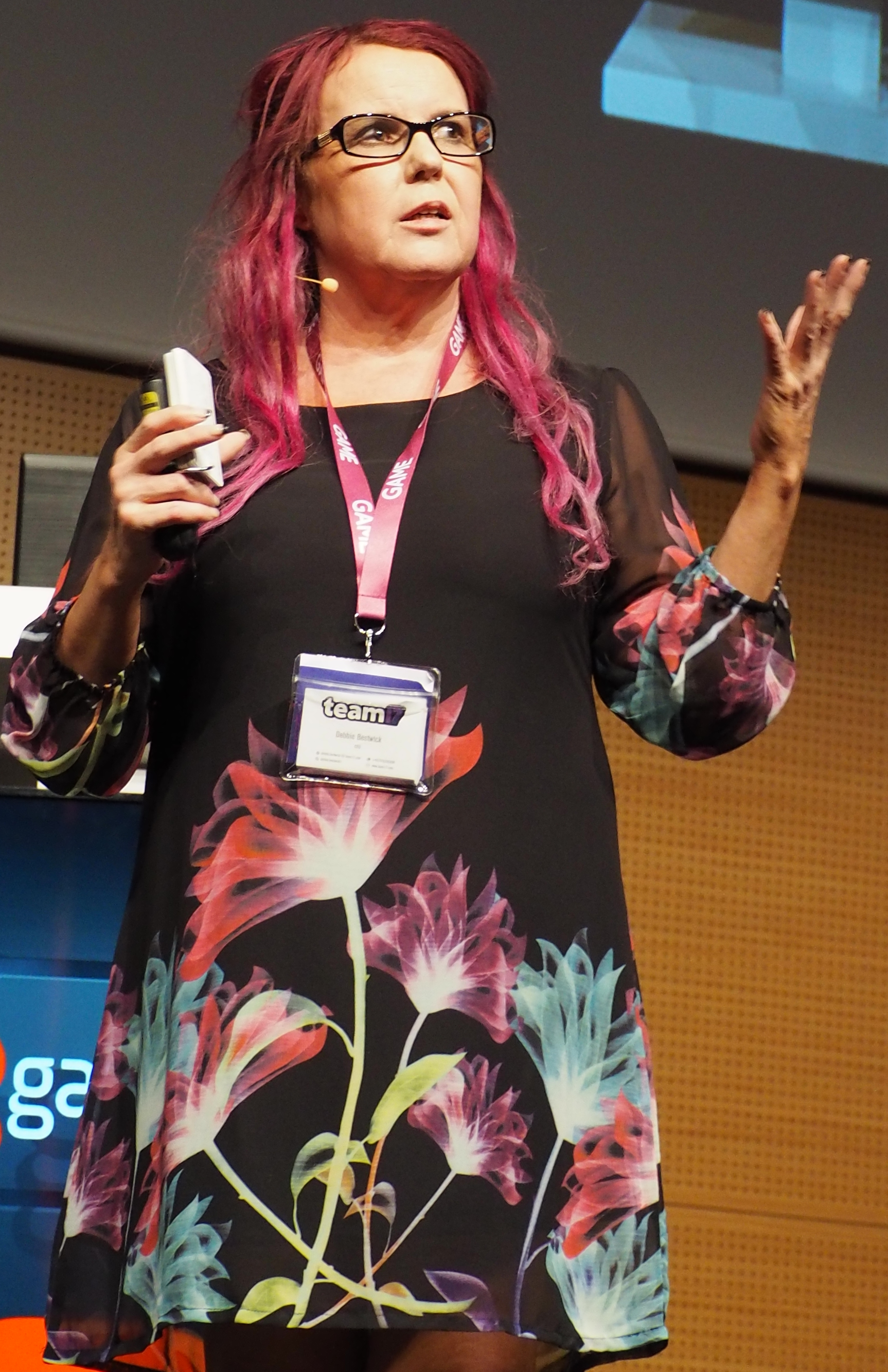
- Bestwick in 2018
- Born: Deborah Jayne Bestwick; 7 March 1970 (age 56); United Kingdom
- Occupation: Chief executive officer (formerly)
- Years active: 1986–present
- Known for: Team17
- Awards: See § Accolades

Deborah Jayne Bestwick MBE (born 7 March 1970) is a British entrepreneur. Following a short career in video game retail, she was part of the December 1990 merger between the British video game publisher 17-Bit Software and the Swedish developer Team 7, forming Team17. She was the company's co-manager until buying out the other founders' stakes in 2010 to become chief executive officer (CEO). Team17 went public in May 2018, earning Bestwick £50 million in windfall gain. She was awarded various accolades related to the video game industry between 2015 and 2017 and was pronounced a Member of the Most Excellent Order of the British Empire in June 2016. She stepped down as CEO of Team17 in January 2024.

== Career ==
Deborah Jayne Bestwick was born on 7 March 1970. She attended Holgate School in Hucknall. Bestwick gained interest in video games at the age of twelve, when she played Football Manager on her brother's ZX Spectrum. As she approached her A-level examinations at the age of sixteen, she got a part-time job at a Nottingham video game store. Bestwick described the idea of working with video games as "heaven" and did not return to finish her exams. Shortly into her job, the store's owner stepped down and had Bestwick take over the business. She managed the store for twelve months before negotiating its sale to the entrepreneur Michael Robinson and its integration into his UK-wide computer retail chain, Microbyte, which was headquartered in Wakefield. At Microbyte, Bestwick was repeatedly promoted, eventually becoming promotions manager and later sales manager.

In 1990, her co-worker Martyn Brown conceived the idea of converting 17-Bit Software, a video game publisher also owned by Robinson, into a venture that acted as both a publisher and developer. He would act as the project manager and hire a Swedish three-man team from Olofström, known as Team 7, as developers. Team 7 had been formed earlier that year through interactions between Brown and the Swedish programmer Andreas Tadic and at the time consisted of Tadic, Rico Holmes, and Peter Tuleby. After Robinson agreed, Brown became the project manager, with Bestwick given the role of "commercial support" for 17-Bit Software. The two studios soon agreed to formally merge and created Team17 on 7 December 1990. Bestwick and Brown ran Team17's daily business until she bought out Brown and Robinson in 2010 to become the company's chief executive officer (CEO) and sole director. In May 2018, Bestwick and Chris Bell, who she hired as Team17's chairman, launched an initial public offering for Team17. The company was listed on the London Stock Exchange's Alternative Investment Market, and Bestwick received around £50 million in windfall gain for the sale of half of her shares.

Eurogamer reported in February 2022 that Team17 employees held mixed feelings towards Bestwick. Some staffers stated that she caused a presenteeism culture at the company and frequently passed down pressure from external partners or a falling share price to employees and caused individual persons to leave meetings in tears. One employee said that she ignored harassment. Bestwick stepped down as CEO of Team17 to be replaced by Steve Bell on 1 January 2024, to transition to a non-executive role while remaining on the board of directors.

== Personal life ==
Bestwick is single with two children and resides in the countryside north of Nottingham.

== Accolades ==
In April 2015, at the 2015 MCV Awards, the video game magazine MCV named Bestwick "Person of the Year". At the first Women in Games conference in September 2015, also organised by MCV, Bestwick was presented with the "Hall of Fame" award. At the second iteration, held in May 2016, Bestwick won "Businesswoman of the Year". At the 2016 Birthday Honours, Bestwick was pronounced a Member of the Most Excellent Order of the British Empire (MBE) for her services in the video game industry. At the 2017 Golden Joystick Awards, Bestwick was awarded in the category for "Outstanding Contribution to the UK Games Industry".
