= Overdrive =

Overdrive may refer to:

== Organizations ==
- OverDrive, Inc., a digital distributor of entertainment media
  - OverDrive Media Console, a media player developed by OverDrive, Inc.
- Overdrive PC, a subsidiary of Velocity Micro

== Technology ==
- Overdrive (mechanics), part of an automobile transmission
- FIRST Overdrive, the 2008 game for the FIRST Robotics Competition
- Response Time Compensation also known as "Overdrive", as used in LCD displays
- AMD OverDrive, a utility software for CPUs

=== Electronics ===
- Intel 80486 OverDrive, a CPU specifically designed for personal computer upgrades
- Pentium OverDrive, a CPU specifically designed for personal computer upgrades
- Overdrive, forcing amplifier output past maximum; see Distortion (music)

== Art, entertainment and media ==
=== Fictional entities ===
- Overdrive (character), a Marvel Comics supervillain
- Overdrive, a fictional film in the video game Stuntman: Ignition
- Overdrive, a fictional weapon in the video game Rez

=== Film and television ===
- MTV Overdrive, an MTV broadband video channel
- Overdrive (1997 film), an American film
- Overdrive (2017 film), French film
- Over Drive (film), 2018 Japanese film
- OverDrive (radio show), Canadian sports television show

=== Games and toys ===
- Over Drive, an arcade racing game by Konami
- Overdrive (Transformers), a part of the Transformers toy line
- Overdrive (1984 video game), a 1984 computer racing game for the BBC Micro and Acorn Electron
- Overdrive (1993 video game), a 1993 video game
- Overdrive, an attack form in the video game Final Fantasy X
- Overdrive, a common gameplay element in the Rock Band series
- 80's Overdrive, a 2020 racing video game by Insane Code

=== Music ===
==== Groups ====
- Overdrive (band), a Serbian hardcore punk/metalcore band
- Bachman–Turner Overdrive, a Canadian rock group

==== Albums ====
- Overdrive (Fastlane album), a 2007 album from Surrey based alternative rock band Fastlane
- Overdrive (Shonen Knife album), a 2014 release by Japanese band Shonen Knife
- Overdrive (EP), a 2023 EP by I.M
- Overdrive, a 2013 release by Belgian singer Natalia

==== Songs ====
- "Overdrive" (Katy Rose song), 2003
- "Overdrive" (Ofenbach song), 2023
- "Overdrive" (Ola song), 2010
- "Overdrive" (Post Malone song), 2023
- "Overdrive", a 2010 song by Airbourne from No Guts. No Glory.
- "Overdrive", a 2014 song by Calvin Harris and Ummet Ozcan from Motion
- "Overdrive", a 2004 song by Client from City
- "Overdrive", a 2021 song by Conan Gray from Superache (Japanese edition)
- "Overdrive", a 2022 song by Drake from Honestly, Nevermind
- "Overdrive", a 1995 song by Eraserheads from Cutterpillow
- "Overdrive", a 2020 song by Firewind from Firewind
- "Overdrive", a 2002 song by Foo Fighters from One by One
- "Overdrive", a 2022 song by Maggie Rogers from Surrender
- "Overdrive", a 1977 song by Riot from Rock City
- "Overdrive", a 1968 song by the Steve Miller Band from Sailor
- "Overdrive", a 2023 song by the South Korean Group WEi from Love Pt. 3: Eternally
- "Stops at the Affected Area and Immediately Dissolves ~ Lunatic Udongein", known by English speakers as "Overdrive", by Japanese doujin music circle IOSYS

=== Publications ===
- Overdrive (magazine), an Indian monthly automotive magazine
- Over Drive (manga), a 2005 manga, adapted into an anime in 2007

== Other uses ==
- Operation Overdrive (transportation), a public transportation plan for the Medway Towns, Kent, England
- Impact Wrestling Over Drive, a professional wrestling event
- Overdrive, a neckbreaker move in professional wrestling
