= Hell Let Loose: Vietnam =

2026 video game

- Developer: Expression Games
- Publisher: Team17
- Engine: Unreal Engine 5
- Platforms: PlayStation 5; Windows; Xbox Series X/S
- Release: August 13, 2026
- Genres: Tactical shooter; First-person shooter
- Mode: Multiplayer

Hell Let Loose: Vietnam is a multiplayer tactical first-person shooter set in the Vietnam War, currently in development at the English studio Expression Games. The game was developed for PlayStation 5, Windows and Xbox Series X/S and it was released on August 13th 2026.

Hell Let Loose: Vietnam is playable through Steam, Microsoft Store and Epic Games Store upon release. It got positive reviews on Metacritic.

== Gameplay ==
According to the developer, the "basic gameplay" of HLLV has "remained true" to the mechanics of the game Hell Let Loose. Game rounds are once again played from a first-person perspective between two teams of up to 50 players each. Reflecting the changed theme from Hell Let Loose—the Vietnam War—the two teams represent the United States Armed Forces and the troops of North Vietnam, the Vietnamese People's Army, and the Viet Cong. Crossplay between PC and console players is supported at launch. Hell Let Loose: Vietnam features a tutorial to make it easier for newcomers.

At launch, Hell Let Loose: Vietnam includes six maps. Additional locations will be released with updates. HLLV's maps are not exact recreations of historical battlefields, but are inspired by them and, according to the developers, are based on "decisive moments of the war," such as Operation Starlite and Operation Piranha. Unlike Hell Let Loose, HLLV includes helicopters and boats. While only the US team has helicopters, the construction of tunnel systems is reserved for players playing as North Vietnamese soldiers. Since each map features "extensive river networks", both teams have boats as controlling these can be crucial to success, according to the developer. The maps also include jungles, rice paddies, beaches, and hills. The publisher emphasizes that it's not individual performance, reflected in the Kill–death ratio, that determines team success, but rather communication and coordination are rewarded, and the game mechanics favor this style of play.

Hell Let Loose: Vietnam is said to offer 19 skill classes, according to game journalists.

== Development ==
Hell Let Loose: Vietnam was announced on August 20, 2025, with a trailer for 2026.

According to the Manchester-based development studio, the studio chose the Vietnam War as their theme because it "hadn't been featured in any major game title for many years." Team 17 emphasizes that the development of HLLV will not be detrimental to the further development of Hell Let Loose, as a new development team has been established alongside the existing one. The game will run on Unreal Engine 5 and according to Team17, a large portion of the codebase that has existed since Hell Let Loose was "reworked from the ground up" during development. An open beta phase will be held prior to release.

Weapons held by the Royal Armouries were used for reference by the game developers.
