= Golf With Your Friends 2 =

Upcoming casual golf video game

- Developer: Radical Forge
- Publisher: Team17
- Engine: Unity
- Platforms: Nintendo Switch 2; PlayStation 5; Windows; Xbox Series X/S
- Release: WW: 2027
- Genres: Casual, golf video game
- Modes: Single-player, multiplayer

Golf With Your Friends 2 is an upcoming casual golf video game developed by Radical Forge and published by Team17. It is a sequel to Golf With Your Friends, and is set to be released on Windows, Nintendo Switch 2, PlayStation 5, and Xbox Series X/S in 2027.

== Gameplay ==
Golf With Your Friends 2 will feature cross-platform play.

== Development and release ==
Golf With Your Friends 2 was announced in December 2024. The UK-based video game developer Radical Forge replaced Australian studio Blacklight Interactive, the developer of Golf With Your Friends, as the new developer, with Team17 returning to publish the game. The game was scheduled to be released via early access in 2025 for Windows. However, it was announced in July 2025 that the game would skip early access. Initially slated for a 2026 release on Nintendo Switch 2, PlayStation 5, Windows and Xbox Series X/S, it was announced in November 2026 that the game would be delayed to 2027.
