= The Escapists 2 =

2017 strategy role-playing video game

- Developers: Mouldy Toof Studios; Team17
- Publisher: Team17
- Designer: James Witcomb
- Engine: Unity
- Platforms: Linux macOS; PlayStation 4 Windows; Xbox One; Nintendo Switch iOS; Android
- Release: Linux, macOS, PlayStation 4, Windows, Xbox One; 22 August 2017; Nintendo Switch; 11 January 2018 iOS, Android; 31 January 2019
- Genres: Strategy, role-playing
- Modes: Single-player, multiplayer

The Escapists 2 is a strategy role-playing video game developed by Mouldy Toof Studios and published by Team17. It is the sequel to The Escapists (2015) and it was released worldwide for Linux, macOS, PlayStation 4, Windows, and Xbox One in August 2017. Nintendo Switch and mobile phones versions were released in 2018 and 2019, both iOS and Android respectively.

== Gameplay ==
In the game, players assume control of an inmate from a top-down perspective. The inmate must follow daily routines in the prison while completing quests for fellow inmates and seeking out opportunities to escape. Missing routines results in the prison's security level increasing; at higher security levels, more guards patrol the prison, dogs sniff out contraband items stored by inmates, and, at the highest security level, a total lockdown occurs in which all inmates must return to their cells. A lockdown can also be caused by damaging the prison or misplacing guards' keys. The Escapists 2 features a crafting system which allows players to craft items like shovels, stun guns, and dummies to confuse guards. Once the player character is caught, all contraband items in the inventory are lost and the inmate is put into solitary confinement. Comparing to its predecessors, the game has a larger variety of prisons, including prisoner transport vehicles and incarceration facilities set in space. There are also more customization options for the player character. The game features an expanded combat system which allows players to lock onto targets, block and perform light and heavy attacks.

The game features both local and online cooperative multiplayer. There are some unique escapes that require multiplayer to unlock where up to four players can assist each other when escaping prison. The competitive multiplayer pits between two and four players against each other and the player who breaks out from the confinement facility fastest wins the game.

== Development ==
Mouldy Toof Studios created The Escapists 2 in conjunction with Team17. The team listened to feedback from players who have played the first game and identified multiplayer as the most requested feature. Since the first game's code would have needed to be substantially rewritten to incorporate such features, the team decided to create a new game instead. The team wanted to introduce something new to players. Therefore, many systems were expanded to become more complex, and the prisons featured in the game are multi-storied.

Team17 announced the game on October 3, 2016. It was released for Microsoft Windows, PlayStation 4 and Xbox One on August 22, 2017. Team17 then released the game on Nintendo Switch on January 16, 2018. The game was released for iOS and Android on January 31, 2019 as The Escapists 2: Pocket Breakout. Several downloadable content packs were released for the game. These include "Big Top Breakout", "Dungeons and Duct Tape" and "Wicked Ward", all of which introduce a new prison map. Sold Out served as the game's distributor for the retail version of the game for PC, PS4 and Xbox One.

== Reception ==
Reception

Aggregate score
Aggregator	Score
Metacritic	PC: 75/100; PS4: 75/100; XONE: 77/100; NS: 73/100

Review scores
Publication	Score
Game Informer	7/10
Nintendo Life	8/10
Nintendo World Report	7/10
Pocket Gamer	3.5/5
Igromania	7.5/10

The game received generally positive reviews from critics according to review aggregator website Metacritic. The Russian magazine Igromania praised the game's humor, characters, variety of maps, and the option to play multiplayer, while somewhat criticizing the interface, specifically the dialog boxes.

== Sequel ==
A sequel titled The Escapists 3 is set to be released by Team17 in 2027.
