= Alien Breed (video game) =

1991 video game

- Developer: Team17
- Publishers: Team17; MicroLeague
- Producer: Martyn Brown
- Designer: Rico Holmes
- Programmers: Andreas Tadic; Peter Tuleby
- Artist: Rico Holmes
- Composer: Allister Brimble
- Platforms: Amiga, CD32, MS-DOS, Android, iOS, PlayStation 3, Vita, PlayStation Mobile
- Release: 1991: Amiga; 1993: MS-DOS
- Genre: Run and gun
- Modes: Single-player, multiplayer

Alien Breed is a top down run and gun video game released in 1991 by Team17 for the Amiga and later in 1993 by MicroLeague for MS-DOS. The game is the first in the Alien Breed series.

Alien Breed is based on the Alien films, specifically Aliens, and also on the 8-bit-era games Laser Squad and Paradroid as well as the Gauntlet arcade game.

== Gameplay ==
The flamethrower can be purchased with collected credits. On the top right is an Intex terminal, and two keys and an ammunition clip are scattered in the rooms on the right and above.

Players must find the lift down to the next level, occasionally setting the self-destruct sequence to blow up the level above them. The players collect or purchase a variety of weapons from the space station's computer terminals. In some versions of the game, these so-called Intex terminals provide additional features such as a clone of the classic video game Pong. Credits found on the ground have to be saved for these weapons and other enhancements, each giving the players an edge over the gradually more and more powerful alien forces. In advanced levels, players are occasionally trapped in enclosed spaces with huge boss aliens.

== Story ==
In the year 2191, humanity has rapidly expanded into space from an overpopulated Earth, kept in an uneasy peace by the Inter-Planetary Corps (IPC) peacekeeping force. ISRC-4 is a top-secret research facility orbiting the massive planetary gas giant Gianor. The station suddenly stops transmitting all signals across federation wavebands. Command initially suspects a local colonist rebellion. Two elite IPC officers, Johnson and Stone, who return from a routine patrol, are sent to investigate a research station. They dock at the station to find out what happened, only to discover it has been overrun by a hostile, monstrous swarm of alien lifeforms rather than rebellious humans.

== Release ==
Team17 made an "intro disk" available, containing a short animated introductory sequence with on-screen narration which follows events leading into the start of the game. After the introduction is finished, the player is prompted for disk one of the game, effectively making the introduction disk "disk zero". Team17 produced a similar introduction disk for Superfrog, animated by Eric W. Schwartz, although this was included with the retail edition of the game.

== Reception ==
=== Amiga ===
Reception

Review scores
Publication	Score
ACE	875/1000
Amiga Action	87%
Amiga Computing	91%
Amiga Format	74%
Amiga Power	82%
Computer and Video Games	91% (Amiga); 40% (DOS)
GamesMaster	70%
Games-X	5/5
PC Gamer (US)	75% (DOS)
Zero	91%
CU Amiga	90%
The One	90%

Alien Breed was released to generally favorable reviews. CU Amiga wrote that "Team17 have come up with a winner".

=== MS-DOS ===
The MS-DOS port's reception was mixed. PC Gamer US described the gameplay's variety as lacking and the sound effects as "shallow and tinny", with problems using the Pro Audio Spectrum sound card to be expected, but favorably compared it to Sega Genesis games and called it a "solid shooter [with] plenty of high-octane fun." Computer Gaming World criticized the "asinine" copy protection, but said that it is still a good action title for those who like their play quick and simple". The magazine stated in the next issue that while "right at home at the local arcade or any cartridge game machine", the DOS version of Alien Breed "has fallen behind in the tech race". Citing the "European" use of mission codes instead of save games and "pretty" but shallow gameplay, the reviewer unfavorably compared it to Doom, with "an almost identical (somewhat tired) premise" but of which "the execution makes all the difference". Despite the good graphics and "fast-paced" action, he concluded that Alien Breed was "not suitable for the average computer gamer on this continent", but might be for the "less demanding player" or one who wanted a Nintendo.

In a critical review, Computer and Video Games pointed to the port's bugs such as the screen flickering. The more serious bugs included not being able to buy weapons from any Intex terminal and the game crashing nearly a quarter of an hour into it. The reviewer concluded that the bugs overshadowed what was otherwise a faithful conversion of an Amiga classic.

James V. Trunzo reviewed Alien Breed in White Wolf #45 (July, 1994), giving it a final evaluation of "Good" and stated that "Alien Breed isn't the cutting edge of science fiction action gaming, but I don't think it's trying to be. It's like a watered-down version of EA's superior Space Hulk. For the money, it's a fun beer 'n' pretzels game that lets you vent hostilities on nasty critters - and you can even do it with a friend!"

== Legacy ==
Alien Breed Special Edition '92 was an expanded version, published in 1992, at budget price. It was hugely popular, staying in the British software charts for more than a year. It also featured a film trailer-style advert for Team17's upcoming Superfrog, which was unusual at the time. As well as being released on the Amiga, this version of the game was also released on the Amiga CD32 in a double-pack with Qwak.

Both the original and the Special Edition did well enough to merit further sequels, almost all of which have been commercial and critical successes.

The player characters in this game and its sequel were named Johnson and Stone. By the third game (Alien Breed: Tower Assault), the player characters were named John and Nash. In keeping with the Aliens theme, a female voiceover (the voice of Lynette Reade) provided warnings and other messages to the players.

In 2012, a port of Alien Breed for smartphones and tablets was released for iOS and Android, to very favourable reviews.
