= Golf With Your Friends =

2020 casual video game

- Developer: Blacklight Interactive
- Publisher: Team17
- Director: Kevin Karthew
- Producers: Chris Chester; Daniel Martin
- Designer: Matt Burnill
- Programmer: Andrew MacKinnon
- Artist: Phil Brown
- Composer: Kriss Wiltshire
- Engine: Unity
- Platforms: Linux; macOS; Nintendo Switch; PlayStation 4; Windows; Xbox One; Stadia
- Release: Linux, macOS, Switch, PS4, Windows, Xbox One: WW: 19 May 2020; Stadia: WW: 14 April 2022
- Genres: Casual, sports
- Modes: Single-player, multiplayer

Golf With Your Friends is a golf video game by Australian developer Blacklight Interactive and published by Team17. The game started in early access on Steam on 30 January 2016 and fully released on 19 May 2020 for Linux, macOS, Nintendo Switch, PlayStation 4, Windows, and Xbox One, and on Google Stadia on 14 April 2022.

== Gameplay ==
A screenshot from the game.

Golf With Your Friends allows up to 12 players to play in 13 levels containing 18 holes each, 234 in total. The game features a level editor and ball customizations. A featured The Escapists and Worms map are available in the game.

== Development and release ==
Golf With Your Friends was developed by Brisbane-based video game studio Blacklight Interactive, which consists of three people, and published by Team17. The game started in early access on 30 January 2016. It fully released on 19 May 2020 for Microsoft Windows, Nintendo Switch, PlayStation 4 and Xbox One.

== Reception ==
Reception

Aggregate scores
Aggregator	Score
Metacritic	NS: 69/100; PS4: 69/100; XONE: 68/100
OpenCritic	38% recommend

Review scores
Publication	Score
Game Informer	7.5/10
Hardcore Gamer	2.5/5
Nintendo Life	6/10

Golf with Your Friends received "mixed or average" reviews, according to review aggregator Metacritic. Fellow review aggregator OpenCritic assessed that the game received fair approval, being recommended by 38% of critics.

J. Brodie Shirey of Screen Rant gave the game four stars out of maximum five, "Excellent". While he admitted Golf with Your Friends might have "minor faults", he described the game as "fun" and "colorful". He also praised the in-game physics was "quite well for the most part", feeling satisfied with the varieties in terms of courses and game types.

A.J. Maciejewski wrote a review at Videochums.com based on his knowledge of the Xbox One version, rating 4.9 points of possible 10 to the game, which was the lowest score the game received. He thought the game was "promising", but he criticised the "extremely barebones" gameplay, a lack of characters and glitches the game had.

== Sequel ==
A sequel, Golf With Your Friends 2, is scheduled to be released in 2027.
