= Hokko Life =

2022 video game

- Developer: Wonderscope
- Publisher: Team17
- Engine: Unity
- Platforms: Windows; Nintendo Switch; PlayStation 4; Xbox One; Amazon Luna
- Release: 27 September 2022
- Genre: Social simulation
- Mode: Single-player

Hokko Life is a 2022 social simulation video game developed by Swedish studio Wonderscope and published by Team17. It was released for Windows, Nintendo Switch, PlayStation 4 and Xbox One on 27 September 2022.

== Gameplay ==
Gameplay is generally compared to that of Animal Crossing. The player is given the ability to customize the look of in game items.

== Development ==
Work on the game began in 2017 by Wonderscope Games. Early versions of the game were compared to Transport Tycoon by the developer, with the game later shifting to resemble a social simulation game like the Animal Crossing series as development progressed. Unity was used as a game engine.

In 2020 it was announced that Team17 would publish the game.

On 2 June 2021, Hokko Life was published as an early access title on Steam. At the start of the early access period Kotaku Australia claimed that the game was too buggy to be playable though by launch PC Gamer only noted graphical issues with the UI. While in early access, a version of the game for Amazon Luna was released on January 6, 2022.

The full version released for Windows, alongside versions for Nintendo Switch, PlayStation 4, Xbox One, and Amazon Luna occurred on September 27, 2022.

== Reception ==
Reception

Aggregate score
| Aggregator | Score |
|---|---|
| Metacritic | PC: 54/100; NS: 62/100; PS4: 73/100 |

Review scores
| Publication | Score |
|---|---|
| Nintendo Life | 5/10 |
| PC Gamer (US) | 48/100 |
| TouchArcade | 3.5/5 |
| Sportskeeda | 6/10 |

Hokko Life received "mixed or average" reviews according to Metacritic.

PC Gamer noted that the game could run on lower end hardware, while critiquing graphical quality on lower settings, as well as UI issues in the game.

TouchArcade praised the creativity options, while noting poor performance on Switch hardware.
