= X2 (video game) =

1996 video game

- Developer: Team17
- Publishers: EU: Ocean Software; JP: Capcom
- Platform: PlayStation
- Release: EU: November 1996; JP: August 1997
- Genre: Side-scrolling shooter
- Modes: Single player, multiplayer

X2 is an arcade-style side-scrolling shoot 'em up developed by Team17 and published by Ocean Software in Europe in 1996 and by Capcom in Japan in 1997 for the PlayStation. Released during the Team17-Ocean collaboration era of video games that created the Worms series, it is the sequel to the Amiga shooter Project-X. Unlike its predecessor, this game was a console exclusive. Acclaim Entertainment was slated to publish the game in North America, but it was never released in that region. A Sega Saturn version of the game was scrapped during development, at least in part due to Acclaim (who would have published it in North America, as with the PlayStation version) withdrawing support for the Saturn.

Retired pilot Commander Miner is called out of retirement as he is one of the best and last remaining pilots qualified to take the fight to the invading aliens.

Unlike most shoot 'em ups, X2 allows the player to keep the power-ups they have acquired when they lose a life.

== Reception ==
Reception

Review scores
Publication	Score
Electronic Gaming Monthly	5.5/10, 5.5/10, 6/10, 6/10
Dengeki PlayStation	65/100, 70/100

The Electronic Gaming Monthly review team had all four reviewers save Sushi-X agreeing that the game looks good but is frustratingly difficult to the point where it is not fun to play, with numerous points where it is impossible to avoid taking hits. GamePro's Gideon commented, "Although the graphics and sound effects are above average, the overall game experience is too chaotic; in fact, at times it's difficult to identify shots onscreen or to differentiate your own firepower from that of your enemies."
