= Flockers =

2014 strategy video game

- Developer: Team17
- Publisher: Team17
- Platforms: Linux; Microsoft Windows; OS X; PlayStation 4; Xbox One; Android; iOS
- Release: September 19, 2014
- Genre: Strategy
- Mode: Single-player

Flockers is a Lemmings-type strategy game made by Team17. The game was released worldwide on September 19, 2014.

== Gameplay ==
In a similar manner to Lemmings, the player must guide the sheep out of a weapons factory by placing blocks and guiding the animals. Each mission is a different puzzle involving multiple contraptions that the sheep can use to their advantage. The game includes 60 different levels, most of which are in a steam-punk style.

== Reception ==
Reception

Aggregate score
Aggregator	Score
Metacritic	PC: 66/100; PS4: 61/100; XONE: 65/100

Review scores
Publication	Score
Eurogamer	6/10
Hardcore Gamer	4/5
Digital Spy	3/5

Flockers received "mixed or average" reviews according to Metacritic, scoring 66/100 for the PC version based on 11 reviews, 61/100 for the PlayStation 4 version based on 15 reviews, and 65/100 for the Xbox One version based on 10 reviews.
