= Conscript (video game) =

2024 survival horror video game

- Developer: Catchweight Studio
- Publisher: Team17
- Director: Jordan Mochi
- Engine: GameMaker
- Platforms: Windows; PlayStation 4; PlayStation 5; Xbox One; Xbox Series X/S; Nintendo Switch
- Release: 23 July 2024
- Genre: Survival horror
- Mode: Single-player

Conscript is a 2024 survival horror video game developed by Catchweight Studio and published by Team17. Conscript was released on 23 July 2024 for Windows, PlayStation 4, PlayStation 5, Xbox One, Xbox Series X/S and Nintendo Switch.

== Gameplay ==
Conscript is a top-down survival horror game set in 1916 during the Battle of Verdun in World War I. The player controls André, a French soldier, who, along with his brother Pierre, has been conscripted into the French Army. After being separated from his brother, André must explore interconnected areas around the trenches and battlegrounds near Verdun to find him. Areas André explores include Fort de Vaux, Fort Souville, and the ruins of Verdun proper. The player needs to solve puzzles and collect items to progress in the game while managing resources like ammunition and medical supplies.

The main enemies André encounters are German soldiers and rats. The rats can cause infections that will reduce maximum health until treated. Rats spawn in areas where the player has killed soldiers, unless the bodies are burnt. Combat consists of a mix of melee and World War I-era firearms like bolt-action rifles and Ruby pistols. Aiming a firearm causes the reticle to tighten over time, leaving the player vulnerable to attack. Certain actions by the player, such as killing wounded soldiers, finding the personal photographs of slain Germans or completing certain side questlines, causes André's hands to begin to shake and worsens his aim.

== Development ==
Conscript was developed by Jordan Mochi, an Australian solo developer working under the studio name Catchweight Studio. Mochi began the project in 2017 with no prior experience in game development. Earlier prototypes of the game featured a time-travel concept and supernatural elements before Mochi settled on a single setting in World War I. In 2020, Mochi launched a Kickstarter campaign with a funding goal of A$30,000. The campaign raised A$39,659, allowing him to develop the game full-time. Mochi later signed with Team17 as publisher.

Conscript was released on 23 July 2024 for Windows, PlayStation 4, PlayStation 5, Xbox One, Xbox Series X/S, and Nintendo Switch. In December 2025, Conscript: Director's Cut was released, adding a hardcore difficulty mode, new level layouts, new items and equipment, and quality-of-life changes.

== Reception ==
Reception

Aggregate scores
Aggregator	Score
Metacritic	PC: 79/100; PS5: 74/100; XSX: 79/100
OpenCritic	85% recommend

Review scores
Publication	Score
Nintendo Life	6/10
PC Gamer (UK)	83/100

According to review aggregator Metacritic, Conscript received "generally favorable reviews" for the PC and Xbox Series X/S and "mixed or average" reviews for the PlayStation 5. On OpenCritic, the game holds an average score of 78/100 based on 33 critic reviews, with 85% of critics recommending it. Oliver Reynolds of Nintendo Life called it "a mixed bag, then, but certainly not unenjoyable". Alexander Chatziioannou of PC Gamer called it "the best old-school survival horror game in ages" and highlighted the game's bleak environment and sound design. Nic Reuben of Rock Paper Shotgun also complimented the setting, and he enjoyed the combat. Francesco Destri of IGN Italy praised its atmosphere and thematic depth, calling it "a harrowing, immersive survival horror that boldly explores the brutality of WWI".
