= Crown Trick =

2020 video game

- Developer: NExT Studios
- Publisher: Team17
- Engine: Unity Engine
- Platforms: Nintendo Switch; PlayStation 4; Windows; Xbox One
- Release: Nintendo Switch, Windows; 16 October 2020; PlayStation 4, Xbox One; 7 September 2021
- Genres: Adventure, role-playing, roguelike
- Mode: Single-player

Crown Trick is a 2020 adventure role-playing roguelike video game developed by NExT Studios and published by Team17. It was released on 16 October 2020 for Nintendo Switch and Windows, and on 7 September 2021 for PlayStation 4 and Xbox One.

== Gameplay ==
Crown Trick is an adventure role-playing roguelike set in the Nightmare Realm, which is an underground world filled with traps and monsters. Players must combine skills and master the elements to overcome their enemies that stand still until their plan of attack is executed, and, as the quest continues, players can gain access to high-level skills obtained by elite monsters increasing the players chance of success and survival.

== Development and release ==
At ChinaJoy 2019, NExT Studios announced the game would come to PlayStation 4 in addition to its previously announced Windows version. In July 2020, Team17 announced a partnership with NExT Studios to publish the game to Nintendo Switch and Windows in Q3 2020, with a Team17 representative stating the PlayStation 4 version was still coming but they were focusing on the Nintendo Switch and Windows versions first. Crown Trick launched on 16 October 2020 for Nintendo Switch and Windows.

In July 2021, it was announced the game would release on 31 August 2021 for PlayStation 4 and Xbox One. The launch on these platforms was subsequently delayed to 7 September 2021. The game was made available as a day-one release on Xbox Game Pass. On 28 February 2023, it was removed from Game Pass.

== Reception ==
Reception

Aggregate scores
Aggregator	Score
Metacritic	(PC) 83/100; NS (80/100) (PS4) 78/100 (XONE) 81/100
OpenCritic	89% recommend

Review scores
Publication	Score
Nintendo Life	8/10
PC Games (DE)	8/10
Pure Xbox	8/10
Vandal	8/10

Crown Trick received "generally favourable" reviews from critics, according to review aggregator site Metacritic. Fellow review aggregator OpenCritic assessed that the game received strong approval, being recommended by 89% of critics.

Nintendo Life rated the game 8/10 and stated fans of the roguelike genre should check the game out despite some UI issues that needed addressing. PC Games rated it 8/10 and wrote: "The turn based fights are fair, due to their transparency and calculability. Nevertheless, the lack of proper replayability and endgame as well as the small amount of dialogue dull the experience a little." Pure Xbox also rated the game 8/10, and praised the art style, soundtrack, "complex" gameplay and "addictive loop". Vandal, rating the game 8/10, wrote: "The gameplay this adventure offers is much more serene, complex in the best sense of the word, and refreshing. A very interesting title, technically well-executed, and one that will surely be very well received by Switch and PC users."
