= Assassin (video game) =

1992 video game

- Developer(s): Psionic Systems
- Publisher(s): Team17
- Designer(s): David Broadhurst; Haydn Dalton; Allister Brimble
- Composer(s): Allister Brimble
- Platform(s): Amiga
- Release: 1992
- Genre(s): Platform
- Mode(s): Single-player

Assassin is a platform video game with shoot 'em up elements for the Amiga. It was developed by Psionic Systems and published in 1992 by Team17, the company best known for the Worms franchise. Assassin was updated and re-released in 1994 as Assassin: Special Edition.

== Gameplay ==
The character is an assassin that has been hired to kill the antagonist of the game, "Midan". He is then dropped behind enemy lines and must first disable Midan's power source, and then assassinate him. The assassin is armed with a boomerang that is razor-edged. The game is controlled by a joystick.

There are three skill levels: Rookie, Arcade, and Ultimate. As well as changing the difficulty, each level unlocks more of the game than the level that is easier than it. The enemies are tougher to defeat in the higher levels, but there are more rewards.

The player must guide the assassin through the levels facing enemies ranging from vicious dogs to wall mounted laser cannons. As well as the platforms, the player is able to control the assassin to climb on walls and ceilings as a method of getting around, and avoiding enemies. The player can use the boomerang to attack enemies, or use bonus weapons that are gained by achieving certain requirements.

== Development ==
Assassin was developed by Psionic Systems in conjunction with Team17. The project manager was Martyn Brown. It was programmed by David Broadhurst and Haydn Dalton with additional work from Mike and Andrew Oakley. The music and sound effects are by Allister Brimble.

== Reception ==
Assassin has received high ratings. The One Amiga rated the game 92%, praising all areas of the game. In particular the sound effects. In the review, the reviewer noted that the sound effects were "some of the most imaginative and atmospheric I've ever heard". The only criticism in the review was that some of the backgrounds seemed empty.

The review from Amiga Power noted the similarities of the game to Strider and Turrican, but overall rated the game highly at 89%. Again, the atmosphere of the game was praised, as were the graphics and animation.

CU Amiga scored the game 89% and noted the size of the game maps. There are over 1500 screens over the five levels. The magazine said this was one of the games most striking features.

In episode 2 of season 1, British television show Bad Influence! gave it 4 stars (from the girls) and 3 stars (from the boys), out of a maximum of 5.

Despite the critical acclaim, Martyn Brown, co-founder of Team17 considers Assassin to be Team17's least successful game. He attributes this to limited appeal.

== Legacy ==
Assassin: Special Edition was released 2 years after the original game and various gameplay elements were altered. The first level was removed, along with dogs as enemies, and the boomerang has been replaced with a laser gun. Amiga Power gave the game a lower rating of 79%, but still praised most of it.
