= Arcade Pool =

1994 video game

- Developer: Team17
- Publisher: Team17
- Designer: Mario Savoia
- Composer: Allister Brimble
- Platforms: Amiga, CD32, MS-DOS
- Release: 1994 (snooker version, 1995)
- Genre: Sports (pool)
- Modes: Single-player, multiplayer

Arcade Pool is a cue sports simulation game developed and published in 1994 by Team17, initially for the Amiga. The game was later ported to MS-DOS. An Amiga CD32 release followed. The game is a top-down pool simulator with accurate physics. It includes many British and American variations of pool as well as two variations of ball set (standard UK red and yellow, and standard US circles and stripes).

Computer-controlled players are named after members of Team17 Staff (with Creative Director Martyn Brown being the most difficult computer-controlled player). The computer-controlled players with the lowest difficulty are all named after staff of Future Publishing-owned Amiga gaming magazine Amiga Power, adding more fuel to the fierce rivalry between the two companies.

== Legacy ==
A sequel, Arcade Pool 2 (alternately stylized Arcade Pool II), was published in 1999 by Hasbro Interactive through their MicroProse label. It was essentially an updated and overhauled version of the original, albeit with Internet play and additional play modes.
