= Headbangers: Rhythm Royale =

2023 video game

- Developer: Glee Cheese Studio
- Publisher: Team17
- Engine: Unity Engine
- Platforms: Nintendo Switch; PlayStation 4; PlayStation 5; Windows; Xbox One; Xbox Series X/S
- Release: 31 October 2023
- Genres: Battle royale, rhythm
- Mode: Multiplayer

Headbangers: Rhythm Royale is a 2023 rhythm battle royale video game developed by Glee Cheese Studio and published by Team17. It was released on 31 October 2023 for Nintendo Switch, PlayStation 4, PlayStation 5, Windows, Xbox One and Xbox Series X/S.

== Gameplay ==
Headbangers: Rhythm Royale is a rhythm battle royale game where players, who play as pidgeons, compete in mini-games with music to come out on top. Players must make it through four rounds of mini-games in order to become the master headbanger. Players will also collect breadcrumbs as they compete which can be used to buy cosmetics such as outfits, accessories and taunts. The game supports up to 30 players.

== Development and release ==
At Future Games Showcase in June 2023, the game was revealed and confirmed to launch on Nintendo Switch, PlayStation 4, PlayStation 5, Windows, Xbox One and Xbox Series X/S later in 2023. Headbangers: Rhythm Royale launched on 31 October 2023 for all platforms. The game was made available as a day-one release on Xbox Game Pass. On 31 October 2024, it was removed from Game Pass.

== Reception ==
Reception

Aggregate score
Aggregator	Score
Metacritic	(PS5) 74/100 (XSXS) 73/100

Review score
Publication	Score
Push Square	6/10

Headbangers: Rhythm Royale received "mixed or average" reviews from critics, according to review aggregator site Metacritic.

Push Square rated the game 6/10 and wrote: "Other than the online tournament mode, it's a bare bones experience. Longevity of this will hinge on future content and more diverse play options (couch co-op in particular). In its current state, though, the bite-sized events offer a welcome alternative to the rat race of other party royale titles."
