= Ship of Fools (video game) =

2022 video game

- Developer: Fika Productions
- Publisher: Team17
- Platforms: Windows; PlayStation 5; Xbox SeriesX/S; Nintendo Switch
- Release: 22 November 2022

Ship of Fools is a cooperative seafaring roguelike video game developed by Canadian-based development team Fika Productions and published by Team17. It was released on 22 November 2022 for Windows, PlayStation 5, Xbox Series X/S, and the Nintendo Switch.

== History ==
Developer Fika Productions is based in Quebec City, Canada. The game was first unveiled in March 2022, with early development builds being selectively distributed to various outlets.

== Gameplay ==
The game puts players in control of a ship that is sailing through a fantasy world, attempting to prevent the "Aquapocalypse." The different characters that can be selected are called Fools, and there are ten different characters that are able to be played without the purchase of DLC. Different characters have different abilities or stat benefits that they offer. Players progress by fighting off enemies using various weapons that can be unlocked throughout the playthrough.

== Reception ==
Reception

Aggregate score
Aggregator	Score
Metacritic	77/100 (PS5)

Review score
Publication	Score
Nintendo Life	7.3/10

The game received "generally favorable" reviews, according to the review aggregation website Metacritic.

Multiplayer.it rated the game at 7.5/10. Nintendo Life described the Nintendo Switch version of the game as a "roguelite deck defence that's a blast with a mate."
