= King of Seas =

2021 video game

- Developer: 3DClouds
- Publisher: Team17
- Engine: Unreal Engine
- Platforms: Nintendo Switch; PlayStation 4; Windows; Xbox One
- Release: 25 May 2021
- Genre: Action role-playing
- Mode: Single-player

King of Seas is a 2021 action role-playing game developed by 3DClouds and published by Team17. It was released on 25 May 2021 for Nintendo Switch, PlayStation 4, Windows and Xbox One. It received mixed reviews from critics.

== Gameplay ==
King of Seas is an action role-playing game set in the Golden Age of Piracy. The game delivers a procedurally generated world; players can choose their own path, explore new islands, interact with characters and face other pirates. Players can also acquire different ships on their journey and the world will react based on the actions of the player. Mythical sea creatures, such as a Basilisk, Abyssal Fish, Cursed Golem, and Kraken, will be summoned for players to fight and loot after completing in-game quests.

== Development and release ==
In July 2020, Milan, Italy-based developers 3DClouds announced King of Seas and stated that the game was scheduled to come out later that year for Nintendo Switch, PlayStation 4, Windows and Xbox One. It was later announced in January 2021 that the game would be released on 18 February 2021.

On 11 February 2021, 3DClouds partnered with Team17. The game was subsequently delayed until May to improve the overall gameplay quality and implement more language options. King of Seas launched on 25 May 2021 for all platforms. In November 2021, the 'Monster Update' was released for free.

== Reception ==
Reception

Aggregate score
Aggregator	Score
Metacritic	(PC) 68/100 (NS) 65/100 (PS4) 63/100 (XONE) 70/100

Review scores
Publication	Score
Nintendo Life	5/10
PC Games (DE)	78/100
Push Square	6/10
PlayStation Universe	4/10

King of Seas received "mixed or average" reviews from critics, according to review aggregator site Metacritic.

Nintendo Life rated it 5/10 and praised the start of the game, describing the story and combat mechanics as "promising", but stated that repetition set in quickly and criticised its depth. PC Gamer rated the game 78/100 and wrote: "Fun, cartoonish pirating, which makes you feel cheeky rather than evil". Push Square, which rated the game 6/10, praised the RPG progression and the character art but criticised the lack of mission variety and the "awkward" menus. PlayStation Universe was also critical, rating the game 4/10, and wrote: "King Of Seas ultimately suffers through a lack of visual polish, some frustrating gameplay mechanics, and dull pacing and sequences, which when all combined together create a thoroughly unremarkable experience that doesn't manage to hold its own against even some of the most average of pirate games on the market."
