= Thalassa: Edge of the Abyss =

2024 video game

- Developer: Sarepta Studio
- Publisher: Team17
- Director: Yvette Bublitz
- Designers: Christian Bull-Hansen; Ross Hartshorn
- Programmer: Øyvind Rasmussen
- Artist: Kjartan Widerøe Forthun
- Writers: Matt Gibbs; Giles Armstrong
- Composer: Simon Poole
- Platform: Windows
- Release: WW: August 1, 2024
- Genre: Adventure
- Mode: Single-player

Thalassa: Edge of the Abyss is a 2024 adventure game developed by Sarepta Studio and published by Team17. Players explore the wreckage of a 19th-century ship of which they were previously a crewmember.

== Gameplay ==
In 1905, a diver named Cam (Cameron abbreviated) leaves their ship, the Thalassa, after an accident causes them to become traumatised. When the Thalassa sinks and everyone dies, they return to explore the wreckage and find out what happened. Thalassa: Edge of the Abyss is an adventure game in which players explore in first-person perspective. Players search for clues and figure out how they interrelate, similar to arranging a mind map. Players can collect items that will help them guide Cam through the Thalassa, such as keys and bolt cutters.

== Development ==
Team17 released Thalassa: Edge of the Abyss for Windows on August 1, 2024. Sarepta, the developers, are an independent studio in Norway.

== Reception ==
Thalassa: Edge of the Abyss received positive reviews on Metacritic. RTÉ.ie said it is initially a slow-paced game that requires a lot of backtracking, but the story becomes very affecting. Slant Magazine realized some of the answers to the mysteries before the game would let them solve it. They criticized the use of cutscenes and found the story to be uneven, though they said it sometimes channels the uneasiness of being somewhere one should not be. VG247 said the story starts off slowly, but they grew to enjoy it. They recommended it to people looking for a game that balances complex themes with fun gameplay.
