= ATR: All Terrain Racing =

1995 video game

- Publisher: Team17
- Programmer: Jamie Woodhouse
- Artist: Daniel J. Burke
- Composer: Allister Brimble
- Platforms: Amiga, CD32
- Release: May 8, 1995
- Genre: Racing
- Modes: Single-player, multiplayer

ATR: All Terrain Racing is a racing game published by Team17 for Amiga and Amiga CD32 on May 8, 1995. During a protracted dispute between Team17 and Amiga Power, the magazine's reviewer, Jonathan Nash, awarded ATR: All Terrain Racing a rating of 38%, prompting the developer to pursue a lawsuit for defamation.

== Gameplay ==
ATR: All Terrain Racing is a top-down racer. Gameplay featured three game modes across 6 different types of tracks and 3 vehicle styles.

The majority of tracks in ATR were designed with long and short routes offering navigational strategy options. Tracks also contain environmental hazards the player has to avoid, such as oil slicks and small jumps as well as pick-ups such as turbos. Tracks have turns that are not just 90 degrees in nature, a feature not present in Overdrive, ATR's predecessor.

== Notes ==
1. Maddock, Jonathan (June 1995). "ATR CD32". Amiga Computing US Edition.
2. Bradley, Stephen (July 1995). "ATR CD32". Amiga Format.
3. Webb, Stevie L. (May 1995). "ATR CD32". CU Amiga.
4. Broughton, Matt (May 1995). "ATR CD32". The One Amiga.
5. "ATR: All Terrain Racing". Amiga CD32 Gamer. September 1994.
6. Cusick, Dave (November 1994). "All Terrain Racing". Amiga Computing.
7. Löwenstein, Richard (August 1994). "Neues von Team 17" [News from Team 17]. Amiga Joker (in German).
8. Winstanley, Mark (September 1994). "All Terrain Racer". Amiga Power.
9. Broughton, Matt (September 1994). "More Gears Than Most". The One Amiga.
10. McNally, Paul & Steve McNally (February 1995). "ATR". Amiga Action.
11. Lofthouse, Gareth (April 1995). "All Terrain Racing". Amiga Computing.
12. Lubrano, Sébastien (April 1995). "ATR: All Terrain Racing". Amiga Dream.
13. Bradley, Stephen (April 1995). "ATR". Amiga Format.
14. "ATR: All Terrain Racing". Amiga Joker (in German). April 1995.
15. Nash, Jonathan (April 1995). "ATR". Amiga Power.
16. "All Terrain Racing". Amiga User International. May 1995.
17. Daniel Rutter (May 1995). "ATR". Australian Commodore and Amiga Review.
18. Skews, Rik (April 1995). "ATR". CU Amiga.
19. Kaufeldt, Ove (June 1995). "ATR: All Terrain Racing". Datormagazin (in Swedish).
20. Nuttall, Andy (March 1995). "ATR". The One Amiga.
