= Overdrive (1993 video game) =

1993 video game

- Developer: Psionic Systems
- Publisher: Team17
- Platforms: Amiga, MS-DOS
- Release: 1993

Overdrive is a 1993 video game from Team17. The game was released for MS-DOS in April 1994.

== Gameplay ==
Overdrive is a game which offers a high-stakes, league-based driving experience. Players begin with a modest sum of cash, which they use to enter races against eight aggressive opponents. The goal is to climb the league rankings and ultimately face the formidable Demon Driver on one of several specialized tracks, each offering a unique ending and a mysterious prize for those who prevail. Gameplay unfolds across a variety of circuits where players can qualify through timed laps—though grid position offers little advantage, the practice proves essential for mastering track layouts. During races, drivers collect performance-enhancing items like wheels, spanners, and fuel, which improve vehicle handling and are tracked throughout the game. Four distinct vehicle types—4x4s, Buggies, Supersports, and Grand Prix cars—each demand different driving techniques. Progression hinges on both skill and resource management: players must avoid finishing last in three races or running out of cash. Some events require outright victory to advance, while others merely demand survival.

== Reception ==
Reception

Review scores
Publication	Score
Amiga Action	83%
Aktueller Software Markt	7/10
Amiga Joker	73%
Liverpool Echo	4/5
Nottingham Post	76%
Power Play	45%

Amiga Action gave the game a score of 83% stating "Overdrive is an outstanding racing game. Fast action, variation are the key ingredients for a game of this type and Overdrive is literally flowing with them.
