= Sheltered (video game) =

2016 video game

- Developer: Unicube
- Publisher: Team17
- Designers: Sonny Meek, Dean Foster
- Platforms: Linux; Microsoft Windows; OS X; PlayStation 4; Xbox One; Android; iOS; Nintendo Switch
- Release: WW: 15 March 2016; Android, iOS; WW: 25 October 2017; Switch; WW: 18 December 2018
- Genre: Survival game
- Mode: Single-player

Sheltered is a post-apocalyptic survival game developed by Unicube. Team17 published it on 17 March 2016, for Linux, Microsoft Windows, OS X, PlayStation 4, Xbox One, Android, iOS, and Nintendo Switch. Players control a family that survives a nuclear war by taking refuge in an abandoned underground war shelter that they found. As their supplies run low, the family must scrounge above ground.

== Gameplay ==
A family survives a nuclear war by taking refuge in an underground shelter. Players must guide the family to survive various threats, such as starvation, radiation poisoning, and dehydration.

Players will need to extend the shelter, build toilets and showers for hygiene and stress prevention, and storage for all manner of items, including food, water and crafting components and upgrade many aspects of the shelter to improve the lives of the family.

Each family member starts with two traits, choosing a positive one when creating the characters, and including a negative one when the game starts. Negative traits can be changed to positive ones if certain conditions are met (e.g., unhygienic can be changed to hygienic by contracting food poisoning). Sheltered also features permadeath for characters.

Players will also choose a pet for their family, the pet can provide many different advantages if they keep the pet alive, and if the pet dies, each family member will suffer severe trauma.

In order to get supplies for the shelter, the family will need to go on expeditions, the map is randomly generated, and different locations contain different loot unique to them.

On the surface, family members will meet survivors of the nuclear war, these characters have procedurally generated appearance, stats, and traits, these survivors can be killed for their items, traded with, or even recruited to their shelter, though players will have to carefully watch what the survivors say prior to recruitment as "psychopathic" survivors may try murdering the characters in their shelter before running away, if their loyalty has gone up completely, then the recruit will not attempt any murder, and can go on expeditions themselves. NPC survivors are more liable to come in groups or armed with more powerful weapons as the days go on.

The penultimate quest of each map and overall goal of the game, "Extended Family", is obtained by fixing the camper van above the shelter, and scanning frequencies with the radio. The player must get some requested items for the survivor they meet for the quest; when the survivor's request is fulfilled, they will inform the family of a new shelter housing another member of their family. The player can then move to their new shelter, leaving their recruited surface survivors and old shelter behind. The new shelter contains a procedurally generated new family member, who can be either an adult or a child, as well as a chance to obtain a new pet if the previous one died, with each shelter and map travelled to becoming harder to survive in.

The game is over when all members of the family die; all family members are colour-coded red, and therefore are more important to keep alive than recruits, even when there's recruits left alive, the game will be lost and the save file will be deleted.

As the days go on, factions will start appearing, these factions are often more dangerous than other procedurally generated survivors, and cannot be recruited, while not all are hostile upon meeting them and may trade with the player, they are more likely to be hostile and attack the player, there are four factions in the game;

- The Scalpers are people dressed like native cannibals, they always lack any body armor and will rarely have many powerful weapons if any at all, this is the weakest faction in the game, and the earliest to start appearing across the map.
- The Matriarchs are composed of women who consider themselves "tough as nails and won't spare bullets or blades", they are a little more likely to have stronger weapons than the Scalpers, but still tend to lack any body armor.
- The Marauders are usually seen dressed in biker clothing or blood covered butcher's aprons and assorted masks such as respirators, gas masks and hockey masks, they are usually seen with more powerful melee weapons such as axes and the occasional firearm.
- The Corps is the deadliest and latest survivor group to be encountered in the game, they are remnants of the military and are the most often seen wearing body armor compared to the other factions, while some members may still be holding melee weapons, the Corps are more commonly armed with firearms.

== Development ==
Following a successful Kickstarter funding drive in which the game surpassed its goal of £15,000, Team17 announced they would publish the game. It was released on 15 March 2016. The game was last updated on 16 July 2019.

== Reception ==
Reception

Aggregate score
Aggregator	Score
Metacritic	PC: 62/100; PS4: 70/100; XONE: 69/100; NS: 61/100

At Metacritic, the Windows version has an aggregate score of 62/100, 69/100 on Xbox One, and 70/100 on PlayStation 4. Sam Loveridge Digital Spy cited Sheltered as "Xbox Live Game of the Week" and rated it 5/5 stars, comparing it to This War of Mine. Reviewing the Windows version for Eurogamer, Cassandra Khaw wrote, "Sheltered is an interesting attempt to simulate the life of a post-nuclear family, but it falls short of its potential." Also reviewing the Windows version, Kyle LeClair of Hardcore Gamer rated it 3.5/5 stars and called it a "fun and challenging game" that nevertheless fails to stand out from other survival games.

== Sequel ==
Sheltered 2, a direct sequel, was scheduled to release on PC in 2021.
