= Project-X =

1992 video game

- Developer: Team17
- Publisher: Team17
- Composer: Allister Brimble
- Platforms: Amiga, MS-DOS, Amiga CD32 (special edition)
- Release: 1992
- Genre: Scrolling shooter
- Modes: Single player, multiplayer

Project-X is a horizontally scrolling shooter developed and published by Team17 for the Amiga in 1992. It was ported to MS-DOS and the Amiga CD32. The game resembles Konami's side-scrolling shooter games such as Gradius, Salamander and Parodius.

== Plot ==
Taking place many years in the future in colonized space, military scientists have disposed of countless, defective military droids on an un-colonized terrestrial planet called Ryxx. The droids eventually become sentient and, by way of revenge, start an attack against mankind, using a station to continually create more war machines. It is the player's mission to undergo Project X and eliminate the droid forces.

== Gameplay ==
Players control a spacecraft of their choice, battling hundreds of alien ships. Various power-ups, frequent in the first level, but progressively rare afterwards, permit an exponential increase of the spacecraft's seven different weapons (Guns, Buildup, Side Shots, Homing Missiles, Plasma, Magma, and Laserbeam).

The game is composed of five levels. Many players never completed the second one (which had a very difficult ending), and most of the rest never went past level three. When Team17 realized this, they released Project-X SE on Amiga CD32, a special edition with the difficulty toned down. It was released as a budget game. A hack for the original game to enable the player to skip levels by holding down the fire button and pressing the escape key was also distributed on the coverdisks of several Amiga magazines.

== Reception ==
According to Next Generation, Project-X was highly successful in Europe, but only sold in moderate numbers in the U.S. Amiga Computing called it one of the best shooter games for that platform at the time, both for its technical excellence in graphics and sounds, and for its difficult and interesting gameplay.

== Legacy ==
The game was followed by a PlayStation-only sequel, titled X2 in 1996. A second sequel, Project X: Light Years, is currently in development.

The game was parodied in one level of Team17's own Superfrog, as Project-F (with the 'F' presumably standing for "Frog"), even going as far as using a remixed version of the original game's theme tune.
