= Windfall gain =

Unusually high income that is sudden and/or unexpected

A windfall gain is a sudden and usually unexpected addition to income which is substantially above the norm. Windfall gains usually refer to a gain in an individual's income, while the term windfall profit refers to unexpected increases in profit for a company or business.

== Definition ==
The term "windfall" originally referred to fruit and branches blown from trees, which were considered to no longer belong to the tree's owner and were therefore free to claim by any passerby who discovered them. As such, windfall gains are by definition those that arise primarily through luck or circumstance, rather than through forward planning. That being said, windfall gains can be anticipated and actions taken to increase the likelihood of being a beneficiary - just as someone could plan to pass a tree every day to check for fallen fruit, or wait for one to fall on a windy day. However, in these cases, the value of the gain or when it will materialise is unknown, the actions taken are small in proportion to the gain, and the gain is still a result of external circumstances. Examples of windfall gains include, but are not limited to:

- An inheritance or other large monetary gift from another
- Favourable settlement from a lawsuit
- Unexpectedly large employment payroll bonuses
- Proceeds from an insurance claim
- Unexpectedly large returns on investments, such as a large dividend payout
- Proceeds or profit from a large sale (often a unique asset, e.g. art or real estate) where the sale is much larger than expected or when the timing of the sale is controlled by external circumstances
- Significant increase in land value through government actions (e.g. rezoning)
- Sweepstakes winnings
- Winning a lottery or success in another form of gambling
- Game show, or other contest winnings
- Discovery of large reserves of natural resources
- Discoveries from treasure hunting

== Uses ==
What people do with windfall gains is subject to much debate. While they differ from one account to the next, most economists hypothesize that the majority of the gains are saved, due to the Permanent Income Hypothesis.

== Windfall profits ==
Windfall profits are a type of windfall gain. They can occur due to unforeseen circumstances in a product's market, such as unexpected demand or government regulation.

== Taxation ==
Since windfall profits were unforeseen, some legislators believe that taxing them at a higher rate, or confiscating them outright, should not hurt the company. This type of taxation is known as a windfall profits tax.

== See also ==
- Demutualization – Form of privatization
