= The Escapists =

2015 strategy video game

- Developer: Mouldy Toof Studios
- Publisher: Team17
- Designer: Chris Davis
- Engine: Unity (PS4/Switch); Clickteam Fusion (Windows, OS X) (Note: Microsoft Windows, Linux and OS X versions only)
- Platforms: Windows, OS X, Linux, Switch, PlayStation 4, Amazon Fire TV, Xbox 360, Xbox One, iOS, Android
- Release: Windows, Xbox One: WW: 13 February 2015; PlayStation 4: NA: 2 June 2015; EU: 29 May 2015; OS X, Linux: WW: 21 October 2015; Xbox 360: WW: 18 December 2015; iOS, Android: WW: 2 March 2017; Switch: WW: 25 September 2018
- Genres: Strategy, role-playing
- Mode: Single-player

The Escapists is a strategy game developed by Mouldy Toof Studios and following a Steam Early Access release in 2014, was released in 2015 for Microsoft Windows, macOS, Linux, Xbox 360, Xbox One and PlayStation 4. It was released on iOS and Android in 2017. A Nintendo Switch version of the game containing all downloadable content was released in 2018. The game was launched on the Epic Games Store on 23 September 2021, with the weekly free game campaign of Epic Games. Players assume the role of an inmate and must escape from prisons of increasing difficulty.

Versions planned for the Nintendo Wii U, OUYA, Playstation Vita, Nintendo 3DS, Nintendo DS, PlayStation Portable, PlayStation 2, PlayStation, Sega Dreamcast, Nintendo GameCube, Xbox, Nintendo Wii, Sega Saturn, Sega 32X, Oculus Quest 2, and PlayStation 3 were cancelled before release due to "delayed development".

Reviewers praised the freedom of approach the game offered players, yet some were frustrated by the trial-and-error approach required to learn its systems. A sequel, The Escapists 2, was released in 2017.

== Gameplay ==
In The Escapists, the player, who assumes the role of a prisoner, must escape from six primary prisons that progress in difficulty. Each time a prison is escaped the next prison is unlocked. There are additional prisons released as downloadable content (DLC) which can be played in any order regardless of the player's progress. Outside of the main game, there is also the "Prison Editor" mode, which allows players to create their own prisons out of in-game assets that they can choose to publish online for other players to download.

In the beginning, the player selects their name and can choose the names of prisoners and guards if desired. Once the names are selected the game starts from day 1 waking up in the player character's cell. From here, the player is expected to attend daily routines, such as meals, work, exercise and showers, as to prevent guards from becoming suspicious. Skipping routines comes with manageable consequences, but all roll calls are mandatory and lockdowns will occur if the player character does not attend. Players can acquire various items to aid in their escape by buying or stealing them from other inmates, or by crafting them by combining two or three items. Players can do favours for fellow inmates, and once the favour is completed the player is rewarded a certain amount of money, which can be used to purchase items or tips from the prison's payphone. Favours can range from distracting the guards during routines, to procuring certain items for the inmate. Prisoners also possess an "opinion" stat, which represents their feelings towards the player character. A high opinion will see inmates respecting the player and fighting for them, and a low opinion will likely result in inmates attacking the player randomly or snitching on them.

Engaging in exercise and using the library or internet allows players to level up their character's statistics- strength, speed, and intelligence respectively, which improves certain abilities and their chance of escape. Strength increases maximum health and damage dealt, speed increases the rate of attack, and intelligence allows the player to craft a wider arrangement of items, along with being able to apply for higher paying prison jobs.

Guards will routinely patrol the prison, watching for damage to prison property, contraband, or anything otherwise prohibited. Guard snipers will also monitor all outside activity from towers, and will shoot disorderly inmates if prompted. Inmates must be careful to hide all contraband as guards will periodically search the inmates' desks every roll call. If the player is caught out of their cell after lights out, caught stealing a guard key, caught with contraband in their desk, or if prison damage is found at any point, the player will be sent into solitary confinement. Any damage such as chipped walls, broken vents and tunnels are repaired, along with all contraband being found and confiscated.

The ultimate objective is to evade being caught under all circumstances and escape the prison. There are a number of escape methods including inciting prison riots, via vents, tunnels, roofs, among others. Prisons will also have various security measures as the player progresses, such as cameras, contraband detectors, perimeter jeeps, minefields, guard checkpoints, etc. Early prisons will typically have low security, such as the luxurious and carefree Center Perks, but as the player progresses they escalate vastly in difficulty, from Shankton State Pen, a crowded state penitentiary surrounded by fences and walls, to San Pancho, a ferociously hot desert prison where inmates are so strong and aggressive to the point where even the guards are frightened of them. Upon escaping a prison, the player is presented with a victory screen where they can view their stats and overall score.

== Development and release ==
The Escapists is the second game by Chris Davis' one man studio. Davis raised £7,131 for the game through Kickstarter in November 2013, this allowed him to commit full-time to game development for the first time in his career. Unlike his first title, Spud's Quest, Davis signed a publishing deal with Team17 to better market the game. Team17 contributed the tutorial and ported the game to Unity for Xbox One support.

The game was inspired by the 1984 video game Skool Daze, one of Davis's favourite titles. Davis limited the hint system and the tutorial to encourage experimentation by the players. He hoped that by allowing players to discover the solution themselves, they would feel a greater sense of achievement. For inspiration, Davis watched prison films and researched prison escapes.

The game was released for Steam Early Access in August 2014. Feedback from the early access release allowed Davis to improve the game, such as by adjusting the difficulty. It allowed him to experiment with ideas and solicit suggestions from the player community. Davis stated that, "the community is what made the game into what it is", and that "Early Access has been a really good experience for the game." The full game was released in February 2015.

=== Downloadable content ===
There are five downloadable content (DLC) packages available for the game.

The first DLC, "Fhurst Peak Correctional Facility" was originally added as a bonus prison for Early Access players, but was added as DLC due to popular demand as an extra prison.

The second DLC, titled "Alcatraz", is based on the Alcatraz Federal Penitentiary. It was released for PC, PlayStation, and Xbox One on 2 April 2015.

"Escape Team", the third DLC package was released on 30 June 2015 for PC, PlayStation 4, and Xbox One. It allows to play as four different prisoners, as opposed to one. The four characters are based on the A-Team.

"Duct Tapes are Forever", the fourth DLC, was released on 3 November 2015 for PC and PlayStation 4, and 4 November for the Xbox One. It is James Bond themed, with the player assuming the role of a super-spy, trying to escape from an evil villain's lair.

The fifth DLC package, "Santa's Sweatshop", was released for free on 8 December 2015 for PC, Xbox One, and PlayStation 4.

== Reception ==
Reception

Aggregate score
Aggregator	Score
Metacritic	PC: 71/100; XONE: 74/100; PS4: 71/100 iOS: 80/100; NS: 67/100

Review scores
Publication	Score
Game Informer	6/10
GameSpot	8/10
IGN	7.6/10
Official Xbox Magazine (US)	7/10
X-One	7/10

The Escapists received generally positive reviews, with Windows and Xbox versions holding scores of 71 out of 100 and 74 out of 100 respectively on review aggregator website Metacritic.

Reviews highlighted the freedom in approach that the game allowed, and reviewers told stories of their break outs. GameSpot writer Cameron Woolsey described tunnelling his way out, Official Xbox Magazine (OXM) writer Andy Kelly, described hiding his ventilation system escape by crafting a fake papier-mâché vent cover, while X-One's Dom Peppiatt straightforwardly shivved a guard and stole his keys.

Reviewers were mixed on the learning curve presented by the game, even positive reviews such as OXM's acknowledged that the game "won't be for everyone", requiring "patience and a creative mind" in the player. Without an in depth tutorial, X-One believed the game "perhaps relies a little too heavily on trial-and-error". Kimberley Wallace, writing at Game Informer found this trial-and-error approach frustrating, finding herself "constantly punished for mistakes and losing progress" due to outcomes which were impossible to predict. On the other hand, she felt this level of challenge contributed to "a grand sense of accomplishment when you win".

Game Informer criticized the interaction with other inmates as shallow and artificial, requiring the player to perform "boring favours" to "just [raise] a meter". Richard Cobbett, writing for IGN, noted that how despite the "adorable 16-bit style graphics", he would quickly perceive fellow prison inmates without empathy as "pure puzzle game piece[s]" rather than characters. He also stated "As a mix of sandbox, puzzle and open-world action, The Escapists offers something fresh and entertaining." OXM felt the game had character, citing the non-player characters' "amusing non sequiturs and pop culture references". Dan Whitehead at Eurogamer agreed, praising the game's "thriving social element" which make it easy to get "sucked into the petty vendettas and mini dramas of day to day prison life."

Eurogamer recommended the game, concluding that while it had minor frustrations, "there's nothing here that really spoils what is an otherwise delightful and endlessly surprising game". GameSpot finished by saying the game would provide hours of gratifying entertainment, and with the developer working on tools for user-generated content, it could provide even more in the future.

== Legacy ==
The Escapists: The Walking Dead, also known as The Escapists: The Walking Dead Edition, is a standalone spin-off developed by Team17 released 2015–2016 for PC, PlayStation 4, and Xbox One. It merges the core gameplay of The Escapists with the characters, locations and theme of The Walking Dead comic books.

Another spin-off, The Survivalists, where the player has to survive on an abandoned island, was announced on 10 December 2019, as part of a Nintendo Indie World showcase and was released on October 9, 2020, for PC, Mac, Xbox One, PlayStation 4, Nintendo Switch, and iOS through Apple Arcade.

A sequel, titled The Escapists 2, which introduces multiplayer, was released for Microsoft Windows, macOS, Linux, PlayStation 4 and Xbox One on 22 August 2017. A version for the Nintendo Switch was released on 11 January 2018, and iOS and Android ports on 31 January 2019.
