= Full Contact (video game) =

1991 video game

- Developer(s): Team17
- Publisher(s): Team17
- Platform(s): Amiga
- Release: 1991
- Genre(s): Fighting
- Mode(s): Single-player, multiplayer

Full Contact is a 1991 video game developed and published by Team17 for the Amiga.

== Plot ==
As a young boy, the protagonist witnessed the murder of his family by members of the Triad. Years later, after undergoing martial arts training under the guidance of an ancient monastic order, he embarks on a quest to locate the leaders of the Triad and bring them to justice.

== Gameplay ==
Full Contact is a fighting game where the player engages in a sequence of one-on-one battles, with victory going to the fighter who first depletes their opponent's health bar. The player character is unarmed but some of the opponents wield different kinds of weapons like blades or sticks. The player is able to upgrade their skills by playing minigames between rounds which makes kicks and punches more powerful and faster. There is also a two-player multiplayer mode and a tournament mode for 4-16 people.

The intro animation is a digitalized move sequence of Jean Claude Van Damme from movie "Kickboxer".

== Reception ==
Reception

Review scores
| Publication | Score |
|---|---|
| Amiga Action | 68% |
| Amiga Format | 86% |
| Games-X | 4/5 |
| Génération 4 | 83% |
| Tilt | 18/20 |
| CU Amiga | 80% |

Amiga Format called it a good game with "sumptuous graphics, great sound and high-speed punching gameplay." CU Amiga wrote: "Full Contact is a more than respectable first game from Team 17 and it's positively a steal at £9.95." Games-X said: "Full Contact is the game to take IK+ off its pedestal. The game features slick graphics, with some of the best animated sprites I've seen." Amiga Action concluded: "Full Contact is good looking but awful to play."
