= Superfrog =

1993 video game

- Developer: Team17
- Publisher: Team17
- Designer: Martyn Brown
- Programmer: Andreas Tadic
- Artist: Rico Holmes
- Composer: Allister Brimble
- Platforms: Amiga, CD32, MS-DOS
- Release: 1993: Amiga; 1994: MS-DOS, CD32
- Genre: Platform
- Mode: Single-player

Superfrog is a scrolling 2D platform game, originally developed for the Amiga and published in 1993 by Team17. Later MS-DOS release was created by Bubball Systems and distributed by Team17, Ocean Software and GOG.com.

== Gameplay ==
Superfrog in world 2: "Spooky Castle"

The objective of the game is to find and defeat a witch, thus rescuing a princess, whilst achieving smaller objectives throughout the game, such as finding a golden key from the castle or escaping from captivity in a circus.

There are 24 regular levels, divided into six differently themed worlds (Magic Woods, Spooky Castle, Fun Park, Ancient Level, Ice World and Space Level). The goal of each level is to collect a set number of coins, and then reach the exit, which will only open if Superfrog has collected enough coins. Extra factors of gameplay include a timer countdown and a number of health points, both of which can be restored by finding bottles of Lucozade among the levels.

Depending on the number of coins and fruit collected, and on how fast the player finishes the level, a number of credits (up to a maximum of 15) are awarded at the end of each level. The player can then choose to either collect the credits for a score or gamble them in a slot machine-style minigame for more bonuses. The most important function of the slot machine minigame is the chance to win a level code, enabling the player to restart the game from the beginning of the next level at a later time.

An extra level between world 5 and 6 takes the form of a side-scrolling shoot 'em up called Project-F in homage to Team17's own Project-X (even going as far as using a remixed version of the original game's theme tune). Rather than collecting coins, the objective of this stage is to survive to the end. This level was omitted from the PC conversion of the game. After completing all six worlds, the game ends with a small boss fight against the witch in a castle setting.

== Plot ==
The story, present in the game's manual but mostly conveyed through the introductory animation by Eric W. Schwartz, concerns an unnamed prince, who is turned into a frog by a jealous witch, in homage to the Frog Prince fairy tale. His princess girlfriend is then abducted by the same witch. Subsequently, sulking by the "River O' Despair", the prince chances upon a floating bottle of Lucozade, which confers upon him super powers. With his new powers, the prince heads off to fight the evil witch and save the princess.

Schwartz originally included a joke cameo in introductory animation of Sonic, Mario, Zool and Zooz from Zool 2, which Team17 ultimately removed to avoid legal issues.

== Development ==
Superfrog was developed in 1993 and released for the Amiga in the same year by Team17, acting simultaneously as developer and publisher. Eric W. Schwartz provided the animated introduction and closing scene. The release was popular enough to spawn an Amiga CD32 version, which could also be played on some Amiga computers fitted with a CD drive, since the code remained very similar.

Due to its enduring popularity, it was then converted for the PC MS-DOS by Bubball Systems in 1994, this version lacked the animated introduction and shooting mini-game. The Amiga CD32 version was re-released as a budget game by Islona Software in 1999. In 2012, MS-DOS version of Superfrog has been, along with other games by Team17, released as a legitimate digital download from GOG.com, this version being the first compatible with Windows.

== Reception ==
Reception

Review scores
Publication	Score
Aktueller Software Markt	10/12
Amiga Action	89%
Amiga Computing	93%
Amiga Force	88%
Amiga Format	85%
Amiga Power	78%
Computer and Video Games	90/100
GamesMaster	90%
Génération 4	90%
Jeuxvideo.com	14/20
PC Zone	40/100

Team17's earlier games became relatively obscure after the release of the hugely popular Worms series, though many gamers remember Superfrog fondly for its solid gameplay, smooth scrolling, cartoon-quality graphics, and upbeat music by composer Allister Brimble. Although a relatively small release by the standards of blockbuster platformers like Sonic, it was well received and has retained a fan base which considers it an excellent example of the genre.

== Remaster ==
A high-definition version of the game, Superfrog HD, was co-developed by both Team17 and TickTockGames, formerly Bubball Systems, the company initially responsible for the MS-DOS port of Superfrog in 1994. It was released in 2013 for the PlayStation 3, PlayStation Vita, OS X, Linux and Microsoft Windows via Steam, then in 2014 for Android, and iOS.

In May 2016, Superfrog HD was removed from digital stores by Team17, it was removed from PSN, Steam, App Store and Google Play. There is no known official statement by Team17 why it was removed, but possible reasons may include low sales or expired licenses. At the same time, the original Superfrog game was also removed from GOG.com.
