= Allister Brimble =

British video game music composer

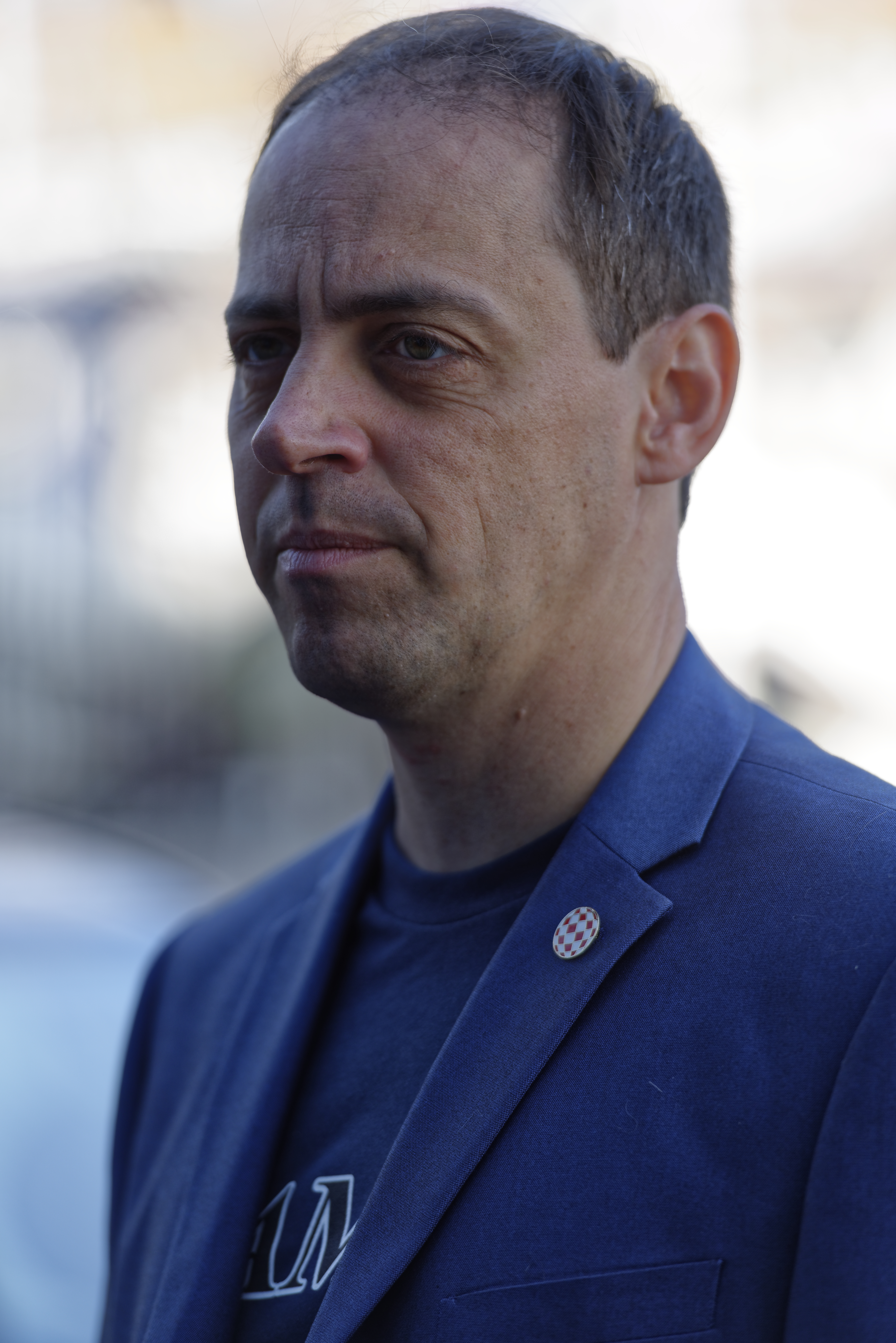
- Brimble in 2015

Background information
- Genres: Electronic, soundtrack
- Occupations: Composer, sound designer
- Years active: 1987–present
- Website: allisterbrimble.com

Allister Brimble is a British video game composer and sound designer who has worked in the video game industry since the 1980s. His early work includes music for Amiga games developed by Team17, such as Alien Breed, Project-X and Superfrog. His later credits include music for Driver, Driver 2 and the RollerCoaster Tycoon series.

== Career ==
Brimble began creating music in the 1980s and submitted early compositions to 17 Bit Software, whose members later helped form Team17 in 1990. He worked as a freelance composer for game companies including Codemasters and Team17, creating music and sound for titles such as Alien Breed, Project-X and Superfrog.

Brimble later composed for PC and console games, including Screamer, Driver and Driver 2. His work also included music for RollerCoaster Tycoon and RollerCoaster Tycoon 2.

Brimble continued working across music and sound design in later years, with credits including Fluidity, Overload, Andro Dunos II and Beyond the Ice Palace II. In 2014, he released The Amiga Works, a collection of newly produced versions of music from his earlier Amiga projects.

== Selected video game credits ==
"OpenRCT2 Main Theme" by Allister Brimble

| Year | Title | Role |
|---|---|---|
| 1987 | Thunderbirds | Music |
| 1991 | Alien Breed | Music and sound |
| 1991 | Full Contact | Music and sound effects |
| 1992 | Assassin | Music and sound effects |
| 1992 | Project-X | Music and sound effects |
| 1992 | Linus Spacehead's Cosmic Crusade | Music and sound effects |
| 1993 | Mortal Kombat | Music for several home versions |
| 1993 | Superfrog | Music |
| 1995 | Screamer | Music |
| 1995 | UFO: Enemy Unknown | Additional music and music conversion for the PlayStation version |
| 1999 | Driver | In-game music |
| 1999 | RollerCoaster Tycoon | Music and sound |
| 2000 | Driver 2 | In-game music |
| 2002 | RollerCoaster Tycoon 2 | Music and sound |
| 2010 | Sonic & Sega All-Stars Racing | Music and music conversion |
| 2010 | Fluidity | Music and sound design |
| 2012 | Fluidity: Spin Cycle | Music and sound design |
| 2018 | Overload | Music |
| 2022 | Andro Dunos II | Music |
| 2023 | OpenRCT2 | Main theme music |
| 2024 | The Plucky Squire | Sound design |
| 2025 | Beyond the Ice Palace II | Music |
| 2026 | Project X: Light Years | Additional music |

== Selected discography ==
| Year | Title | Notes |
|---|---|---|
| 2000 | Merregnon, Volume 1 | Composer, two tracks |
| 2004 | Merregnon, Volume 2 | Composer, two tracks |
| 2014 | The Amiga Works | |
| 2015 | The Spectrum Works | |
| 2016 | The Galway Works | With Martin Galway |
| 2017 | David Whittaker Amiga Works | With David Whittaker |
| 2020 | 8-Bit Symphony Pro: First Half | Editing, mixing and mastering |
| 2020 | Driver 20th Anniversary | |
| 2022 | Andro Dunos II (Original Soundtrack) | |
| 2025 | Amiga 40 | |
