= Team17 =

British video game company

Team 17 Digital Limited
- Type: Subsidiary
- Industry: Video games
- Predecessors: 17-Bit Software; Team 7
- Founded: 7 December 1990; 35 years ago
- Founders: Michael Robinson; Martyn Brown; Debbie Bestwick; Andreas Tadic; Rico Holmes; Peter Tuleby
- Headquarters: Wakefield, England
- Number of locations: 2 studios
- Key people: Mike Delves (head of studios)
- Number of employees: 200 (2019)
- Parent: Everplay (2018–present)
- Subsidiaries: Mouldy Toof Studios; Yippee Entertainment; Team17 USA; Cover 6 Studios
- Website: team17.com

Team 17 Digital Limited (Team17) is a British video game developer and publisher based in Wakefield, England. The venture was created in December 1990 through the merger of British publisher 17-Bit Software and Swedish developer Team 7. At the time, the two companies consisted of and were led by Michael Robinson, Martyn Brown and Debbie Bestwick, and Andreas Tadic, Rico Holmes and Peter Tuleby, respectively. Bestwick later became Team17's chief executive officer until 1 January 2024. After its first game, Full Contact (1991) for the Amiga, the studio followed up with multiple number-one releases on that platform and saw major success with Andy Davidson's Worms in 1995, the resulting franchise of which still remains as the company's primary development output, having developed over 20 entries in it.

Through a management buyout performed by Bestwick, both Robinson and Brown departed from Team17 in 2010, leaving Bestwick as the sole manager. In 2013, Team17 initiated a publishing venture focusing on indie games. The first game to release of this venture was Light (2013). Following a large investment from Lloyds Development Capital in September 2016, Team17 sought corporate expansion through various actions, including the acquisition of Mouldy Toof Studios, the developer behind Team17-published The Escapists (2015), and the hiring of multiple new key staff. In May 2018, the company was organized under the Team17 Group (later renamed Everplay), which became a public company listed on the Alternative Investment Market, valued around £230 million. As of 2019, Team17 employs 200 people across its three offices in Wakefield, Manchester and Nottingham.

== History ==
=== Early history (1990–1995) ===
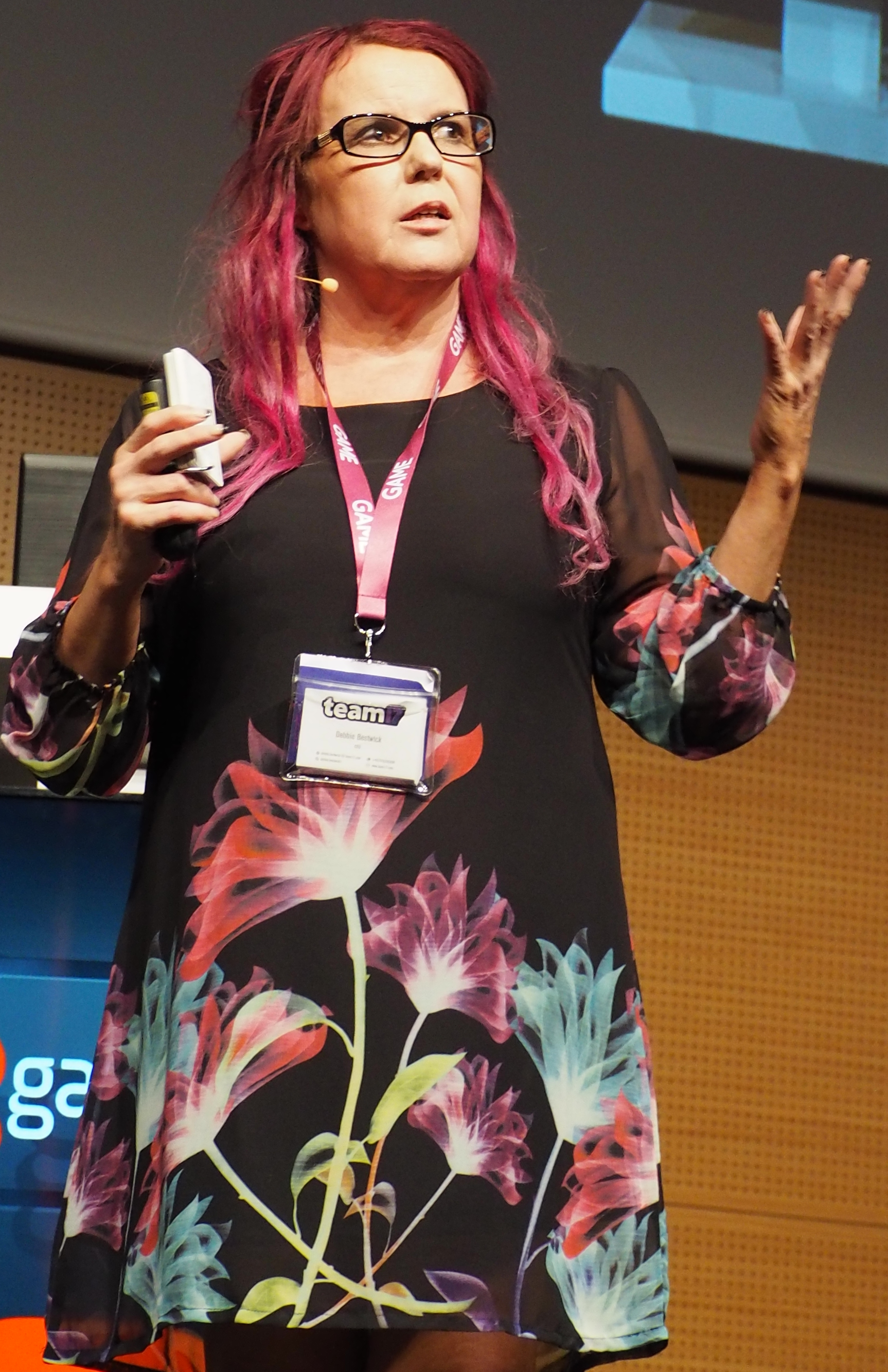
Debbie Bestwick (pictured in 2018) co-founded the company in 1990 and led it as CEO until January 1, 2024.

In 1990, Wakefield-based entrepreneur Michael Robinson was the manager of Microbyte, a United Kingdom-wide computer retail chain, and 17-Bit Software, a video game publisher. Robinson had created 17-Bit Software as part of Microbyte in 1987 specifically to seek young, independent video game developers whose games he could publish through this label and distribute through his Microbyte stores. One of those developers was Andreas Tadic (a nineteen-year-old hobbyist programmer from Olofström, Sweden), who at the time was developing HalfBright, a shoot 'em up for Amiga systems. According to Tadic, the game was "technically impressive, but shite-looking". Martyn Brown, a Microbyte employee, called up Tadic to introduce him to artist Rico Holmes; Tadic and Holmes subsequently became friends and, alongside another Swedish programmer, Peter Tuleby, founded a development team known as Team 7.

Team 7's first game was Miami Chase, a Miami Vice-inspired racing game that was published by Codemasters in 1990, as a budget title for Amiga systems, and received an 82% review score from British Amiga-centric magazine Amiga Power. Brown had followed the game's development closely, because of which he suggested to Robinson that they should not only publish but also develop games at 17-Bit Software, using Team 7 as their internal development team and himself as project manager. Robinson agreed to undergo the venture and moved Debbie Bestwick from her position as sales manager of Microbyte to commercial support for 17-Bit Software. Eventually, 17-Bit Software and Team 7 agreed to formally merge into one team, amalgamating the two teams' names as "Team17". Team17 was officially created on 7 December 1990.

Using Microbyte's experience in game retailing, Team17 was able to easily determine game genres that would sell well, while Team 7's expertise in game development enabled Team17 to also develop games in those genres. Their first game was 1991's Full Contact, a fighting game that, upon release, reached the top spot on British game sales charts. Further Team17 games followed Full Contact's success; by 1993, 90% of the studio's games, including Alien Breed (1991), Project-X (1992) and Superfrog (1993), reached the top spot on sales charts, while all Team17 products combined generated half of all Amiga game sales. At the 1993 Golden Joystick Awards, Team17 and Electronic Arts jointly received the "Software House of the Year" award.

Starting in 1992, Future Publishing-owned Amiga Power started criticising Team17's products more harshly than other gaming magazines. According to Stuart Campbell, deputy editor for the magazine at the time, Overdrive, Project-X, F17 Challenge and Superfrog were among the games that received negative reception from Amiga Power between 1992 and 1993. As a response to their reviews, Team17 began implementing derogatory Easter eggs into their games, which included the cheat code "AMIGAPOWER" unlocking a critical statement regarding the magazine's review policy in Alien Breed II: The Horror Continues (1993) and the easiest-difficulty bot opponents in Arcade Pool (1994) being named after Amiga Power staff. However, when the magazine awarded Team17's ATR: All Terrain Racing and Kingpin: Arcade Sports Bowling scores of 38% and 47%, respectively, in 1995, Team17 issued a lawsuit against the magazine, demanding the reviews to be retracted and the issue withdrawn from sale. The lawsuit was not successful for the studio, and it instead turned to not sending review copies of their games to Amiga Power and making other Future Publishing-owned magazines not lend their review copies to Amiga Power.

=== Worms (1994–2010) ===
In 1994, programmer Andy Davidson created Artillery, a game in the artillery game genre, for Amiga systems. He entered the game, under the title Wormage or Total Wormage, into a contest held by the Amiga Format magazine. The game failed to make an impact, wherefore Davidson instead opted to take it to the 1994 European Computer Trade Show (ECTS) in London, where he presented it to people at Team17's booth, where the game was signed for development as a commercial title. Bestwick stated they could not stop playing the game and as such realised that the game had potential, although that potential's dimensions were yet unknown. Following the deal struck between the two parties, Team17 promptly lost Davidson's contact details and were forced to call Amiga Format to retrieve them. Once they had retrieved his details, Team17 and Davidson started to jointly develop a commercial version of his game, though retitled Worms, a title that appeared more straightforward.

At the time, Team17 had the strong feeling that the games market for Amiga was dying, therefore they decided to develop Worms across as many platforms as possible. However, the company had no publishing experience outside the Amiga market and needed to seek a third-party publisher; given the choice between Ocean Software and Virgin Interactive, they chose to go with Ocean Software. Worms was released in 1995 for Amiga and later ported to Sega Mega Drive, Super Nintendo Entertainment System, MS-DOS, PlayStation, among various other platforms. Out of the 60,000 total sales estimated by Ocean Software before the game's release, the game shipped millions of copies within its first year. Bestwick considered the game to have saved Team17. However, following the game's success, Team17 became obsessed with replicating it: Between 1995 and 2010, the studio released a total of sixteen new Worms games. With Team17 turning into a "single intellectual property company", many developers felt fatigue and "creative stagnation".

=== Restructuring and expansion (2010–2018) ===
In August 2010, Team17 announced that they had turned away from third-party publishers in favour of releasing their games themselves via digital distribution. The company hired Paul Bray and Alan Perrie to act as finance and operations director, and head of global marketing, respectively. Later that year, Team17 underwent a large internal restructuring, which included the management buyout of co-founders Brown and Robinson, making Bestwick, as chief executive officer, the company's sole manager. Bestwick stated that this move had "placed the company in a secure position for the future". Brown announced his departure in February 2011, stating that he would join handheld game developer Double Eleven.

In December 2011, Team17 acquired Iguana Entertainment, a company founded by Jason Falcus and Darren Falcus in 2009. All Iguana staff, including its founders, were effectively absorbed into Team17's Wakefield offices. In 2013, Bestwick and Bray sparked the idea of returning Team17 to its roots by adding an indie game publishing component to the company. An incubation programme was run that tasked two studios to co-develop what would later become Beyond Eyes (2015) and Sheltered (2016). Light by Brighton-based Just a Pixel became the first game to be announced and released through Team17's new venture. The activity was broadened to mobile game publishing in March 2014, with Hay Ewe by Rocket Rainbow announced to have been slated for a release on iOS in the second quarter of that year. To accommodate the publishing label's growth, Team17 opened a separate publishing office in Nottingham in May 2014. Bestwick stated that she despised the term "publisher" and preferred "label", as "[t]he term 'publisher' represents a way of doing business that's completely at odds with the new world of digital distribution". Team17 won the "Publishing Hero" award at 2015's Develop Awards.

One of the label's most successful titles was The Escapists: The game, designed by Chris Davis, a former roofer and founder of Derby-based Mouldy Toof Studios, sold over a million copies within one year of release. On 1 September 2016, Lloyds Development Capital (LDC), the private equity division of Lloyds Banking Group, announced that they had invested £16.5 million into the development of Team17. In return, LDC was awarded a 33% stake in Team17. Using the investment, Team17 acquired Mouldy Toof Studios and The Escapists franchise for an undisclosed sum. In response to LDC's investment, Chris van der Kuyl of 4J Studios joined Team17 as non-executive chairman. As means of further corporate expansion, Team17 hired multiple new management staff by January 2017, including Justin Berenbaum as head of publishing and business development for Asia and the Americas, Matt Benson as business development manager and Ste Stanley as marketing and sales coordinator.

=== IPO and management troubles (2018–present) ===
In March 2018, Team17 tasked stockbrokers from Berenberg and GCA Altium to prepare an initial public offering (IPO), valuing Team17 at £200 million. The company confirmed its intent to become a public company on 8 May 2018, announcing that a 50% stake of a new holding company, Team17 Group, would be sold over the Alternative Investment Market (AIM), a sub-market of the London Stock Exchange. The flotation was expected to value the group between £200 million and £230 million. Bestwick and LDC would each sell half of their shareholdings in the process, wherein Bestwick was expected to receive £50 million in windfall profit. Chris Bell, formerly the chief executive of Ladbrokes Coral, was appointed chairman of Team17 Group to aid the IPO process. At this time, the company employed 120 people in the Wakefield development studio and another 20 in the Nottingham publishing offices. Team17 was expected to gain £107.5 million in gross profits based on 27,325,482 new shares and 37,849,200 existing shares. The shares became available for purchase via the AIM on 23 May 2018. Following the sale of shareholdings by Bestwick and LDC, they retained 22.2% and 16.6% stake ownerships in the company, respectively.

Through the first half of 2019, Team17's revenue rose significantly; 83% of its revenue was attributed to its publishing activities, of which 80% stemmed from games Team17 had co-developed internally. Notably successful were Hell Let Loose and My Time at Portia, which were the best-performing games for the company in that time frame. Team17 Group announced that, with this funding, it would be looking into acquiring more development studios. The company's headcount also increased from 154 to 182 in that period, because of which Team17 moved its headquarters to new offices within Wakefield in November 2019. The number of staff further increased to 200 by the end of the year. In September 2019, Martin Hellawell was appointed a non-executive director of Team17 Group.

In January 2020, Team17 acquired the Manchester-based developer Yippee Entertainment for £1.4 million, a combination of £922,407 in cash and 114,000 consideration shares, worth £433,200. The company bought out Golf with Your Friends, which it had published, from developers Blacklight Interactive in January 2021, planning to release further downloadable content (DLC) for it. In July 2021, Team17 Group acquired StoryToys, a developer of edutainment apps, for $26.5 million. In January 2022, Team17 Group acquired Astragon, a German publisher focused on simulation video games, for £83 million. In the same month, it also acquired The Label, a San Francisco–based video game publisher focusing on video game subscriptions and known for publishing What the Golf?, eventually renaming the company Team17 USA. Michael Pattison was hired to lead Team17 as CEO in October 2021. In June 2023, Team17 bought the rights for Hell Let Loose from the original developers Black Matter and founded a new studio named Cover 6 Studios to develop the game alongside Manchester-based Expression Games.

In early 2022, Team17 announced MetaWorms, a non-fungible token (NFT) project, to sell procedurally generated images of characters from Worms as digitally owned objects on a blockchain. The reaction to this project was swift and negative; the company cancelled it after multiple game development studios it had partnered with in the past, including Ghost Town Games, Playtonic and Aggro Crab, condemned the project and vowed not to work with the publisher again. Eurogamer reported that many employees were unaware of the project and were blindsided by its announcement, including the social media team, which suffered online abuse and harassment from the public. Others who had knowledge of the project voiced their opposition to NFTs but were ignored by upper management, which went forward anyway.

The conflict between management and employees over MetaWorms also revealed long-term complaints over low pay, long overtime hours, and increasing workloads since the company's 2018 IPO. Under pressure to sign and clear more publishing deals, various teams, including quality assurance (QA) and user research felt that products were being shipped in an incomplete, rushed, or buggy state due to the time crunch. Staff felt underpaid relative to the salaries of equivalent roles at other studios and some complained of unpaid overtime work. They also pointed to their year-end bonus being cut in 2021 despite the company announcing a record profit that year. Another source of conflict was the human resources (HR) department, which was accused of covering for sexual harassers and manipulating the company's reviews on Glassdoor, a job search website. They likewise took issue with Bestwick's management as CEO, for being a major source of overtime pressure and for turning a blind eye to harassment in the company. Fanbyte corroborated these testimonies in its own reporting.

Pattison acknowledged the reports and committed to addressing the issues with underpay, overtime, and harassment in a company-wide meeting in February 2022. In March 2023, Team17 announced a realignment that resulted in the redundancy of employees from the art and design teams as part of the company's focus on publishing and third-party development. Later that month, Bestwick announced that she intended to step down as CEO once a replacement is found. She would transition to a non-executive role while remaining on the board of directors. Steve Bell, the former CEO of the marketing agency Iris, joined the board in September 2023 and replaced Bestwick as the CEO on 1 January 2024.

In October 2023, Team17 laid off 50 jobs from the company's QA, usability, programming, and marketing teams as part of a restructuring effort. Pattison also left the company. Team17 Group rebranded as Everplay to better reflect its structure composed of Team17, StoryToys, and Astragon.
