= Scorched Tanks =

1994 video game

- Developer: Dark Unicorn Productions
- Publisher: Dark Unicorn Productions
- Producer: Shane Monroe
- Designer: Michael P. Welch
- Composer: Eric Gieseke
- Platform: Amiga
- Release: 1994
- Genre: Artillery
- Modes: Single-player, multiplayer

Scorched Tanks is an artillery style game released for the Amiga platform in 1994. The game is inspired by the MS-DOS game Scorched Earth (1991).

== Gameplay ==
Between two and four human and computer-controlled opponents each control one stationary tank in a two-dimensional playfield of randomly generated mountainous terrain. The aim of the game is to destroy the other tanks by shooting, utilizing indirect fire.

The final version of the game has 70 weapons and 13 types of shield, ranging from simple to the elaborate. Players purchase equipment before each round, and bonus cash is awarded for dealing damage to opponents.

Weapons include the Liquid Nitrogen, which fills like a liquid and deals damage to tanks before it evaporates, Crimson Flood, which triggers a series of explosions that cover terrain and deals damage to tanks in the path of the explosions, Crazy 8s, which bounces unpredictably around the target, Mega Nuke, which obliterates any tanks in its blast radius, and the Grab Bag, which fires either a random weapon worth more than $4,000 or a 'blank'. Many weapons specifically destroy, create, move or ignore terrain.

Shields include the inexpensive Absorb, which absorbs damage, the Magnetic shield which deflects incoming warheads (at three different levels, from a gentle nudge to seriously altering the inbound trajectory), the X-tinguisher which absorbs most weapons that make a direct hit and puts them into the target's own inventory, the Detonator, which triggers dangerous weapons safely out of range, and Feedback, which reflects incoming direct hits directly back where they came from.

== Development ==
Scorched Tanks was developed by Dark Unicorn Productions. Dark Unicorn's membership also included Seumas McNally, after whom the Independent Games Festival's Seumas McNally Grand Prize is named. Scorched Tanks was written with AMOS Professional.

Version 0.50 added shields and improved graphics. Version 0.70 added music and several new weapons. Version 0.95 added parachutes, the Lava weapon and the Liquid Nitrogen weapon. Version 1.00 added computer controlled opponents and four new weapons: the Scatter Shot, Firecracker, Super Zapper, and Chain Reaction.

Version 1.15 added tank movement, new shield types and support for Amigas with only 512KB of chip RAM. Version 1.20 added the Crimson Flood weapon as well as configuration options, including settings for wind and explosion size. Version 1.75 added twenty new weapons, the Displacer and Feedback shield types, new death sequences, tank sliding, music by Eric "Sidewinder" Gieseke, and various minor improvements.

Versions 1.85 and 1.90 added new music by Sidewinder, added 10 new weapons bringing the total to 70, and improved some graphics, including options for 16 and 64 colour graphics modes. Version 1.85 was uploaded to Aminet on 13 April 1995. Version 1.90 was made available to registered users only at the same time, and unlocked the load/save game function added in version 1.80 and the option to play more than five rounds.

The author intended to bring the game's total to 100 weapons, but did not release another Amiga version of the game. However, the author later released a Scorched Tanks clone for Windows, Mac and iOS named Pocket Tanks, which including expansion packs features 325 weapons in all (last 2020 version of the game).

== Reception ==
The One reviewed Scorched Tanks as part of a 17-Bit Software compilation in July 1994, saying "you'll definitely have a good time ... my all-time favourite PD game".

Amiga Computing chose Scorched Tanks as their PD Game of the Month in September 1994, describing it as "a brilliant title, especially with two or more players ... Highly recommended."

Amiga Power reviewed the game in September 1994 and included it on their coverdisk: they commented that while the style of the game wasn't novel, the range of features included was impressive. Their survey of readers' favourite games in November 1994 ranked Scorched Tanks at number 42, ahead of many commercial games.

US magazine Amazing Computing also reviewed the game in September 1994: "While Scorched Tanks is elementary in concept, its depth of play will keep you coming back again and again."

== Legacy ==
Mike Welch, Scorched Tanks' author went on to produce Pocket Tanks, a simpler clone of Scorched Tanks for Windows, MacOS, iOS, Windows Store, and Android. It bears many similarities to its predecessor.
