= Seumas McNally =

Canadian video game designer (1979–2000)

- New Year's Eve photograph of Seumas McNally
- Born: February 10, 1979; New Zealand
- Died: March 21, 2000 (aged 21); Toronto, Ontario, Canada
- Occupation: Video game designer
- Years active: 1993–2000
- Notable credits: DX-Ball; Rival Ball; DX-Ball 2; Tiger's Bane; Tread Marks

Seumas McNally (February 10, 1979 – March 21, 2000) was a Canadian video game programmer and designer. He is best known for his development of indie games and computer software, including DX-Ball 2 and Tread Marks, the latter earning him the Grand Prize at the Independent Games Festival (IGF) in 2000. The same award was posthumously renamed in his honour the following year, subsequent to his death after a three-year long battle against Hodgkin's lymphoma.

== Career ==
McNally's first published video game was a side-scrolling helicopter shooter titled Tiger's Bane, programmed on the Amiga. Previously known as a demo by the name Flying Tigers, the game went live on November 11, 1997, published through Aminet. The same year, Seumas formed the software development company Longbow Digital Arts (also known as Longbow Games), working together with his father, Jim McNally (game designer), his mother, Wendy McNally (lead artist) and his brother, Philippe McNally (3D artist). The company released DX-Ball 2 in 1998, a sequel to the 1996 cult-classic PC game DX-Ball by Michael P. Welch, while simultaneously working on the 3D terrain tank-racing game Tread Marks, which was released in 2000. While DX-Ball 2 had accumulated more than 5 million downloads by the end of 2002, Tread Marks won three Independent Games Festival Awards for "Best Game", "Best Design" and "Best Programming". Other products McNally programmed include Particle Fire, a screensaver exhibiting a fiery display of flexuously moving particles; Texturizer, for creating seamless textures; and WebProcessor, for creating fast HTML macros.

=== DX-Ball ===
McNally is credited for visual contribution to the original DX-Ball by Michael P. Welch (creator of Pocket Tanks), a freeware computer game for the PC first released in 1996. The game, originally based on an earlier series of Amiga games known as MegaBall, is patterned after classic ball-and-paddle arcade games such as Breakout and Arkanoid. DX-Ball has been succeeded by four follow-ups: DX-Ball 2 (1998), Rival Ball (2001), Super DX-Ball (2004) and DX-Ball 2: 20th Anniversary Edition (2018).

=== DX-Ball 2 ===
Developed by Longbow Digital Arts as a derivation of the original DX-Ball, DX-Ball 2 introduced the feature of board-set selection, allowing the player to pick between various sets of boards to play. The free demo came packed with a total of 24 boards divided into 6 board-sets of 4 boards each. Additional board packs could then be purchased and installed for more boards, whereas the initial Board Pack 1 expansion would extend the demo board-sets into full sets of 25 boards each, summing a total of 150 boards. While a total of five board packs were released for the game, DX-Ball 2 was later succeeded by Rival Ball in 2001.

== Illness and death ==
McNally was diagnosed in 1997 with Hodgkin's lymphoma, a type of blood cancer, at the age of 18. McNally died on March 21, 2000, shortly after winning the grand prize for Tread Marks.

== Legacy ==
McNally's family continued to operate Longbow Digital Arts following his death, primarily focusing on casual games. The company later announced the development of a historical wargame in 2005, the basic design drafts of which McNally's father had helped to formulate. It was released in 2010 as Hegemony: Philip of Macedon and became the first entry in a series of historical wargames. Longbow Games' product catalogue has since expanded with the additions of Golem, a 3D puzzle-adventure game, and a "20th Anniversary Edition" of DX-Ball 2, which were both released in 2018.
