= Tread Marks =

2000 video game

- Original author: Seumas McNally
- Developer: Longbow Digital Arts
- Initial release: 14 January 2000; 26 years ago
- Stable release: 1.7.0 / 20 January 2017; 9 years ago
- Operating system: Windows
- Platform: Microsoft Windows
- Type: Single Player, Online Multiplayer Tank Combat/Racing
- License: GPLv3
- Website: http://www.treadmarks.com (archived at the Internet Archive)
- Repository: github.com/LongbowGames/TreadMarks

Tread Marks is a 3D, third-person perspective, multiplayer-focused tank combat and racing computer game developed by independent video game developer Longbow Digital Arts. The game won the 2000 Independent Games Festival grand prize, later renamed to the Seumas McNally Grand Prize in honor of the game's lead programmer Seumas McNally who died on 21 March 2000, after receiving the award. A notable feature of the game is fully deformable terrain.

== Gameplay ==
The tanks come in two varieties: steel and liquid. The steel tanks resemble real-life tanks, while the liquid types are whimsical fantasy tanks. Weapons and power-ups are scattered around the maps, and range in destructive power from light machine guns to tactical nuclear missiles.

The game features three gameplay modes:

- Race mode, in which tanks must race around an off-road course while attempting to stop other tanks from completing the course. Common techniques include using the in-game weapons to attack opponents and using physical tank contact to temporarily 'push' opponents off the course.
- Battle mode (deathmatch, or DM), in which the tank or team with the most kills win as soon as the global kill or time limit is reached.
- Capture the Flag mode (CTF) in which there are two or more teams of tanks that compete by trying to capture one of the other team's flags.

The race and battle modes can be played in either team or single-player mode. Tread Marks can be played over a LAN, or over the Internet and includes a program for running a dedicated game server, which lists the computer it runs from on the master server. The master server in turn is operated by Longbow Digital Arts from a location in Toronto, Ontario, Canada. Many modifications can be found online, including new maps, tanks, and weapons.

== History ==
=== Development ===
The game was developed by Seumas McNally and uses OpenGL to render its 3D graphics and the Miles Sound System for positional sound. A notable feature is the in-game deformable terrain which doesn't harm performance. For instance, a nuclear missile explosion creates a huge black crater in the terrain, while its "opposite", the Matterbomb, creates a huge mountain on the terrain. For the in-game deformable terrain a Binary-Triangle Tree-based dynamic view dependent level of detail height field renderer was utilized.

=== Open sourcing ===
On January 20, 2017 the game was released as freeware and the source code as open-source under the GPLv3 license on GitHub. For enhanced cross platform portability, the Miles Sound System was replaced with OpenAL, and the platform dependent Win32 API code with SFML and Qt. A port to Linux and MacOS is in progress. In September 2017 a version for the Linux-based OpenPandora was released.

== Reception ==
Reception

Aggregate score
Aggregator	Score
GameRankings	74%

Review scores
Publication	Score
Computer Games Strategy Plus	4/5
EP Daily	8.5/10
GameFan	80%
GameStar	67%
IGN	6.9/10
PC Accelerator	7/10
PC Zone	56%

At the time of release, the game received above-average reviews according to the review aggregation website GameRankings.

It won the 2000 Independent Games Festival grand prize, later renamed to the Seumas McNally Grand Prize in honor of the game's lead programmer who died on 21 March 2000, after receiving the award. It was also nominated for the "Best Independent PC Game" award at The Electric Playground's Blister Awards 2000, which went to Combat Mission: Beyond Overlord.
