= Neon Wars =

2006 video game

- Developer(s): Blitwise Productions
- Designer(s): Richard Phipps and Michael P. Welch
- Platform(s): Windows
- Release: October 24, 2006
- Genre(s): Arcade Shooter
- Mode(s): Single player

Neon Wars is a one player arcade style abstract shooter created by American studio Blitwise Productions. Players pilot a ship in square-shaped field where enemy ships that the player must destroy while not being destroyed themselves by them randomly spawn, and attempt to survive as long as possible. Visually, the game utilizes neon visuals, sharp contrasts, and bright colors. The game has a demo version, which includes only the first zone (level), the Blue Zone, and time-limited versions of the next two zones, Turquoise and Green. The "Deluxe" includes seven zones, a special mode called Level Challenge and more powerups.

== See also ==
- Pocket Tanks
- Super DX-Ball
