= Longbow Games =

Canadian video game developer

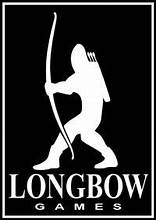
- Formerly: Longbow Digital Arts
- Company type: Private
- Industry: Video games
- Founded: 1997; 29 years ago
- Founder: Seumas McNally
- Headquarters: Toronto, Canada
- Key people: Rob McConnel (CEO); Jim McNally (executive chairman)
- Website: longbowgames.com

Longbow Games is a Canadian video game developer based in Toronto. It was founded in 1997 by Seumas McNally.

== History ==
Longbow Games was established in 1997 as Longbow Digital Arts by Seumas McNally. In 2000, the company's tank combat game Tread Marks won the top award at the Independent Games Festival. Shortly thereafter, McNally died of Hodgkin lymphoma aged 21. The Independent Games Festival renamed its grand prize in his honour. Since then, Longbow has been run by McNally's family's father Jim, mother Wendy, and brother Philippe. In 2012, the company had seven employees and an intern, otherwise outsourcing tasks to subcontractors.

== Projects ==
Hegemony: Philip of Macedon was a pet project of Jim McNally, who became interested in Philip while researching Alexander the Great and discovering that it was actually his father who had developed the troop types, tactics and infrastructure that enabled Alexander's invasion of the Persian Empire. In hindsight, the early arcade games Longbow produced were mere stepping stones to the more in-depth real-time strategy games of the Hegemony series. In 2018, Longbow released the puzzle-adventure game Golem.

== Finances ==
A bottleneck has been financing, since independence from publishing firms meant being forced to rely on self-funding. However, as Longbow developed the game engine for Hegemony from scratch, it was eligible to receive research and development credit from the government. An export fund for sending Canadian companies abroad to promote their games supported Longbow to visit trade shows. With its title Hegemony Rome: The Rise of Caesar, Longbow attempted Steam Early Access to gain player feedback in 2013/14. In 2014/15, Longbow launched a crowdfunding campaign via Kickstarter for its next strategy title, Hegemony III: Clash of the Ancients, but raised only a fraction of its CA$30,000 goal.

== Games ==
- DX-Ball 2 – a sequel to the brick-buster classic DX-Ball by Michael P. Welch, released in 1998.
- Tread Marks – a tank racing wargame, released in 2000.
- Rival Ball – a sequel to DX-Ball 2 with head-to-head multiplayer, released in 2001.
- Triangle Trifle – a match-3 game inspired by Tetris, released in 2002.
- Stone Cutter – a meditative tile-matching game, released in 2003.
- Rival Ball Tournament – a sequel to Rival Ball with live head-to-head multiplayer, released in 2004.
- Hegemony – a strategy game series, which was started in 2010.
- Golem – a fantasy platform game, which was released in 2018.
- DX-Ball 2: 20th Anniversary Edition – a modernised update of DX-Ball 2, released in 2018.
