= Golem (2018 video game) =

- Developer: Longbow Games
- Publisher: Longbow Games
- Platform: Microsoft Windows
- Release: WW: 29 May 2018
- Genre: Puzzle Adventure
- Mode: Single-player

Golem is a single-player adventure developed by Longbow Games about a young girl and a shape-shifting golem who must navigate the ruins of an ancient tower to solve its ever more challenging puzzles and re-activate its long-dormant machines. It was released 29 May 2018.

== Gameplay ==
In Golem, the player is tasked to explore 10 levels that unfold within an ancient mysterious tower. By using several abilities given by five forms, the golem can solve various puzzles found there.

== Reception ==
Golem met a positive reception with 75% Metacritic score based on 6 reviews. Adventure Gamers gave a 4.5/5 stars rating and said, "Golem is fun little puzzle-platformer with a top-notch presentation both in sound and art direction." However, when the game was released, there were a few issues with the game controls.
