= DX-Ball 2 =

1998 video game

- Developer: Longbow Digital Arts
- Publisher: Longbow Digital Arts
- Designer: Seumas McNally
- Composer: Eric "Sidewinder" Gieseke
- Platform: Windows
- Release: December 16, 1998
- Genre: Breakout clone
- Modes: single-player; multiplayer

DX-Ball 2 is a 1998 Breakout clone action game (Note: Action elements in this game include rapid explosions, a wide variety of sound effects, and fast-paced gameplay on higher difficulty levels which requires reaction time. These are more prominent in the 20th anniversary remake) for Microsoft Windows, developed and published by Longbow Games. As a follow-up to the 1996 cult-classic DX-Ball by Michael P. Welch, the sequel introduced a number of improvements to the original game, including high-colour textured graphics, an original soundtrack by Eric "Sidewinder" Gieseke, multiple board-sets with distinct visual styles, and a hotseat multiplayer mode. On November 21, 2018, the game was re-released and remastered on Steam as DX-Ball 2: 20th Anniversary Edition, commemorating the game's 20th anniversary, while also ensuring compatibility with more recent versions of Windows. The anniversary edition introduced high-definition graphics, widescreen gameplay with a selection of new widescreen board-sets, additional power-ups, online leaderboards, and a board-set editor for creating custom board-sets. Following the release of the anniversary edition on Steam, distribution of the original demo version of DX-Ball 2 via the Longbow Games website was discontinued, alongside sales of the game's original board pack expansions.

== Gameplay ==
Based on the concept of Atari's arcade installment Breakout, the gameplay of DX-Ball 2 follows the generic formula of the brick buster genre. Using the computer mouse, the player moves a paddle across the bottom of the screen, which is used to launch off a ball into a confined field of bricks, clearing the bricks as the ball bounces into them. Some bricks will take multiple hits before they clear, while other bricks will be invisible, explosive or appear unbreakable. Certain bricks eject a random power-up into the playing field when hit, which the player then may choose to catch with the paddle, or avoid, depending on the specific power-up and its effect in the game. As the ball bounces back towards the bottom of the screen, the player must steer the paddle to bounce the ball back up again. If the player misses the ball and there are no additional balls in play, the paddle will explode, penalising the player a spare paddle. Clearing all bricks on the screen that can be cleared will allow the player to proceed to the next board in the board-set. The game will end either after all paddles are lost, or after all the boards in the selected board-set have been completed.

== Development ==
Programmed by Seumas McNally, DX-Ball 2 was first released on December 16, 1998. The game was an updated version of the classic DX-Ball by Michael P. Welch, on which Seumas had contributed some of the graphical assets. (Note: For Seumas McNally's involvement with the original DX-Ball, see that game's opening credits.) With the advantage of running in high colour mode, DX-Ball 2 presented a notable upgrade from its predecessor in the visual aspect, delivering more vibrant graphics with textured bricks and backgrounds, additive blended explosion effects and real-time ray traced balls. Also unique to DX-Ball 2 was the ability to select between multiple board-sets to play, enhancing the gameplay experience with varying themes and distinct visual styles. Additionally, the game featured two new power-ups: one enlarging the ball, and an eight ball split power-up; a kid's mode with adjusted game settings for easier gameplay; and a euro-techno soundtrack by Eric "Sidewinder" Gieseke.

The free demo version of DX-Ball 2 introduced a selection of 24 boards to play, divided into six board-sets, each containing 4 boards. By purchasing the additional Board Pack 1 expansion, the initial demo board-sets could be expanded into complete sets of 25 boards each, adding up to a total of 150 boards. Following up on June 13, 1999, Board Pack 2 and the Classic Pack were announced. Both expansions sported 150 new boards, Board Pack 2 featuring four board-sets of 25 boards and one board-set of 50 boards, while the Classic Pack reintroduced the 50 classic boards from the original DX-Ball by Michael P. Welch, in addition to two new sets of 50 boards, both in the same classic DX-Ball style. Following Seumas McNally's passing on March 21, 2000, Longbow Games announced a delayed Board Pack 3 on May 19, 2000, introducing another 150 boards across one board-set of 50 boards and four board-sets of 25 boards, while a commemorating Memorial Pack followed two months later, on July 19, 2000. Encompassing 176 boards, the fifth and last game expansion for DX-Ball 2 included two board-sets of 25 boards each, an alphabet board-set of 26 boards, and a dedicated memorial board-set of 100 boards.

=== Playmachine.net ===
Following the launch of Playmachine.net, an online video arcade operated through the web browser, a specialised version of DX-Ball 2 was made exclusively for the service, announced on August 27, 1999. Utilising ActiveX to connect a game through the web browser, Playmachine.net allowed its users to purchase virtual tokens, which could then be exchanged to play games and compete on the service's own leaderboards. As such, the arcade version of DX-Ball 2 would automatically upload the player's score online, with listings for top 30 of the week and top 30 of all time. Shortly after its launch, Playmachine.net also held a high score contest for DX-Ball 2, where players could compete to win a Nintendo 64.

=== Boxed version ===
Released on November 24, 2000, a boxed CD edition of DX-Ball 2 was made available for North American consumers, published by Tri Synergy and retailed through Babbage's, Software ETC and Game Stop. The decision to publish a boxed version of the game was foremost in response to public requests for a gift option, while it also served as an experiment for Longbow Games to evaluate its ability to self-publish into regular retail channels. The boxed CD featured the game itself, Board Pack 1, the Music Pack, and the alphabet board-set from Memorial Pack as an added bonus, summing up a total of 176 boards.

=== DX-Ball 2: 20th Anniversary Edition ===
On August 23, 2018, Longbow Games announced DX-Ball 2: 20th Anniversary Edition, an updated relaunch of DX-Ball 2 that would be coming to Steam in the fall. The new edition of the game was released on November 21, 2018, presented in a high-definition widescreen format featuring new boards, online leaderboards, and a board-set editor to create and play custom board-sets. With the release of the Steam version of the game, the legacy game download that was distributed on Longbow Games’ official website has since been discontinued, alongside the sale of Board Pack 3 and the Memorial Pack as they have yet to be remastered.

== Music ==
The music in DX-Ball 2 was written by Eric Gieseke, also known as Sidewinder. (Note: For the author of the music in DX-Ball 2, see the game's opening credits and title screen.) The complete soundtrack contains 15 songs in a melodic euro-techno style, with various branches and influences ranging from hardcore, techno, breakbeat, jazz, house, and rock. Initially, the game came bundled with only 4 tracks, encompassing three title screen songs and a high score theme. However, with the release of DX-Ball 2 version 1.2, support was added for in-game music. While this allowed for the three title screen songs to be played back in-game, a separate free Music Pack was simultaneously made available for download, adding 11 new songs to the game. In time, the contents of the Music Pack were eventually incorporated into the game's demo installer, while the separate download was discontinued.

In occasion of the release of DX-Ball 2: 20th Anniversary Edition, Sidewinder also released an EP, DX-Ball 2 Sound Selection, featuring new recreated studio versions of the game's initial 4 tracks. Released on December 14, 2018, the EP was made available for streaming on YouTube, and for digital download on Bandcamp, also marking Sidewinder's first official release in nearly twenty years, following the album 2BadSheep in 1999.

== Reception ==
DX-Ball 2 was met with an overall positive reception from both editors and players. Games Domain reviewer Zack Schiel praised it for addictive gameplay, and noted it as the "best-looking Breakout game ever made". However, he also noted that the "overall graphics [were] not up to today's retail standards". ZDNet rated the game 5/5 stars. According to Longbow Games itself, DX-Ball 2 had accumulated more than 5 million downloads by the end of 2002. The anniversary edition has been listed in The Gamer's list of Top 10 Games With The Best Anniversary Editions.

== Successor ==
As a spiritual sequel to DX-Ball 2, Longbow Games released Rival Ball in 2001. While the new title recycled the engine of DX-Ball 2, it also introduced many new features, including a buttoned layout with cursor-based navigation; two new power-ups (replacing two older ones); new graphics for the power-ups; new square shaped bricks; 4 difficulty modes; new sound effects and music; and 1-on-1 split screen network play. In addition, it also featured the ability to set timers, randomise board order and repeat board sets, also including support for DX-Ball 2 boards.
