= Hegemony Gold: Wars of Ancient Greece =

2010 strategy video game

- Developer: Longbow Games
- Publisher: Longbow Games
- Series: Hegemony
- Platform: Microsoft Windows
- Release: Hegemony: Philip of Macedon: WW: 11 May 2010; Hegemony Gold: Wars of Ancient Greece: WW: 23 February 2011
- Genre: Real-time strategy
- Mode: Single-player

Hegemony Gold: Wars of Ancient Greece is a real-time strategy game developed and published by Canadian studio Longbow Digital Arts Inc. It began as Hegemony: Philip of Macedon which revolved around the campaigns of Philip II of Macedon. It was originally released on Windows on 11 May 2010. It was updated as Hegemony Gold: Wars of Ancient Greece on 23 February 2011 which added scenarios set in the Peloponnesian War. The game features simultaneous real-time tactical battles and real-time strategic empire management, with a focus on the logistics and planning of military campaigns. It was followed by Hegemony Rome: The Rise of Caesar in May 2014 and Hegemony III: Clash of the Ancients in August 2015. A DLC for Clash, The Eagle King, was released in February 2017.

== Reception ==
According to Steam user reviews the game has a "very positive" rating. GameStar reported that Hegemony: Phillip of Macedon offered "Demanding Real-time Grand Strategy" and gave a 73/100 rating, despite the game's graphics not achieving high standards. Strategy games magazine Armchair General gave Hegemony Gold a rating of 93/100. Furthermore PC Masters rated the game with 84%, Destructoid 75% und GamingXP 70%.
