= Scorched 3D =

2001 video game

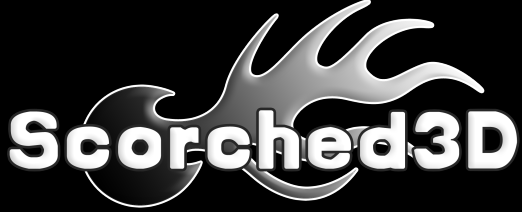
- Original author: Gavin Camp
- Initial release: 29 April 2001; 24 years ago
- Stable release: 43.3d (stable) / 4 March 2012; 13 years ago
- Preview release: 44 / 1 August 2014; 11 years ago
- Repository: sourceforge.net/projects/scorched3d
- Written in: C++
- Platform: Windows, OS X, Linux, Unix; (wxWidgets)
- Type: Single Player, Hotseat, Multiplayer, Cooperative gameplay, LAN Real-time, Turn-based Strategy, Artillery game
- License: GPL-2.0-or-later
- Website: www.scorched3d.co.uk

Scorched 3D is a free and open source artillery game modeled after the MS-DOS game Scorched Earth. Scorched 3D is licensed under the GNU GPL-2.0-or-later, and supports numerous platforms: Windows, Unix-like systems (Linux, FreeBSD, OS X, and Solaris). It makes use of both the Simple DirectMedia Library and wxWidgets.

== Gameplay and mechanics ==
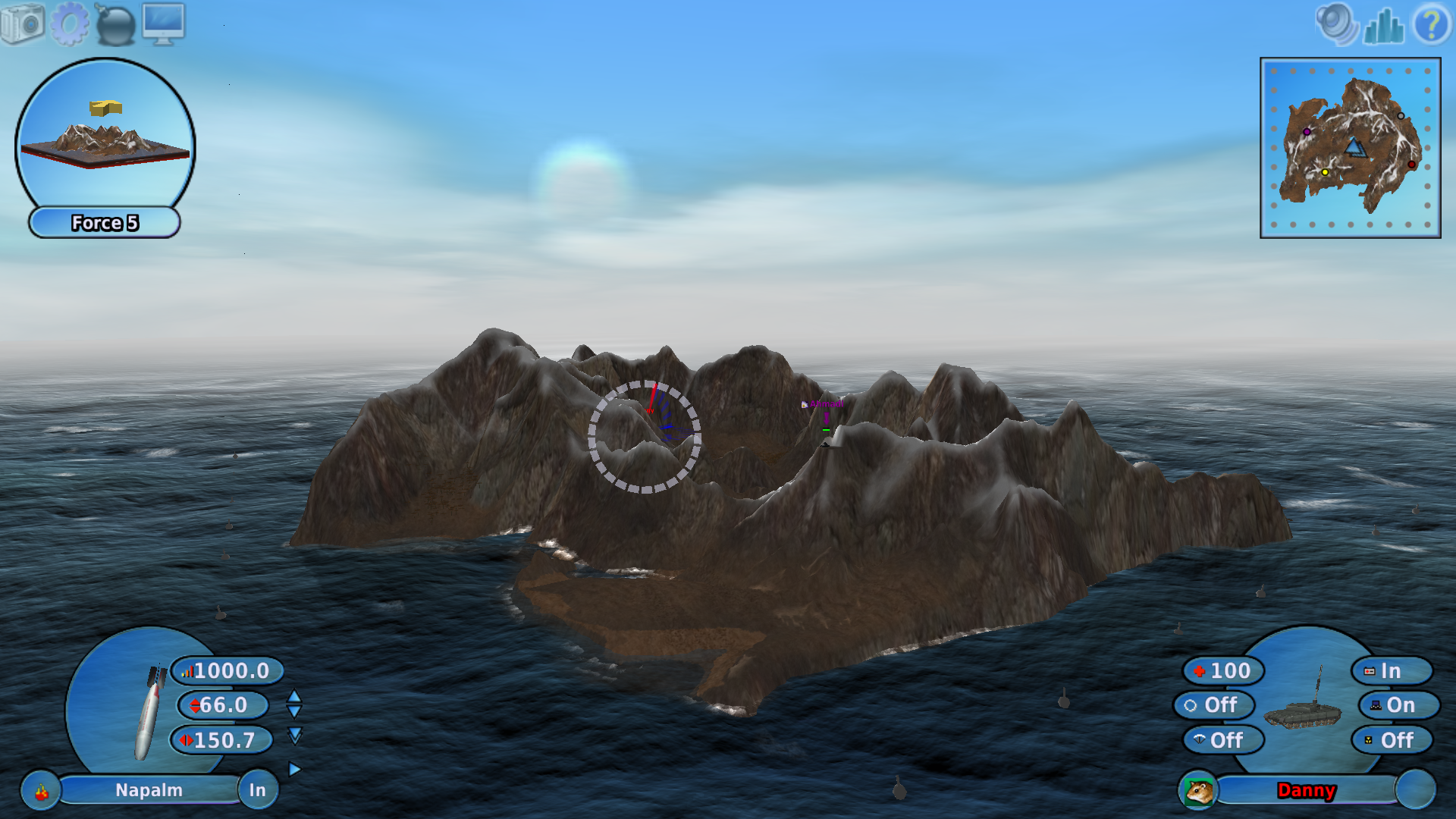
A screenshot of Scorched 3D V43.3d

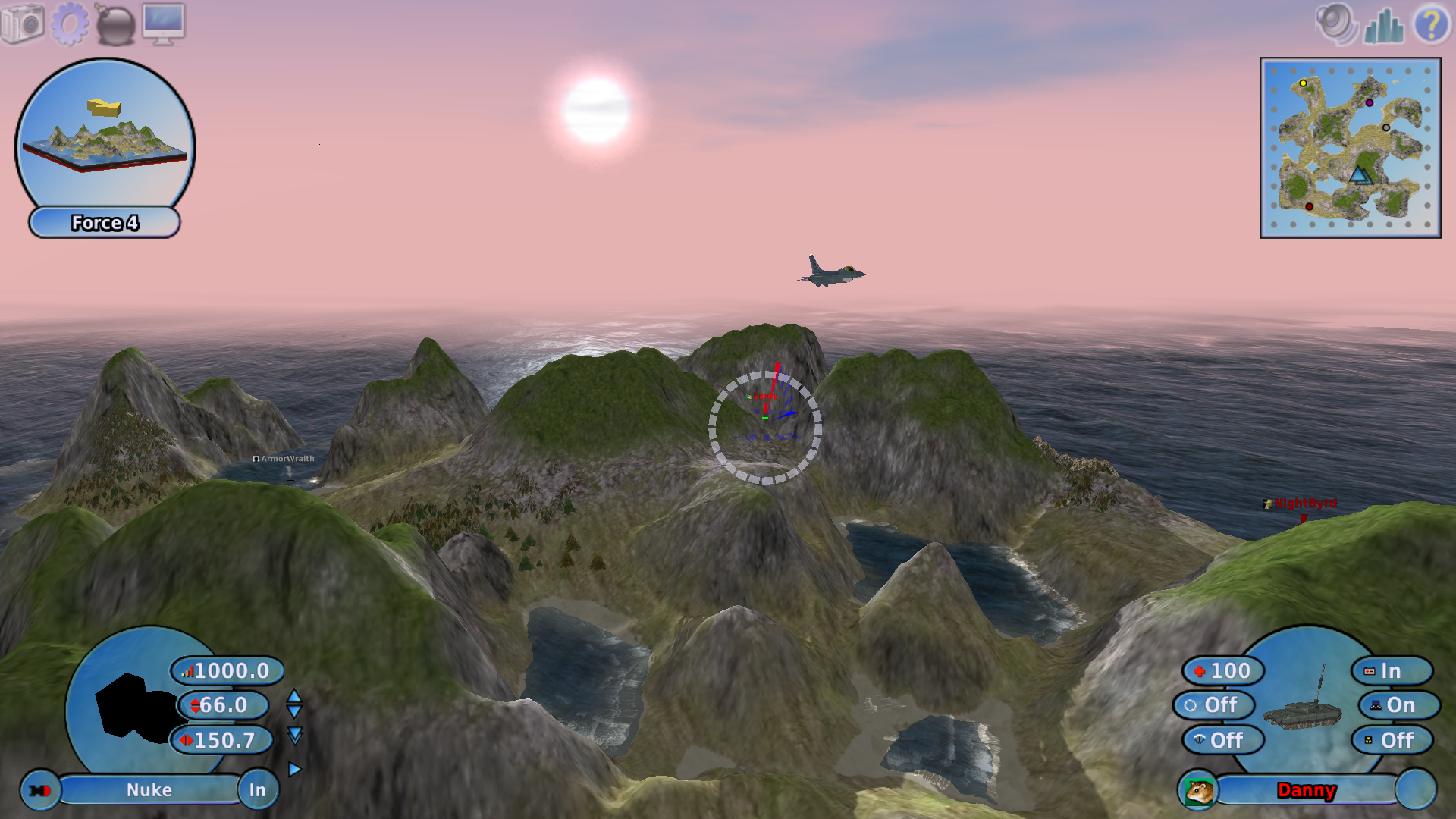
A screenshot of Scorched 3D V43.3d

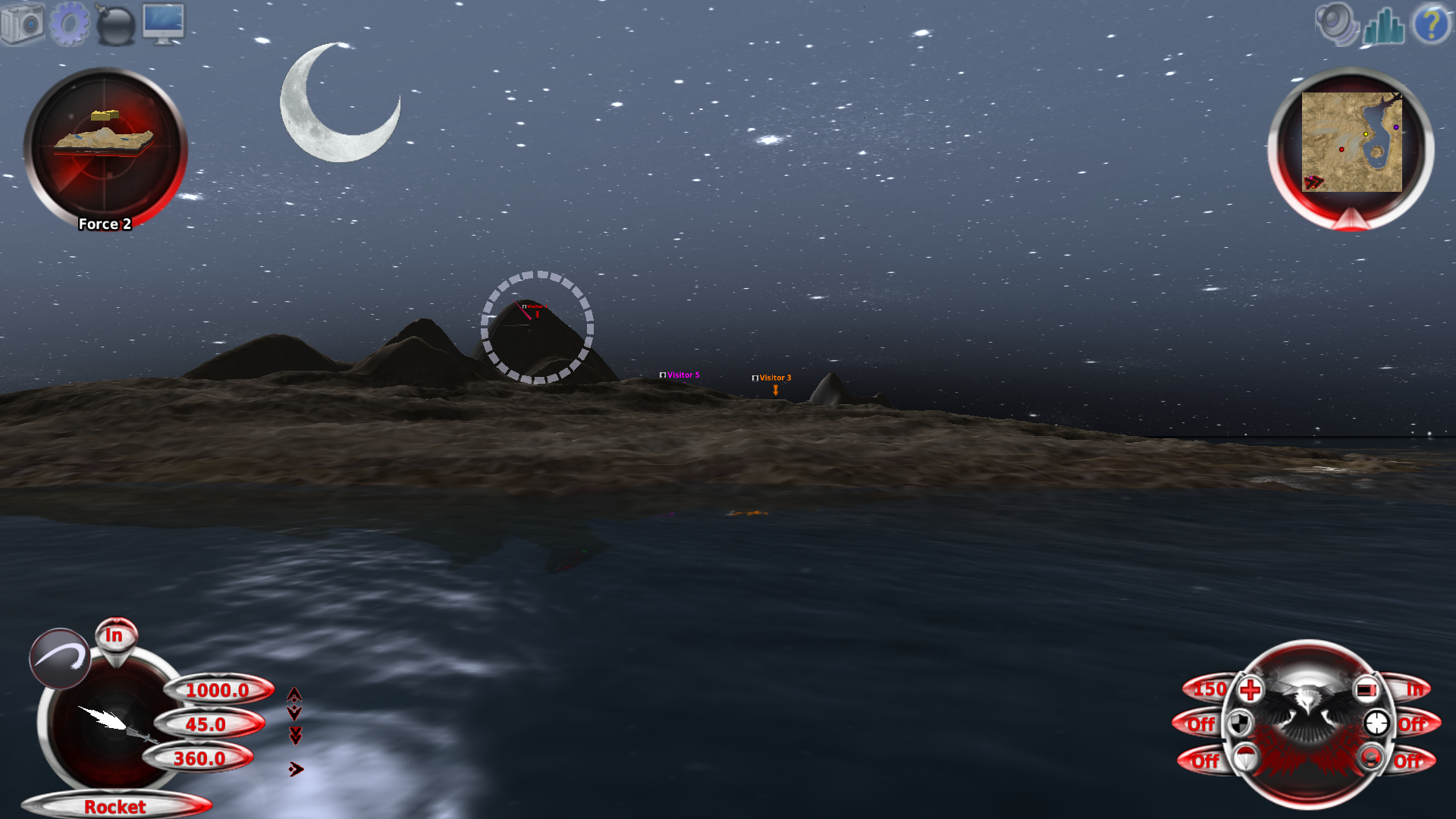
A screenshot of AWE Mod V44Beta

Scorched 3D tasks players with destroying enemy tanks using different weapon systems, defense systems, gadgets, and maneuvers.

At the beginning of each round, AI and player controlled tanks are randomly situated on a 3D landscape. Players then launch weapons at enemy tanks by gradually adjusting their tank's angle, rotation, and power. They may also equip shields and use defensive gadgets or countermeasures based on their current landscape position. To win, a player must kill a majority of the enemy tanks by the end of 10 rounds and have the highest score. Extra score and rewards are given for surviving the end of a round.

The game also features an economy. Players may earn money each round by damaging or killing enemy tanks and structures. The player can then use their funds to buy additional weapons, gadgets, defenses and fuel before the next round. Every shield and weapon has its own use, and each has a variety of different strengths and weaknesses. Players can influence the economy by purchasing weapons and upgrades. The economy will fluctuate based on player buying patterns.

The default mode adheres to the original gameplay formula of Scorched Earth. Most of the weapons from the first game are featured in a 3D visual, and include offensive weapons and defensive gadgets.

Offensive weapons:

- The Funky Bomb
- The Death's Head
- Land hugging explosive Rollers
- Dirt destroying missiles
- Tank incinerating napalm
- Nuclear weapons
- Mountain piercing lasers
- Multiple warhead MIRVs

Defensive gadgets:

- Batteries allow a player to repair their damaged tank.
- Shields protect a player's tank from being damaged or destroyed. Magnetic shields and Force Shields repel and reflect incoming enemy weapons.
- Parachutes prevent damage from falling (when dirt is blasted out from under a tank).
- Fuel allows a player to move their tank across the 3D landscape, and is used to avoid incoming enemy weapons, attack an enemy position, scramble to cover, or to gain a more advantageous firing position.

=== Community mods ===
Scorched 3D is user modifiable, and various community mods are available.

=== Player statistics and ranking ===
Example of forum medals

Scorched 3D allows players to view and gain stats and medals that are displayed in the scorched3d.co.uk forums. These stats appear if the player has registered their username at the forum and have linked their in game Player ID via the website's User Control Panel. Accumulated scores are based on skill, deaths, kills, and rank. The higher the rank number, the less skilled, or less active a player generally is.

Medals are gained through winning tournaments and destroying the most enemy tanks by the end of the season.

== History ==
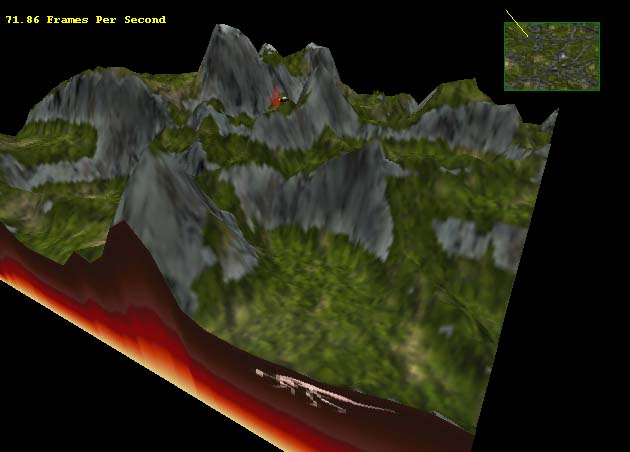
Scorched 3D v1.0 terrain generator

The first build was created in April 2001 by lead developer Gavin Camp. The inspiration behind Scorched 3D was revealed in an interview with him on The O'Reilly Network:

Scorched Earth was an institution for me and my friends at university. On many nights we would play the game while drinking — though it is pretty good even without the drink. Recently on a boring flight I played it with friends for eight hours straight; we hardly noticed the time passing. I thought that Scorched in 3D would allow many more game concepts, and [would] also combine my love of 3D graphics with the classic game.

Scorched 3D originally started as a 3D landscape generator before it was eventually converted into a game. The project is currently being hosted by SourceForge.net.

The latest public release version is 44.

One of the unofficial forks has released a version 44.2 on March 1, 2025 (9 months ago). This version includes patches from multiple Linux distributions used in their packages between 2014 and 2024. It fixes a few runtime issues, and is buildable and playable on Linux at the time of the release. Binary packages for Linux are available from an Open Build Service repository mentioned in the README.md file.

== Reception ==
The game was downloaded over 2.2 million times via SourceForge.net between 2003 and May 2017. A 2004 review in German print magazine LinuxUser was favorable. In 2005 an O'Reilly article on "Open Source Mac Gaming" recommended Scorched 3D.
