= Rival Ball =

2001 video game

- The logo for Rival Ball, as presented on its website
- Developer: Longbow Digital Arts
- Publisher: Longbow Digital Arts
- Programmers: Tom Hubina; Rob McConnell
- Composer: SideWinder
- Platforms: Windows, Macintosh
- Release: March 19, 2001
- Genre: Breakout clone
- Modes: Single-player, multiplayer

Rival Ball is the sequel to the PC Breakout clone DX-Ball 2 from Longbow Digital Arts. Released on March 19, 2001, the game features square bricks and online split-screen multiplayer. It introduces a cursor-based layout with buttons for navigation, two new power-ups, the ability to save and resume games, and game options for randomising board order, setting timers, repeating board-sets, and choosing between four difficulty levels. The game also plays all the original DX-Ball 2 boards. A Mac version was announced on April 3, 2002. Rival Ball was the first game from Longbow Games to succeed the passing of Seumas McNally (1979–2000), the company's founder and lead programmer. Rival Ball was followed by Rival Ball Tournament in 2004.

== Gameplay ==
The object of the game is to clear a field of bricks using a paddle and a ball. Most bricks are cleared upon impact with the ball, while some bricks may take multiple hits, be invisible, blast surrounding bricks, or appear unbreakable. Once all breakable bricks on the board have been cleared, the player advances to the next board. As bricks are being cleared, power-ups will frequently launch onto the screen (see Power-ups). The player may choose to catch these with the paddle, which in turn will bring about various effects in the game. For instance, some power-ups may speed up the brick-breaking process by introducing laser guns and explosives into play, while others may affect the difficulty by shrinking the paddle and speeding up the ball.

=== Standard game ===
Standard Game offers the classic brick busting experience. The player may select a desired set of boards to play, whereas the game initially comes with two freeware board-sets of 4 boards each. As an added bonus, Rival Ball also includes the six demo board-sets from DX-Ball 2, with support for the five respective board packs from the game. Before a game starts, the player may set additional game options, including difficulty, time limits, randomised board order, and board-set repeat. The difficulty levels range from Easy to Medium, Hard and Impossible, and will determine several factors for the game. As the game's default setting, Medium implies a standard game with no specific alterations. On the other hand, Easy lets the player start with a big ball and expanded paddle, with the paddle size being fixed to not contract beyond the initial width. Easy also excludes three of the game's Power-Ups, including Death, Tiny Ball and Mega Shrink. If the chosen difficulty is Hard, the game starts with the regular paddle size, but a small ball. While the paddle cannot be expanded beyond its initial width in this mode, the ball can only grow to its regular size. Hard is also the only difficulty setting to introduce timed power-ups, where the effects from Blitz Ball, Laser, Fire Ball, Ice Ball and Catch are only temporary. The last difficulty setting is Impossible. While all power-ups are absent in this mode, the game starts with the most narrow paddle size and a tiny ball fixed at the highest speed. The additional game options are optional and can be used in conjunction with one another. By enabling Time Limit, the player may compete against the clock with settings of 5, 10, 15, 20 and 30 minutes to complete a board-set. Random Boards will randomise the order of the boards in the chosen board-set. Lastly, Repeat Board-Set will repeat the total set of boards up to ten times in a row. When the player has completed a board, a Board Bonus will be added to the total score. Constituted by three elements, the player may earn a 'Balls Left' bonus rewarding 50 points for each additional ball left on the screen; a 'Perfect Ball' bonus rewarding 500 points if no balls were lost during the board; and a 'Perfect Brick' bonus of 250 points if all bricks were cleared. In addition to the Board Bonus, the completion of a board-set will also be summarised by a Set Bonus, consisting of a 'Paddles' bonus rewarding 250 points for each remaining paddle left; a 'Perfect Bricks' bonus rewarding 3000 points if all bricks were cleared across the entire set; and a secondary 'Perfect Ball' bonus rewarding 4,000 points if the board-set was completed without losing a single ball. Aside from single player, Standard Game also features a Hot-Seat multiplayer mode. In this mode, players take turns to clear a board-set, playing through the same boards successively, while competing to achieve the highest score. Turns are changed either when one player completes a board or loses a life, and the game goes on until all players have either finished the board-set or lost all spare paddles.

=== Network game ===
As the core concept of the game, Network Game is what puts the "Rival" in Rival Ball. With a 1-on-1 split-screen multiplayer mode, the majority of the game's board-sets are specifically designed to mirror horizontally at the middle of the screen. While these boards may be played in their entirety in a standard game, a horizontal bar will split the screen in a network game, dividing the boards into two equal parts. The local player will then be busting bricks on the lower part of the board, while the progress of their opponent will be reflected on the upper half of the screen. To get started with the online gaming, the game features a lobby where players may gather to host and join games. Communications can also be conducted via sending messages or creating a chat room.

Screenshot of the online lobby, illustrating a list of players on the left, with player stats and details about hosted games on the right.

Upon the first visit online, the player is automatically connected to the game's default game room. A prompt is then made to create an online account by defining a username and a password. This is kept on the game's server to record the player's number of wins, losses and quits, and their rank. Alternatively, players can create and host their own hidden or public game rooms, operating as a server for other players to join. However, online accounts and their corresponding stats are limited to the specific game rooms that they were created within.

Once the player is connected and logged in, a game may be hosted for others to join; or the player may choose to join a game hosted by someone else. Initially, only one of the game's two board-sets can be played online, as Rival Ball Split is the only board-set which features mirrored split-screen boards. On the other hand, owners of the full version and Rival Ball Series 2 will have a variety of board-sets to choose from (see Board packs); although, these can only be joined by players who have the respective boards installed. Once a game has been hosted, a green check mark will appear next to the player's username in the lobby, indicating that a game is ready to be joined. Incidentally, online games do not feature additional game options, aside from setting the difficulty of the hosted game. When playing against an opponent, the object of the game is simply to score the most points. The concept of having spare paddles and losing in-game does not apply for online games, so the loss of a paddle will only result in a short delay and revert the effects of any active power-ups. As with standard games, the completion of a board will award the player a Board Bonus, giving a slight advantage to the player who first clears the board. However, the final Set Bonus does not apply for online games. Once the board-set has been completed, the player with the highest score is deemed the winner, and the result is added to the stats of each player respectively. If a player chooses to quit during a game, the forfeit will be added to their quits. However, no win is recorded for the other player.

== Power-ups ==
The game features a total of twenty power-ups, which may cause a variety of effects in the game. While the majority of these are direct clones from DX-Ball 2, Ice Ball and Chain Lightning are two new additions, replacing Falling Bricks and Level Warp. Also, unlike in DX-Ball 2, the ball size of small balls and big balls can be restored to its default medium size, when catching the Big Ball and Tiny Ball power-ups, respectively. However, the Fire Ball and Ice Ball power-ups will always come into effect and remain as big balls, regardless of any conditions. The difficulty setting will determine which power-ups are available during the game and how they behave (see Standard Game). The names in parentheses indicate previous names as used in DX-Ball and DX-Ball 2

Life (Extra Life)
Gives the player a spare paddle, increasing the number of attempts to play by one. Will also revert the effects from Catch and Laser.
Blitz Ball (Thru Brick)
Enhances the ball behaviour, allowing it to break through any type of bricks on its path. Will also affect Laser, and may be combined with Fire Ball and Ice Ball.
Laser (Shooting Paddle)
Equips the paddle with two laser guns, allowing the player to fire at bricks. May be enhanced by Fire Ball, Ice Ball and Blitz Ball, separately and combined.
Fire Ball
Transforms the ball into an explosive fireball, allowing it to smash any type of bricks, also affecting adjacent pieces. Will also affect Laser, and may be combined with Blitz Ball.
Dynamite (Set-Off Exploding)
Detonates all explosive bricks on the board.
Multiply (Expand Exploding)
Expands all explosive bricks to the most adjacent field.
Catch (Grab Paddle)
Equips the paddle with an electromagnet, allowing it to catch and hold any number of balls.
Neutralize (Zap Bricks)
Neutralises all unbreakable, multi-hit and hidden bricks, turning them into regular bricks that can be cleared by one hit.
Speed Up (Fast Ball)
Speeds up the ball to its maximum speed.

Slow Down (Slow Ball)
Slows the ball down to its minimum speed and reverts it to the normal state.
Mega Shrink (Super Shrink)
Poisons the paddle so that it shrinks to its minimum size.
Tiny Ball (Shrink Ball)
Shrinks the ball one size down, making it harder to spot.
Death (Kill Paddle)
Destroys the paddle upon impact, reducing the number of attempts to play by one.
Chain Lightning
Unleashes multiple lightning strikes on the board, destroying random clusters of bricks.
Ice Ball
Transforms the ball into a glowing blue ice ball, with the same effect as Fire Ball. Will also affect Laser, and may be combined with Blitz Ball.
Stretch (Expand Paddle)
Expands the paddle width by one size.
Shrink (Shrink Paddle)
Shortens the paddle width by one size.
Big Ball (Mega Ball)
Increases the size of all balls in play by one unit.
Multi Ball (Split Ball)
Multiplies the number of balls in play by two.
8-Ball (Eight Ball)
Splits one ball into eight balls, launching them out in all directions at full speed.

== Development ==
Initially released on March 19, 2001, Rival Ball was presented as a sequel to DX-Ball 2, adding a new branch to the DX-Ball series as a spiritual successor by Longbow Digital Arts. Based upon the same engine as DX-Ball 2, the game recycles many of the original elements and programming by Seumas McNally (1979-2000). (Note: See the game's readme file for programming credits; version history; documentation for in-game music; and game credits.) While the gameplay and design essentially remained the same, Rival Ball featured a cursor-based layout with buttons for navigation; new graphics for the power-ups; board designs with square shaped bricks; new sound effects; a new soundtrack; four difficulty settings and options to set timers, randomise board order and repeat board-sets; and most significantly: split-screen network play. The game was also ported to the Mac (requires CarbonLib 1.4 or later on Mac OS 8.6 or later), with the Mac version announced on April 3, 2002. Notably, while the Mac version is known as Rival Ball version 2.0, the port is identical to the outdated version 1.3 for the PC, and does not feature the online lobby.

=== Compatibility updates ===
To ensure compatibility with Windows Vista, version 1.5.5 was released on May 28, 2007. The update also installs MCEWrapper.exe for support under Windows XP Media Center Edition, and renewed the game's icon with a glowing blue ball. Inconspicuously, the software installer had also been changed to NSIS. However, this update was later discovered to cause a compatibility issue with Windows 9x systems; hence a second update, version 1.5.6, was provided in December 2007, which solved the problem by installing ShFolder.dll with the game.

== Board packs ==
Screenshot from an online split-screen game, illustrating the mirrored design of the first board from the board-set Captive. (Note: The board-set is featured in the full version of Rival Ball.)

While Rival Ball comes with two freeware board-sets of four boards each, the full version of the game, also known as Rival Ball Series 1, adds eleven new board-sets with a total of 150 boards. With board designs by Jim and Wendy McNally, the base board pack features four board-sets of 20 boards for standard games, and seven board-sets of 10 boards with mirrored designs for online compatibility. In addition, the complementary Rival Ball Series 2 features 150 boards designed by Wendy McNally, sporting eleven new board-sets of which ten were designed for online action. In tradition with Wendy's style of board design, as seen in the board packs for DX-Ball 2, most of the board-sets play about artistic renditions of specific themes. For instance, the 20 boards of Villa feature a variety of decorative plant and flower designs made for standard games, while Fireflies takes the player through 10 boards of mirrored animal-oriented designs. Further, sporting the pun of allowing network play, Alpha-Net takes the player through the 26 letters of the alphabet, with correlating words spelling out. And to even out the number of total boards, Belts and Bucklets comes with 14 colourful split-screen waistbands. While some of the backgrounds presented with the board-sets can be very bright, the player can toggle the brightness in-game by pressing F1, ranging from bright to dimmed and off.

Notably, Rival Ball Series 1 and Rival Ball Series 2 can be installed and played independent of each other, as they are only considered expansion packs to the freeware version of the game. As an added bonus to the game, Rival Ball will also play the five DX Ball 2 board packs, if the player has any of these installed. However, in order for Rival Ball to be able to detect these boards, the directory of the DX-Ball 2 installation needs to be listed in the dirs.cfg document. If necessary, this file can be edited in Notepad, to add a new entry for the path where the DX-Ball 2 board packs have been installed on the hard drive.

== Soundtrack ==
As the same artist who wrote the songs featured in DX-Ball 2, Eric Gieseke provided seven tracks for Rival Ball under his handle SideWinder. The soundtrack spans an overall euro-techno sound, featuring melodic tunes with a notable influence of house and trance music. As the game supports module files of the MOD, XM and S3M formats, the player may customise the soundtrack by adding or removing tracks within the game's Mods subdirectory. However, only modules with up to 24 channels are supported. While the game is running, the player can easily skip between tracks or turn off the music by pressing F5 – the first press unloading the music, and the next press loading a new song. Incidentally, F6 can be pressed to adjust the game's volume, while pressing F8 will swap the stereo of all sound effects.

== Sequel ==
Rival Ball was succeeded by Rival Ball Tournament, released on April 29, 2004. Featuring true head-to-head gameplay, Rival Ball Tournament omits the split-screen design for a more competitive way of playing, similar to Pong. With an objective to destroy the most bricks to score the most points, the winner for each round can also be determined by factors such as goals scored, balls lost, and who shattered the last brick. Aside from sporting network play, with the ability spectate live games, one of the most prominent features of Rival Ball Tournament is the introduction of AI opponents, allowing single-player games to be enjoyed against the computer. Also unique to Rival Ball Tournament are the new board designs, here termed arenas, presenting a more free-form style with bricks of various shapes and sizes, as well as unbreakable obstacles like torches and towers.

Similar to Super DX-Ball, Rival Ball Tournament is intended as a separate spin-off to the main franchise, and therefore unrelated to both DX-Ball and DX-Ball 2, just as Super DX-Ball is unrelated to Rival Ball.
