= Hegemony (video game series) =

Video game series

- Genres: Real-time strategy, grand strategy
- Developer: Longbow Games
- Publisher: Longbow Games
- Platform: Windows
- First release: Hegemony: Philip of Macedon: WW: 11 May 2010
- Latest release: Hegemony III: Clash of the Ancients: WW: 25 August 2015

Hegemony is a series of computer strategy games developed by Canadian studio Longbow Games. The games combine historical grand strategy with real-time battles on a seamless map. The title references the concept of hegemony, i.e. the political, economic, or military predominance or control of one state over others.

== Gameplay ==
The games revolve around empire management, conquests and resource management with a focus on the planning of military campaigns. The player can zoom in and out at any time between a 2D strategy map and a 3D tactical map, while the game progresses in (pausable) real time. A unique mechanic is the creation of supply chains that connect to supply centres via the player's infrastructure, thus providing supplies for their armies. Designer Jim McNally recaps: "Hegemony sets itself apart by having all gameplay on one big continuous, satellite based, 3D map with a movement and supply system that focuses strategic and empire building decisions as the logical extensions of local geography." Besides historical scripted campaigns (e.g. Philip of Macedon, Julius Caesar, Pyrrhus of Epirus), the games include a sandbox mode, in which the goal is to collect "hegemony points". Victory may be achieved through a combination of cultural, military, and economic superiority.

=== Seamless Zoom ===
The Hegemony games feature a fully zoomable map that lets players direct troops and manage cities both on the grand strategic map as well as zoom in to the more granular tactical battlefield map to lead units into battle, individually defining their stances and manoeuvres. This provides a level of flow to warfare that is unique to the series and differentiates it from all other ancient wargames. On the tactical map troops are represented in 3D and can move freely through plains, rolling hills, deciduous forests, valleys, narrow passes and engage in battle. When zooming out, the game world will cross fade to the stylized board-game-like strategy map, where units, cities, and buildings are represented as fully interactive coloured miniatures and map markers display given objectives.

=== Unit Tactics ===
Tactical manoeuvring as well as positioning of units on a map dotted with rivers, river crossings and narrow valleys is key to warfare in Hegemony. A wide range of different units - phalanxes, legions, light and heavy cavalry - will try to flank each other or charge directly into the enemy battlelines. Each unit has a level of morale, food supply and strength to fulfill its special role in combat. The player can assign a stance to specialize a unit, usually at the cost of another attribute. In the later Hegemony games, units will gain experience which can be used to promote officers and upgrade the unit's abilities. High-tier officiers can even be drawn from the unit and create a new leader unit which moves independently across the battlefield or be assigned to govern a city.

=== Supply Lines ===
Hegemony effectively models the role of supply and logistics making management of the supply network the core of its game systems. Each city, resource node, camp and bridge can be connected into a large supply network that spans the player's empire and has a critical function to both the morale of its population and its armies. Supply affects each unit and city in two important ways. First each entity must maintain a sufficient level of supply if it is not to quickly lose morale, which might lead to rebellion or instantaneous disintegration on the battlefield. Secondly, cities need food to grow, they draw supply from their network of farms and on the other hand supply units in their vicinity. Once a unit is out of supply range, it might resupply itself from own supply trains or from raiding enemy supply trains and resource buildings. However, a weakened unit will also draw fresh recruits along the supply network from its home city or find itself at a disadvantage if faced with a fresh enemy. Since the supply network is an integral part of civilian management and military campaigns, the player will learn both to maintain his empire's flow of supplies and try to disrupt the enemy's supply lines.

=== Upgrades ===
Both cities and units can be upgraded to give significant boosts to their effectiveness. In a city the player may construct buildings for a cost in gold and wood that either give economic boosts or access to certain advanced unit types. Once units have acquired sufficient experience, officers can be promoted that either increase their combat strength in various ways or make them more economically efficient. Starting in Hegemony Rome also forts and bridges can be built in predetermined locations on the map. Upgrades are probably the element that most evolved from sequel to sequel as more upgrades and a more refined integration with game mechanics were introduced, culminating in the introduction of a skill tree in Hegemony III.

=== Adaptive Soundtrack ===
The soundtrack to Hegemony was written to be constantly evolving; in response to the level of intensity in gameplay, and randomly when gameplay is relatively static. It contains multiple themes; each with its own unique harmonic, melodic, and rhythmic content. These separate themes were written so that each can precede or follow any other theme seamlessly.

== Hegemony Gold: Wars of Ancient Greece ==
Hegemony Gold was based on Hegemony: Philip of Macedon, released on 5 December 2010, which was selected for the Penny Arcade Expo PAX10 Showcase for independent games. This first version was only released on the development studio's website and is no longer available.

Hegemony Gold was released on 30 March 2012. Set in ancient Greece, Hegemony Gold offers a sandbox mode with 26 factions, in addition to the Philip of Macedon campaign and campaigns for Sparta and Athens. The focus, however, clearly is on the narrative campaign which details the rise of Philip of Macedon, Alexander the Great's father, as he worked to build Macedon into a power able to take on the Persian Empire.

=== Reception ===
According to Steam user reviews the game has a "very positive" rating. GameStar reported that Hegemony: Phillip of Macedon offered "Demanding Real-time Grand Strategy" and gave a 73/100 rating, despite the game's graphics not achieving high standards. Strategy games magazine Armchair General gave Hegemony Gold a rating of 93/100. Furthermore, PC Masters rated the game with 84%, Destructoid 75% und GamingXP 70%. "Props has to go to Longbow games for creating a AAA title on what is probably less than a AAA budget."

== Hegemony Rome: The Rise of Caesar ==
Hegemony Rome: The Rise of Caesar was released on 15 May 2014. It has four campaigns which trace Caesar's path to the conquest of Gaul. Hegemony Rome introduces the ability to build field camps and set up fortified bridges to secure chokepoints and act as forward bases. In comparison to its prequel, it focuses on swift campaigning and big battles which were often a feature of the Gallic Wars.

=== Reception ===
Hegemony Rome was viewed as a less sophisticated successor to Hegemony Gold. The use of the same core game loop on a larger map without new mechanics contributed to the game's repetitiveness. Strategy Gamer rated it 6/10, noting "There is much to be said for Hegemony Rome, and sometimes simple problems do become more interesting if taken to a larger scale. But a truly great strategy game should never be this repetitive, even if the Romans did like their conquests nice and methodically predictable." At the same time strategy podcast Three Moves Ahead described the Caesar campaign as being close to reality and requiring interesting strategic decisions. However, Hooked Gamers reviewed the game much more positively with 82%: "[Hegemony Rome] throws out pretty much everything you thought you knew about Real-Time Strategy and then proceeds to - successfully - reinvent the genre altogether." Furthermore, GameWatcher rated the game 70% und GameSpot 50%.

== Hegemony III: Clash of the Ancients ==
Hegemony III: Clash of the Ancients was released on 25 August 2015. The player takes charge of one of 25 factions in Italy, before the rise of Rome, and attempts to unite the Italian Peninsula. In the base game the player may choose one faction from the Latin, Sabellic, Greek, Celtic or Etruscan faction groups. Hegemony III does away with the narrative campaign structure known from its prequels and goes for a sandbox approach with missions emerging organically as time goes on rather than as part of a set historical narrative (though the campaign comes back in the Eagle King DLC). It adds various features such as a military, economic and naval skill tree and victory conditions.

=== Reception ===
According to Steam user reviews Hegemony III has a "very positive" rating, though it initially had a mixed reception. Immediately after release and before the three shortly arriving patches, it was criticized for bugs and poor AI. Game Watcher gave it 6/10, stating "I wanted to like Hegemony III, but it was just too frustrating." On the other hand, WCCFtech rated it 7.8/10 and StrategyFront Gaming said "[it] is a complex and rewarding experience that can stand up to the likes of Total War." In Germany, players attested to its high replayability. In 2016, strategy game podcast Three Moves Ahead discussed how the game had not greatly evolved over time and how it could not offer the same gameplay options – regarding diplomacy or trade – that other strategy titles offered. However, later reviews were much more positive: "I highly recommend you try Hegemony III: Clash of the Ancients for yourself. It's an ambitious game with a unique focus (supply lines), combining economic management with a detailed wargame, set in a well-realized ancient world. It would be a shame if you, like me, waited too long before taking the plunge."

=== Expansions ===
An expansion, The Eagle King, was released on 16 February 2017. The Eagle King offers a campaign in which the player takes on the role of King Pyrrhus of Epirus launching an invasion of southern Italy to save the Greek city-states from the rising Roman Republic. Alternatively, the player can delve into a sandbox invasion. The map received an expansion to Sicily. This expansion was critically acclaimed; StrategyFront Gaming described it as a "return to form" for the series. It has been viewed as an important step towards further development of the series as whole.

== Ratings' Overview ==
Ratings of the series
Reviewer	Hegemony Gold	Hegemony Rome	Hegemony III
GameStar	73%		
Armchair General	93%		
PC Masters	84%		
Destructoid	75%		
GamingXP	70%		
Game Industry News	90%		
Strategy Gamer		60%	
Hooked Gamers		82%	
GameWatcher		70%	60%
GameSpot		50%	
WCCFTech			78%
Average	81%	66%	69%
Average Serie	74%		
Steam User-Rating (Number Reviews)	96% (183)	60% (437)	80% (473)
Average Serie	75%		
