= Scorched Earth (video game) =

1991 video game

- Developer: Wendell Hicken
- Platform: MS-DOS
- Release: 1991
- Genre: Artillery
- Modes: Single-player, multiplayer

Scorched Earth is a shareware artillery video game. It was released for MS-DOS in 1991, originally written by Wendell Hicken using Borland C++ and Turbo Assembler. Players control tanks to do turn-based battle in two-dimensional terrain, adjusting the angle and power of each tank turret before each shot. Scorched Earth adds destructible terrain and a variety of extreme weapons to the artillery formula.

It was inspired in the ZX Spectrum game Tanx created by Paul Stanley and published in 1983 as a type-in in the book "Sixty Programs for the Sinclair ZX Spectrum".

== Gameplay ==
Scorched Earth is one of many games in the genre of "turn-based artillery games". Such games are among the earliest computer games, with versions existing for mainframes with only teletype output. Scorched Earth, with a plethora of weapon types and power-ups, is considered the modern archetype of its format.

The game has a wide variety of customization options from gravity, wind, money, meteorite showers, and a similarly large pool of different payloads, allowing for a large amount of entirely different situations.

The AI players can display text messages before firing, such as "I shall smash your ugly tank!" and before dying, such as "Join the army, see the world they said".

A game in progress

The weapons range from small missile rounds to MIRV warheads to high-yield nuclear weapons. All weapons can be upgraded with tracers which allow the player to more accurately adjust the trajectory on their next turn. In addition to conventional warheads, there is also ordnance such as napalm, wildly bouncing bombs, and earth weapons - allowing the player to dump dirt on other tanks or to remove ground from beneath them. A tank which is covered with dirt has to shoot itself free and may get damaged in the process; one which falls from too high a level may be destroyed. A variety of utilities, such as deflector shields, recharge batteries, and tank parachutes, make it much harder to score a kill with a single hit even with the more bizarre and advanced weapons, adding another dimension to the game's tactics.

Projectiles can be manipulated in their flight-path by wind, shields and guidance systems, and sometimes have partially random effects. Walls may have a bouncing effect, wrap-around, or no effect, as may the ceiling. As the player advances in the game, they can afford more and more powerful weapons, as can their opponents.

The game can be played against up to nine other human players and/or computer-controlled ones. A broad range of differently skilled player types is available. If the player-controlled tanks are destroyed before the others, the AI-controlled players continue to battle each other, turning Scorched Earth into a zero-player game.

== History ==
Earliest known version of Scorched Earth (1.0b), with the developer's screen name "Sprig"

The final version of Scorched Earth, 1.5

The earliest version is 1.0b. Public versions include 1.0, 1.1, 1.2, and 1.5, which was released in 1995.

Although 1.0B looks graphically similar to the later versions, in-game, its menus are completely different. It is not as feature-rich and contains some different AI class names, such as "Rifleman" and "Twanger" (which may have been changed, as they are also AI class names in the slightly earlier artillery game Tank Wars).

Starting with 1.0 in 1991, the game became shareware and is graphically what became Scorched Earth.

In version 1.1, more weapons were added, such as Napalm, Smoke Tracers, and Liquid Dirt as well as Joystick support and two new death animations among other things. Also in 1.1, a modem icon was added with the intention of including some form of net play in a following version, however, this feature was never implemented.

Nearly one year later, in 1992, version 1.2 was released which includes a new death animation and Synchronous firing mode. The final version of 1.50 was released in 1995. In 1.5, the registration feature was removed and instead, only a shareware version was released freely while the registered version could be obtained through a mail order only. Purchasing the registered version allowed the player to use the triple-turreted tank as well as removing the shareware reminders. New to this version were lasers, SuperMags, and some scenery.

== Reception ==
Computer Gaming World in 1993 called Scorched Earth "the most configurable artillery game I have come across ... the most playable and addictive", with "quite good" SVGA graphics. The magazine concluded that the game was "a bargain for its modest" $10 price.

In 2008, Mark J. P. Wolf said in his book The Video Game Explosion that this is "probably one of the best loved PC shareware games", as a popular early multiplayer "hot seat" game.

== Legacy ==
In a 2005 interview, Wendell Hicken said that he was talking to several publishers about developing an official sequel. Numerous artillery games that were inspired by Scorched Earth include Death Tank, Pocket Tanks, Atomic Tanks, Charred Dirt, Nasty Armoured Tanks of War, xscorch, Blast Doors, Scorched 3D and Scorched Earth 2000.
