= Hegemony Rome: The Rise of Caesar =

2014 real-time strategy video game

- Developer: Longbow Games
- Publisher: Longbow Games
- Series: Hegemony
- Platform: Microsoft Windows
- Release: WW: 15 May 2014
- Genres: Grand strategy, real-time strategy, real-time tactics
- Mode: Single-player

Hegemony Rome: The Rise of Caesar is a 2014 historical real-time strategy video game developed by Longbow Digital Arts and published by Kasedo Games for Microsoft Windows. Like its 2010 prequel Hegemony Gold: Wars of Ancient Greece, it combines tactical real-time battles and strategic empire management while focusing on logistics and planning of military campaigns. Hegemony Rome is set in the period of the Gallic Wars during the campaigns of Julius Caesar, proconsul of Gaul and Illyria.

== Gameplay ==
Hegemony Rome offers two principal single-player game modes: a campaign mode and a sandbox mode. The campaign is divided into four chapters ("Emigrants and Conquerors", "The Most Courageous of All", "Conquer the Island", and "The Power of Desires"), beginning with the migration of the Helvetii, proceeding through the rebellion of the Belgians and the arrival of Roman forces in the British Isles, and on to the final confrontation with the Arverni of Vercingetorix.

The sandbox mode allows the player the freedom to conquer Southern Britain, the Alps, or the entirety of Gaul in any fashion they choose. These also include tutorials for first-time players. For the first time in the series, wood is introduced as a resource, which is necessary to construct structures like forts and cities, e.g. watch towers, markets, warehouses, or siege workshops. Units possess various upgradable abilities, e.g. for reduction of food consumption or of necessary recruits, enhancement of morale, attack and defense values, or transport through marshes and snowy mountains.

== Expansions ==
Three DLCs were released for the game:

- Bannerman Pack: A free DLC which adds four new animated units, e.g. the Roman Eagle unit and the Gallic hornblower. These units appear in proportion to the unit upgrades to make experienced units more recognisable.
- Advanced Tactics Pack: The first paid DLC comprises six new mercenary units – Kush Archer, Parthian Cataphrats and Horse Archers, Berber Javelineer, Naked Skirmishers, and Gallic Ambushers.
- Mercenaries Pack: The second paid DLC adds another six special mercenary units – Garamante spearmen, Dacian swordsmen, Sarmatian lancers, Thracian peltasts, Iberian swordsmen, and Suioni raiding ships.

== Reception ==
Hegemony Rome was viewed as a less sophisticated successor to Hegemony Gold. The use of the same core game loop on a larger map without new mechanics contributed to the game's repetitiveness. Strategy Gamer rated it 6/10, noting "There is much to be said for Hegemony Rome, and sometimes simple problems do become more interesting if taken to a larger scale. But a truly great strategy game should never be this repetitive, even if the Romans did like their conquests nice and methodically predictable." At the same time, strategy podcast Three Moves Ahead described the Caesar campaign as being close to reality and requiring interesting strategic decisions. Hooked Gamers reviewed the game much more positively, with a rating of 82%: "[Hegemony Rome] throws out pretty much everything you thought you knew about Real-Time Strategy and then proceeds to - successfully - reinvent the genre altogether." GameWatcher rated the game 70% and GameSpot 50%.
