= Hegemony III: Clash of the Ancients =

2015 strategy video game

- Developer: Longbow Games
- Publisher: Longbow Games
- Series: Hegemony
- Platform: Microsoft Windows
- Release: WW: 25 August 2015
- Genres: Grand strategy, Real-time Strategy
- Mode: Single-player

Hegemony III: Clash of the Ancients is the third installment in the Hegemony strategy video game series, which was developed by the Canadian studio Longbow Games and released for Windows on August 25, 2015.

== Overview ==
Hegemony III combines aspects of historical grand strategy games on a freely zoomable map with real-time tactical battles. In contrast to other strategy games, the player can zoom in and out at any time between a 2D strategy map and a 3D tactic map, while the game progresses completely in (pausable) real time. The strategic and tactical levels are linked by the need for resource management. A central aspect of the game is therefore the creation of supply chains to connect resource centers to the infrastructure and to supply armies. On the tactical level, the different types of units are commanded by the player and battles are won through the selection, the stance and the positioning of the units.

== Gameplay ==
=== Overview ===
The game is set around the 5th century BC, a time when Rome was still one among many of the city-states on the Italian peninsula. Accordingly, in addition to Rome, the player can also choose another faction to start the game, for example the Etruscans and the Gauls in the north or the Greeks in the south. By skillfully developing and managing resources and building an army, it is important to expand the sphere of influence of the elected faction. The expansion of the cities with buildings, the research of new technologies and the diplomatic interaction with other factions support the expansion. Initially, the player is supported by a tutorial in the form of a mini-campaign to learn the game mechanics.

=== Sandbox mode ===
The aim in sandbox mode is to collect hegemony points in order to secure overall victory through a combination of cultural, economic and military superiority.

==== Sandbox type ====
1. The player can choose between different sized sandboxes. The base game offers a large Italy sandbox (the Apennine peninsula) and a small Etruria sandbox (somewhat like today's Tuscany). With The Eagle King DLC a medium-sized Sicily sandbox is added and the Italy sandbox can optionally be expanded to include Sicily.
2. With The Eagle King DLC the player can play an invasion scenario in which he freely chooses a faction (e.g. the Gauls, the Cretans, the Macedonians), equips them with troops according to a point system and lands them in Italy. The aim is to establish a base with the settlers who are also present and to assert oneself against the local factions.

==== Factions ====
The factions available in the game reflect those people present in Italy in the 5th century BC. The player can choose from 28 factions from six cultural groups. With the expansion The Eagle King another 5 factions of the Sicilian cultural group are added. The factions differ through different cultural start bonuses, different unit types and partly also different technologies that can be researched as the game progresses. For example, the following factions can be played (non exclusive list): Rome, Veii, the Sabines, the Marsians, the Lucanians or the Venetians. Cultural groups are as follows:

- Etruscan
- Gallic
- Greek
- Illyric
- Latin
- Sabellic
- Sicilian

=== Campaign mode ===
The campaign mode guides the player through a specific historical scenario based on (optional) tasks and events. Currently (as of early 2021) only the Pyrrhus of Epirus campaign is available (The Eagle King DLC), in which the player in the role of King Pyrrhus of Epirus is tasked to protect a coalition of Greek city-states in southern Italy (Magna Graecia) from the expansionist Roman Republic. A number of tasks allow the player to choose whether he wants to relive the story along the lines of historical events or whether he wants to change the story according to his own considerations.

== Map editor and modding support ==
The basic game contains a map editor, with which the player can create his own maps and which can be used for further modifications. Both fantasy and real maps can be created by importing NASA satellite imagery and adjusting them through a number of software tools. Hegemony III offers full support of the Steam workshop and, associated with it, many opportunities to develop and publish one's own modifications of the game.

Some of the more notable mods are

- Kingdom of Macedon Sandbox adds a map and playable factions based on the Kingdom of Macedon and surrounding territory from Hegemony Gold
- Classical World includes a map of Europe, North Africa and the Middle East as well as many additional factions
- Iberia adds a map of Spain and two campaigns regarding the period after the first punic war
- Latium adds a detailed map of the Latium region and a religion mechanic

== Expansions ==
1. The Eagle King DLC is the only expansion so far and was released on February 16, 2017. It contains the Pyrrhus of Epirus campaign, an invasion sandbox and a map expansion for Sicily.
2. Isle of Giants DLC has been announced for 2021 and will contain a map expansion for Sardinia and Corsica.

== Reception ==
According to Steam user reviews Hegemony III has a "very positive" rating, though initially it had a mixed reception. Immediately after release and before the three shortly arriving patches, it was criticized for bugs and poor AI. Game Watcher gave it 6/10, stating "I wanted to like Hegemony III, but it was just too frustrating." On the other hand, WCCFtech rated it 7.8/10 and StrategyFront Gaming said "[it] is a complex and rewarding experience that can stand up to the likes of Total War." In Germany, players attested to its high replayability. In 2016, strategy game podcast Three Moves Ahead discussed how the game had not greatly evolved over time and how it could not offer the same gameplay options – regarding diplomacy or trade – that other strategy titles offered.

However, later reviews were much more positive: "I highly recommend you try Hegemony III: Clash of the Ancients for yourself. It's an ambitious game with a unique focus (supply lines), combining economic management with a detailed wargame, set in a well-realized ancient world. It would be a shame if you, like me, waited too long before taking the plunge."

The expansion The Eagle King was critically acclaimed ("In some ways, The Eagle King is a return to form for the Hegemony series.") and was seen as an important step towards the further development of the series ("The Eagle King is a great expansion for a great game and I'm excited to see where Longbow takes things from here.")
