= Pocket Tanks =

2001 video game

- The "Roman Candle", one of the 15 weapons in the Meteor expansion pack
- Developer: Blitwise Productions
- Publisher: Blitwise Productions
- Designer: Michael P. Welch
- Composer: DNA-groove (Eliran Ben Ishai)
- Platforms: Windows; Mac OS X iOS; Android; Windows Phone
- Release: October 26, 2001
- Genre: Artillery
- Modes: Single-player, multiplayer

Pocket Tanks is a 1 or 2 player artillery game developed by Michael P. Welch from Blitwise Productions. It was originally released for Microsoft Windows and Mac OS X in 2001 and was later released for iOS in 2009 and Android in 2012. It is available as shareware as well as a premium version known as Pocket Tanks Deluxe, which includes the content from all 30 expansion packs.

== Gameplay ==
Pocket Tanks was adapted from Welch's earlier Amiga game Scorched Tanks. Pocket Tanks features modified physics and additional weapons ranging from simple explosive shells to homing missiles. The game also allows each player to move their tank a maximum of four times at a small, prefixed amount each time.

The goal of Pocket Tanks is to use various weapons to attack the other player's tank. Each hit scores a certain number of points, which varies based on the weapon and the proximity of the target. At the end of 10 volleys, the player with the highest score wins.

Pocket Tanks features a fully destructible environment, which allows the player to create and put themselves on pedestals or in bunkers, allowing for more strategic gameplay. Pocket Tanks also supports weapon expansion packs where each player can have up to 400 different weapons in total.

Network play was made available in the version 1.3 release.

=== Expansion packs ===
The game features extra game content in the form of expansion "weapon packs" which give the player more weapon choices during gameplay, available to those who own Pocket Tanks Deluxe. In the PC version, there are 30 Expansion Packs available to download. All packs that include 5 weapons are available for free, and there are 15 weapons that have to be paid for (mobile versions only). As of August 21 2024, there are 385 weapons in total: 30 from the original game and 355 from the various Deluxe Version expansions.

== Development history ==
Michael P. Welch from Blitwise Productions created Amiga games before he started developing PC games such as Super DX-Ball and Neon Wars. Welch developed Pocket Tanks as remake/sequel of the Amiga game Scorched Tanks and extended the gameplay with modified physics, dozens of new weapons (hundreds with a paid expansion), and the ability to move the tank. The game's soundtrack was created by Eliran Ben Ishai as Impulse Tracker Module file. The first version of Pocket Tanks was released in 2001.

On October 26, 2001, the first version of Pocket Tanks was released after a beta. This version continued to be updated, adding features such as network support and more weapons.

Version 1.3 was released in November 2007. It contained bug fixes as well as LAN and IP support.

A Collector's Edition of Pocket Tanks was released on November 16, 2007. It contained the first 14 expansion packs and the Deluxe version of Pocket Tanks.

On April 15, 2009, Pocket Tanks was released on iOS. This version included a new touch interface and 35 weapons to enjoy for free. The iOS version continues to be updated along with other mobile versions that were released later.

On December 7, 2012, Pocket Tanks became available on Android.

On January 9, 2013, Pocket Tanks was released on the Windows Store for devices running Windows 8 and Windows RT.

On March 7, 2013, Pocket Tanks was released on the Amazon Appstore.

Version 2.1 added support for the latest weapon packs and fixed bugs that prevented it from being playable on the Surface Pro.

Version 2.3 brought "online functions from a third-party Backend as a Service supported framework to a Blitwise maintained AWS hosted server infrastructure."

Version 2.7.9 is currently the latest release of the game as of July 2025 and is available for the iOS, Android, and Windows Store versions of the game. Pocket Tanks and Pocket Tanks Deluxe is currently available on Windows, MacOS, iOS, Android, Amazon Appstore, and Windows Store. The original PC versions of the game lack some of the features of the mobile and Windows Store version.

As of 2024, there are 320 weapons to collect on the desktop version, which can be obtained by purchasing all of the expansion packs. This version is available for MacOS and the Windows Desktop. The mobile version is expanded to 385 weapons.

The game is still being updated as of July 2025.
