= Artillery game =

Video game genre

An example artillery game, in which one player fires upon another. The landscape is marked with craters from missed shots.

Artillery games are two- or three-player (usually turn-based) video games involving cannons trying to destroy each other. The core mechanics of the gameplay is almost always to aim at the opponent(s) following a ballistic trajectory (in its simplest form, a parabolic curve). Artillery games are among the earliest computer games developed; the theme of such games is an extension of the original uses of computer themselves, which were once used to calculate the trajectories of rockets and other related military-based calculations. Artillery games have been described as a type of "shooting game", though they are more often classified as a type of strategy video game.

== History ==
=== First Version: Potshot with plotter display ===
Perhaps the first version of an artillery game even with a visual display (plotter) is Potshot 1969 by Arthur Luehrmann (https://www.atariarchive.org/an-interview-with-arthur-luehrmann/)

=== Non graphical versions ===
Early precursors to the modern artillery-type games were text-only games that simulated artillery entirely with input data values. One of the earliest known games in the genre is War 3 for two or three players, written in FOCAL Mod V by Mike Forman (date unknown), then ported to TSS/8 BASIC IV by M. E. Lyon Jr. in 1972, HP Time-Shared BASIC by Brian West in 1975, and then to a cross-platform subset of Microsoft BASIC by Creative Computing in 1979 for the book More BASIC Computer Games, where it appears with multiple names: Artillery-3, Artillery 3, and WAR3. Another early game is Gunner (1973) by Tom Kloos. These early versions of turn-based tank combat games interpreted human-entered data such as the distance between the tanks, the velocity or "power" of the shot fired, and the angle of the tanks' turrets.

=== Graphical versions with Displays ===
The Tektronix 4051 BASIC language desktop computer of the mid-1970s had a demo program called Artillery which used a storage-CRT for graphics. A similar program appeared on the HP 2647 graphics terminal demo tape in the late 1970s.

In 1979, Atari, Inc. released Human Cannonball for the Atari Video Computer System. It replaces the military theme with a player attempting to launch a performer into a container of water by adjusting the angle and force of the cannon. The game is based on an unreleased arcade video game developed at Atari.

Artillery Simulator for the Apple II was among the earliest graphical versions of the turn-based artillery video game.

Graphical adaptions of the artillery game, such as Super Artillery and Artillery Simulator, emerged on the Apple II in 1980. These games built upon the earlier concepts of the artillery games published in Creative Computing but allowed the players to also see a simple graphical representation of the tanks, battlefield, and terrain. The Apple II games also took wind speed into account when calculating the path of the artillery. Some games used lines on the screen to show trajectories previous shots had taken, allowing players to use visual data when considering their next shot. Similar games were made for home computers such as the Commodore PET by 1981. In 1983, Amoeba Software published a game called Tank Trax, which was very soon picked up and re-released by the early Mastertronic Games Company. This was again the classic version of the Artillery Game, however, the player could change the height of the hill in between the players to either a mountain or a foothill (However this sometimes made no difference in the actual gameplay as some foothills were as high as mountains and some mountains were low enough to be considered foothills). The players also had the default names of General Patton and Monty.

Video game console variants of the artillery game soon emerged after the first graphical home computer versions. A two-player game called Smithereens! was released in 1982 for the Magnavox Odyssey^{2} console in which two catapults, each behind a castle fortress wall, launched rocks at each other. Although not turn-based, the game made use of the console's speech synthesis to emit sarcastic insults when one player fired at the other. Artillery Duel was written for the Bally Astrocade by Perkins Engineering and published by Bally in 1982. It was later released in 1983 for the Atari 2600, ColecoVision, Commodore 64 and VIC-20. The game has more elaborate background and terrain graphics as well as a simple graphical readout of wind speed and amount of munitions.

Several variants were written and published as type-in program listings in magazines as well as commercial games for the Sinclair ZX Spectrum home computer through the 1980s, the earliest example possibly being "Tanx" by Pan Books Ltd (UK), published in 1983 in the book Sixty Programs for the Sinclair ZX Spectrum.

Circa 1984, a game called Siege also appeared by publisher Melbourne House, this was released for the VIC-20, Commodore 16 and other home computers. The game was bundled with C16's on a compilation tape along with Zapp, Hangman and many other games. Some variants were misspelled as "Seige" instead of Siege.

== Artillery games for MS-DOS ==
Scorched Earth increased the popularity of the artillery game with its wide variety of weapons, numerous multi-player options, and flexible configuration options.

With the increased presence of IBM PC compatibles came the arrival of artillery games to the platform. 1986 saw the release of Tank Wars by Cody Snider. In 1988, Artillery Combat, or EGAbomb, was released by Rad Delaroderie, written in Turbo BASIC, and was later distributed by RAD Software. Following in 1990, Kenny Morse released a different game also titled Tank Wars, which introduced the concept of buying weapons and multiple AI computer-player tanks to the artillery game. Gravity Wars was a conversion of the Amiga game of the same name that took the artillery game into space, introducing a 2D gravity field around planets, a format that has also inspired multiple re-makes.

In 1991, Gorillas was distributed as part of QBasic with MS-DOS 5.0, the Amiga also had a release at this time called Amiga Tanx distributed via Amiga Format magazine in the UK which included some digitized voices of the tank commanders, some quite amusing when shots got too close for comfort. That year also saw the release of the first version of Scorched Earth by Wendell Hicken. Scorched Earth was a popular shareware game for MS-DOS in which tanks do turn-based battle in two-dimensional terrain, with each player adjusting the angle and power of his or her tank turret before each shot. Scorched Earth, with numerous weapon types and power-ups, is considered the modern archetype of its format. Scorched Earth incorporates many of the features of previous graphical artillery games (including sarcastic comments by each player's tank before firing) while expanding the options available to each player in regard to the choice of weapons available, the ability to use shields, parachutes, and ability to move the player's tank (with the purchase of fuel tanks). The game is highly configurable and utilizes a simple mouse-driven graphical user interface.

== Later derivatives ==
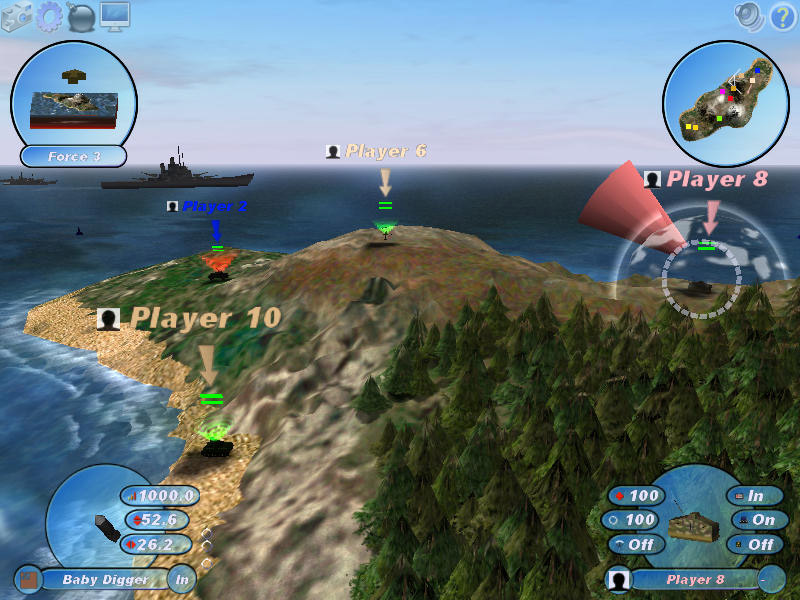
Scorched 3D is Scorched Earth with polygonal graphics.

In 1995, Team17 released the first version of its successful Worms series of turn-based games for the Amiga. In Worms, players control a small platoon of worms (rather than artillery pieces) across a deformable landscape, battling other computer- or player-controlled teams. The games feature bright and humorous cartoon-style animation and a varied arsenal of bizarre weapons. Subsequent games in the series have been released since 1995, including a 3D variant (Worms 3D) in 2003. This was later followed by Worms Forts and Worms 4. The game then went back to its 2D style gameplay in Worms Open Warfare (2006) and Worms: Reloaded (2010).

Scorched Earth inspired a number of variants including: Death Tank (1996), Pocket Tanks (2001), and ShellShock Live (2015). Scorched 3D (2001) is the same concept with 3D terrain.

In 2000, Infogrames released Hogs of War with 3D graphics and a third-person perspective. It is set in the First World War-era where anthropomorphic pigs engage in combat.

In December 2009, Finland-based Rovio Entertainment released Angry Birds, in which the player aims to find the most efficient way to destroy various structures by anticipating the trajectory and destructive effects of a bird fired from slingshot.
