= Lead programmer =

Role in software development

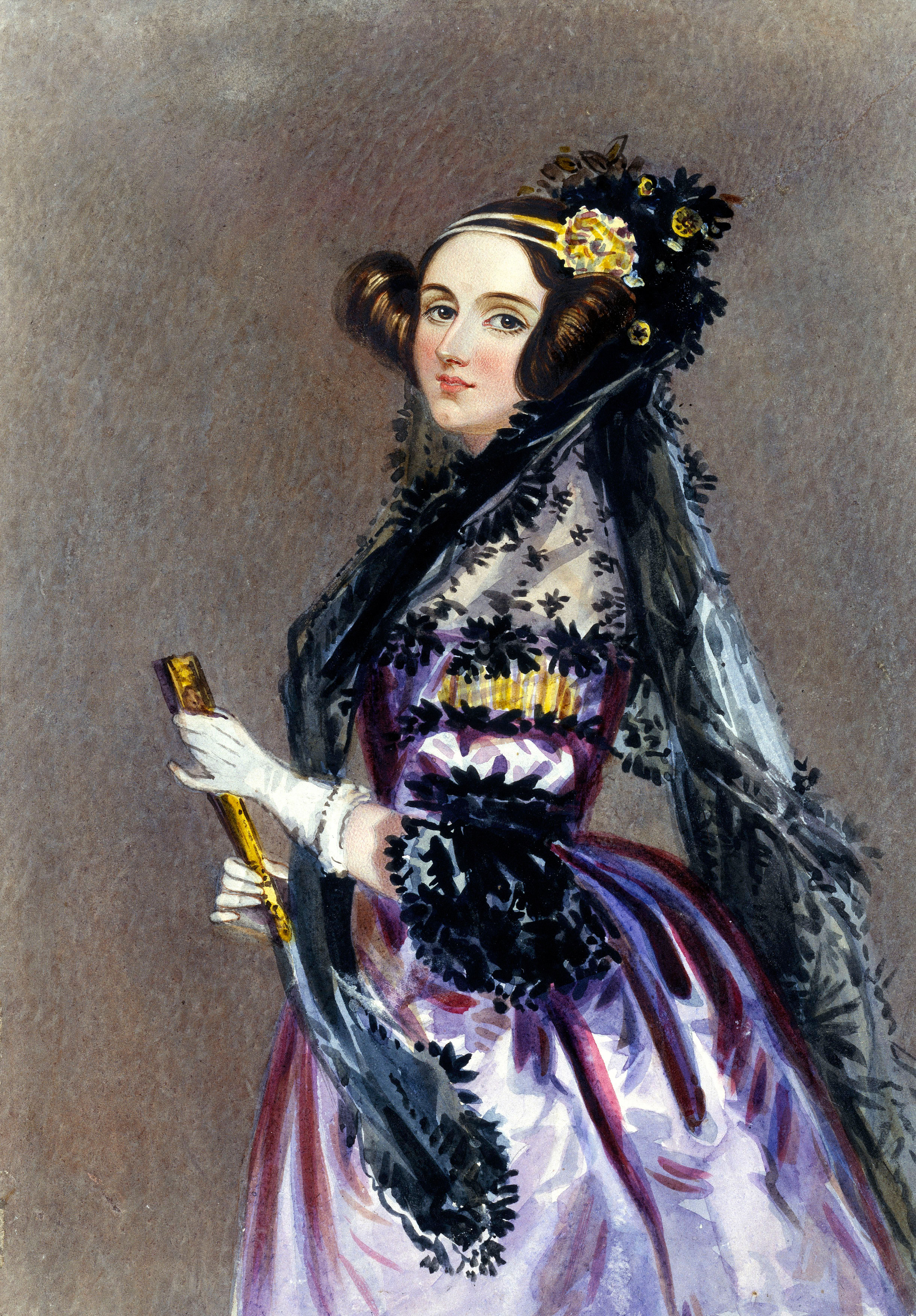
Ada Lovelace, the first lead programmer

In software development, a lead programmer is responsible for providing technical guidance and mentorship to a team of software developers. Alternative titles include development lead, technical lead, lead programmer, or lead application developer. When primarily contributing a low-level enterprise software design with focus on the structure of the app, e.g. design patterns, the role would be a software architect (as distinct to the high-level less technical role of solutions architect.)

== Responsibilities ==
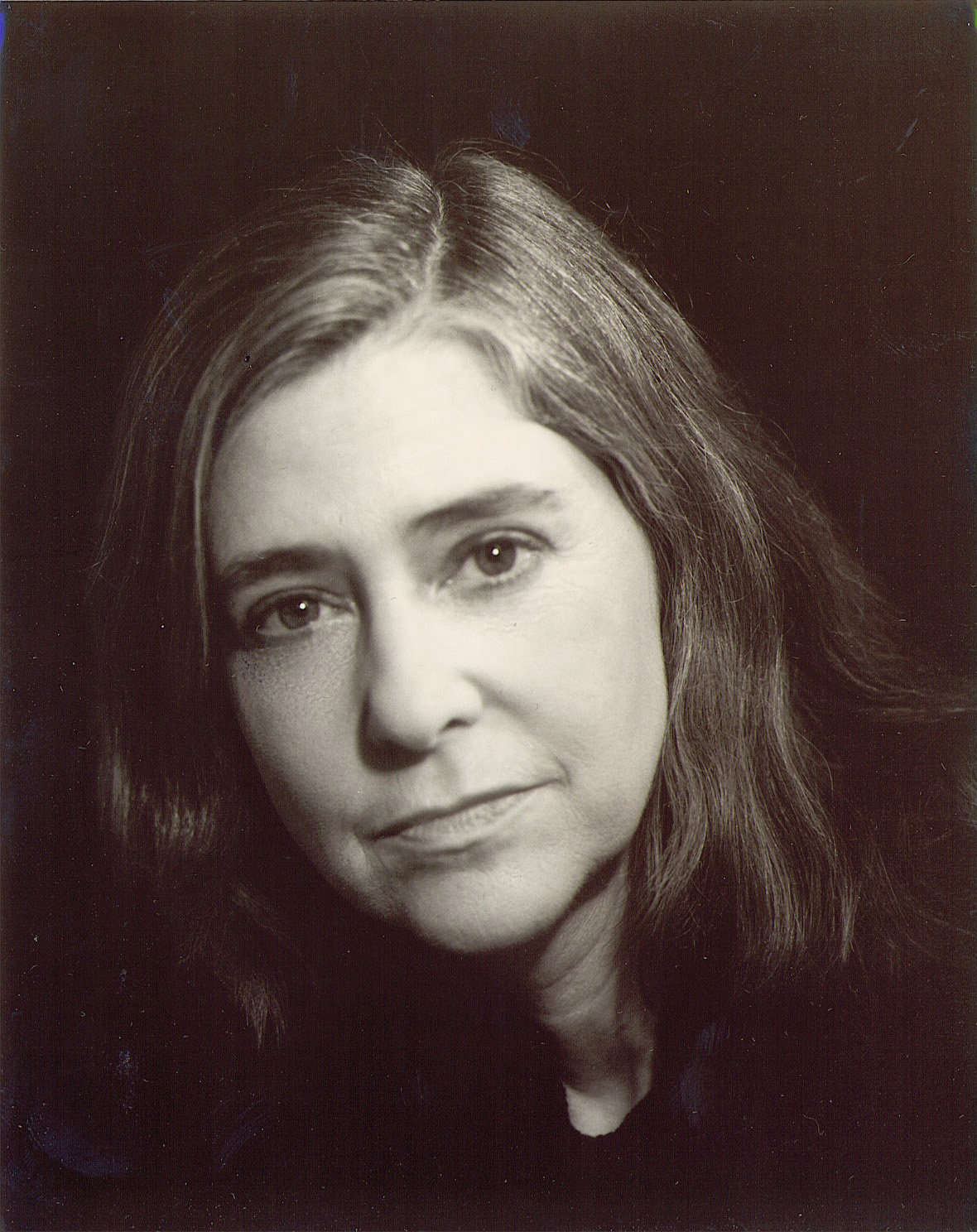
Margaret Hamilton 1995

A lead programmer has responsibilities which may vary from company to company, but in general is responsible for overseeing the work, in a technical sense, of a team of software developers working on a project, ensuring work meets the technical requirements, such as coding conventions, set by the software architect responsible for the underlying architecture. A lead programmer's duties are often "hands on", meaning they typically write software code on a daily basis, assisting their team to meet deadlines and improve the quality of the codebase. They act as a mentor for new or lower-level software developers or programmers, as well as for all the members on the development team, primarily through processes such as pair programming, conducting of code reviews, promoting good development principles, such as test-driven development, and taking the lead in correcting code defects.

Although the responsibilities are primarily technical, lead programmer also generally serve as an interface between the programmers and management, have ownership of their team's development plans and have supervisorial responsibilities in delegating work. They ensure that sections of software projects come in on time and under budget, and assisting technically with hiring and reviewing performance of staff. Lead programmers also serve as technical advisers to management and provide programming perspective on requirements. Typically a lead programmer will oversee a development team of between two and ten programmers.

A lead programmer typically reports to a principal who manages a number of teams. Technical direction may be provided by a software architect. Where teams follow the waterfall, extreme programming, or kanban approaches, the lead programmer is referred to as an engineering manager, or a software development manager, and collaborates directly with a peer, the product owner, who gathers the customer requirements that the end product must meet. In a Scrum (software development) approach, the lead programmer collaborates with a separate position of scrum master, who acts as an intermediary seeking a compromise between business demand (product owner) and team capacity and skillset, e.g. which story tickets from the product backlog will be passed into the next Agile sprint.
