= Super DX-Ball =

2004 video game

- Developer: Michael P. Welch
- Publisher: BlitWise Productions
- Platforms: Windows, OS X
- Release: November 10, 2004
- Genre: Breakout clone
- Mode: Single player

Super DX-Ball is a shareware game by BlitWise Productions, released on November 10, 2004. It is an enhanced remake to the classic brick-buster hit DX-Ball. Among new features since previous games, Super DX-Ball combines graphics and sounds of the original DX-Ball (albeit more refined) and bricks with various shapes and sizes in a similar fashion to Rival Ball Tournament.

== Gameplay ==
As a common concept of Breakout clone, the objective of the game is to clear all the bricks on the screen in order to advance to the next board. The player controls a paddle at the bottom of the screen by using the mouse or keyboard, keeping one or more balls by deflecting them into a field of bricks on the screen without missing the only ball in play. Like previous games, bricks may appear to be unbreakable, take multiple hits to clear, invisible, or explosive. Random bricks release power-ups, and the player can catch these with the paddle, or avoid them depending on the effect whether it is positive, neutral or negative. Negative power-ups (marked red) usually increases the difficulty, while neutral (marked gray) may vary depending on the situation. The power-ups of Super DX-Ball are direct clones from DX-Ball 2, with several minor alterations (e.g. when the player gets a "Fast Ball", the ball now will only speed up slightly instead of accelerating to its highest speed, and the "Extra Life" no longer remove the effects of "Shooting Paddle" and "Grab Paddle"). However, the new power-ups from Rival Ball do not return.

Similar to previous installments, if only one brick remains on the board and taking too long to hit it, the brick will be destroyed by a lightning bolt.

A unique element of the game is when the ball gets stuck between the unbreakable bricks for too long, the ball becomes gold and can clear any bricks in one hit, unlike in previous games where unbreakable bricks are automatically replaced with regular ones when the ball is stuck for a certain amount of time.

Scoring has been reverted to that of the original game; the size of the ball and paddle no longer contribute to the point value of each brick, and bricks that are exploded award less points than the normal value.

== Development ==
Programmed by Michael P. Welch in 2004, Super DX-Ball was considered to be an indirect sequel and as a tribute to the original game, rather than a follow-up to Rival Ball. Unlike its predecessors, the graphics were designed to retain the classic style, recycling the graphics for the bricks and power-ups, a pure black background, but with an updated texture for the paddle (vaguely resembling the "Vaus" from Arkanoid). However, these graphics are greatly refined with a high-colour 32-bit 2D engine, giving a smoother look and solid colours.

The key aspect of Super DX-Ball is the introduction of geometric bricks with various shapes and sizes that create an artistic board design and eye-catching patterns, adding a unique gameplay experience of a Breakout clone. Most of these new board designs are usually based on abstract art and mosaics, though several others form simple pictures and clip-arts. While the freeware version only offers the Super Boards as well as three demo boards from the other three sets, the complete set of levels are only available in the registered version.

Aside from the newly designed geometric boards, the game also offers the classic gameplay experience with regular rectangular bricks, by introducing several classic-style boards that paid tribute to the original game, including the original boards from DX-Ball. There are a total of three sets with 145 classic boards overall, with only two of these sets available in their entirety in the freeware version.

== Board packs ==
The freeware version comes with six different board packs: Classic, Super, Challenge (demo), Surprise (demo), Fun (demo), and Retro (demo), and features a total of 77 boards. The game also features a tribute to MegaBall 3 for the Amiga, including a hidden MegaBall board pack, which contains the 20 boards from the original game, thus bringing the total of playable levels to 97 in the freeware version. This easter egg can be discovered by clicking on the Mega Ball power-up icon on the title screen. Notably, the Classic board pack (which contains all 50 boards from the original DX-Ball) also used to be an easter egg, prior to version 1.1, in which it could be obtained by clicking the grey Amiga Boing Ball icon on the title screen, between the words "DX" and "BALL".

The registered version of the game, referred to as Super DX-Ball Deluxe, features a total of 230 boards, expanding the demo board packs to their entirety of 30 boards each for Challenge, Surprise**, and Fun, and 75 boards for Retro. It also adds support for additional board expansion packs, of which there are two available, as of June 2012:

- Bonus Pack: 15 new levels (Free)
- Treasure Pack: 10 new levels (Free)
  - Included with the main game starting with version 1.1; initially launched as a $7.99 paid expansion pack

Trivially, there is a secret message encoded (via binary code) into the final level of Treasure Pack, which reads "DX-BALL 1996 TO 2006 AND STILL THE BEST ; )".

The board pack system of Super DX-Ball is in an entirely different file format, and thus incompatible for use in both DX-Ball 2 and Rival Ball.
