= Index of Windows games (B) =

This is an index of Microsoft Windows games.

This list has been split into multiple pages. Please use the Table of Contents to browse it.

Title	Released	Developer	Publisher
B-17 Flying Fortress: The Mighty 8th	2000	Wayward Design	MicroProse/Hasbro Interactive
Babbdi	2022	Lemaitre Bros	Lemaitre Bros
Babylon's Fall	2022	PlatinumGames	Square Enix
Babyz	1999	Andrew Stern	Mindscape
Back 4 Blood	2021	Turtle Rock Studios	Warner Bros. Games
Back Track	1998	Telegames	Telegames
Backfirewall	2023	Naraven	All in! Games
Backyard Soccer MLS Edition	2001	Humongous Entertainment	Atari Europe S.A.S.U.
The Baconing	2011	Hothead Games	Electronic Arts
Bad Boys: Miami Takedown	2004	Blitz Games	Empire Interactive
Bad Day L.A.	2006	Enlight	Enlight
Bad Mojo	1996	Pulse Entertainment	Acclaim Entertainment, Inc.
Bad North	2018	Plausible Concept	Raw Fury
Baldr Force	2002	GIGA Team Baldrhead	GIGA Co.
Baldi's Basics in education and learning!	2018	Basically, Games!	Basically, Games!
Baldis Basics Birthday bash!	2019	Basically, Games!	Basically, Games!
Baldi's Basics Classics remastered!	2022	Basically, Games!	Basically, Games!
Baldi's Basics Plus	2020	Basically, Games!	Basically, Games!
Baldur's Gate	1998	BioWare	Black Isle Studios/Interplay Entertainment
Baldur's Gate 3	2023	Larian Studios	Larian Studios
Baldur's Gate II: Shadows of Amn	2000	BioWare	Black Isle Studios, Interplay Entertainment
Baldur's Gate II: Throne of Bhaal	2001	BioWare	Interplay Entertainment
Baldur's Gate: Tales of the Sword Coast	1999	BioWare	Black Isle Studios, Interplay Entertainment
The Ball (video game)	2010	Teotl Studios	Tripwire Interactive
Ballance	2004	Cyparade	Atari
Ballistics	2001	Grin	Xicat Interactive
Band of Bugs	2007	NinjaBee	Microsoft Game Studios
Bandits: Phoenix Rising	2002	Grin	Pan Vision
Bang! Gunship Elite	2000	RayLand	Red Storm Entertainment
Bang! Howdy	2006	Three Rings Design	Three Rings Design
Banished (video game)	2014	Shining Rock Software	Shining Rock Software
The Banished Vault	2023	Lunar Division	Bithell Games
The Banner Saga	2014	Stoic Studio	Versus Evil
The Banner Saga 2	2016	Stoic Studio	Versus Evil
The Banner Saga 3	2018	Stoic Studio	Versus Evil
Banzai Bug	1997	Gravity, Inc.	Grolier Interactive
Barbie Fashion Show: An Eye for Style	2008	Treyarch	Activision
Barbie Riding Club	1998	Human Code	Mattel Media
Barbie Super Sports	1999	Runecraft	Mattel Media
The Bard's Tale	2004	InXile Entertainment	Vivendi Universal Games
The Bard's Tale IV: Barrows Deep	2018	inXile Entertainment	inXile Entertainment
Barnyard	2006	Blue Tongue Entertainment	THQ
Baron Wittard: Nemesis of Ragnarok	2011	Wax Lyrical Games	Iceberg Interactive
Barotrauma (video game)	2023	Undertow Games	Daedalic Entertainment
Barrow Hill: Curse of the Ancient Circle	2006	Shadow Tor Studios	Shadow Tor Studios
The Basement Collection	2012	Edmund McMillen and Tyler Glaiel	Headup Games
Bastion	2011	Supergiant Games	Warner Bros. Interactive Entertainment
Batman: Arkham Asylum	2009	Rocksteady Studios	Eidos Interactive, Warner Bros. Interactive Entertainment
Batman: Arkham City	2011	Rocksteady Studios	Warner Bros. Interactive Entertainment
Batman: Arkham Knight	2015	Rocksteady Studios	Warner Bros. Interactive Entertainment
Batman: Arkham Origins	2013	WB Games Montréal, Iron Galaxy Studios	Warner Bros. Interactive Entertainment
Batman: Vengeance	2001	Ubisoft Montreal	Ubisoft
Batora: Lost Haven	2022	Stormind Games	Team17
Battle Academy	2010	Slitherine Software	Slitherine Software
Battle Academy 2: Eastern Front	2014	Slitherine Software	Slitherine Software
Battle Arena Toshinden 2	1996	Tamsoft, Kinesoft	Takara, Toshiaki Ota
Battle Beast	1995	7th Level	BMG Interactive
Battle Brothers	2017	Overhype Studios	Overhype Studios
Battle Chasers: Nightwar	2017	Airship Syndicate	THQ Nordic
Battle Engine Aquila	2003	Lost Toys	Atari
Battle Isle: The Andosia War	2000	Cauldron	Blue Byte
Battle of Britain II: Wings of Victory	2005	A2A Simulations	TRI Synergy, GMX Media
Battle Realms	2001	Liquid Entertainment	Ubisoft
Battle Realms: Winter of the Wolf	2002	Liquid Entertainment/Crave	Ubisoft
Battle Worlds: Kronos	2013	King Art Games	Crimson Cow/Nordic Games
Battlecruiser 3000AD v2.0	1998	3000 AD	DreamCatcher Interactive
Battlefield 1	2016	DICE	Electronic Arts
Battlefield 2	2005	Digital Illusions CE	EA Games
Battlefield 3	2011	Digital Illusions CE	EA Games
Battlefield 4	2013	EA DICE	Electronic Arts
Battlefield 1942	2002	Digital Illusions CE	EA Games
Battlefield 1942: Secret Weapons of WWII	2003	Digital Illusions CE	EA Games
Battlefield 1942: The Road to Rome	2003	Digital Illusions CE	EA Games
Battlefield 2042	2021	DICE	Electronic Arts
Battlefield 2142	2006	Digital Illusions CE	Electronic Arts
Battlefield Hardline	2015	Visceral Games	Electronic Arts
Battlefield Heroes	2009	EA Digital Illusions CE	Electronic Arts
Battlefield Online	2009	Neowiz Games, Electronic Arts, DICE	Neowiz Games
Battlefield V	2018	EA DICE	Electronic Arts
Battlefield Vietnam	2004	Digital Illusions	Electronic Arts
Battlefield: Bad Company 2	2010	EA Digital Illusions CE	Electronic Arts
BattleForge	2009	EA Phenomic	Electronic Arts
Battlefront	2007	Strategic Studies Group	Matrix Games
Battlefleet Gothic: Armada	2016	Tindalos Interactive	Focus Home Interactive
Battlefleet Gothic: Armada 2	2019	Tindalos Interactive	Focus Home Interactive
Battleground 2: Gettysburg	1995	TalonSoft	TalonSoft
Battleground 3: Waterloo	1996	TalonSoft	TalonSoft
Battleground 4: Shiloh	1996	TalonSoft	TalonSoft
Battleground 5: Antietam	1996	TalonSoft	TalonSoft
Battleground 6: Napoleon in Russia	1997	TalonSoft	TalonSoft
Battleground 7: Bull Run	1997	TalonSoft	TalonSoft
Battleground 8: Prelude to Waterloo	1997	TalonSoft	TalonSoft
Battleground 9: Chickamauga	1998	TalonSoft	TalonSoft
Battleground: Ardennes	1995	TalonSoft	TalonSoft
Battlestar Galactica Deadlock	2017	Black Lab Games	Slitherine Software
Battlestations: Midway	2007	Eidos Interactive	Eidos Interactive
Battlestations: Pacific	2009	Eidos Hungary	Eidos Interactive
BattleTech	2018	Harebrained Schemes	Paradox Interactive
Battlezone	1998	Activision	Activision
Battlezone II: Combat Commander	1999	Pandemic Studios	Activision
Beach Head 2000	2000	Digital Fusion	WizardWorks, Infogrames
Beach Life	2002	Deep Red Games	Eidos Interactive
Beam Breakers	2002	Similis	JoWooD Productions Software
Beast Wars: Transformers	1997	Hasbro Interactive	Hasbro Interactive
The Beast Within: A Gabriel Knight Mystery	1995	Sierra On-Line	Sierra On-Line
Beasts and Bumpkins	1997	Worldweaver Productions	Electronic Arts
Beautiful Desolation	2020	The Brotherhood	The Brotherhood
Beavis and Butt-Head in Virtual Stupidity	1995	Viacom New Media	Viacom New Media
Beetle Crazy Cup	2000	Xpiral	Infogrames
Beijing 2008	2008	Eurocom	Sega
Bejeweled	2001	PopCap Games	PopCap Games
Bejeweled Twist	2008	PopCap Games	PopCap Games
Bella Sara	2008	Hidden City Games	Codemasters
Bendy and the Ink Machine	2017	TheMeatly Games	TheMeatly Games
Beowulf: The Game	2007	Ubisoft	Ubisoft
Bermuda Syndrome	1995	Century Interactive	BMG Interactive
Bet On Soldier: Blood Sport	2005	Kylotonn	Digital Jesters
Betrayal in Antara	1997	Sierra Entertainment	Sierra Entertainment
Betrayer	2014	Blackpowder Games	Blackpowder Games
Beyond Divinity	2004	Larian Studios	CDV
Beyond Flesh and Blood	2016	Pixelbomb Games	Sold Out
Beyond Good & Evil	2003	Ubisoft Montpellier, Ubisoft Milan	Ubisoft
Beyond: Two Souls	2019	Quantic Dream	Quantic Dream
Bible Black	2000	ActiveSoft	ActiveSoft, Kitty Media
Big Bang Beat	2007	NRF	AliceSoft
Big Biz Tycoon	2002	Animedia	Activision Value
Big Biz Tycoon! 2	2003	4HEAD Studios	Activision Value
The Big Catch	2026	Filet Group	Xseed Games
Big Kahuna Reef	2004	Reflexive Entertainment	Reflexive Entertainment
Big Money!	2002	PopCap Games	PopCap Games
Big Mutha Truckers	2002	Eutechnyx	Empire Interactive
Big Mutha Truckers 2: Truck Me Harder	2005	Empire Interactive	THQ
Big Rigs: Over the Road Racing	2003	Stellar Stone	GameMill Publishing
Bigfoot: Collision Course	2008	Destination Games	Zoo Games
Bikini Karate Babes	2002	Creative Edge Studios	Creative Edge Studios
Billy Hatcher and the Giant Egg	2003	Sonic Team	Sega
Billy the Wizard: Rocket Broomstick Racing	2006	Data Design Interactive	Conspiracy Entertainment, Data Design Interactive
Binary Domain	2012	Ryu Ga Gotoku Studio	Sega
The Binding of Issac	2011	Edmund McMillen and Florian Himsl	Headup Games
The Binding of Isaac: Rebirth	2014	Nicalis	Nicalis
Biomutant	2021	Experiment 101	THQ Nordic
Bionic Commando	2009	Grin	Capcom
Bionic Commando Rearmed	2008	Grin	Capcom
Bionicle	2003	Argonaut Games	Lego Media, Electronic Arts
Bionicle Heroes	2006	TT Games	Eidos Interactive
BioShock	2007	2K Boston/2K Australia	2K Games
BioShock 2	2010	2K Marin	2K Games
BioShock 2: Minerva's Den	2010	2K Marin	2K Games
BioShock Infinite	2013	Irrational Games	2K Games
BioShock Infinite: Burial at Sea	2013	Irrational Games	2K Games
Birth of America	2006	SEP BOA	AGEOD
Birthright: The Gorgon's Alliance	1996	Synergistic Software	Sierra On-Line
Bittersweet Fools	2001	Minori	Minori
The Bizarre Adventures of Woodruff and the Schnibble	1994	Coktel Vision	Sierra Entertainment
Black & White	2001	Lionhead Studios	EA Games
Black & White 2	2005	Lionhead Studios	EA Games
Black & White 2: Battle of the Gods	2006	Lionhead Studios	EA Games
Black & White: Creature Isle	2002	Lionhead Studios	Electronic Arts
Black Dahlia	1998	Take Two Interactive	Interplay Entertainment
Black the Fall	2017	Sand Sailor Studio	Square Enix
Black Mesa	2012	Black Mesa team	
Black Myth: Wukong	2024	Game Science	Game Science
Black Skylands	2021	Hungry Couch Games	tinyBuild
Blackguards	2014	Daedalic Entertainment	Daedalic Entertainment
Blackguards 2	2015	Daedalic Entertainment	Daedalic Entertainment
Blacklight: Retribution	2012	Zombie Studios	EA Games
BlackSite: Area 51	2007	Midway Studios Austin	Midway
Blacktail (video game)	2022	The Parasight	Focus Entertainment
Blade Runner	1997	Westwood Studios	Virgin Interactive
Blades of Time	2012	Gaijin Entertainment	Gaijin Entertainment
Blair Witch (video game)	2019	Bloober Team	Lionsgate Games
Blasphemous	2019	The Game Kitchen	Team17
Blaze and Blade: Eternal Quest	1998	T&E Soft	THQ
Blazing Angels 2: Secret Missions of WWII	2007	Ubisoft Bucharest	Ubisoft
Blazing Angels: Squadrons of WWII	2006	Ubisoft Bucharest	Ubisoft
Bliss	2005	Games for Loving	Games for Loving
Bliss Island	2006	PomPom Games	Codemasters
Blitzkrieg	2003	Nival Interactive	CDV
Blitzkrieg 2	2005	Nival Interactive	CDV
Block Breaker Deluxe	2004	Gameloft	Gameloft
Blockland	2007	Eric "Badspot" Hartman, Ben Garney	Blockland LLC
Blood & Magic	1996	Tachyon Studios	Interplay Entertainment
Blood Bowl	2009	Cyanide	Focus Home Interactive
Blood II: The Chosen	1998	Monolith Productions	GT Interactive
Blood Knights	2013	Deck13 Interactive	Kalypso Media
Blood Omen 2	2002	Crystal Dynamics	Eidos Interactive
Blood Omen: Legacy of Kain	1997	Silicon Knights	Crystal Dynamics
BloodRayne	2002	Terminal Reality	Majesco
BloodRayne 2	2004	Terminal Reality	Majesco, THQ
BlowOut	2003	Terminal Reality	Majesco
Blue Heat: The Case of the Cover Girl Murders	1997	Quarium Inc., MPCA Interactive	MPCA Interactive, Orion Interactive
Blue's Clues Kindergarten	2005	Atari	Atari
Blueberry Garden	2009	Erik Svedäng	Valve
Blur	2009	Bizarre Creations	Activision
Boiling Point: Road to Hell	2005	Deep Shadows	Atari
Bolt	2008	Avalanche Software	Disney Interactive Studios
Bone: Out from Boneville	2005	Telltale Games	Telltale Games
Bone: The Great Cow Race	2006	Telltale Games	Telltale Games
Bonnie's Bookstore	2005	New Crayon Games	PopCap Games
Boogie Bunnies	2008	Artech Studios	Sierra Online
The Book of Unwritten Tales	2009	King Art	HMH Interactive
Bookworm	2003	PopCap Games	PopCap Games
Bookworm Adventures	2006	PopCap Games	PopCap Games
Boomerang Fu	2020	Cranky Watermelon	Cranky Watermelon
Borderlands	2009	Gearbox Software	2K Games
Borderlands 2	2012	Gearbox Software	2K Games
Borderlands 2: Tiny Tina's Assault on Dragon Keep	2012	Gearbox Software	2K Games
Borderlands 3	2019	Gearbox Software	2K Games
Borderlands: The Pre-Sequel	2014	2K Australia, Gearbox Software	2K Games
Bos Wars	2007	Bos Wars Team	
Boss Rally	1999	Boss Game Studios	SouthPeak Interactive
Botanicula	2012	Amanita Design	Amanita Design
Botany Manor	2024	Balloon Studios	Whitethorn Games
Boulder Dash-XL	2011	Catnip Games	Kalypso Media, First Star Software
Bound by Flame	2014	Spiders	Focus Home Interactive
Braid	2008	Number None	Number None
Brain Dead 13	1996	ReadySoft	ReadySoft
Brain Exercise with Dr. Kawashima	2009	Namco Bandai	Namco Bandai
Bramble: The Mountain King	2023	Dimfrost Studio	Merge Games
Bratz	2002	DC Studios	Ubisoft
Bratz: Rock Angelz	2005	Blitz Games, AWE Games	THQ
Bratz: Super Babyz	2008	Creat Studios	THQ
Brawlhalla	2017	Blue Mammoth Games	Ubisoft
Breached	2016	Drama Drifters	Nkidu Games
BreakQuest	2004	Nurium Games	Stardock, Nurium Games, Red Marble Games
Breath of Fire IV	2003	Capcom	Sourcenext, Capcom
Breathedge	2021	Redruins Softworks	HypeTrain Digital
Breed	2004	Brat Designs	Cdv Software Entertainment
Brian Lara Cricket	1998	Codemasters	Codemasters
Brian Lara International Cricket 2005	2005	Swordfish Studios	Codemasters
Brian Lara International Cricket 2007	2007	Codemasters	Codemasters
Brick Breaker	2016	Sanuk Games	Bigben Interactive S.A.
Brigade E5: New Jagged Union	2005	Apeiron	1C Company
Brink	2010	Splash Damage	Bethesda Softworks
Britney's Dance Beat	2002	Hyperspace Cowgirls	THQ
Broken Roads	2024	Drop Bear Bytes	Versus Evil
Broken Sword II: The Smoking Mirror	1997	Revolution Software	Virgin Interactive Entertainment
Broken Sword: Shadow of the Templars – The Director's Cut	2010	Revolution Software	Kalypso Media
Broken Sword: The Angel of Death	2006	Revolution Software	THQ
Broken Sword: The Shadow of the Templars	1996	Revolution Software	Virgin Interactive Entertainment
Broken Sword: The Sleeping Dragon	2003	Revolution Software	THQ
Brothers in Arms: Earned in Blood	2005	Gearbox Software	Ubisoft
Brothers in Arms: Hell's Highway	2008	Gearbox Software	Ubisoft
Brothers in Arms: Road to Hill 30	2005	Gearbox Software	Ubisoft
Brütal Legend	2013	Double Fine Productions	Double Fine Productions
Brunswick Circuit Pro Bowling	1998	Adrenalin Entertainment, Point of View	THQ
Bubsy 3D: Bubsy Visits the James Turrell Retrospective	2013	Arcane Kids	Arcane Kids, Phelios
Bubsy: Paws on Fire!	2019	Choice Provisions	Accolade
Bucket Detective	2017	The Whale Husband	The Whale Husband
Buddy Simulator 1984	2021	Not a Sailor Studios	Not a Sailor Studios, Feardemic
Bug!	1996	Realtime Associates	Sega
Bug Too!	1997	Realtime Associates	Sega
Bug's Life, A	1998	Disney Interactive	Disney Interactive
Bugs Bunny & Taz: Time Busters	2000	Artificial Mind and Movement	Infogrames
Bugs Bunny: Lost in Time	1999	Behaviour Interactive	Infogrames
Build-a-lot	2007	HipSoft	
Buku Sudoku	2006	Absolutist	Merscom
Bulletstorm	2011	People Can Fly, Epic Games	Electronic Arts
Bully	2006	Rockstar Vancouver	Rockstar Games
The Bureau: XCOM Declassified	2013	2K Marin	2K
Burnout Paradise	2008	Criterion Games	Electronic Arts
Bus Driver	2007	SCS Software	SCS Software
Byzantine	1997	Discovery Channel Multimedia, Stormfront Studios	Discovery Communications
