= List of turn-based strategy video games =

See Lists of video games for related lists.

This is a comprehensive index of turn-based strategy video games, sorted chronologically. Information regarding date of release, developer, platform, setting and notability is provided when available. The table can be sorted by clicking on the small boxes next to the column headings.

== Legend ==
Video game platforms
3DO	3DO	AMI	Amiga	AMI32	Amiga CD32
APPII	Apple II	ATR	Atari 8-bit computers	ATRST	Atari ST, Atari Falcon
ATR26	Atari 2600, Atari 2800	BBS	BBS door	C64	Commodore 64
CLV	ColecoVision, Coleco Adam	CPC	Amstrad CPC	DC	Dreamcast
DOS	PC DOS / MS-DOS, Windows 3.X	DROID	Android	DS	Nintendo DS, DSiWare, iQue DS
FM7	FM-7	GB	Game Boy	GBA	Game Boy Advance, iQue GBA
GBC	Game Boy Color	GCN	GameCube	GEN	Genesis / Mega Drive
GG	Game Gear	INT	Intellivision	iOS	iOS, iPhone, iPod, iPadOS, iPad, visionOS, Apple Vision Pro
JAG	Atari Jaguar	LIN	Linux, SteamOS	MAC	Classic Mac OS, 2001 and before
MAIN	Mainframe computer	MOBI	Mobile phone	MSX	MSX
N64	Nintendo 64, iQue Player	NES	Nintendo Entertainment System / Famicom	NGE	N-Gage
NX	(replace with NS)	OSX	macOS	PC88	PC-8800 series
PC98	PC-9800 series	PCD	TurboGrafx-CD / PC Engine CD-ROM²	PCE	TurboGrafx-16 / PC Engine
PPC	Pocket PC	PS1	PlayStation 1	PS2	PlayStation 2
PS3	PlayStation 3	PS4	PlayStation 4	PS5	PlayStation 5
PSP	PlayStation Portable	PSV	PlayStation Vita	S32X	32X
SAT	Sega Saturn	SCD	Sega CD / Mega-CD	SNES	Super NES / Super Famicom / Super Comboy
Stadia	Google Stadia	VIC20	VIC-20	Wii	Wii, WiiWare, Wii Virtual Console
WIN	Windows, all versions Windows 95 and up	WIN3X	Term not found	WIN9X	Term not found
WS	WonderSwan	X1	Sharp X1	X360	(replace with XB360)
X68K	X68000	XBOX	(replace with XB)	XOne	(replace with XBO)
XSX/S	(replace with XBX/S)	ZX	ZX Spectrum		

Types of releases
Compilation	A compilation, anthology or collection of several titles, usually (but not always) belonging to the same series
Early access	A game launched in early access is unfinished and thus might contain bugs and glitches or have some of the content missing
Episodic	An episodic video game that is released in batches over a period of time
Expansion	A large-scale DLC to an already existing game that adds new story, areas and additions and/or changes to the game's mechanics
Full release	A full release of a game that launched in early access first
Limited	A special release (often called "Limited" or "Collector's Edition") with bonus collector's material. Often provided to people who pre-order a game
Port	The game first appeared on a different platform and a port was made. The game is like the original, with few or no differences
Remake	The game is an enhanced remake of an original, made using a new engine and/or assets and thus containing completely new sound, graphics and possibly changes to the story and/or gameplay
Remaster	The game is a remaster of an original, released on the same or different platform, with (usually minor) changes to graphics, sound and/or gameplay
Rerelease	The game was re-released on the same platform with no or only minor changes

Video game genres
4X	4X game	Artillery	Artillery game	Auto battler	Auto battler
DCCG	Digital collectible card game	Grand strategy	Grand strategy game	MOBA	Multiplayer online battle arena
RTS	Real-time strategy	RTT	Real-time tactics	Tactical RPG	Tactical role-playing game
TBS	Turn-based strategy	TBT	Turn-based tactics	Tower defense	Tower defense
Wargame	Computer wargame				

== List ==
Year	Game	Developer	Setting	Platform	Notes
1976	Microchess	Peter R. Jennings	Abstract	APPII, ATR	Chess
1977	Empire	Walter Bright	Abstract	BBS, MAIN	Turn based strategy. Original version.
1978	Sargon	Kathe and Dan Spracklen	Abstract	APPII, DOS, MAC	Chess
1981	Feudal	Steve Estvanik	Fantasy	MAIN	Strategy, timed turns.
1982	Utopia	Don Daglow	Modern	INT	Timed turns.
1983	Archon: The Light and the Dark	Free Fall	Fantasy	AMI, APPII, ATR, C64, CPC, DOS, NES, ZX	Fast-action battles.
1983	Artillery Duel	Xonox	Abstract	ATR26, C64, CLV, VIC20	Artillery game.
1983	Berserker Raids	Berserker Works	Sci-fi	APPII, ATR, DOS, C64	Turn-based strategy.
1983	Reach for the Stars	SSG	Sci-fi	AMI, APPII, MAC, C64, DOS	4X game.
1983	M.U.L.E.	Ozark Softscape	Sci-fi	ATR, APPII, C64, DOS, NES, MSX	Resource strategy.
1983	Nobunaga no Yabou	Koei	Historical	GB, GEN, MSX, NES, SNES	Grand strategy. First title in the series.
1984	Archon II: Adept	Jon Freeman, Paul Reiche III, Anne Westfall	Fantasy	AMI, APPII, ATR, C64, CPC, NES, ZX	Fast-action battles. Sequel to Archon: The Light and the Dark.
1984	Colossus Chess	Martin Bryant	Abstract	AMI, APPII, ATR, C64, DOS, MSX, ATRST, ZX	Chess
1984	Imperium Galactum	SSI	Sci-fi	APPII, ATR, C64	4X game.
1984	Incunabula	Steve Estvanik	Historical	DOS	4X game. Based on Avalon Hill's board game, Civilization.
1984	Nebula	Julian Gollop	Sci-fi	ZX	Turn-based strategy.
1985	Theatre Europe	Sean Pearce, David Bolton	Historical	ZX, CPC, C64, MSX, ATR	Turn-based with optional action elements.
1985	Romance of the Three Kingdoms	Koei	Historical	AMI, DOS, FM7, GB, GBC, MOBI, MSX, NES, PC88, SNES, WS, X1	Grand strategy. First title in the series.
1985	Strategic Conquest	Peter Merrill, Delta Tao	Historical	APPII, MAC	4X game.
1986	Nobunaga's Ambition	Koei	Historical	PC88, GEN, NES, PS1, PCD, SNES	Grand strategy.
1986	Chessmaster	David Kittinger	Abstract	DOS, GB, MAC, NES, PS1, PS2, PSP, VIC20, WIN, WIN3X, WIN9X, XBOX	Chess
1986	Lords of Conquest	Eon	Fantasy	APPII, ATR, C64, DOS, ATRST	Based on the board game, Borderlands.
1987	Anacreon: Reconstruction 4021	Thinking Machines	Sci-fi	DOS	4X game.
1987	Empire: Wargame of the Century	Walter Bright, Mark Baldwin	Sci-fi	AMI, DOS, ATRST, APPII, C64	Turn based strategy. Remake of Empire.
1987	Genghis Khan	Koei	Historical	AMI, DOS, MSX, NES, PC98, X68K	Grand strategy.
1987	Strategic Conquest II	Peter Merrill	Historical	APPII, MAC	4X game. Sequel to Strategic Conquest.
1987	Xconq	Stan Shebs, others	n/a		4X game.
1988	Battle Chess	Jayesh J. Patel, Troy P. Worrell, Michael Quarles	Fantasy	AMI, APPII, C64, DOS, MAC, NES, PC98, ATRST, WIN3X, WIN9X, X68K	Chess
1988	Desert Commander	Kemco	Historical	NES	Turn-based strategy.
1988	Nobunaga's Ambition II	Koei	Historical	PC88, GBC, NES	Grand strategy. Sequel to Nobunaga's Ambition.
1988	Famicom Wars	Intelligent Systems, Nintendo R&D1	Modern	NES	Turn-based strategy. 1st game in the Wars series. Only released in JP.
1989	Bandit Kings of Ancient China	Koei	Historical, Fantasy	AMI, DOS, MAC, MSX, NES	Tactical battles. Several sequels released only in China.
1989	L'Empereur	Koei	Historical	DOS, MSX, NES	Turn-based strategy.
1989	Conflict: Europe	Personal Software Services	Historical	AMI, DOS, ATRST	Turn-based strategy.
1989	Military Madness	Hudson Soft	Sci-fi	PCE	Turn-based strategy.
1989	Nuclear War	New World	Sci-fi	AMI, DOS	Turn-based strategy.
1989	Storm Across Europe	SSI	Historical	AMI, C64, DOS, ATRST	Grand strategy.
1989	Romance of the Three Kingdoms II	Koei	Historical	AMI, DOS, GEN, MOBI, MSX, NES, SNES, WS	Grand strategy. Sequel to Romance of the Three Kingdoms.
1990	Daikaiju Deburasu	—N/a	Kaiju	NES	
1990	Warlords	Steve Fawkner	Fantasy	AMI, DOS, MAC	4X game. First title in the series.
1990	Centurion: Defender of Rome	Bits of Magic	Historical	AMI, DOS, GEN	Real-time tactical battles.
1990	King's Bounty	New World Computing	Fantasy	AMI, DOS, GEN, C64	
1990	Shingen the Ruler	Hot-B	Historical	NES	Turn-based strategy set in Sengoku period of Japan.
1990	Spaceward Ho!	Delta Tao	Sci-fi	AMI, DOS, MAC, WIN	4X game.
1990	Zan Gear	Wolf Team	Historical	GG	Grand strategy.
1990	Nobunaga's Ambition: Lord of Darkness (a.k.a. Nobunaga no Yabou: Bushou Fuuun Roku)	Koei	Historical	GEN, NES, PS1, PCD, SNES	Grand strategy.
1991	Armada 2525	Interstel Corporation	Sci-fi	DOS	4X game.
1991	Sid Meier's Civilization	MicroProse	Historical	AMI, DOS, MAC, SNES, ATRST, WIN	4X game. First title in the series.
1991	Fritz	Frans Morsch, Mathias Feist	Abstract	DOS, DS, iOS, PPC, PS3, Wii, WIN, WIN3X, WIN9X	Chess
1991	Battle Isle	Blue Byte	Sci-fi	AMI, DOS	First game in the Battle Isle series.
1991	Scorched Earth	Wendell Hicken	Abstract	DOS	Artillery game.
1991	Second Conflict	jSOFT	Sci-fi	WIN3X	Turn-based battles.
1991	Star-King	Spacewar Simulations Company	Sci-fi		Planetary conquest.
1991	Game Boy Wars	Intelligent Systems, Nintendo R&D1	Modern	GB	Turn-based strategy. 2nd game in the Wars series. Only released in JP.
1992	Gemfire	Koei	Fantasy	DOS, GEN, MSX, NES, SNES	Turn-based tactical battles.
1992	Godzilla 2: War of the Monsters	Toho	Sci-fi	NES	Implied sequel to 1988's Godzilla: Monster of Monsters!, but shares very few similarities with it.
1992	Romance of the Three Kingdoms III: Dragon of Destiny	Koei	Historical	DOS, GEN, PCE, SCD, SNES	Grand strategy. Sequel to Romance of the Three Kingdoms II.
1992	Nobunaga no Yabou: Haouden	Koei	Historical	PC98, 3DO, GEN, PS1, SCD, SNES	Grand strategy.
1992	VGA Planets	Tim Wisseman	Sci-fi	DOS, WIN	4X game.
1992	Genghis Khan II: Clan of the Gray Wolf	Koei	Historical	DOS, GEN, PC88, PC98, SNES, X68K	Grand strategy. Sequel to Genghis Khan.
1993	Battleship	Mindscape	Abstract	GG, NES	Based on the board game of the same name.
1993	Empire Deluxe	Mark Baldwin, Bob Rakowsky	Abstract	DOS, MAC, WIN	Turn-based tactical battles. Remake of Empire: Wargame of the Century.
1993	Fantasy Empires	Silicon Knights	Fantasy	DOS	Successor to Cyber Empires.
1993	Global Domination	Impressions	Historical	AMI, DOS	Grand strategy. Based on the board game, Risk.
1993	Liberty or Death	Koei	Historical	DOS, GEN, NES	Turn-based tactical battles.
1993	Master of Orion	Simtex	Sci-fi	DOS, MAC	4X game. First title in the series.
1993	Operation Europe: Path to Victory (a.k.a. Europa Sensen)	Koei	Historical	DOS, GEN, MSX, NES, SNES	Turn-based strategy.
1993	Starlord	Microprose	Sci-fi	AMI, DOS	Family domination.
1993	Space Empires	Malfador	Sci-fi		4X game. First title in the series.
1993	Warlords II	SSG	Fantasy	DOS, MAC, MOBI	4X game. Sequel to Warlords.
1994	Archon Ultra	Toys for Bob	Fantasy	DOS	Fast-action battles. Remake of Archon: The Light and the Dark.
1994	Colonization, Sid Meier's	MicroProse	Historical	AMI, DOS, MAC, WIN	4X game.
1994	Dark Legions	Silicon Knights	Fantasy	DOS	Fast-action battles. Similar gameplay to Archon: The Light and the Dark.
1994	Battle Isle 2200	Blue Byte	Sci-fi	DOS	Second game in the Battle Isle series.
1994	Hammer of the Gods	Holistic	Fantasy	DOS	4X game. Turn-based tactical battles.
1994	Lords of the Realm	Impressions	Historical	AMI, DOS	Real-time tactical battles. First title in the series.
1994	Master of Magic	Simtex	Fantasy	DOS	4X game. Similar to Master of Orion.
1994	Panzer General	SSI	Historical	3DO, DOS, MAC, PS1, WIN	Operational. First title in the series.
1994	Romance of the Three Kingdoms IV: Wall of Fire	Koei	Historical	GBA, PCE, PS1, S32X, SNES, Wii, WIN3X, WIN9X	Grand strategy. Sequel to Romance of the Three Kingdoms III: Dragon of Destiny.
1994	Nobunaga no Yabou: Tenshoki	Koei	Historical	PC98, PS1, SAT, SNES	Grand strategy.
c. 1995	Global Diplomacy	unknown	Historical	WIN	Grand-strategy. Play-by-email. Based on the board game, Diplomacy.
c. 1995	Age of Discovery	unknown	Historical	WIN	Grand-strategy. Play-by-email. Based on the board game, Diplomacy.
1995	Allied General	SSI	Historical	MAC, PS1, WIN	Operational. Part of the Five Star General series.
1995	Ascendancy	Logic Factory	Sci-fi	DOS	4X game.
1995	Battle Isle 2220	Blue Byte	Sci-fi	WIN	Third game in the Battle Isle series.
1995	Battleground 2: Gettysburg	TalonSoft	Historical	WIN	Sequel to Battleground: Ardennes.
1995	Battleground: Bulge-Ardennes	TalonSoft	Historical	WIN	First title in the series.
1995	Sid Meier's CivNet	MicroProse	Historical	WIN	4X game. Enhanced remake of Sid Meier's Civilization.
1995	Godzilla: Kaijuu no Daishingeki		Kaiju	GG	
1995	Heroes of Might and Magic: A Strategic Quest	New World	Fantasy	DOS, GBC, MAC, WIN	First title in the series.
1995	Nobunaga no Yabou: Returns	Koei	Historical	PS1, SAT	Grand strategy.
1995	Space Empires II	Malfador	Sci-fi	WIN	4X game. Sequel to Space Empires.
1995	Stars!	Jeff Johnson, Jeff McBride	Sci-fi	WIN	4X game.
1995	Worms	Team17	Abstract	AMI, AMI32, DOS, GB, GEN, JAG, PS1, SAT, SNES	Artillery game. First title in the series.
1996	Battleground 3: Waterloo	TalonSoft	Historical	WIN	Sequel to Battleground 2: Gettysburg.
1996	Battleground 4: Shiloh	TalonSoft	Historical	WIN	Sequel to Battleground 3: Waterloo.
1996	Battleground 5: Antietam	TalonSoft	Historical	WIN	Sequel to Battleground 4: Shiloh.
1996	Birthright: The Gorgon's Alliance	Synergistic Software	Fantasy	DOS, WIN	Turn-based strategy.
1996	Chaos Overlords	Stick Man	Sci-fi	MAC, WIN	Turn-based strategy.
1996	MissionForce: CyberStorm	Dynamix	Sci-fi		Turn-Based strategy
1996	Sid Meier's Civilization II	MicroProse	Historical	PS1, MAC, WIN	4X game. Sequel to Sid Meier's Civilization.
1996	Sid Meier's Civilization II: Conflicts in Civilization	MicroProse	Historical	WIN	4X game. Expansion to Sid Meier's Civilization II.
1996	Conquest of the New World	Interplay Entertainment	Historical	DOS, MAC	Turn-based strategy.
1996	Daisenryaku Expert WWII: War in Europe	ASCII	Historical	SNES	Turn-based strategy.
1996	Deadlock: Planetary Conquest	Accolade	Sci-fi	MAC, WIN	4X game.
1996	Emperor of the Fading Suns	Holistic	Sci-fi	WIN	4X game. Based on the RPG Fading Suns.
1996	Fantasy General	SSI	Fantasy	DOS	Operational. Part of the Five Star General series.
1996	Freeciv	Freeciv team	Historical		4X game. Civilization clone.
1996	Heroes of Might and Magic II: The Succession Wars	New World	Fantasy	DOS, MAC, WIN	Sequel to Heroes of Might and Magic: A Strategic Quest.
1996	Lords of the Realm II	Impressions	Historical	DOS, WIN	Real-time tactical battles. Sequel to Lords of the Realm.
1996	M.A.X.: Mechanized Assault & Exploration	Interplay	Sci-fi	DOS, WIN	Turn-based strategy.
1996	Master of Orion II: Battle at Antares	Simtex	Sci-fi	DOS, MAC, WIN	4X game. Sequel to Master of Orion.
1996	Robert E. Lee: Civil War General	Impressions	Historical	WIN	Turn-based strategy.
1996	Slay	Sean O'Connor	Abstract	DROID, iOS, WIN	Turn-based strategy.
1996	Star General	Catware, SSI	Sci-fi	DOS, WIN	Based on The Fleet series of books by David Drake and Bill Fawcett.
1996	Worms: Reinforcements	Team17	Abstract	DOS	Artillery game. Expansion to Worms.
1997	Achtung Spitfire!	Big Time	Historical	MAC, WIN	Strategy wargame. Turn-based tactical battles. Prequel to Over the Reich.
1997	Battleground 6: Napoleon in Russia	TalonSoft	Historical	WIN	Sequel to Battleground 5: Antietam.
1997	Battleground 7: Bull Run	TalonSoft	Historical	WIN	Sequel to Battleground 6: Napoleon in Russia.
1997	Battleground 8: Prelude to Waterloo	TalonSoft	Historical	WIN	Sequel to Battleground 7: Bull Run.
1997	Grant, Lee, Sherman: Civil War Generals 2	Impressions	Historical	WIN	Sequel to Robert E. Lee: Civil War General.
1997	Civilization II: Fantastic Worlds	MicroProse	Fantasy	WIN	4X game. Expansion to Sid Meier's Civilization II.
1997	Conquest of Elysium II	Illwinter	Fantasy	LIN, MAC, WIN	
1997	Fallen Haven	Les Productions Micomeq	Sci-fi	WIN	Turn-based tactical battles.
1997	Heroes of Might and Magic II: The Price of Loyalty	Cyberlore	Fantasy	WIN	Expansion to Heroes of Might and Magic II: The Succession Wars.
1997	Imperialism	Frog City	Historical	MAC, WIN	4X game. Grand strategy.
1997	Lords of Magic	Impressions	Fantasy	WIN	4X game. Spin-off of Lords of the Realm.
1997	Lords of the Realm II: Siege Pack	Impressions	Historical	DOS, WIN	Real-time tactical battles. Expansion to Lords of the Realm II.
1997	Pacific General	SSI	Historical	WIN	Operational. Part of the Five Star General series.
1997	Panzer General II	SSI	Historical	WIN	Operational. Sequel to Panzer General.
1997	Romance of the Three Kingdoms V	Koei	Historical	DOS, GEN, PS1, WIN	Grand strategy. Sequel to Romance of the Three Kingdoms IV: Wall of Fire.
1997	Nobunaga no Yabou: Shouseiroku	Koei	Historical	WIN, DC, PS1, SAT	Grand strategy.
1997	Space Empires III	Malfador	Sci-fi	WIN	4X game. Sequel to Space Empires II.
1997	Spellcross	Cauldron	Sci-fi, Fantasy	DOS	Turn-based tactical battles.
1997	Warlords III: Reign of Heroes	SSG	Fantasy	WIN	4X game. Sequel to Warlords II.
1997	Worms 2	Team17	Abstract	WIN	Artillery game. Sequel to Worms.
1997	Worms: The Director's Cut	Team17	Abstract	AMI	Artillery game. Sequel to Worms.
1997	Combat Chess	Minds Eye Productions	Fantasy	WIN	Chess
1997	Game Boy Wars Turbo	Hudson Soft	Modern	GB	Turn-based strategy. 3rd game in the Wars series. Enhanced version of Game Boy Wars with better AI, more maps, and Super Game Boy support. Only released in JP.
1998	Axis & Allies	Meyer/Glass	Historical	WIN	Grand strategy.
1998	Deadlock II: Shrine Wars	Cyberlore	Sci-fi	WIN	Sequel to Deadlock: Planetary Conquest. More of a remake than a sequel.
1998	Liberation Day	Micomeq	Sci-fi	WIN	Turn-based tactical battles. Sequel to Fallen Haven.
1998	Lords of Magic: Legends of Urak	Impressions	Fantasy	WIN	4X game. Expansion to Lords of Magic.
1998	M.A.X. 2	Interplay Productions	Sci-fi	WIN	Sequel to M.A.X.: Mechanized Assault & Exploration.
1998	The Operational Art of War I: 1939-1955	TalonSoft	Historical	WIN	Operational. First title in the series.
1998	People's General	SSI	Historical	WIN	Operational. Part of the Five Star General series.
1998	Tom Clancy's ruthless.com	Red Storm Entertainment	Business	WIN	Turn-based corporate empire building.
1998	Warlords III: Darklords Rising	SSG	Fantasy	WIN	4X game. Expansion to Warlords III: Reign of Heroes.
1998	Super Famicom Wars	Intelligent Systems	Modern	SNES	Turn-based strategy. 4th game in the Wars series. Enhanced remake of Famicom Wars. Exclusively released via the Nintendo Power service. Only released in JP.
1998	Game Boy Wars 2	Hudson Soft	Modern	GB, GBC	Turn-based strategy. 5th game in the Wars series. Only released in JP.
1999	Age of Wonders	Triumph	Fantasy	WIN	4X game.
1999	Sid Meier's Alpha Centauri	Firaxis	Sci-fi	MAC, WIN	4X game.
1999	Sid Meier's Alien Crossfire	Firaxis	Sci-fi	MAC, WIN	4X game. Expansion to Sid Meier's Alpha Centauri.
1999	Arcomage	New World	Fantasy	WIN	Card battle. Mini-game in the Might and Magic series.
1999	Axis & Allies: Iron Blitz	ATARI	Historical	WIN	Grand strategy. Remake of Axis & Allies.
1999	Battleground 9: Chickamauga	TalonSoft	Historical	WIN	Sequel to Battleground 8: Prelude to Waterloo.
1999	Civilization II: Test of Time	MicroProse	Historical	WIN	4X game. Expansion to Sid Meier's Civilization II.
1999	Civilization: Call to Power	Activision	Historical	LIN, MAC, WIN	4X game. Spin-off of Sid Meier's Civilization.
1999	Disciples: Sacred Lands	Strategy First	Fantasy	WIN	4X game. First title in the series.
1999	Heroes of Might and Magic III: The Restoration of Erathia	New World	Fantasy	LIN, MAC, WIN	Sequel to Heroes of Might and Magic II: The Succession Wars.
1999	Heroes of Might and Magic III: Armageddon's Blade	New World	Fantasy	WIN	Expansion to Heroes of Might and Magic III: The Restoration of Erathia.
1999	Imperialism II: Age of Exploration	Frog City	Historical	MAC, WIN	4X game. Sequel to Imperialism.
1999	King of Dragon Pass	A Sharp	Fantasy	MAC, WIN	In many ways like an interactive novel.
1999	Nobunaga no Yabou: Reppuuden	Koei	Historical	WIN, DC, PS1	Grand strategy.
1999	The Operational Art of War II: Flashpoint Kosovo	TalonSoft	Historical	WIN	Operational. Expansion to The Operational Art of War II: Modern Battles 1956-2000.
1999	The Operational Art of War II: Modern Battles 1956-2000	TalonSoft	Historical	WIN	Operational. Sequel to The Operational Art of War I: 1939-1955.
1999	Panzer General 3D Assault	SSI	Historical	WIN	Operational. Sequel to Panzer General II.
1999	Star Trek: Birth of the Federation	MicroProse	Sci-fi	WIN	4X game
1999	Warhammer 40,000: Rites of War	SSI	Sci-fi	WIN	Operational. Part of the Five Star General series.
1999	Worms Armageddon	Team17	Abstract	DC, GBC, N64, PS1, WIN	Artillery game.
1999	Jagged Alliance 2	Sir-Tech Canada	Modern	WIN, MAC, LIN	Tactical role-playing game.
2000	Call to Power II	Activision	Historical	WIN	4X game. Sequel to Civilization: Call to Power.
2000	Heroes of Might and Magic III: The Shadow of Death	New World	Fantasy	WIN	Expansion to Heroes of Might and Magic III: The Restoration of Erathia.
2000	Hogs of War	Sheffield House	Abstract	PS1, WIN	Artillery game.
2000	The Operational Art of War II: Elite Edition	TalonSoft	Historical	WIN	Operational. Re-release of The Operational Art of War II: Modern Battles 1956-2000 and The Operational Art of War II: Flashpoint Kosovo.
2000	The Operational Art of War: Century of Warfare	TalonSoft	Historical	WIN	Operational. Re-release of The Operational Art of War I: 1939-1955, The Operational Art of War II: Modern Battles 1956-2000 and The Operational Art of War II: Flashpoint Kosovo.
2000	Panzer General III: Scorched Earth	Mattel	Historical	WIN	Operational. Sequel to Panzer General 3D Assault.
2000	Reach for the Stars	SSG	Sci-fi	WIN	4X game. Remake of Reach for the Stars for DOS.
2000	Romance of the Three Kingdoms VI: Awakening of the Dragon	Koei	Historical	PS1, PSP, WIN	Grand strategy. Sequel to Romance of the Three Kingdoms VI: Awakening of the Dragon.
2000	Romance of the Three Kingdoms VII	Koei	Historical	PS2, PSP, WIN	Grand strategy. Sequel to Romance of the Three Kingdoms VII.
2000	Battle Isle: The Andosia War	Cauldron	Sci-fi	WIN	Fifth game in the Battle Isle series.
2000	Shogun: Total War	Creative Assembly	Historical	WIN	Grand strategy. Turn-based campaign map with real-time tactical battles.
2000	Space Empires IV	Malfador	Sci-fi	WIN	4X game. Sequel to Space Empires III.
2001	Sid Meier's Civilization III	Firaxis	Historical	MAC, WIN	4X game. Sequel to Sid Meier's Civilization II.
2001	Etherlords	Nival Interactive	Fantasy	WIN	Turn-based tactical battles.
2001	Heroes of Might and Magic: Quest for the Dragon Bone Staff	New World	Fantasy	PS2	Spin-off of Heroes of Might and Magic: A Strategic Quest.
2001	Pocket Tanks	Blitwise	Sci-fi	WIN	Artillery game.
2001	Scorched 3D	Gavin Camp	Abstract	LIN, MAC, WIN	Artillery game.
2001	Nobunaga no Yabou: Ranseiki	Koei	Historical	WIN, XBOX	Grand strategy.
2001	TripleA	TripleA team	Historical		Grand strategy. Clone of the board game, Axis and Allies.
2001	Shogun: Total War - The Mongol invasion	Creative Assembly	Historical	WIN	Grand strategy. Turn-based campaign map with real-time tactical battles. Expansion to Shogun: Total War.
2001	Worms World Party	Team17	Abstract	DC, GBA, NGE, PS1, WIN, MOBI	Artillery game.
2001	Game Boy Wars 3	Hudson Soft	Modern	GBC	Turned-based strategy. 6th game in the Wars series. Only released in JP. First game in the series to feature a campaign mode.
2001	Advance Wars	Intelligent Systems	Modern	GBA	Turn-based strategy. 7th game in the Wars series, 1st in the Advance Wars sub-series. Not released in JP until 2004 in the compilation Game Boy Wars Advance 1+2, along with Advance Wars 2: Black Hole Rising.
2002	Age of Wonders II: The Wizard's Throne	Triumph	Fantasy	WIN	4X game. Sequel to Age of Wonders
2002	Civilization III: Play the World	Firaxis	Historical	WIN	4X game. Expansion to Sid Meier's Civilization III.
2002	Disciples II: Dark Prophecy	Strategy First	Fantasy	WIN	4X game. Sequel to Disciples: Sacred Lands.
2002	Dominions: Priests, Prophets and Pretenders	Illwinter	Fantasy	LIN, MAC, WIN	First title in the series.
2002	Empire Deluxe Internet Edition	Killer Bee Software	Abstract	WIN	Turn based strategy. Remake of Empire Deluxe.
2002	Heroes of Might and Magic IV	New World	Fantasy	MAC, WIN	Sequel to Heroes of Might and Magic III: The Restoration of Erathia.
2002	Heroes of Might and Magic IV: The Gathering Storm	New World	Fantasy	WIN	Expansion to Heroes of Might and Magic IV.
2002	Medieval: Total War	Creative Assembly	Historical	WIN	Grand strategy. Turn-based campaign map with real-time tactical battles.
2002	MoonBase Commander	Humongous	Sci-fi	WIN	Turn-based strategy.
2002	Astral Tournament	Apus Software	Fantasy	WIN	turn-based strategy card game.
2002	Nobunaga no Yabou: Soutensoku	Koei	Historical	WIN	Grand strategy.
2002	Romance of the Three Kingdoms VIII	Koei	Historical	PS2, PSP, WIN	Grand strategy. Sequel to Romance of the Three Kingdoms VIII.
2002	Strategic Command: European Theater	Fury	Historical	WIN	Turn-based strategy.
2003	Age of Wonders: Shadow Magic	Triumph	Fantasy	WIN	4X game. Sequel to Age of Wonders II: The Wizard's Throne
2003	Civilization III: Conquests	BreakAway, Firaxis	Historical	WIN	4X game. Expansion to Sid Meier's Civilization III.
2003	Disciples II: Guardians of the Light	Strategy First	Fantasy	WIN	4X game. Expansion to Disciples II: Dark Prophecy.
2003	Disciples II: Rise of the Elves	Strategy First	Fantasy	WIN	4X game. Expansion to Disciples II: Dark Prophecy.
2003	Disciples II: Servants of the Dark	Strategy First	Fantasy	WIN	4X game. Expansion to Disciples II: Dark Prophecy.
2003	Dominions II: The Ascension Wars	Illwinter	Fantasy	LIN, MAC, WIN	Sequel to Dominions: Priests, Prophets and Pretenders.
2003	Etherlords II	Nival Interactive	Fantasy	WIN	Turn-Based tactical battles. Sequel to Etherlords.
2003	Galactic Civilizations	Stardock	Sci-fi	WIN	4X game. First title in the series.
2003	Heroes of Might and Magic IV: Winds of War	New World	Fantasy	WIN	Expansion to Heroes of Might and Magic IV.
2003	Massive Assault	Wargaming	Sci-fi	MAC, WIN	Turn-based strategy.
2003	Master of Orion III	Quicksilver	Sci-fi	MAC, WIN	4X game. Sequel to Master of Orion II: Battle at Antares.
2003	Medieval: Total War - Viking Invasion	Creative Assembly	Historical	WIN	Grand strategy. Turn-based campaign map with real-time tactical battles. Expansion to Medieval: Total War.
2003	Romance of the Three Kingdoms IX	Koei	Historical	PS2, WIN	Grand strategy. Sequel to Romance of the Three Kingdoms IX.
2003	Nobunaga's Ambition: Rise to Power (a.k.a. Nobunaga no Yabou: Tenka Souhei)	Koei	Historical	WIN, PS2	Grand strategy.
2003	Space Rangers	Elemental Games	Sci-fi	WIN	Operational
2003	Star Chamber: The Harbinger Saga	Worlds Apart	Sci-fi	WIN	Card battle.
2003	Warlords IV: Heroes of Etheria	Infinite	Fantasy	WIN	4X game. Sequel to Warlords III: Reign of Heroes.
2003	Worms 3D	Team17	Abstract	GCN, MAC, PS2, WIN, XBOX	Artillery game. Sequel to Worms 2.
2003	Silent Storm	Nival, 1C Company	Modern	WIN	Tactical role-playing game, Turn-based tactics
2003	Advance Wars 2: Black Hole Rising	Intelligent Systems	Modern	GBA	Turn-based strategy. 8th game in the Wars series, 2nd in the Advance Wars sub-series. Not released in JP until 2004 in the compilation Game Boy Wars Advance 1+2, along with Advance Wars.
2004	Anacreon: Imperial Conquest in the Far Future	George Moromisato	Sci-fi	WIN	4X game. Remake of Anacreon: Reconstruction 4021.
2004	Empire Deluxe Enhanced Edition	Killer Bee Software	Abstract	WIN	Turn based strategy. Expansion of Empire Deluxe.
2004	Galactic Civilizations: Altarian Prophecy	Stardock	Sci-fi	WIN	4X game. Expansion to Galactic Civilizations.
2004	Massive Assault Network	Wargaming	Sci-fi	WIN	Turn-based tactical battles.
2004	Rome: Total War	Creative Assembly	Historical	WIN	Grand strategy. Turn-based campaign map with real-time tactical battles.
2004	Space Rangers 2: Dominators	Elemental Games	Sci-fi	WIN	Operational
2004	Spartan	Slitherine	Historical	WIN	4X game. Real-time tactical battles.
2004	Strength & Honour	Magitech	Historical	WIN	4X game. Real-time tactical battles.
2004	Worms Forts: Under Siege	Team17	Abstract	PS2, WIN, XBOX	Artillery game.
2005	The Battle for Wesnoth	David White	Fantasy	LIN, MAC, WIN	Open-source project.
2005	Sid Meier's Civilization IV	Firaxis	Historical	MAC, WIN	4X game. Sequel to Sid Meier's Civilization III.
2005	Daisenryaku Portable	Genki	Historical	PSP	Turn-based strategy.
2005	Massive Assault: Phantom Renaissance (aka Domination)	Wargaming	Sci-fi	MAC, WIN	Turn-based tactical battles. Sequel to Massive Assault
2005	Romance of the Three Kingdoms X	Koei	Historical	PS2, WIN	Grand strategy. Sequel to Romance of the Three Kingdoms X.
2005	Nobunaga's Ambition: Iron Triangle (a.k.a. Nobunaga no Yabou: Kakushin)	Koei	Historical	WIN, PS2, Wii	Grand strategy.
2005	Rome: Total War: Barbarian Invasion	Creative Assembly	Historical	WIN	Grand strategy. Turn-based campaign map with real-time tactical battles. Expansion to Rome: Total War.
2005	Generation of Chaos	Idea Factory	Fantasy	PSP	Real-time tactical battles. Fourth title in the series.
2005	Worms 4: Mayhem	Team17	Abstract	PS2, WIN, XBOX	Artillery game. Sequel to Worms 3D.
2005	Advance Wars: Dual Strike / Famicom Wars DS (JP)	Intelligent Systems	Modern	DS	Turn-based strategy. 9th game in the Wars series, 3rd in the Advance Wars sub-series. Uses the DS's dual screens to display two simultaneous battles in some levels.
2006	Dominions 3: The Awakening	Illwinter	Fantasy	LIN, MAC, WIN	Sequel to Dominions II: The Ascension Wars.
2006	Aedis Eclipse: Generation of Chaos	Idea Factory	Fantasy	PSP	Real-time tactical battles. Sequel to Generation of Chaos.
2006	C-evo	Steffen Gerlach	Historical	WIN	4X game. Civilization clone.
2006	Sid Meier's Civilization IV: Warlords	Firaxis	Historical	MAC, WIN	4X game. Expansion to Sid Meier's Civilization IV.
2006	Galactic Civilizations II: Dread Lords	Stardock	Sci-fi	WIN	4X game. Sequel to Galactic Civilizations.
2006	Heroes of Might and Magic V	Nival	Fantasy	WIN	Sequel to Heroes of Might and Magic IV.
2006	Heroes of Might and Magic V: Hammers of Fate	Nival	Fantasy	WIN	Expansion to Heroes of Might and Magic V.
2006	Massive Assault Network 2	Wargaming	Sci-fi	WIN	Turn-based tactical battles. Sequel to Massive Assault Network
2006	The Operational Art of War III	Matrix	Historical	WIN	Operational. Sequel to The Operational Art of War II: Modern Battles 1956-2000.
2006	Romance of the Three Kingdoms XI	Koei	Historical	PS2, WIN	Grand strategy. Sequel to Romance of the Three Kingdoms XI.
2006	Rome: Total War: Alexander	Creative Assembly	Historical	WIN	Grand strategy. Turn-based campaign map with real-time tactical battles. Expansion to Rome: Total War.
2006	Space Empires V	Malfador	Sci-fi	WIN	4X game. Sequel to Space Empires IV.
2006	Sword of the Stars	Kerberos	Sci-fi	WIN	4X game. Real-time tactical battles.
2006	Worms: Open Warfare	Team17	Abstract	DS, PSP	Artillery game.
2007	Sid Meier's Civilization IV: Beyond the Sword	Firaxis	Historical	MAC, WIN	4X game. Expansion to Sid Meier's Civilization IV.
2007	Darkwind: War on Wheels	Psychic Software	Sci-fi	MAC, WIN	Post-apocalyptic car combat.
2007	Fantasy Wars	Ino-Co Plus	Fantasy	WIN	Turn-Based Strategy.
2007	Commander: Europe at War	Slitherine Software, Firepower Entertainment	Historical	DS, MAC, PSP, WIN	Turn-Based Strategy.
2007	Galactic Civilizations II: Dark Avatar	Stardock	Sci-fi	WIN	4X game. Expansion to Galactic Civilizations II: Dread Lords.
2007	Heroes of Might and Magic V: Tribes of the East	Nival	Fantasy	WIN	Expansion to Heroes of Might and Magic V.
2007	Making History: The Calm & The Storm	Muzzy Lane	Historical	WIN	Grand strategy.
2007	Medieval II: Total War: Kingdoms	Creative Assembly	Historical	WIN	Grand strategy. Turn-based campaign map with real-time tactical battles. Expansion to Medieval II: Total War.
2007	Medieval II: Total War	Creative Assembly	Historical	WIN	Grand strategy. Turn-based campaign map with real-time tactical battles. Sequel to Medieval: Total War.
2007	Sword of the Stars: Born in Blood	Kerberos	Sci-fi	WIN	4X game. Real-time tactical battles. Expansion to Sword of the Stars.
2007	Worms	Team17	Abstract	X360, PS3	Artillery game.
2007	Worms: Open Warfare 2	Team17	Abstract	DS, PSP	Artillery game. Sequel to Worms: Open Warfare.
2008	Age of Empires: Mythologies	Griptonite Games	Historical	DS	Turn-Based Strategy.
2008	Sid Meier's Civilization IV: Colonization	Firaxis	Historical	WIN	4X game. Remake of Sid Meier's Colonization.
2008	Galactic Civilizations II: Twilight of the Arnor	Stardock	Sci-fi	WIN	4X game. Expansion to Galactic Civilizations II: Dread Lords.
2008	King's Bounty: The Legend	Katauri Interactive	Fantasy	WIN, MAC	spiritual sequel to King's Bounty
2008	Sword of the Stars: A Murder of Crows	Kerberos	Sci-fi	WIN	4X game. Real-time tactical battles. Expansion to Sword of the Stars.
2008	Worms: A Space Oddity	Team17	Abstract	Wii	Artillery game.
2008	Advance Wars: Days of Ruin (NA) / Dark Conflict (EU)	Intelligent Systems	Modern	DS	Turn-based strategy. 12th game in the Wars series, 4th in the Advance Wars sub-series. New setting, more serious and grim than previous games.
2009	Armada 2526	Ntronium Games	Sci-fi	WIN	4X game. Real-time tactical battles.
2009	Blood Bowl	Cyanide	Fantasy	DS, PSP, WIN, X360	Turn-based tactics and strategy.
2009	Empire: Total War	Creative Assembly	Historical	WIN	Grand strategy. Turn-based campaign map with real-time tactical battles.
2009	King's Bounty: Armored Princess	Katauri Interactive	Fantasy	WIN	Sequel to King's Bounty: The Legend
2009	Panzer General: Allied Assault	Petroglyph Games	Historical	X360	Clone of the board game.
2009	Nobunaga no Yabou: Tendou	Koei	Historical	WIN, PS3, X360	Grand strategy.
2009	Operation Barbarossa – The Struggle for Russia	Binary Evolution Studios	Historical	WIN	Operational.
2009	Worms 2: Armageddon	Team17	Abstract	X360, PS3, iOS, DROID	Artillery game. Re-release of Worms: Armageddon.
2009	Field of Glory	Hexwar	Historical	MAC, WIN	First game in the Field of Glory series
2010	Sid Meier's Civilization V	Firaxis Games	Historical	MAC, WIN	4X game. Sequel to Sid Meier's Civilization IV
2010	King's Bounty: Crossworlds	Katauri Interactive	Fantasy	WIN	Expansion to King's Bounty: Armored Princess
2010	Elven Legacy	Ino-Co Plus	Fantasy	MAC, WIN	Turn-Based Strategy. Sequel to Fantasy Wars
2010	Napoleon: Total War	Creative Assembly	Historical	WIN	Grand strategy. Turn-based campaign map with real-time tactical battles.
2010	Disciples III: Renaissance	Akella	Fantasy	WIN	4X game. Sequel to Disciples II: Dark Prophecy.
2010	Elemental: War of Magic	Stardock	Fantasy	WIN	4X game with a fantasy theme, combining role-playing elements.
2010	Battle Dex	Bandera Games	Contemporary	WIN	Card battle game
2010	Ancient Trader	4Kids Games	Fantasy	WIN, X360, iOS	
2010	Future Wars	Radon Labs	Sci-fi	WIN	Turn-based strategy.
2010	Greed Corp	W!Games	Sci-fi	PS3, WIN, X360	Turn-based strategy.
2010	Battle Academy	Slitherine Software	Historical	WIN	Turn-based strategy.
2010	Worms: Battle Islands	Team17	Abstract	PSP, Wii	Artillery game.
2010	Worms Reloaded	Team17	Abstract	LIN, MAC, WIN	Artillery game.
2010	Thousand Parsec	Tim Ansell, Lee Begg	Sci-fi		4X game. Game engine. A playable development version can be downloaded.
2011	Iron Grip: Marauders	ISOTX	Sci-fi	MAC, WIN	Turn-based strategy.
2011	Battle vs. Chess	Targem Games	Fantasy	WIN, MAC, LIN, PS3, X360, Wii	Turn-based strategy.
2011	Might & Magic Heroes VI	Black Hole Entertainment	Fantasy	WIN	4X game. Sequel to Heroes of Might and Magic V.
2011	Total War: Shogun 2	Creative Assembly	Historical	WIN	Grand strategy. Turn-based campaign map with real-time tactical battles.
2011	Panzer Corps	The Lordz Games Studio, Flashback Games	Historical	iOS, MAC, WIN	Wargame
2011	Worms Ultimate Mayhem	Team17	Abstract	PS3, WIN, X360	Artillery game. Re-release of Worms 4: Mayhem.
2011	Dawn of Magic	Lakoo	Fantasy	iOS, DROID	Turn-based strategy RPG.
2012	Battle of the Bulge	Shenandoah Studio	Historical	MAC, WIN	Turn-based strategy. Wargame
2012	Elemental: Fallen Enchantress	Stardock	Fantasy	WIN	4X game.
2012	Endless Space	Amplitude Studios	Sci-fi	WIN	4X game.
2012	King's Bounty: Warriors of the North	1C-Softclub	Fantasy	WIN	Sequel to King's Bounty: Armored Princess
2012	Warlock: Master of the Arcane	Ino-Co Plus	Fantasy	WIN	4X game.
2012	Worms Revolution	Team17	Abstract	MAC, PS3, PSV, WIN, X360	Artillery game.
2013	Expeditions: Conquistador	Logic Artists	Historical	LIN, MAC, WIN	Turn-based strategy RPG.
2013	Nobunaga's Ambition: Sphere of Influence (a.k.a. Nobunaga no Yabou: Souzou)	Koei	Historical	WIN, PS3, PS4	Grand strategy.
2013	Total War: Rome II	The Creative Assembly	Historical	WIN, MAC, LIN	Grand strategy. Turn-based campaign map with real-time tactical battles.
2013	Worms 3	Team17	Abstract	iOS, MAC	Artillery game.
2013	Worms Clan Wars	Team17	Abstract	WIN	Artillery game.
2013	Pandora: First Contact	Proxy Studios	Sci-fi	LIN, MAC, WIN	4X game.
2013	Battle Worlds: Kronos	King Art Games	Sci-fi	LIN, MAC, WIN	Wargame.
2014	Age of Wonders III	Triumph	Fantasy	WIN	4X game. Sequel to Age of Wonders: Shadow Magic
2014	Sid Meier's Civilization: Beyond Earth	Firaxis Games	Sci-fi	MAC, LIN, WIN	4X game.
2014	Endless Legend	Amplitude Studios	Fantasy	WIN	4X game.
2014	King's Bounty: Dark Side	1C-Softclub	Fantasy	WIN	Sequel to King's Bounty: Warriors of the North
2014	The Last Federation	Arcen Games	Sci-fi	LIN, MAC, WIN	4X game. Turn-Based tactical battles.
2014	Battle Academy 2: Eastern Front	Slitherine Software	Historical	WIN	Turn-based strategy.
2014	Warhammer 40,000: Armageddon	Flashback Games, The Lordz Games Studio	Sci-fi	iOS, MAC, WIN	Wargame
2014	Warlock II: The Exiled	Ino-Co Plus	Fantasy	MAC, WIN	4X game.
2015	Galactic Civilizations III	Stardock	Sci-fi	WIN	4X Turn-based strategy, 64 bit only, DX10 +
2015	Making History: The Great War	Muzzy Lane Software	Historical	LIN, MAC, WIN	Turn-based strategy.
2015	Might & Magic Heroes VII	Limbic Entertainment	Fantasy	WIN	Sequel to Might & Magic Heroes VI.
2015	Sid Meier's Starships	Firaxis Games	Sci-fi	MAC, WIN	4X game. Turn-based tactical battles.
2015	Order of Battle: Pacific	The Artistocrats	Historical	MAC, WIN, PS4, XOne	Wargame.
2015	Sorcerer King	Stardock	Fantasy	WIN	4X Turn-based strategy.
2015	Star Hammer: The Vanguard Prophecy	Black Lab Games	Sci-fi	WIN, MAC, iOS, XOne, PS4	Turn-based strategy.
2015	Total War: Attila	The Creative Assembly	Historical	LIN, MAC, WIN	Grand strategy. Turn-based campaign map with real-time tactical battles.
2015	Warhammer 40,000: Regicide	Hammerfall Publishing	Sci-fi	WIN	Turn-based strategy.
2016	Gremlins, Inc.	Charlie Oscar	Fantasy	LIN, MAC, WIN	Turn-based strategy. Digital board game.
2016	Sorcerer King: Rivals	Stardock	Fantasy	WIN	4X Turn-based strategy.
2016	Total War: Warhammer	The Creative Assembly	Fantasy	WIN, OSX, LIN	Grand strategy. Turn-based campaign map with real-time tactical battles.
2016	The Battle of Polytopia	Midjiwan AB	Historical	WIN, iOS, MAC, MOBI	4X game. Play against AI, or against other players.
2016	Sid Meier's Civilization VI	Firaxis Games	Historical	MAC, WIN, LIN	4X game. Sequel to Civilization V
2016	Endless Space 2	Amplitude Studios	Sci-fi	WIN	Turn-based Strategy
2016	Tahira: Echoes of the Astral Empire	Whale Hammer Games	Sci-fi	LIN, MAC, WIN	Turn-based Strategy
2017	Mario + Rabbids Kingdom Battle	Ubisoft Milan, Ubisoft Paris	Sci-fi	NX	Turn-based Strategy
2017	Warhammer 40,000: Sanctus Reach	Straylight Entertainment	Sci-fi	WIN	Turn-based Strategy
2017	Nobunaga's Ambition: Taishi (a.k.a. Nobunaga no Yabou: Taishi)	Koei	Historical	WIN, PS4, NX	Grand strategy.
2017	Total War: Warhammer II	The Creative Assembly	Fantasy	WIN, OSX, LIN	Grand strategy. Turn-based campaign map with real-time tactical battles.
2017	Battlestar Galactica: Deadlock	Black Lab Games	Sci-fi	WIN, XOne, PS4	Turn-based Strategy with additional elements of RTS and 4X gameplay
2017	Stars in Shadow	Ashdar Games	Sci-fi	WIN	4X turn-based strategy and tactics
2017	Field of Glory II	Byzantine Games	Historical	WIN	Second game in the Field of Glory series
2017	Antihero	Tim Conkling	Historical	WIN, MAC	
2017	Expeditions: Viking	Logic Artists	Historical	WIN	Turn-based strategy RPG. Sequel to Expeditions: Conquistador
2018	Chessaria: The Tactical Adventure	Pixel Wizards	Fantasy	MAC, WIN	Turn-based strategy. Digital board game.
2018	Into the Breach	Subset Games	Sci-fi	LIN, MAC, WIN, NX	Turn-based strategy.
2018	Warhammer 40,000: Gladius – Relics of War	Proxy Studios	Sci-fi	LIN, WIN	4X game.
2018	Total War Saga: Thrones of Britannia	The Creative Assembly	Historical	WIN, MAC, LIN	Grand strategy. Turn-based campaign map with real-time tactical battles.
2018	Aggressors: Ancient Rome	Kubat Software	Historical	WIN	4X game. Grand strategy.
2019	Age of Wonders: Planetfall	Triumph	Sci-fi	WIN	4X game.
2019	Clans to Kingdoms	Clans to Kingdoms	Historical	WIN	Turn-Based Strategy, 4X, city building game.
2019	Field of Glory: Empires	AGEod	Historical	WIN	Third game in the Field of Glory series
2019	Interstellar Space: Genesis	Praxis Games	Sci-fi	WIN	4X turn-based strategy and tactics
2019	Total War: Three Kingdoms	The Creative Assembly	Historical	LIN, MAC, WIN	Grand strategy. Turn-based campaign map with real-time tactical battles.
2020	Panzer Corps 2	Flashback Games	Historical	WIN	Sequel to Panzer Corps
2020	Imperiums: Greek Wars	Kube Games	Historical	WIN	4X game. Grand strategy.
2020	Total War Saga: Troy	The Creative Assembly	Historical	WIN, OSX, LIN	Grand strategy. Turn-based campaign map with real-time tactical battles.
2020	Touhou LostWord	NextNinja	Fantasy	DROID, iOS	Gacha game
2021	Field of Glory II: Medieval	Byzantine Games	Historical	WIN	Fourth game in the Field of Glory series
2021	Humankind	Amplitude Studios	Historical	WIN, Stadia, MAC, PS4, PS5, XOne, XSX/S	4X game.
2021	King's Bounty II	1C Entertainment	Fantasy	WIN	Sequel to King's Bounty
2021	Disciples: Liberation	Frima Studio	Fantasy	WIN	Sequel to Disciples III: Renaissance.
2021	The Protagonist: EX-1	3Mind Games	Sci-fi	WIN, PS4, XOne, NX	Turn-based strategy.
2021	King Arthur: Knight's Tale	NeocoreGames	Fantasy	WIN, PS5, XSX/S	Turn-based strategy RPG.
2022	Expeditions: Rome	Logic Artists	Historical	WIN	Turn-based strategy RPG. Sequel to Expeditions: Viking
2022	Mario + Rabbids Sparks of Hope	Ubisoft Milan, Ubisoft Paris	Sci-fi	NX	Turn-based Strategy
2022	Nobunaga's Ambition: Awakening (a.k.a. Nobunaga no Yabou: Shinsei)	Koei	Historical	WIN, PS4, NX	Grand strategy.
2022	Total War: Warhammer III	The Creative Assembly	Fantasy	WIN, OSX, LIN	Grand strategy. Turn-based campaign map with real-time tactical battles.
2023	Limbus Company	Project Moon	Fantasy	Microsoft Windows, iOS, Android, Linux	Action role-playing
2023	SpellForce: Conquest of Eo	Owned by Gravity	Fantasy	WIN	
2023	Age of Wonders 4	Triumph	Fantasy	WIN	4X game. Sequel to Age of Wonders III
2023	FreeCol	FreeCol team	Historical		4X game. Colonization clone.
2023	Advance Wars 1+2: Re-Boot Camp	WayForward	Modern	NX	Turn-based strategy. 13th game in the Wars series, 5th in the Advance Wars sub-series. Remake of Advance Wars 1 and Advance Wars 2: Black Hole Rising.
2024	South Pole Bebop	Sentience Inc.	Modern	WIN	Turn-based strategy. Multiplayer. Inspired By Into The Breach. A playable demo is available on Steam.
2024	Field of Glory: Kingdoms	AGEod	Historical	WIN	Fifth game in the Field of Glory series
2025	Sid Meier's Civilization VII	Firaxis Games	Historical		4X game. Sequel to Civilization VI
TBA	FreeOrion	FreeOrion team	Sci-fi		4X game. A playable development version can be downloaded.
