= List of PC games (B) =

The following page is an alphabetical section from the list of PC games.

== B ==
Name	Developer	Publisher	Genre(s)	Operating system(s)	Date released
Backyard Baseball	Humongous Entertainment	Humongous Entertainment	Sports video game	Microsoft Windows, Classic Mac OS	10 October 1997
Balatro	LocalThunk	Playstack	Roguelike deck-building	Microsoft Windows, Mac OS	20 February 2024
Baldur's Gate	BioWare	Black Isle Studios, Interplay Entertainment	Role-playing	Microsoft Windows, macOS	21 December 1998
Baldur's Gate: Tales of the Sword Coast	BioWare	Black Isle Studios, Interplay Entertainment	Role-playing	Microsoft Windows, macOS	30 April 1999
Baldur's Gate II: Shadows of Amn	BioWare	Black Isle Studios, Interplay Entertainment	Role-playing	Microsoft Windows, macOS	24 September 2000
Baldur's Gate II: Throne of Bhaal	BioWare	Black Isle Studios, Interplay Entertainment	Role-playing Microsoft Windows, macOS	Microsoft Windows, macOS	21 June 2001
Baldur's Gate III	Larian Studios	Larian Studios	Role-playing	Microsoft Windows, macOS	3 August 2023
Banished	Shining Rock Software	Shining Rock Software	City building, strategy	Microsoft Windows	18 February 2014
Bastion	Supergiant Games	Warner Bros. Interactive Entertainment	Action, role-playing	Microsoft Windows, Linux, macOS	16 August 2011
Batman: Arkham Asylum	Rocksteady Studios	Warner Bros. Interactive Entertainment	Action, adventure	Microsoft Windows, macOS	15 September 2009
Batman: Arkham City	Rocksteady Studios	Warner Bros. Interactive Entertainment	Action, adventure	Microsoft Windows, macOS	18 October 2011
Batman: Arkham Knight	Rocksteady Studios	Warner Bros. Interactive Entertainment	Action, adventure	Microsoft Windows	2 June 2015
Batman: Arkham Origins	WB Games Montréal, Splash Damage	Warner Bros. Interactive Entertainment	Action, adventure	Microsoft Windows	25 October 2013
BattleBlock Theater	The Behemoth	The Behemoth	Platformer	Microsoft Windows, Linux	15 May 2014
Battlefield 1942	Digital Illusions CE	Electronic Arts	First-person shooter	Microsoft Windows, macOS	10 September 2002
Battlefield 1942: The Road to Rome	Digital Illusions CE	Electronic Arts	First-person shooter	Microsoft Windows	2 February 2003
Battlefield 1942: Secret Weapons of WWII	Digital Illusions CE	Electronic Arts	First-person shooter	Microsoft Windows, macOS	4 September 2003
Battlefield 2	Digital Illusions CE	EA Games	First-person shooter	Microsoft Windows	21 June 2005
Battlefield 2142	EA Digital Illusions CE	Electronic Arts	First-person shooter	Microsoft Windows, macOS	17 October 2006
Battlefield 3	EA Digital Illusions CE	Sega, Electronic Arts	First-person shooter	Microsoft Windows	25 October 2011
Battlefield 4	EA Digital Illusions CE	Electronic Arts	First-person shooter	Microsoft Windows	29 October 2013
Battlefield Heroes	EA Digital Illusions CE, Easy Studios	Electronic Arts, Aeria Games	First-person shooter	Microsoft Windows	25 June 2009
Battlefield Play4Free	EA Digital Illusions CE, Easy Studios	Electronic Arts	First-person shooter	Microsoft Windows	4 April 2011
Battlefield V	EA Digital Illusions CE	Electronic Arts	First-person shooter	Microsoft Windows	19 October 2018
Battleforge	EA Phenomic	Electronic Arts	RTS	Microsoft Windows	23 March 2009
Battleground 2: Gettysburg	TalonSoft	TalonSoft	Turn-based strategy, real-time tactics	Microsoft Windows	31 December 1995
Battleground 3: Waterloo	TalonSoft	TalonSoft	Turn-based strategy, real-time tactics	Microsoft Windows	31 May 1996
Battleground 4: Shiloh	TalonSoft	TalonSoft	Turn-based strategy, real-time tactics	Microsoft Windows	31 January 1996
Battleground 5: Antietam	TalonSoft	TalonSoft	Turn-based strategy, real-time tactics	Microsoft Windows	31 December 1996
Battleground 6: Napoleon in Russia	TalonSoft	TalonSoft	Turn-based strategy, real-time tactics	Microsoft Windows	30 March 1997
Battleground 7: Bull Run	TalonSoft	TalonSoft	Turn-based strategy, real-time tactics	Microsoft Windows	30 March 1997
Battleground 8: Prelude to Waterloo	TalonSoft	TalonSoft	Turn-based strategy, real-time tactics	Microsoft Windows	1997
Battleground 9: Chickamauga	TalonSoft	TalonSoft	Turn-based strategy, real-time tactics	Microsoft Windows	1998
Battleground 10: Middle East	TalonSoft	TalonSoft	Turn-based strategy, real-time tactics	Microsoft Windows	1997
Battleground 11: East Front	TalonSoft	TalonSoft	Turn-based strategy, real-time tactics	Microsoft Windows	1997
Battlehawks 1942	Lucasfilm Games	Lucasfilm Games	Flight simulation	MS-DOS, Amiga, Atari ST	October 1988
Battles in Time	Quantum Quality Productions, American Laser Games	Quantum Quality Productions	Strategy	Microsoft Windows	1995
Battles of Napoleon	Chuck Kroegel, David Landrey	Strategic Simulations, Inc.	Wargame	Apple II, Commodore 64, MS-DOS	1988
Battleship: Surface Thunder	Hasbro Interactive	Hasbro Interactive	Action	Microsoft Windows	12 September 2000
Beam Breakers	Similis Software GmbH	JoWooD Productions Software	Futuristic racing	Microsoft Windows	31 October 2002
BeamNG.drive	BeamNG GmbH	BeamNG GmbH	Vehicle simulation	Microsoft Windows	29 May 2015
Beasts and Bumpkins	Worldweaver Ltd	Electronic Arts	Real-time simulation	Microsoft Windows	1997
Betrayal at Krondor	Dynamix	Dynamix, Activision, Sierra Entertainment	RPG	MS-DOS, Microsoft Windows	22 June 1993
Beyond Divinity	Larian Studios	HIP Interactive, Ubisoft, Focus Home Interactive	RPG	Microsoft Windows	2004
Beyond Good & Evil	Ubisoft Pictures, Ubisoft Milan	Ubisoft	Action-adventure	Microsoft Windows	11 November 2003
Big Rigs: Over the Road Racing	Stellar Stone	GameMill Publishing	Racing Game	Microsoft Windows	20 November 2003
Billy the Wizard: Rocket Broomstick Racing	Data Design Interactive	Metro3D Europe	Racing, platform	Microsoft Windows	8 September 2011
The Binding of Isaac	Edmund McMillen	Florian Himsl, Edmund McMillen	Roguelike	Microsoft Windows, macOS, Linux	7 May 2014
BioShock	2K Boston, 2K Australia	2K Games	First-person shooter	Microsoft Windows, macOS	21 August 2007
BioShock 2	2K Marin	2K Games	First-person shooter	Microsoft Windows, macOS	9 February 2010
BioShock Infinite	Irrational Games	2K Games	First-person shooter	Microsoft Windows, macOS, Linux	26 March 2013
Black Mesa	Crowbar Collective	Crowbar Collective	First-person shooter	Microsoft Windows, Linux	5 May 2015
Black Skylands	Hungry Couch Games	tinyBuild	Top-down shooter, Open world	Microsoft Windows	12 July 2021
Blade Kitten	Krome Studios	Atari	Action-platform	Microsoft Windows	22 September 2010
Blade Strangers	Studio Saizensen	Nicalis	Fighting	Microsoft Windows	28 August 2018
Blade Symphony	Puny Human	Puny Human Games	Action	Microsoft Windows	7 May 2014
Blades of Time	Gaijin Entertainment	Gaijin Entertainment	Hack and slash, platformer, action-adventure	Microsoft Windows, macOS	6 March 2012
Blitzkrieg	Nival Interactive	CDV, 1C Company, Virtual Programming	Real-time tactics	Microsoft Windows, macOS	4 June 2003
Borderlands	Gearbox Software	2K Games	Action role-playing, first-person shooter	Microsoft Windows	20 October 2009
Borderlands 2	Gearbox Software, Iron Galaxy Studios	2K Games	Action role-playing, first-person shooter	Microsoft Windows, Linux, macOS	18 September 2012
Borderlands 3	Gearbox Software	2K Games	Action role-playing, first-person shooter	Microsoft Windows	13 September 2019
Borderlands 4	Gearbox Software	2K Games	Action role-playing, first-person shooter	Microsoft Windows	23 September 2025
Borderlands: The Pre-Sequel!	Gearbox Software, 2K Australia	2K Games	Action role-playing, first-person shooter	Microsoft Windows, Linux, macOS	14 October 2014
Braid	Number None	Number None	Puzzle, platform	Microsoft Windows, Linux, macOS	10 April 2009
Bratz: Flaunt Your Fashion	Petoons Studio	Outright Games	Action, adventure	Windows 10 64-Bit	4 November 2022
Brawlhalla	Blue Mammoth Games	Ubisoft	Fighting	Microsoft Windows, macOS	17 October 2017
Bridge Project	Halycon Media GmbH & Co. KG	BitComposer Games	Simulation	Microsoft Windows, macOS	28 March 2013
Brothers in Arms: Earned in Blood	Gearbox Software	Ubisoft	First-person shooter	Microsoft Windows, OS X	4 October 2005
Brothers in Arms: Hell's Highway	Gearbox Software	Ubisoft	First-person shooter	Microsoft Windows	23 September 2008
Brothers in Arms: Road to Hill 30	Gearbox Software	Ubisoft	First-person shooter	Microsoft Windows, Mac OS X	15 February 2005
Bulletstorm	People Can Fly, Epic Games	Electronic Arts	First-person shooter	Microsoft Windows	22 February 2011
Burnout Paradise: The Ultimate Box	Criterion Games	Electronic Arts	Racing	Microsoft Windows	3 February 2009
Bus Simulator	Stillalive Studios	Astragon	Simulator	Windows 10 64-Bit, Mac OS X	7 September 2021
Bum Ball Bears	Goofish Game Studios	Goofish Game Studios	Sports	Windows 10	14 August 2023
