= Thousand Parsec =

Turn-based science fiction 4X game engine

- Original authors: Tim Ansell, Lee Begg
- Developer: Community
- Initial release: January 2002; 23 years ago
- Final release: 0.7 / 18 April 2010; 15 years ago
- Repository: https://github.com/thousandparsec
- Written in: C++, Python
- Platform: Cross-platform
- Type: Single-player, multiplayer 4X, Turn-based strategy
- License: GPLv2
- Website: Official website (archived)

Thousand Parsec (TP) is a free and open source project with the goal of creating a framework for turn-based space empire building games.

Thousand Parsec is a framework for creating a specific group of games, which are often called 4X games, from the main phases of gameplay that arise: eXplore, eXpand, eXploit and eXterminate. Some examples of games from which Thousand Parsec draws ideas are Reach for the Stars, Stars!, VGA Planets, Master of Orion and Galactic Civilizations.

Unlike commercial alternatives, it is designed for long games supporting universes as large as the player's computer can handle. It allows a high degree of player customization, and features a flexible technology system, where new technologies may be introduced mid-game.

== History ==
Development of the project (under a different name) was started in January 2002 by Tim Ansell. Originally it was going to be a simple clone of Stars!. Later, Tim decided to try starting a full open source project to become the "Worldforge" of space empire games. He hoped that this would encourage other people who didn't want to just clone Stars! to help out with the project and give it a broader appeal. After the announcement of the project Lee Begg was the only person who joined it. Lee remained the only other major contributor until early 2007.

By the year 2006 Thousand Parsec had not reached the envisioned goals. Partly the problem had been in the underestimation of the amount of work needed and partly because the project did not initially attract any new developers. Despite these setbacks, Thousand Parsec has a huge code base of framework; according to the Ohloh project stats, the project has produced 95,000 lines of code, while Thousand Parsec's own code count puts it at 90,000. The number of features left before full games of the complexity of Stars! can be produced is extremely small. According to the software analysis website Ohloh the project has had 47 individual contributors.

Progress since late 2006 and early 2007 has been increasing rapidly with a number of new developers joining the project. The project also went on a recruitment drive by running an AI programming competition and active promotion during linux.conf.au.

In 2007 Thousand Parsec was allocated 3 slots in the 2007 Google Summer of Code.

In 2008 Thousand Parsec was fortunate enough to be allocated 8 slots for Google Summer of Code. Projects include three new rulesets, a 3D client, three AI-related projects, and a project to extend the server and create a single-player mode.

In 2009 Thousand Parsec again participated in the Google Summer of Code, being given 7 slots.

Thousand Parsec has had significant success in developing students into full-fledged contributors;

Local developer Eugene Tan, who last year contributed code to the Thousand Parsec project--an open source framework computer game--was invited by the project's lead developer to mentor this year's participants for the project. Tan told ZDNet Asia: "Returning as a mentor is important to me because this is in keeping with the spirit of the open source community, where I am sharing my knowledge and contributing my expertise to collaborate with other programmers to develop better, more innovative applications."

In August 2010, the project migrated its code repository from SourceForge to GitHub. In 2012 the project announced itself as discontinued and recommended instead FreeOrion.

== Reception ==
The game was described in-detail in the 2012 book "The Architecture of Open Source Applications".
