= Star King (disambiguation) =

Star King is a science fiction novel written by Jack Vance.

Star King may also refer to:

- Star King (TV series), a South Korean series which aired from 2007 to 2016
- The Star Kings, a 1949 Edmond Hamilton science fiction novel
- Star Kingdom (1946–1967), a Thoroughbred race horse formerly known as Star King

== See also ==
- Star-King, a 1991 video game
- Thomas Starr King (1824 – 1864), known as Starr King, American Universalist and Unitarian minister
