= Battleground 8: Prelude to Waterloo =

1997 wargame video game

- Developer: TalonSoft
- Publisher: TalonSoft
- Platform: Windows
- Release: September 1997
- Genre: Computer wargame
- Modes: Single-player, multiplayer

Battleground 8: Prelude to Waterloo is a 1997 computer wargame developed and published by TalonSoft. It is the eighth entry in the Battleground series.

== Gameplay ==
Battleground 8: Prelude to Waterloo is a computer wargame that simulates military conflict during the Napoleonic Wars.

== Development ==
Battleground 8: Prelude to Waterloo is the eighth game in the Battleground series. It was developed and published by TalonSoft, and was originally planned as an expansion pack for Battleground 3: Waterloo. Scott Udell of Computer Games Strategy Plus reported that "the popularity of that game and the demand for more Napoleonic coverage [led] TalonSoft ... to flush it out into a full release." It was announced in November 1996 as one of the next two titles in the Battleground series, alongside Battleground 7: Bull Run. Prelude to Waterloo shipped to retailers on September 15, 1997. At the time, TalonSoft announced it as the final game in the Battleground series.

== Reception ==
Reception

Review scores
Publication	Score
Computer Games Strategy Plus	5/5
Computer Gaming World	4/5
GameSpot	5.5/10
CNET Gamecenter	8/10

Mark McIntosh of Computer Games Strategy Plus gave Prelude to Waterloo a rave review, calling it "without a doubt the best game TalonSoft has produced" in the Battleground series. Computer Gaming World's Bob Proctor was also positive: he dubbed it "a very good game" despite the presence of "more than a few" small flaws.

== Legacy ==
Although Prelude to Waterloo was announced as the final game in the Battleground series, it received a sequel in 1999, under the title Battleground 9: Chickamauga.
