= Godzilla: Kaijuu no Daishingeki =

1995 video game

- Publisher: Sega
- Series: Godzilla
- Platform: Game Gear
- Release: JP: December 8, 1995
- Genre: Strategy
- Mode: Single-player

Godzilla: Kaijuu no Daishingeki (Note: Japanese: ゴジラ 怪獣大進撃, Hepburn: lit. 'Godzilla: Giant Monster March') is a turn-based strategy video game published by Sega. It was released in 1995 for the Game Gear.

== Gameplay ==
Godzilla: Kaijuu no Daishingeki is a turn-based strategy game based on the Godzilla film series. In the game, players choose to control either the Earth Defense Force or the Godzilla Army. There are five levels in total. In these levels, the objectives is to defeat the opposing side or to completely eliminate the uncontrollable "Space Monsters."

== Release and reception ==
Reception

Review score
Publication	Score
Famitsu	7/10, 5/10, 6/10, 6/10

Godzilla: Kaijuu no Daishingeki was released in Japan for the Game Gear on December 8, 1995. Following its release, Sega would be the publisher for a number of other Godzilla video games such as Godzilla Rettoushinkan (1995) and Godzilla Generations (1998).

Two reviewers in Famitsu suggested playing as the Earth Defense Force as it was both more challenging and ultimately more rewarding. While one reviewer found the game well organized for small scale visuals on the Game Gear, they found elements such as the Monster Encyclopedia to be lacking. Another reviewer in the magazine found the game lacked a lot of user-friendly options, such knowing how far a missile will go across the map until it is launched.

== See also ==
- List of Game Gear games
- List of turn-based strategy video games
