= Tribal Rage =

1998 video game

- Developer: Disintegrator
- Publisher: TalonSoft
- Platform: Microsoft Windows
- Release: June 9, 1998
- Genre: Real-Time strategy
- Modes: Single-player, multiplayer

Tribal Rage is a real-time strategy game developed by Disintegrator for Microsoft Windows, released in 1998. It was published by TalonSoft in the USA and by Empire Interactive in Europe. The game was met with low to mediocre reviews.

== Plot ==
The game is set in California, Earth in the year 2030. War, famine and plague have forced the populace into six different tribes, each fighting for control of the post-apocalyptic wastelands that remain.

== Gameplay ==
The game features six playable tribes:

- Bikers
- Cyborgs
- Enforcers
- Amazons
- Death Cultists
- Trailer Trash

It is also possible for the player to design their own warriors, scenarios and vehicles using the in-game editor.

Like many RTS games, players use the mouse to play and interact with the game. Keyboard hotkeys can also be used to aid in performing actions. Players must construct their base and collect resources in order to fund the creation of units, which are then used in battle. The object of the game is to defeat the opposition by destroying their base and units.

== See also ==
- KKND
- KKND2: Krossfire
- Command & Conquer
