= Second Conflict =

1991 video game

- Publisher: jSOFT
- Release: 1991

Second Conflict is a 1991 video game published by jSOFT.

== Gameplay ==
Second Conflict is a game in which strategy is part of interstellar conquest for up to ten human and computer players. Players can use a variety of different spaceship types, and the game comes with six scenarios as well as a Do It Yourself option.

== Reception ==
Dana L. Cadman reviewed the game for Computer Gaming World, and stated that "Second Conflict is easy to learn, as there are few rules to contend with. In addition, the game runs under Windows 3.0, so it is very mouse-oriented and easy to use. Moving fleets, attacking and changing production are all handled through the menus and icons. ... Second Conflict is a great game for those who abhor complex rules or enjoy games with short turns. For those who like to define the arena for a battle by changing the victory conditions to fit one's mood. Second Conflict is a must. And remember, there is no such thing as a benevolent Empire."

The Italian magazine Videogame & Computer World approved of the graphics and found that working in a Windows environment made the game easier and faster to play, and also complimented the manual.
