= The Banished Vault =

- Developer: Lunar Division
- Publisher: Bithell Games
- Designer: Nic Tringali
- Engine: Unity
- Platforms: macOS; Windows
- Release: WW: July 25, 2023
- Genre: Turn-based strategy
- Mode: Single-player

The Banished Vault is a 2023 turn-based strategy video game developed by Lunar Division and published by Bithell Games. Players must engage in careful resource management as they explore the galaxy in a spaceship chased by a powerful entity.

== Gameplay ==
Players control a monastery traveling through space. The Banished Vault is a turn-based strategy game with survival mechanics. As the monks explore solar systems, players must manage the crew and their ship, maintain the faith of the monks, and gather resources. Players can build structures to refine resources into materials necessary for spaceflight, such as fuel. Some planets may lack important resources and require imports before players can build fuel refineries. The monks' goal is to find four special planets where they can build a unique structure to record their efforts. Players must carefully plan their actions to avoid running out of resources or taking too many turns. An in-game calculator is available to assist players. If they use up too many resources, they may become stranded. If they spend too long in a single solar system, they may be caught by the Gloom, a malicious entity that is chasing them. It is played from an isometric point of view, and the map is procedurally generated.

== Development ==
The game was created by Chicago-based developer Nic Tringali under the name Lunar Division, a label of Bithell Games used for "experimental ideas and for projects helmed by new directors". The Banished Vault for macOS and Windows on July 25, 2023. A physical manual is available for purchase.

== Reception ==
Despite saying he enjoys logistical puzzles, PC Gamer's reviewer called it "really bloody arduous" and compared it to doing math homework. Polygon said it is "a master class in the economy and cruelty of space survival". Commenting on its difficulty, Polygon's reviewer said it is "the most grueling thing I've played in years, and I love it", and Paste said "I'm loving every horrible minute" of their crew's travails. Destructoid found the necessary micromanagement stressful, uninteresting, and unsatisfying.
