= Buku Sudoku =

2006 video game

- Developer: Absolutist
- Publisher: Merscom
- Platforms: Windows, Xbox 360
- Release: Windows; 2006; Xbox 360; May 28, 2008
- Genre: Puzzle
- Modes: Single-player, multiplayer

Buku Sudoku (titled Buku Números in Mexico and Buku数字パズル in Japan) is a downloadable puzzle game developed by Ukrainian studio Absolutist Ltd and published by Merscom based on Sudoku for the Windows PC's. The game was also released for the Xbox 360 via Xbox Live Arcade, on May 28, 2008.

== Gameplay ==
Xbox 360 (XBLA) version.

Buku Sudoku 360 offers variations on the traditional Sudoku puzzle including 4x4, 6x6, 8x8, 9x9, 12x12 and 16x16 grids. There are also three difficulty levels featured, as well as a "Create Your Own Sudoku" feature. The game allows the player customization options by letting them choose different background and tile themes to modify their Sudoku board. The Windows version features a Puzzle Mode and timed Arcade Mode, while the Xbox 360 version promises co-op and competitive online play. The game also features a display hints option for gamers that like to know when they have mis-entered a number. If a player answers a set correctly (rows, columns, boxes and numbers in boxes), then the choices become permanent. The game has 1200 Sudoku puzzles to play.

== Downloadable content ==
The Xbox Live Arcade version of Buku Sudoku will feature downloadable content packs.

== Reception ==
Reception

Aggregate scores
Aggregator	Score
GameRankings	X360: 58.53%
Metacritic	X360: 60/100

Review scores
Publication	Score
Eurogamer	8/10
GamePro	4/5
GameZone	5.8/10
IGN	6/10
TeamXbox	6/10
Gameplanet	6/10

Buku Sudoku received mixed reviews upon the game's release on the Xbox 360. On Metacritic, the game holds a score of 60/100 for the Xbox 360 version based on 19 reviews. On GameRankings, the game holds a score of 58.53% for the Xbox 360 version based on 17 reviews.

== See also ==
- Sudoku
