= Battleground 5: Antietam =

1996 video game

- Developer: TalonSoft
- Publisher: TalonSoft
- Series: Battleground
- Platform: Microsoft Windows
- Release: NA: November 1, 1996
- Genre: Computer wargame
- Modes: Single-player, multiplayer

Battleground 5: Antietam is a 1996 computer wargame developed by TalonSoft in 1996, the fifth issue in the popular Battleground series.

== Gameplay ==
It simulated combat at the 1862 Battle of Antietam and the earlier Battle of South Mountain during the American Civil War's Maryland Campaign, using both a video version of miniature wargaming and board gaming. Terrain hex maps are 3D or 2D with various scales and sizes.

The basic platform for the Battleground series involves individual infantry and cavalry regiments, artillery batteries, and commanders. All are rated for strength, firepower, weaponry, morale, and movement. As a unit takes fire, it may become fatigued, disordered, or routed to the rear. Players compete against the computer's artificial intelligence or against another player via modem. Players may try a variety of individual scenarios, or refight the entire battle of Antietam. A Fog of War option enhances playing against the computer, as it hides units that are not in direct view of the enemy.

The game features video clips of battle reenactments, as well as Civil War music by folk singer Bobby Horton.

== Reception ==
Reception

Review scores
Publication	Score
Computer Games Strategy Plus	4.5/5
CNET Gamecenter	4/5

The three Battleground games of 1996—Shiloh, Antietam and Waterloo—collectively won Computer Games Strategy Plus's wargame of the year award for that year.

Waterloo and Antietam were runners-up for Computer Game Entertainment's 1996 "Best War Game" prize, which ultimately went to Tigers on the Prowl 2. The magazine's editors called both games "top-notch", and summarized Antietam as "the best iteration yet of TalonSoft's successful Civil War game system."
