= Disciples: Sacred Lands =

1999 video game

- Developer: Strategy First
- Publisher: GT Interactive
- Director: Stéphane Rainville
- Producer: Prokopios Sotos
- Designer: Danny Bélanger
- Programmer: Dominic Mathieu
- Artist: Benoit Carrière
- Composer: Sébastien Thifault
- Platform: Windows
- Release: NA: September 30, 1999
- Genre: Turn-based strategy
- Modes: Single-player, multiplayer

Disciples: Sacred Lands is a turn-based strategy game published by Strategy First in 1999. Set in a fantasy world known as the Sacred Lands, it depicts a battle for dominance between the races of the world of Nevendaar. In 2001, an expanded version of the game was released titled Disciples: Sacred Lands - Gold Edition, which added 25 new scenarios.

== Gameplay ==
The gameplay is similar to other turn-based strategy games of the era, such as Heroes of Might and Magic and Warlords, and consists of three major components: The capital city, where the player recruits units, constructs buildings, and researches spells; the adventure map, where the player leads heroes and their parties to explore the land; and the battle screen, where battles are fought whenever hostile parties meet on the adventure map.

The player can choose one of four different races — the Empire (humans), the Mountain Clans (dwarves), the Legions of the Damned (demons), and the Undead Hordes (undead) — each of which has a different play style and a unique story campaign. The player also selects from three overlord professions with unique skills and abilities. Each race has unique army units to recruit, and the units can be upgraded by constructing buildings at the player's capital city and gaining experience points from battling foes or wandering monster parties.

Combat is turn-based, with individual units' speed stat determining what order they will act in. While on the adventure map, the player can move units around and assign them to either the front row or the back row, although while in combat the units cannot be moved. Each unit has a different style of attacking. Some units have a melee attack that targets a single enemy unit in the front row, some units have a ranged attack that targets a single enemy unit anywhere, and some units attack with magic spells that targets all enemy units at once.

The game can be played in single-player, hotseat multi-player on the same computer, or online multi-player modes.

== Reception ==
Reception

Aggregate score
Aggregator	Score
GameRankings	82%

Review scores
Publication	Score
CNET Gamecenter	7/10
Computer Games Strategy Plus	3.5/5
Computer Gaming World	1.5/5
EP Daily	7/10
GamePro	4/5
GameSpot	8.3/10
GameZone	5.2/10
IGN	8.5/10
Jeuxvideo.com	13/20
PC Gamer (US)	89%

The game received "favorable" reviews according to the review aggregation website GameRankings, and Computer Games Magazine said it received "mostly positive reviews" upon release. However, publisher Strategy First was disappointed with its initial performance, prompting them to release a special "gold edition" of the game in 2001.

GameSpot's associate editor Andrew Park called the game "the most pleasant surprise of 1999." He stated he was initially unimpressed with the game, regarding it as a "watered-down clone" of Heroes of Might and Magic III, and was particularly critical of its "washed out" colors and "tiny sprites." But upon playing a session of the game, he reversed his opinion of it, now praising its "exquisite hand-painted portraits" and "subdued colors" as well as the sound quality of the voice clips.

GameSpot awarded the game "Best Game No One Played" at their Best & Worst of 1999 Awards, and nominated it for the "Best Graphics, Artistic Design" award, although it lost to Rayman 2: The Great Escape.

== Sequels ==
Four sequels have been released: Disciples II: Dark Prophecy in 2002, Disciples III: Renaissance in 2009, Disciples: Liberation in 2021, and Disciples: Domination in 2026.
