= Disciples II: Dark Prophecy =

2002 video game

- Developer: Strategy First
- Publishers: NA: Strategy First; EU: Arxel Tribe; AU: Eidos Interactive
- Director: Danny Bélanger
- Producer: Prokopios Sotos
- Designer: Danny Bélanger
- Programmer: Frédéric Ferland
- Artist: Patrick Lambert
- Composer: Philippe Charron
- Platform: Windows
- Release: NA: January 24, 2002 (Note: The Collector's Edition was released on January 22, 2002.); AU: April 5, 2002; UK: September 13, 2002; Guardians of the Light: NA: June 14, 2003; Servants of the Dark: NA: July 15, 2003; Rise of the Elves: NA: November 24, 2003; Gallean's Return: NA: May 27, 2005
- Genre: Turn-based strategy
- Modes: Single-player, multiplayer

Disciples II: Dark Prophecy is a 2002 turn-based strategy game by Strategy First for Microsoft Windows. It is the sequel to the 1999 game Disciples: Sacred Lands, and has become significantly more successful in terms of both sales and popularity than its predecessor. A collector's edition version of the game was released, which included a card game based upon the story and five extra quests.

Three expansion packs were released: Guardians of the Light, Servants of the Dark, and Rise of the Elves. Two compilation editions followed: Disciples 2: Gallean's Return contains the base game plus Guardians of the Light and Servants of the Dark, while Disciples II: Rise of the Elves combines the base game with Rise of the Elves and an additional campaign.

Developed by Linux Game Publishing, a port for Linux was in development between 2002 and 2003 before going unreleased. A port of Disciples II for the Nintendo DS was in development, but not released. A sequel named Disciples III: Renaissance was released in 2009.

== Gameplay ==
Disciples II is a fantasy strategy game, set in a fictional kingdom called Nevendaar (also referred to as 'The Sacred Lands'). The main focus of the story revolves around four dominant races in a state of almost constant war. These four factions are the human Empire, the dwarven Mountain Clans, the demonic Legions of the Damned, and the skeletal Undead Hordes. There are also several other 'neutral' races such as Merfolk, Greenskins and Elves (the Elves became a full-fledged playable race with the addition of the expansion pack 'Rise of the Elves').

The gameplay is divided into three main parts; building up the Capital City of your race so that you can research new Warriors and spells, and building up new armies (this involves careful resource management); using heroes (leading small squads) to explore the surroundings, procure resources and attack the enemy; and finally the battles themselves.

Each playable race's Capital City is protected by an extremely powerful guardian, who is nearly impossible to defeat except with a very strong hero. The Capital City is the only city capable of building structures. Other cities may only upgrade themselves to allow them to mount larger defense forces.

Battles consist of confrontations between a hero's squad (which can take up to five other Warriors, bearing in mind that some large creatures such as dragons take up the space of two units) and an enemy squad. High praise is given to the excellent graphics and animations in these battles. At the end of the battle, the winning side receives experience points. All surviving units receive the same amount of XP. If sufficient XP is accumulated by a unit, it may then upgrade to another, determined by the type of structures in the Capital. If no next-level structures have been built, the unit does not level up and does not receive any more experience until the structure is built. The only exception is if the unit is at the end of the "upgrade tree", in which case it will remain the same unit but gain small increases to health, attack damage, and accuracy stats.

At the beginning of a campaign, the player may select his or her class (warrior, mage, or guildmaster). Each class has advantages and disadvantages. For example, a mage player may cast the same spell twice in a single turn, while a guildmaster has the ability to carry out more types of spying/assassination assignments. Besides player classes, the game also features five types of heroes (or leaders): Warrior, Mage, Ranger, Rod Bearer, and Thief. The first three differ only slightly, as they are all combat leaders. The Rod Bearers are the only leaders capable of claiming resources on the map. Thieves may perform special actions on enemy armies and cities.

Spellcasting may only be done outside of battles and requires the use of mana to both research and cast a spell. There are four types of mana (life, runic, death, and infernal) with the fifth type (grove) added for the Rise of the Elves expansion. Each race's spells are mainly reliant on their corresponding mana type (e.g. Empire -> life mana), although other mana types are required for higher-level spells. Grove mana is only required for Elven spells. Only one spell may be researched per turn, and a spell may only be cast once per turn (twice if the player is a mage class). Also, a mage player researches spells at half the normal cost.

During the single-player campaigns, the player may transfer one leader and five artifacts (including potions and one-shot spells) to the next level. At the end of a campaign, an option is given to save the player's top leader in a file for use in custom or multiplayer games.

== Reception ==
=== Dark Prophecy ===
Disciples II: Dark Prophecy

Aggregate score
Aggregator	Score
Metacritic	84/100

Review scores
Publication	Score
Computer Gaming World	4/5
GameSpot	8.4/10
GameSpy	87%
GameZone	8.8/10
IGN	8.6/10
PC Gamer (US)	82%
PC Zone	75%
X-Play	4/5

The game received "favorable" reviews according to the review aggregation website Metacritic. It was a nominee for GameSpot's annual "Best Graphics (Artistic) on PC" and "Best Game No One Played on PC" awards.

== Expansion packs ==
=== Guardians of the Light ===
Disciples II: Guardians of the Light

Aggregate score
Aggregator	Score
Metacritic	72/100

Review scores
Publication	Score
Computer Gaming World	3.5/5
GameSpot	7/10
GameSpy	2/5
GameZone	8.4/10
IGN	7/10
PC Gamer (US)	78%

The Guardians of the Light expansion pack received "average" reviews according to Metacritic.

=== Servants of the Dark ===
Disciples II: Servants of the Dark

Aggregate score
Aggregator	Score
Metacritic	65/100

Review scores
Publication	Score
Computer Gaming World	3.5/5
GameSpot	7/10
GameSpy	2/5
GameZone	7/10
IGN	7/10

The Servants of the Dark expansion pack received more "mixed" reviews than the first two games according to Metacritic.

=== Rise of the Elves ===
Disciples II: Rise of the Elves

Aggregate score
Aggregator	Score
Metacritic	80/100

Review scores
Publication	Score
GameSpot	7.6/10
GameSpy	4/5
GameZone	8.8/10
IGN	7.9/10
X-Play	3/5

The Rise of the Elves add-on received "favorable" reviews according to Metacritic.

=== Gold Edition ===
Disciples II: Gold Edition

Aggregate score
Aggregator	Score
GameRankings	78%

Review scores
Publication	Score
GameZone	8.5/10
PC Format	61%
PC Zone	70%

The Gold Edition received "favorable" reviews according to the review aggregation website GameRankings.
