= Beyond Flesh and Blood =

2016 video game

- Developer: Pixelbomb Games
- Publisher: Sold Out
- Engine: Unreal Engine 4
- Platform: Microsoft Windows
- Release: 1 June 2016
- Genre: Third-person shooter

Beyond Flesh and Blood is a third-person shooter video game developed by British independent video game development company Pixelbomb Games and published by Sold Out for Microsoft Windows.

== Gameplay ==
Beyond Flesh and Blood is a third-person shooter set 265 years in the future in a post-apocalyptic Manchester. Players control large mechs and play as a silent protagonist. There are four different mechs in total, each with different weapons, movement style, and grade. During gameplay, the player respawns with a new mech upon death.

== Development ==
The game was developed by Pixelbomb Games, an independent studio based in Manchester. The game uses Unreal Engine 4.

In a preview of the game, Rock, Paper, Shotgun's Alice O'Connor wrote: "I'll surely be disappointed if I visit Manchester and there aren't any mechs, but the same's true for every city." The Manchester Evening News called the game's setting, "Manchester as you've never seen it before". questioned the violence and the setting of the game, asking readers "Do you think it's appropriate to use Manchester as the setting for a violent game?". 94% of responders voted, "Yes, it's just pretend".
