= Battleground: Ardennes =

1995 video game

- Developer: TalonSoft
- Publisher: TalonSoft
- Platform: Windows
- Release: November 25, 1995
- Genre: Computer wargame
- Modes: Single player, multiplayer

Battleground: Ardennes is a 1995 computer wargame developed and published by TalonSoft. It the first game in the Battleground series

== Development ==
Battleground was the first game released by TalonSoft. It was made on the company's Battleview engine, designed to be reused in subsequent games. Battleground was designed by Jim Rose and John Tiller, the latter of whom was "destined to become one of the most prolific and respected designers in all Grognardia", according to Rock, Paper, Shotgun.

== Reception ==
Reception

Review scores
Publication	Score
Computer Gaming World	3/5
PC Gamer (US)	91%
Computer Game Review	86/83/86

Battleground: Ardennes was commercially successful. Terry Coleman of Computer Gaming World noted that it was "rare that a new wargame company makes much of a splash in terms of units sold, but TalonSoft is off to a solid start with this title." In 1998, Computer Gaming World dubbed Battleground "the most successful wargame series".

In PC Gamer US, William R. Trotter called Battleground: Ardennes "a most auspicious debut", and noted that he "eagerly await[ed] future releases in the Battleground Series." PC Gamer US later nominated Ardennes for its 1995 "Best Wargame" award, which ultimately went to Steel Panthers.

== Legacy ==
Battleground: Ardennes was the first game in Battleground series. PC Gamer US's William R. Trotter argued in 1996 that Battleground and its sequels had "single-handedly rejuvenated the hex-grid system, combining it with thrilling miniatures-style graphics and beautiful video."
