= Black the Fall =

2017 video game

- Developer: Sand Sailor Studio
- Publisher: Square Enix
- Platforms: Windows; PlayStation 4 Xbox One; Nintendo Switch
- Release: Windows: WW: July 4, 2017; PS4, Xbox One: WW: July 11, 2017; Switch: NA: December 14, 2017; EU: January 9, 2018
- Genre: Puzzle-platform
- Mode: Single-player

Black the Fall (stylized as BLAƆK THE FALL) is a puzzle-platform video game developed by Sand Sailor Studio and published by Square Enix for Microsoft Windows, PlayStation 4, Xbox One, and Nintendo Switch. The player controls a machinist in a dystopic world inspired by the Romanian Revolution, solving environmental puzzles and avoiding death.

== Gameplay ==
Black the Fall is a puzzle platformer. The player character is an unnamed machinist who escapes a surreal and mostly monochromatic environment presented as a 2.5D platform game. The player controls the machinist who walks, climbs, and uses objects to overcome obstacles and progress in the game. The machinist gains the ability to mind control other workers and later a robot to complete certain puzzles.

The machinist can die in various ways, such as being shot with machineguns, ensnared by guards, crushed by machines, burned by fire or drowned.

== Plot ==
In a dystopic communist Romania, a machinist goes to work pedaling a bicycle to power a machine. He decides to escape the large factory where he encounters a TV filming propaganda, groups of people cheering on a speech of Nicolae Ceaușescu, and a depot with armored two-legged mechas used for repression.

The machinist makes it outside, a wasteland where all trees are dead and soil is polluted by heavy factories. Here he finds a robot used to complete puzzles. After passing by an abandoned theme park the machinist goes through a wall to a destroyed city where people are still praying in a church soon to be demolished. He finds and takes an overcrowded bus, but is soon arrested and taken to prison.

After escaping his cell, the now injured machinist wanders through an abandoned prison. He hides in a mass grave to avoid capture before making it outside, where a revolution is taking place with people fighting against the government. The machinist uses a semi-broken mecha to open a hole in the city wall. The game ends with the machinist walking in front of images of the Romanian Revolution.

== Release ==
The game was released on Steam's early access in 2014. It also had a Kickstarter campaign in 2014.

== Reception ==
Reception

Aggregate score
Aggregator	Score
Metacritic	PC: 72/100; PS4: 66/100; XONE: 68/100; NS: 68/100

Review scores
Publication	Score
Edge	7/10
Game Informer	6/10
IGN	6.5/10
VideoGamer.com	5/10

On Metacritic the game received "mixed or average" reviews, according.
