= Stars! =

1995 video game

- Developers: Jeff Johnson and Jeff McBride
- Publisher: Empire Interactive
- Platform: Microsoft Windows
- Release: November 20, 1995 (shareware); February 4, 1997 (full)
- Genres: 4X, Turn-based strategy
- Modes: Single-player, PBEM

Stars! is a turn-based strategy, science fiction 4X video game (eXplore, eXpand, eXploit, eXterminate), originally developed by Jeff Johnson and Jeff McBride with help from Jeffrey Krauss ("the Jeffs") for personal use, initially released as shareware for Microsoft Windows in 1995. A retail version was later produced and published by Empire Interactive, with developer Jason Gaston added to the team for quality assurance testing, although the shareware version continued.

The game focuses on players developing their empires, engaging in diplomacy, and conquering the galaxy. It begins with race design, and features 2D graphics and a grid-based battle system. The game is well-adapted to Play-By-Email and also supports AI opponents, blitz games, and duels. Stars! is compatible with most Windows versions and can run on Linux systems through Wine. While it received generally positive reviews for its depth and multiplayer focus, its complexity and single-player appeal were criticized. A sequel, Stars: Supernova Genesis, was abandoned due to lack of publisher interest.

== Gameplay ==
Starting with a small fleet of ships and one or two planets, players develop their empires, meet other races and conquer the galaxy. Stars! games begin with race design, choosing one of 10 primary racial traits, a selection of lesser racial traits, habitability, growth, economic, and technology settings. The graphics are entirely 2D, and consist of the main map view and static pictures of planets, ship hulls and components. Battles consist of moving static icons around a grid. Because of the high level of micromanagement and diplomacy requirements, many games take place over months between players spread across the galaxy.

Players initially send scouts out to scan for suitable planets which later may be colonized and developed, enlarging the player's empire and providing additional resources. As a player's empire expands, the player must balance the management of the population, minerals, research, and ship/infrastructure constructions. When other players' races are encountered, a variety of diplomacy options allow for alliances, trading mineral resources or technology, large-scale wars, and even the destruction of other races. If the random events game option is enabled, players will have to contend with (or take advantage of) the Mystery Trader, comet strikes, wormholes, and environmental changes.

=== Modes of play ===
The game is well adapted to the play-by-email (PBEM) style of multiplayer gaming. One player takes on duties as host, and the other players will send their instructions (turn files) by email to the host. The host then uses their copy of the game to generate the next turn, including the players' instructions and emails back the new game state file.

An alternative to play-by-email is to use an online system such as the Stars! AutoHost. This system automates most of the hosting duties and can handle a large number of games simultaneously.

Many games are run at a rate of one turn per calendar day, giving plenty of time for strategic thinking. In large games, this can be necessary, with turn generation dropping to only three times per week in some cases due to the complexity of the game and the level of micromanagement required to effectively control a large empire competitively. To foster a better understanding of the game, Mare Crisium paid members of the player community (Kearns, Clifford, Steeves) to write and edit an in-depth Strategy Guide in 1998.

There is also an artificial intelligence (AI) that can take part in the game. The player can choose to play against AIs only (up to 15 of them), and this is the way that new players typically get to learn the game mechanics before launching into multiplayer games. A tutorial helps with getting started.

Another style of play is referred to as a Blitz game. In these games, turns are played every 15 minutes or so, and all players must be at their computers at the same time. Blitz games are generally more tactical and less political in nature, due to the time constraints involved.

The duel games are similar to regular turn-a-day ones, but are between two players only. Again, with only two players involved there is no political side to these games.

== Compatibility ==
Stars! can be run on most versions of Windows from Windows 3.1 up. It can even be run on Linux systems through the Wine system. However, under Wine, version 2.70 crashes during combat if combat sounds are enabled. Stars! does not run directly on the 64-bit version of Windows XP, Windows Vista or Windows 7, which cannot run 16-bit software. However, it can be played on a virtual machine-like Virtual Windows XP on Windows 7, or in VirtualPC on earlier 32-bit versions of Windows. Another alternative is VirtualBox. It also runs quite well using Windows 3.11 installed in DOSBox. The preview version (32bit) of Windows 10 plays version 2.60i. On 64-bit Windows 10, version 2.70i runs well on Wine for Windows version otvdm-v0.7.0.

== Development ==
The game was originally developed in 1995, with version 2.0 released early in 1996. Later that year the newsgroup rec.games.computer.stars became active, facilitating public discussion of tactics and allowing players to find new games.

The game was originally developed by Jeff Johnson and Jeff McBride with help from Jeffrey Krauss ("the Jeffs") for personal use, initially released as shareware for Microsoft Windows in 1995. A retail version was later produced for, and published by Empire Interactive, with developer Jason Gaston added to the team for quality assurance testing, although the shareware version continued.

By the end of 1996 shareware version 2.60 had been released, and the game has remained essentially unchanged ever since, although there have been numerous updates. Version 2.70 is the retail version which has battle sounds and allows research past level ten (the shareware version is restricted). The latest file date on the retail version CD-ROM is January 8, 1997; it sold for $41 before tax at Media Play in the southeastern U.S. in February 1997. The manual was 15mm thick (over half an inch), but the game only needed 2 MB of installation space. The most recent patch version, 2.60j RC4 (release candidate 4) was released in December 2000. Versions 2.60 and 2.70 are compatible as long as the minor version letter is the same (e.g.: 2.60i can play with 2.70i players). Over the years a number of third-party developers have provided tools and utilities to help players manage their empires.

== Reception ==
Reception

Review score
Publication	Score
Computer Game Review	80/93/89

Stars! has received some generally positive reviews. PC Gamer UK's reviewer Andy Butcher gave the game a rating of 79% in its February 1997 issue, commending it with the following comment: "What makes it stand out from the many games based on a similar idea are its depth, and that it's been designed right from the start with multiplayer gaming in mind". Pitfalls he mentions include that the large number of options available can make the game confusing, and that the game is likely to be less appealing to single players.

GameSpot's reviewer T. Liam McDonald rated the game 7.3 "Good", applauding "a solid Windows interface, plain graphics, a wide range of custom options, deep strategic content, and compulsive playability" and stating that the game outdoes the similar game Spaceward Ho! 4.0. In Computer Game Review, Tasos Kaiafas wrote, "Stars! may not be brilliant, but it is fun and well designed."

The game was reviewed for the Polish magazine Gambler, with the reviewer awarding the game the score of 80%.

== Sequels ==
The huge popularity of the original Stars! game convinced the developers that there would be a market for a sequel. The developers of Stars! formed a company called Mare Crisium Studios and began development of Stars: Supernova Genesis. This was intended to be a much more advanced game, with significantly better graphics, and also to remove some of the irritations of the original, such as the high level of micromanagement.

However, there was little interest from games publishers, who by that time had become focused exclusively on the video game console and high-end 3D games markets, and so the project was eventually abandoned. Rights to the in-game graphics remained with Empire, until they were acquired by Zoo Games.

== See also ==
- Trade Wars
- VGA Planets
- Mass accelerator
