= Billy the Wizard: Rocket Broomstick Racing =

2006 video game

- European Wii box art
- Developer: Data Design Interactive
- Publishers: Europe; Metro3D Europe (PlayStation 2 and PC); Data Design Interactive (Wii); North America; Conspiracy Entertainment
- Platforms: Wii, PlayStation 2, Microsoft Windows
- Release: PlayStation 2, Windows: EU: 27 January 2006; Wii: EU: 17 September 2007; AU: 27 September 2007; NA: 5 October 2007
- Genres: Racing, platform
- Modes: Single-player, multiplayer

Billy the Wizard: Rocket Broomstick Racing is a racing and platform game by developer and publisher Data Design Interactive. It was originally released on January 27, 2006 for the PlayStation 2 and Microsoft Windows in European territories, while the Wii version was released in 2007 in North America and Europe.

The game was originally announced under the title Barry Hatter: The Sorcerer's Broomstick, but this later changed to Billy the Wizard.

== Gameplay ==
In the game, the player races alongside other wizards in the Broomstick Grand Prix. The game involves the player blasting opponents out of the sky with their magical powers, and collecting extra ammunition as they skim tree-tops and plunge under low bridges and archways.

The game has over 40 stages spread across 5 levels, with 8 playable characters from which to choose.

There are a few other non-racing portions. The player can also try to collect books or try to take down a dragon by shooting it with magical powers.

== Reception ==
IGN gave the game a 2.0/10, citing its sub-par menus, presentation, controls, and gameplay.
