= Beasts and Bumpkins =

1997 video game

- Developer: Worldweaver Ltd
- Publisher: Electronic Arts
- Composer: James Hannigan
- Platform: Windows
- Release: 1997
- Genre: Real-time strategy Simulation

Beasts and Bumpkins is a single player real-time strategy video game. It was developed by Worldweaver Ltd and published by Electronic Arts in 1997 and is available for the Windows platform.

In the game's storyline, the player was exiled by the king. They begin with limited resources and a few peasants to control. After building an empire and increasing their resources, the player can challenge Dark Lord Sabellian, who attacks the surrounding area.

== Gameplay ==
The game is a standard isometric 'god' style game. The player's goal is to complete one or more specific tasks on each level. This can be to collect a certain item, to kill a certain enemy or village, earn a certain amount of gold or survive for a specific duration of time.

In each level the player will have to build up their village and grow the economy and population. This involves using villagers to construct buildings and creating a village where they can reproduce. The player must provide a sufficient number of houses and resources before villagers will take it upon themselves to reproduce and create more units. There are specific levels where you already have a specific village and unit count to start with and are given the specific tasks such as protecting it for a set amount of time as waves of enemies close in on the village or defeating an enemy village before time runs out.

=== Units ===
During each level the player controls units called villagers. They have a stage based life cycle; from birth they go to childhood to a working adult after which comes their retirement and then eventually death. There are some special tasks that can be performed by all the villagers, including children, adults and old age people of both genders.

There are also certain skills or tasks that can only be done by adults. The working women are limited to farm work including milking cows, cutting the wheat for making bread and picking apples from the orchard for cider making. The working males can be given manual labour such as building structures and repairing damaged buildings. They are also the only unit that can be trained at the various guilds available in the game.

=== Buildings ===
Buildings provide the structure for a village in the game. Houses are the staple building for the village and are required to provide a place for the players villagers to sleep and for them to reproduce and create more villagers for the player to control.

To build a structure the player selects a building from the structures menu bar at the bottom of the screen and places the blueprint of that building on any available floorspace. The building will link a pathway automatically to the closest path available and the villagers will then construct it by working on the masonry and woodwork on the blueprint.

Placing buildings automatically creates paths linked to the closest available pathway. This makes pre-planning building placement important as created paths take up valuable space on the map and can prevent the player from expanding their village efficiently if that area of the map is already blocked by existing pathways.

There is a building hierarchy similar to a tech tree that means before players can build and train the more advanced units and buildings, they must have built the prerequisite structures (e.g. you can only build a farm after building a bakery).

=== Guilds and Special Units ===
The player can train an individual male villager at a guild to turn them into a special unit. This costs a set amount of gold per unit and gives that unit new attributes or skills. Training a footman at the footmans guild provides the male with better armor and attack damage for dealing with enemies. Training a priest at a church gives the unit activatable skills such as healing the plague and toggleable skills such as burying the dead. Other guild buildings include the town tall for training tax men, archers guild for training archers, wizards guild to train wizards, knights guild to train knights and the paladins guild to train paladins. To train a paladin, you must have a knight to send to the guild.

There is a limit to the number of special units each guild building can train; the footmans guild can train a maximum of 6 footmen, before they can train more the player must build another footmans guild to increase this maximum limit to 12.

=== Villages ===
Depending on the level, you will start you with a set of villagers and a few starter buildings. The player must build structures to advance their village, including farms, guilds and houses so that they may train special units and grow their economy and population. Deploying the villagers to perform various tasks, such as collecting water, farming and constructing the players buildings help further with building a strong economy and healthy village.

=== Resources ===
As well as the gold resource gained from selling the produce your villages create, the player must manage the health and happiness of their village.

The health of the village is affected by the availability of food as well as how clean the village is; the more dead bodies left around from old aged villages dying - the more likely the village will catch the plague and so become an unhealthy place to live.

Happiness is affected by several factors including the prices the player sets for certain produce, the tax set for when the village has trained a tax collector and the punishments set for when villagers are caught doing certain crimes. If a village is happier this affects the life span of villages meaning they age slower and take longer to go through their full life cycle.

== Reception ==
Reception

Review scores
Publication	Score
Hyper	84%
PC PowerPlay	92%
PC Zone	70%
Australian PC User	3.5/5
Ultimate PC	75%

The developer reported the game sold over 80,000 copies. PC Review considered the game failed to deliver on its concept, critiquing the game's "outdated" graphics and "shamefully stereotypical" voice acting.
