= Battleground 2: Gettysburg =

1995 video game

- Developer: TalonSoft
- Publisher: TalonSoft
- Platform: Microsoft Windows
- Release: 1995
- Genre: Computer wargame
- Modes: Single player, multiplayer

Battleground 2: Gettysburg is a 1995 turn-based computer wargame developed and published by TalonSoft. It the second game in the Battleground series.

== Gameplay ==
It simulated combat at the 1863 Battle of Gettysburg, using both a video version of miniature wargaming and board gaming. Terrain hex maps are 3D or 2D with various scales and sizes.

The basic platform for the Battleground series involves individual infantry and cavalry regiments, artillery batteries, and commanders. All are rated for strength, firepower, weaponry, morale, and movement. As a unit takes fire, it may become fatigued, disordered, or routed to the rear. Players compete against the computer's artificial intelligence or against another player via modem. Players may try a variety of 25 individual scenarios, or refight the entire Battle of Gettysburg. A Fog of War option enhances playing against the computer, as it hides units that are not in direct view of the enemy.

The game features video clips of battle reenactments, as well as Civil War music by folk singer Bobby Horton.

== Reception ==
Reception

Review scores
Publication	Score
PC Gamer (US)	90%
PC PowerPlay	8/10
Computer Games Strategy Plus	4/5
Computer Game Review	84/85/78

In Computer Gaming World's May 1996 issue, columnist Terry Coleman noted that Gettysburg was "selling quite briskly", and had popularized the American Civil War subgenre in wargames. The magazine's August issue that year reported that Gettysburg had sold more than 60,000 copies.

The editors of PC Gamer US and Computer Gaming World nominated Gettysburg as their pick for 1995's best computer wargame. Computer Gaming World reviewers argued Gettysburg "is so much sheer fun that it could have captured top honors in many prior years. As the Battleground series continues to mature, it continues to blend the best elements of board games and miniatures with the strengths of computer wargames." A reviewer for PC PowerPlay provided a less positive review, noting "the whole front end of the game is disappointing" with limited game options and scenarios, although praising the battle detail as "exceptional".
