= Battleground 9: Chickamauga =

1999 video game

- Developer: TalonSoft
- Publisher: TalonSoft
- Platform: Microsoft Windows
- Release: 1999
- Genre: Computer wargame
- Modes: Single-player, multiplayer

Battleground 9: Chickamauga is a 1999 computer wargame developed and published by TalonSoft. A simulation of conflict during the American Civil War, it is the ninth and final game in the Battleground series.

== Gameplay ==
Battleground 9: Chickamauga is a computer wargame that simulates military conflict during the American Civil War. It focuses on the Battle of Chickamauga and the Battle of Stones River.

== Development ==
Battleground 9: Chickamauga was developed and published by TalonSoft, as the ninth entry in the company's Battleground series. Its predecessor Battleground 8: Prelude to Waterloo had been intended as the final game in the franchise, but TalonSoft reported that Chickamauga was greenlit in response to fan demand. It was announced in June 1998 for a fall 1998 release. TalonSoft developed Chickamauga with an upgraded 32-bit version of the series' game engine. It is the fifth Battleground title to cover the American Civil War. The game reached gold status in December 1998.

TalonSoft announced that only 5,000 copies of Chickamauga would be printed. The company opted not to give the game a brick-and-mortar release, but rather to sell it directly via mail order. At the time, CNET Gamecenter's Mark Asher called this an "unusual move" that he hoped would succeed, as a way to allow "more niche titles [to be] developed".

== Reception ==
Reception

Review scores
| Publication | Score |
|---|---|
| Computer Games Strategy Plus | 4/5 |
| Computer Gaming World | 3.5/5 |
| CNET Gamecenter | 8/10 |
| PC Games | 4/5 |

Battleground 9: Chickamauga was nominated for the 1998 Charles S. Roberts Award for "Best Pre-Twentieth Century Computer Wargame", which ultimately went to The Great Battles Collector's Edition.

Tom Chick of Computer Games Strategy Plus offered Chickamauga a positive review, calling it "a solid send-off to one of the most polished and reliable hybrids of computer and board wargaming." In a positive review, PC Games' Dan Morris opined that "TalonSoft can keep pumping these out forever—they'll get no complaints from wargamers." Writing for CNET Gamecenter, Marc Dultz was similarly positive, citing its "incredible attention to detail and quality workmanship".
