= Battleground 6: Napoleon in Russia =

1997 video game

- Developer: TalonSoft
- Publisher: TalonSoft
- Series: Battleground
- Platform: Windows
- Release: May 15, 1997
- Genre: Computer wargame
- Modes: Single-player, multiplayer

Battleground 6: Napoleon in Russia is a 1997 computer wargame developed and published by TalonSoft. It the sixth entry in the Battleground series.

== Development ==
During development, TalonSoft reported trouble securing Russian music for Napoleon in Russia. The game was distributed by Broderbund, as part of a new deal by TalonSoft.

== Reception ==
Reception

Review scores
Publication	Score
Computer Games Strategy Plus	4/5
CNET Gamecenter	4/5
The Atlanta Journal-Constitution	3.5/5

Napoleon in Russia was a runner-up for Computer Gaming World's 1997 "Wargame Game of the Year" award, which ultimately went to Sid Meier's Gettysburg! The editors wrote that Napoleon in Russia "sent the Battleground engine out in style".
