= Star-King =

1991 video game

- Developer: Walker Vanning
- Publisher: Spacewar Simulations Company
- Release: 1991
- Genre: Strategy

Star-King is a 1991 video game published by Spacewar Simulations Company and designed by Walker Vanning.

== Gameplay ==
Star-King is a strategic level game in which each player starts off with a single planet and must conquer the whole play-area to win. One to seven players can play, and the game features many different levels of play on a 3-D gameboard. On each turn, a player can build ships and colonies and can then move the ships around the gridded play area. The screen displays a row of numbers listing the order in which the tactical information is displayed.

== Publication history ==
Star-King was the first game published by the small Spacewar Simulations Company of San Rafael, California.

== Reception ==
Dave Arneson reviewed the game for Computer Gaming World, and stated that "For the same enjoyment, and less effort, one could play Avalon Hill's Galaxy on an old Apple II. By comparison, Star-King lacks the user-friendly features, entertaining sound effects, crude animation (in the results phases) and a fairly exciting play system for multi-player action that Galaxy had over ten years ago. When one considers that Galaxy was even written for a 30K machine, that makes Star-King a solid miss in this market, unless one simply must have a multi-player modem game with a steep learning curve."

The book The PC Games Bible called the graphics "average".
