= VGA Planets =

- Developer: Tim Wisseman
- Platforms: DOS, Macintosh, Web
- Release: 1992
- Genre: Turn-based strategy
- Mode: Multiplayer

VGA Planets is a multi-player space strategy war game originally released in 1992. The game simulates combat in space between galactic scale empires. It follows the 4X game (eXplore, eXpand, eXploit and eXterminate) model: The players start with a home world, and have to build spaceships, explore the galaxy, colonize planets, mine minerals, build up their industry.

The game is set in the "Echo Cluster" where 11 different races fight for control. It was one of the first indie games to become commercially successful. It was notable for being played via email, without a central server: each game of up to 11 players is handled independently, with the players sending their orders for each turn to the computer which manages that game.

A hosted web version has been available since November 2010.

== History ==
The game was originally released in 1992 but became well known as a play-by-mail game in 1994 with version 3, although the prior version 2.2 was already played worldwide. Version 3 allows up to 11 players to join, each of them leading one of the 11 possible races. In 1994, the game was distributed as shareware, which could be purchased for $15 and registration was free. Although games could be set up directly by any group of players, a common way to find groups was to post and answer game invitations on the Usenet group rec.games.vga-planets.

The predefined races are modeled after Star Trek, Star Wars and Battlestar Galactica, though custom races can be created with special tools. Each predefined race has some special powers and specific fields of expertise (for example: Cyborgs can assimilate native races into colonists; Robots are expert minelayers; Birdmen excel at spy tactics and cloaking).

VGA Planets follows the 4X game (eXplore, eXpand, eXploit and eXterminate) model: The players start with a home world, and have to build spaceships, explore the galaxy, colonize planets, mine minerals, build up their industry, etc. The game has no built-in victory condition: the players have to agree on one before starting a game.

=== VGA Planets 3 ===
Clients up to version 3.0 were DOS programs; from version 3.5 on there were clients for Microsoft Windows. In addition, there are cross-platform third-party tools, including clients written in Java. A third-party Linux client named "GNOME War Pad" is also available.

=== VGA Planets 4 ===
This is an expanded version of the original, with many new races and many new rules, expanded fleet combat - and the addition of ground combat units.

=== VGA Planets 5 ===
This new browser-based version, based on version 4, was supposed to be published in 2011, but in February 2012 was put on hold indefinitely.

=== VGA Planets Nu ===
In May 2010 a new project was approved by Tim Wisseman called VGA Planets Nu to rebuild the version 3 game with modern web-based technology. The Nu project was developed over the course of 2010 and was released for live games in November 2010.

VGA Planets Nu is a remake of the version 3.0 game which runs on the web in a web browser or via the mobile app. The Nu project aims to overcome the technology challenges found in the older VGA Planets 3 versions which do not run on modern technology and create many barriers to entry for new players. Players sign up and can start playing immediately.

This is now the most common way to play VGA Planets.

== Original gameplay ==
The gameplay for both version 3 and 4 uses three programs: a master program that allows the creation of a universe with the desired characteristics; a host program that acts as a server; and a copy of the client program for each player.

First, the host sends a file with the initial conditions to each player. The client program allows the player to view data about the game and make decisions. Once the player has finished giving orders for the turn, either the client program or an external helper program takes the data, creates a turn file (usually with a .TRN extension), and sends it to the host person, who feeds all the turn files into the host program. The host processes all the turns and creates new status files (usually with a .RST extension), which are then sent back to the players. This process can be fully automated (the host can be an automatic server).

At the time that the game gained popularity, LANs and the Internet were not generally available to the public, so VGA Planets was primarily played via dial-up bulletin board systems (BBS), gradually moving to email as a PBEM as it became more widely available. The turn files and the game status files were transferred to and from the BBS or by email manually. This required games to have a regular hosting schedule.

== Reception ==
Reception

Review score
Publication	Score
Computer Gaming World	version 3.0 4/5

Award
Publication	Award
Computer Gaming World	Finalist (Honorable Mention), Online Game of the Year, June 1994

Computer Gaming World in 1993 and 1994 noted VGA Planets 3.0's "clunky" interface and lack of single-player AI, but approved the "great deal Mr. Wisseman is giving the computer gaming public" for $15, and his "constant striving to improve his product". The magazine recommended that "anyone who enjoys spaceploitation" should try the game, stating that it "is very similar in feel to a play-by-mail system but without the cost and wait". A May 1994 survey in the magazine of strategic space games set in the year 2000 and later gave VGA Planets 3.0 four stars out of five, calling it "excellent ... easy to learn, tough to master". Another article in the issue described 3.0 as "a wonderful blend of Reach for the Stars, Master of Orion and Diplomacy".

In June 1994 VGA Planets was named a Finalist (Honorable Mention) for Computer Gaming World's "Online Game of the Year" award, losing to Multiplayer BattleTech. It was the first PBEM game nominated for the award.

The game sold more than 50,000 copies.

== See also ==
- Stars!
