= Battleground 4: Shiloh =

1996 video game

- Cover art
- Developer: TalonSoft
- Publisher: TalonSoft
- Platform: Microsoft Windows
- Release: July 23, 1996
- Genre: Turn-based computer wargame
- Modes: Single-player, multiplayer

Battleground 4: Shiloh is a turn-based computer wargame developed by TalonSoft in 1996 and the fourth issue in the Battleground series.

== Gameplay ==
It simulated combat at the 1862 Battle of Shiloh, using both a video version of miniature wargaming and board gaming. Terrain hex maps are 3D or 2D with various scales and sizes.

The basic platform for the Battleground series involves individual infantry and cavalry regiments, artillery batteries, and commanders. All are rated for strength, firepower, weaponry, morale, and movement. As a unit takes fire, it may become fatigued, disordered, or routed to the rear. Players compete against the computer's artificial intelligence or against another player via modem. Players may try a variety of 25 individual scenarios, or refight the entire Battle of Shiloh. A Fog of War option enhances playing against the computer, as it hides units that are not in direct view of the enemy. The game also includes scenarios related to the Battle of Wilson's Creek and the Battle of Prairie Grove.

The game features video clips of battle reenactments, as well as Civil War music by folk singer Bobby Horton.

== Reception ==
Reception

Review scores
| Publication | Score |
|---|---|
| Computer Games Strategy Plus | 4/5 |
| boot | 85% |
| CNET Gamecenter | 4/5 |
| PC Games | B− |

Shiloh won Computer Gaming World's 1996 "Wargame of the Year" award. The editors wrote, "Sure, there's micromanaging. And yes, there's complexity, too. But the learning curve is justified, because this is simply the best 19th-century system ever designed for a wargame—realistic, challenging, and eminently replayable." The three Battleground games of 1996—Shiloh, Antietam and Waterloo—collectively won Computer Games Strategy Plus's wargame of the year award.

The Computer Game Developers Conference nominated Shiloh for its 1996 "Best Music or Soundtrack" Spotlight Award, which ultimately went to Quake.

The game received a score of 85% from boot.

== Reviews ==
- Australian Realms #30
