= Battleground 3: Waterloo =

1996 video game

- Cover art
- Developer: TalonSoft
- Publisher: TalonSoft
- Series: Battleground
- Platform: Windows
- Release: NA: May 23, 1996
- Genre: Computer wargame
- Modes: Single-player, multiplayer

Battleground 3: Waterloo is a 1996 computer wargame developed and published by TalonSoft. It is the third entry in the Battleground series.

== Gameplay ==
The game features the Battle of Waterloo which was the final defeat for Napoleon Bonaparte and his French Empire.

== Reception ==
Reception

Review scores
Publication	Score
Next Generation	4/5
PC Gamer (US)	91%
Computer Games Strategy Plus	4/5
PC Games	B+

Terry Coleman of Computer Gaming World reported in August 1996 that "BG: Waterloo had, according to Empire (the distributor for Talonsoft in the US), the highest 'buy-in' at retail chains of any historical wargame they've released this year."

A Next Generation critic said Battleground 3: Waterloo "is as good as PC war games get, featuring everything players could want in a turn-based bloodbath: historical accuracy, pleasing graphics, an easy-to-use interface, and strategic subtleties." He remarked that while the game only covers one battle, it has considerable breadth due to its many options, including the ability to play either a historically accurate campaign or a number of "what if" scenarios. He scored it four out of five stars.

The four Battleground games of 1996—Bulge-Ardennes, Shiloh, Antietam and Waterloo—collectively won Computer Games Strategy Plus's wargame of the year award for that year. Waterloo was a finalist for Computer Gaming World's 1996 "Wargame of the Year" award, which ultimately went to Battleground 4: Shiloh. Waterloo was a runner-up for Computer Game Entertainment's 1996 "Best War Game" prize, which ultimately went to Tigers on the Prowl 2. The magazine's editors called both games "top-notch".

In 1996, Computer Gaming World named Waterloo the 115th best game ever. The editors wrote, "The grand age of warfare comes to life with colorful uniforms, delightful landscapes, and above-average opponent AI in this recent release." The magazine's wargame columnist Terry Coleman named it his pick for the 10th-best computer wargame released by late 1996.
