= Battleground 7: Bull Run =

1997 wargame video game

- Developer: TalonSoft
- Publisher: TalonSoft
- Platform: Microsoft Windows
- Release: May 15, 1997
- Genre: Computer wargame
- Modes: Single-player, multiplayer

Battleground 7: Bull Run is a 1997 computer wargame developed and published by TalonSoft. It is the seventh entry in the Battleground series.

== Gameplay ==
Bull Run is a computer wargame that simulates combat at the 1861 First Battle of Bull Run and the 1862 Second Battle of Bull Run. Its visuals draw from both miniature wargaming and board gaming. Terrain hex maps are 3D or 2D with various scales and sizes.

It follows the basic platform for the Battleground series, involving individual infantry and cavalry regiments, artillery batteries, and commanders. All are rated for strength, firepower, weaponry, morale, and movement. As a unit takes fire, it may become fatigued, disordered, or routed to the rear. Players compete against the computer's artificial intelligence or against another player via modem. Players may try a variety of individual scenarios, or refight the entire battle of First or Second Bull Run (known as Manassas in the South). Players can also fight the related skirmishes of Blackburn's Ford and Brawner's Farm (also known as Groveton). A Fog of War option enhances playing against the computer, as it hides units that are not in direct view of the enemy.

== Development ==
Bull Run was distributed by Broderbund, as part of a new deal by TalonSoft. It was the first Battleground title to support online multiplayer.

The game features video clips of battle reenactments, as well as Civil War music by folk singer Bobby Horton.

== Reception ==
Reception

Review scores
Publication	Score
Computer Games Strategy Plus	4.5/5
Computer Gaming World	4/5
CNET Gamecenter	4/5
