= Tigers on the Prowl 2 =

1996 video game

- Developer(s): Scott Hamilton
- Publisher(s): HPS Simulations
- Release: 1996
- Genre(s): Wargame

Tigers on the Prowl 2 is computer wargame released in 1996 by HPS Simulations. It is the sequel to Tigers on the Prowl.

== Gameplay ==
Tigers on the Prowl 2 is a World War II tactical wargame.

Maps are about 3 x 7 km. One hex represents 100metres. Turns are a minute and a game usually last 90 minutes but you can play a game indefinitely. Forces vary in size from a battalion to a brigade (3 battalions) plus support units. You can create your own custom force choosing from a huge database of Russian & German soldiers, guns, vehicles and planes. The map is viewed top down and has coloured contours for hills etc. There are lots of different terrain types including buildings, roads, swamps etc. The game can be played single player against A.I. or PBEM two player.

== Reception ==
Reception

Review scores
Publication	Score
Computer Gaming World	4/5 stars
Computer Games Strategy Plus	4.5/5 stars

Award
Publication	Award
Computer Game Entertainment	Best War Game

In Computer Gaming World, Jim Cobb wrote, "The most realistic WWII tactical game on the market gets even better with improved AI and interface." However, he criticized its visuals and audio, and wrote that its high difficulty and limited accessibility make it "very intimidating, even for veteran gamers." Computer Games Strategy Plus's Rex Whitfield called it "a must-buy" for experienced wargame players, but noted that "novices may find themselves overwhelmed". He praised its interface for being easier to use than its predecessor's.

The editors of Computer Game Entertainment awarded Tigers on the Prowl 2 their 1996 "Best War Game" prize. A writer for the magazine concluded, "Though sometimes the pace is glacial, and on occasion the game seems more work than play, Tigers 2 is so good at what it does that I can't really see any other choice for the best wargame [of 1996]."
