= TalonSoft =

American video game developer and publisher

TalonSoft, Inc.
- Company type: Subsidiary
- Industry: Video games
- Founded: March 1995; 30 years ago
- Founders: Jim Rose; John Davidson
- Defunct: 2002
- Fate: Dissolved
- Headquarters: Baltimore, US
- Key people: Jim Rose (president, CCO); Chris Mate (general manager)
- Parent: Take-Two Interactive (1998–2002)

TalonSoft, Inc. was an American video game developer and publisher based in Baltimore.

== History ==
TalonSoft was founded in March 1995, by video game producers Jim Rose and John Davidson. On December 24, 1998, Take-Two Interactive announced that it had acquired TalonSoft, stating that they planned to push their capabilities in the personal computer video game market. The deal comprised 1,033,336 shares accounted as a pooling-of-interest. Bengur Bryan represented TalonSoft in the purchase. By early 1999, TalonSoft's most successful game was East Front, with sales near 90,000 units. TalonSoft ceased all operations in 2002. In October 2005, Matrix Games acquired the rights to publish all games developed by TalonSoft.

== List of games ==
| Title | Platform(s) | Release date | Developer | Ref. |
|---|---|---|---|---|
| Battleground: Ardennes | Microsoft Windows | 1995 | TalonSoft | |
| Battleground 2: Gettysburg | Microsoft Windows | 1995 | TalonSoft | |
| Battleground 4: Shiloh | Microsoft Windows | 1996 | TalonSoft | |
| Battleground 3: Waterloo | Microsoft Windows | May 23, 1996 | TalonSoft | |
| Battleground 5: Antietam | Microsoft Windows | December 31, 1996 | TalonSoft | |
| Age of Sail | Microsoft Windows | November 30, 1996 | TalonSoft | |
| Battleground 6: Napoleon in Russia | Microsoft Windows | April 30, 1997 | TalonSoft | |
| East Front | Microsoft Windows | November 30, 1997 | TalonSoft | |
| Battleground 7: Bull Run | Microsoft Windows | 1997 | TalonSoft | |
| Battleground 8: Prelude to Waterloo | Microsoft Windows | 1997 | TalonSoft | |
| Tribal Rage | Microsoft Windows | May 31, 1998 | Disintegrator | |
| West Front | Microsoft Windows | November 10, 1998 | TalonSoft | |
| Battleground 9: Chickamauga | Microsoft Windows | December 15, 1998 | TalonSoft | |
| East Front: Campaign CD 1 | Microsoft Windows | 1998 | TalonSoft | |
| The Operational Art of War Vol 1: 1939-1955 | Microsoft Windows | 1998 | TalonSoft | |
| The Operational Art of War Vol. 1: 1939–1955 – Battle Pack I Scenario Add-on Disk | Microsoft Windows | January 14, 1999 | TalonSoft | |
| West Front: Battle Pack 1 | Microsoft Windows | February 24, 1999 | TalonSoft | |
| Battle of Britain | Microsoft Windows | February 28, 1999 | TalonSoft | |
| East Front II | Microsoft Windows | March 31, 1999 | TalonSoft | |
| The Operational Art of War II: Modern Battles 1956–2000 | Microsoft Windows | April 30, 1999 | TalonSoft | |
| Jagged Alliance 2 | Microsoft Windows | June 30, 1999 | Sirtech Canada | |
| Hidden & Dangerous | Microsoft Windows | July 31, 1999 | Illusion Softworks | |
| West Front: Operation Sea Lion | Microsoft Windows | October 29, 1999 | TalonSoft | |
| The Operational Art of War II: Flashpoint Kosovo | Microsoft Windows | October 30, 1999 | TalonSoft | |
| JetFighter IV: Fortress America | Microsoft Windows | November 4, 1999 | Mission Studios | |
| 12 O'Clock High: Bombing the Reich | Microsoft Windows | November 30, 1999 | TalonSoft | |
| Rising Sun | Microsoft Windows | February 6, 2000 | TalonSoft | |
| Hidden & Dangerous: Devil's Bridge | Microsoft Windows | February 7, 2000 | Illusion Softworks | |
| Tzar: The Burden of the Crown | Microsoft Windows | March 29, 2000 | Haemimont Games | |
| Codename Eagle | Microsoft Windows | March 31, 2000 | Refraction Games | |
| Martian Gothic: Unification | Microsoft Windows | April 30, 2000 | Creative Reality | |
| Dogs of War | Microsoft Windows | June 30, 2000 | Silicon Dreams Studio | |
| Hidden & Dangerous | Dreamcast | July 10, 2000 | Illusion Softworks | |
| Rising Sun: Imperial Strike | Microsoft Windows | July 18, 2000 | Mission Studios | |
| Metal Fatigue | Microsoft Windows | July 31, 2000 | Zono | |
| Age of Sail II | Microsoft Windows | February 1, 2001 | Akella | |
| East Front II: Fall of the Reich | Microsoft Windows | March 15, 2001 | TalonSoft | |
| Merchant Prince II | Microsoft Windows | May 1, 2001 | Holistic Design | |
| Divided Ground: Middle East Conflict 1948–1973 | Microsoft Windows | August 1, 2001 | TalonSoft | |
