= Battleground (video game series) =

- Genre: Turn-based computer wargame
- Developer: TalonSoft
- Publisher: TalonSoft
- Platform: Windows
- First release: Battleground: Bulge-Ardennes; 1995
- Latest release: Battleground 9: Chickamauga; 1999

Battleground is a series of turn-based computer wargames developed and published by TalonSoft for Microsoft Windows between 1995 and 1999. Nine games were released in the series, each based on a different historical battle.

== Games ==
=== Battleground: Bulge-Ardennes ===
Battleground: Bulge-Ardennes is the first game to be released in the Battleground series. It was developed and published by TalonSoft and released in 1995.

=== Battleground 2: Gettysburg ===
Battleground 2: Gettysburg is a turn-based computer wargame developed by TalonSoft in 1995. It simulated combat at the 1863 Battle of Gettysburg, using both a video version of miniature wargaming and board gaming. Terrain hex maps are 3D or 2D with various scales and sizes.

=== Battleground 3: Waterloo ===
Battleground 3: Waterloo is the third game in the Battleground series. It was developed and published by TalonSoft and released on May 31, 1996. The game features the Battle of Waterloo which was the final defeat for Napoleon Bonaparte and his French Empire.

=== Battleground 4: Shiloh ===
Battleground 4: Shiloh is a turn-based computer wargame developed by TalonSoft in 1996, the fourth issue in the Battleground series. It simulated combat at the 1862 Battle of Shiloh, using both a video version of miniature wargaming and board gaming. Terrain hex maps are 3D or 2D with various scales and sizes.

=== Battleground 5: Antietam ===
Battleground 5: Antietam is a turn-based computer wargame developed by TalonSoft in 1996, the fifth issue in the popular Battleground series. It simulated combat at the 1862 Battle of Antietam and the earlier Battle of South Mountain during the American Civil War's Maryland Campaign, using both a video version of miniature wargaming and board gaming. Terrain hex maps are 3D or 2D with various scales and sizes.

=== Battleground 6: Napoleon in Russia ===
Battleground 6: Napoleon in Russia is the sixth game to be released in the Battleground series. It was developed and published by TalonSoft and released on April 30, 1997.

=== Battleground 7: Bull Run ===
Battleground 7: Bull Run is a turn-based computer wargame developed by TalonSoft in 1997, the seventh issue in the popular Battleground series. It simulated combat at the 1861 First Battle of Bull Run and the 1862 Second Battle of Bull Run, using both a video version of miniature wargaming and board gaming. Terrain hex maps are 3D or 2D with various scales and sizes.

=== Battleground 8: Prelude to Waterloo ===
Battleground 8: Prelude to Waterloo is the eighth game in the Battleground series. It was developed and published by TalonSoft, and was shipped to retailers on September 15, 1997. At the time, TalonSoft announced it as the final game in the Battleground series.

=== Battleground 9: Chickamauga ===
Battleground 9: Chickamauga is the ninth game to be released in the Battleground series. It was developed and published by TalonSoft and released in 1999.

Only 5,000 copies of the game were printed. It received a score of 8/10 from CNET Gamecenter. It was nominated for the 1998 Charles Roberts Award for "Best Pre-Twentieth Century Computer Wargame", which ultimately went to The Great Battles Collector's Edition.

== Reception ==
In 1998, Computer Gaming World dubbed Battleground "the most successful wargame series".

PC Gamer US nominated Bulge-Ardennes and Gettysburg for its 1995 "Best Wargame" award, although they lost to Steel Panthers.

The three Battleground games of 1996—Shiloh, Antietam and Waterloo—collectively won Computer Games Strategy Plus's wargame of the year award for that year.

Waterloo and Antietam were runners-up for Computer Game Entertainment's 1996 "Best War Game" prize, which ultimately went to Tigers on the Prowl 2. The magazine's editors called both games "top-notch", and summarized Antietam as "the best iteration yet of TalonSoft's successful Civil War game system."

The Battleground series, collectively, was named the 75th best computer game ever by PC Gamer UK in 1997. The editors called it "a fine expose of table top wargaming on the PC".
