= List of Vietnam War games =

The Vietnam War has been depicted in many games.

== Video games ==
While not as popular a topic as World War II or fictional wars set in modern times, the Vietnam War has been the setting for numerous video games.

Name	Year	Platform	Publisher
'Nam 1965-1975	1991	Amiga, Atari ST, DOS	Domark
19 Part One: Boot Camp	1988	Commodore 64, ZX Spectrum	Cascade Games
7554: Glorious Memories Revived	2011	Microsoft Windows	Emobi Games JSC
Air Assault Task Force	2008	Microsoft Windows	ProSIM Company
Air Conflicts: Vietnam	2013	Microsoft Windows, PlayStation 3, Xbox 360, PlayStation 4	bitComposer Games
Arma 3 Creator DLC: S.O.G. Prairie Fire	2021	Microsoft Windows	Bohemia Interactive, Savage Game Design
Battlefield Vietnam	2004	Microsoft Windows	Electronic Arts
Battlefield: Bad Company 2: Vietnam	2010	Microsoft Windows, PlayStation 3, Xbox 360	Electronic Arts
Call of Duty: Black Ops	2010	Mac, Microsoft Windows, Nintendo DS, PlayStation 3, Xbox 360, Wii	Activision, Square Enix
Call of Duty: Black Ops: Declassified	2012	PlayStation Vita	Activision, Square Enix
Call of Duty: Black Ops Cold War	2020	Microsoft Windows, PlayStation 4, PlayStation 5, Xbox One, Xbox Series X/S	Activision
Campaign Series Vietnam 1948-1967	2022	Microsoft Windows	Campaign Series Legion
Chuck Yeager's Air Combat	1991	DOS	Electronic Arts
Combat Actions: Vietnam	2019	Android, iOS, Amazon Kindle, Mac, Microsoft Windows	digital Gameworks LLC
Conflict in Vietnam	1986	Apple II, Atari 8-bit, Commodore 64, PC Booter	MicroProse Software, Inc.
Conflict: Vietnam	2004	Microsoft Windows, PlayStation 2, Xbox, Mobile phone, N-Gage	Global Star Software, SCi Games
Elite Warriors: Vietnam	2005	Microsoft Windows	Bold Games
Eve of Destruction Redux	2018	Microsoft Windows	Agger Interactive
Far Cry 5: Hours of Darkness	2018	Microsoft Windows, PlayStation 4, Xbox One	Ubisoft Entertainment SA
Flight of the Intruder	1990	Amiga, Atari ST, DOS, NES	Spectrum HoloByte, Mindscape
Green Berets	2001	Microsoft Windows	Take-Two Interactive
Gunboat	1990	Amiga, Amstrad CPC, DOS, TurboGrafx-16, ZX Spectrum	Accolade
Leave No One Behind: Ia Drang	2022	Microsoft Windows	Gaming 301
LHX Attack Chopper	1990	DOS	Electronic Arts
Line of Sight: Vietnam	2003	Microsoft Windows	Infogrames, Atari
Lost Patrol	1990	Amiga, Atari ST, DOS	Ocean Software
M.I.A.: Missing in Action	1989	Arcade	Konami
M.I.A.: Missing in Action	1998	Microsoft Windows	GT Interactive
Made Man	2006	Microsoft Windows, PlayStation 2	Mastertronic, Aspyr
Magicka: Vietnam (Expansion)	2011	Microsoft Windows	Paradox Interactive
Marine Heavy Gunner: Vietnam	2004	Microsoft Windows	Brainbox Games
Men of Valor	2004	Microsoft Windows, Xbox	Vivendi Universal Games
Men of War: Vietnam	2011	Microsoft Windows	1C Company
Military Conflict: Vietnam	2022	Microsoft Windows	dustfade
Modern Air Power: War Over Vietnam	2004	Microsoft Windows	HPS Simulations
NAM	1986	Apple II, Atari 8-bit, Commodore 64	Strategic Simulations
NAM	1998	DOS	GT Interactive
NAM-1975	1991	Neo Geo, Neo Geo CD	SNK
Nam - Bare Feet Iron Will	2018	Browser game	Gameflare.com, PacoGames.com, GameArter
Nam - The Resistance War	2018	Browser game	PacoGames.com
Operation: Vietnam	2007	Nintendo DS	Majesco
Platoon (2002 video game)	2002	Microsoft Windows	Monte Cristo, Strategy First
PunjiVR	2022	Microsoft Windows	Camden Cleveland
Radio Commander	2019	Microsoft Windows	Games Operators, Serious Sim
Rambo (1985)	1985	Amstrad CPC, Commodore 64, ZX Spectrum	Ocean Software
Rambo (MSX)	1985	MSX	Pack-In-Video
Rambo: First Blood Part II	1986	Master System	Sega
Rambo (1987)	1987	NES	Acclaim
Rambo (2008 video game)	2008	Arcade game	Sega
Rambo: The Video Game	2014	Microsoft Windows, PlayStation 3, Xbox 360	Reef Entertainment
Red Storm : Vietnam War	2021	Android, iOS	MeoPlay
Rise of Nations: Thrones and Patriots	2004	Mac, Microsoft Windows	Microsoft Game Studios
Rising Storm 2: Vietnam	2017	Microsoft Windows	Antimatter Games, Tripwire Interactive
Rock'n'Roll: Card Wargame	TBA	Microsoft Windows	WallRus Group
SEAL Team	1993	DOS	Electronic Arts
Search & Rescue: Vietnam Med Evac	2002	Microsoft Windows	Global Star Software
Shellshock: Nam '67	2004	Microsoft Windows, PlayStation 2, Xbox	Eidos Interactive
Shellshock 2: Blood Trails	2009	Microsoft Windows, PlayStation 3, Xbox 360	Eidos Interactive
Soldier Boyz	1997	Microsoft Windows	Dreamcatcher Interactive
Soldiers Of Vietnam - American Campaign	2020	Android	Posh Toffee Games
Squad Battles: Dien Bien Phu	2009	Microsoft Windows	HPS Games
Squad Battles: Tour of Duty	2002	Microsoft Windows	HPS Games
Squad Battles: Vietnam	2001	Microsoft Windows	HPS Games
Steel Panthers II: Modern Battles	1996	DOS	Strategic Simulations Inc.
Strike Fighters 2: Vietnam	2009	Microsoft Windows	Third Wire
Tactical Heroes 2: Platoons	2018	Android, iOS	eRepublik Labs
The Hell in Vietnam	2007	Microsoft Windows	City Interactive
The Operational Art of War II: Modern Battles 1956-2000	1999	Microsoft Windows	Talonsoft
Thud Ridge: American Aces In 'Nam	1988	Commodore 64, DOS	Three-Sixty Pacific
Tunnel Rats (video game)	2009	Microsoft Windows	Boll AG
VC	1982	Apple II, Atari 8-bit, DOS, PC-88, TRS-80, TRS-80 CoCo	Avalon Hill
Viet-Afghan (3rd-party expansion)	2010	Microsoft Windows	FRVP
Vietcong (video game)	2003	Microsoft Windows	Gathering of Developers
Vietcong 2	2005	Microsoft Windows	2K Games
Vietnam (1995 video game)	1995	DOS	Viper Software, CompuServe
Vietnam '65	2015	Microsoft Windows	Slitherine Strategies
Vietnam '66	TBA	Microsoft Windows	Every Single Soldier
Vietnam: Black Ops	2000	Microsoft Windows	ValuSoft
Vietnam: Ho Chi Minh Trail	2003	Microsoft Windows	ValuSoft, Inc., Media-Service 2000
Vietnam 2: Special Assignment	2001	Microsoft Windows	ValuSoft, Inc.
Vietnam War: The Last Battle	2017	Browser game	PacoGames.com
VNW - To be determined to fight	2020	Browser game	PacoGames.com
When I Was Young	2020	Microsoft Windows, Nintendo Switch	WallRus Group, Art Games Studio S.A.
Whirlwind over Vietnam	2006	Microsoft Windows	Evolved Games Developer
Wings over Vietnam	2004	Microsoft Windows	Bold Games

=== Cancelled titles ===
Name	Year	Platform	Publisher
Apocalypse Now (video game)	Cancelled (2017)	Microsoft Windows, Xbox One, PlayStation 4, MacOS, Linux	Erebus LLC
Call of Duty: Vietnam	Cancelled (2011)	Xbox 360, PlayStation 3, Microsoft Windows	Activision
Vietnam (1986 video game)	1986	Abandoned/cancelled	Orpheus Software

=== Mods ===
Name	Year	Platform	Publisher
ARMA: Armed Assault: Unsung Vietnam War mod	2006	Microsoft Windows	Bohemia Interactive, Unsung team
ARMA 2: Unsung Vietnam War mod and VTE Vietnam The Experience	2009	Microsoft Windows	Bohemia Interactive, Unsung team
ARMA 3: Unsung Vietnam War mod	2015	Microsoft Windows	Bohemia Interactive, Unsung team
Eve of Destruction Classic (Mod)	2003	Microsoft Windows	Lotte|EoD Devs Team
Eve of Destruction Vietnam (Mod)	2004	Microsoft Windows	Lotte|EoD Devs Team
Eve of Destruction 2 (Mod)	2007	Microsoft Windows	Lotte|EoD Devs Team
Operation Flashpoint: Unsung Vietnam War mod	2004	Microsoft Windows	Bohemia Interactive, Unsung team
The 'Nam: Vietnam Combat Operations (Mod)	2020	Microsoft Windows	Tiger Yan
Vietnam '65 (Mod)	2017	Microsoft Windows	Lightning's team
Vietnam at War (Mod)	2022	Microsoft Windows	AFS

== Digital board games ==
=== Lock 'n Load Publishing's LnLT Digital series ===
- Lock 'n Load Tactical Digital: Core Game (2020)
  - 3+ DLC expansions (2020 to 2020's)

=== Other digital board games ===
- Rock'n'Roll: Card Wargame (TBA)

== Action-adventure game ==
- Rambo (1987)
- Magicka: Vietnam (2011)
- When I Was Young (2020)

== Run and gun ==
- M.I.A.: Missing in Action (1989)
- Decolonators (2021)

== Top-down shooter ==
- Rambo (1985)
- Rambo (MSX)
- Rambo: First Blood Part II (1986)

== Rail shooters ==
- Soldier Boyz (FMV rail shooter) (1997)
- Vietnam: Ho Chi Minh Trail (2003)
- Rambo (2008 video game) (2008) (Light gun arcade game)
- Rambo: The Video Game (2014)

== Arcade video games ==
- NAM-1975 (1990)
- NAM (video game) (1998)
- Vietnam: Black Ops (2000)
- Vietnam 2: Special Assignment (2001) (In the game, it is called Vietnam 2: Black Ops Special Assignment or Vietnam: Black Ops 2)
- Eve of Destruction Classic (2003) (Mod for Battlefield 1942)
- Battlefield Vietnam (2004)
- Eve of Destruction Vietnam (2004) (Mod for Battlefield Vietnam)
- Marine Heavy Gunner: Vietnam (2004)
- Shellshock: Nam '67 (2004)
- Made Man (video game) (2006)
- Eve of Destruction 2 (2007) (Mod for Battlefield 2)
- The Hell in Vietnam (2008)
- Shellshock 2: Blood Trails (2009)
- Tunnel Rats: 1968 (2009)
- Call of Duty: Black Ops (2010)
- Battlefield: Bad Company 2: Vietnam (2010)
- 7554: Glorious Memories Revived (2011)
- Call of Duty: Black Ops: Declassified (2012)
- Vietnam War: The Last Battle (2017)
- Nam - The Resistance War (2018)
- Far Cry 5: Hours of Darkness (2018)
- Eve of Destruction Redux (2018)
- Nam - Bare Feet Iron Will (2018)
- Call of Duty: Black Ops Cold War (2020)
- Soldiers Of Vietnam - American Campaign (2020)
- VNW - To be determined to fight (2020)
- Red Storm : Vietnam War (2021)

== Tactical shooter games ==
The Vietcong series

- Vietcong (video game) (2003)
  - Vietcong: Fist Alpha (2004)
  - Vietcong: Red Dawn (Addon (2005))
- Vietcong 2 (2005)
  - Vietcong 2: Fist Bravo (Addon (2006))

Other tactical shooters

- Line of Sight: Vietnam (2003)
- Conflict: Vietnam (2004)
- Men of Valor (2004)
- Elite Warriors: Vietnam (2005)
- Rising Storm 2: Vietnam (2017)
- PunjiVR (2022)
- Military Conflict: Vietnam (2022)
- Operation: Rolling Stone (2023) (DLC for Operation: Harsh Doorstop (2023))
- Beyond Enemy Lines: Vietnam (2026)
- Hell Let Loose: Vietnam (2026)

== Management simulations ==
- VC (1982)
- 'Nam 1965-1975 (1991)

== Military simulations ==
- Project Reality: BF2 (2005)
- Arma 3 Creator DLC: S.O.G. Prairie Fire (2021)
- Rolling Thunder: Vietnam (2025. EA.)

== Jet simulators ==
- Flight of the Intruder (video game) (1990) (aka. Flight of the Intruder: The Air War in Vietnam)
  - Flight of the Intruder (1991 NES game. aka Phantom Air Mission.)
- Chuck Yeager's Air Combat (1991)
- Vietnam (1995 video game) (1995)
- Wings Over Vietnam (2004)
  - Strike Fighters 2: Vietnam (2009) (Enhanced edition of Wings Over Vietnam)
- Gunship III (2012)
- Air Conflicts: Vietnam (2013) (Also under helicopter sims list)

== Helicopter simulators ==
- LHX Attack Chopper (1990)
- M.I.A.: Missing in Action (1998)
- Search & Rescue: Vietnam Med Evac (2002)
- Whirlwind over Vietnam (2006)
- Air Conflicts: Vietnam (2013) (Also under jet sims list)

== Naval simulators ==
- Gunboat (video game) (1990)

== Real-time tactics games ==
=== URB Games' Mud and Blood series ===
- Mud and Blood: Vietnam (2004) (Online)
- Mud and Blood: Recon (MnBR) (2015) (Online)
- Occupation Force: Vietnam (OFV) (2016) (Online. Abandoned EA title.)
- Recondo (TBA, 2025?)

=== Other real-time tactics games ===
- Green Berets (2001)
- Operation: Vietnam (2007)
- Men of War: Vietnam (2011)
  - Vietnam '65 (2017) (Enhanced port of Men of War: Vietnam content into Men of War: Assault Squad 2)
  - Vietnam at War (2022) (Mod for MoW: AS 2)

== Real-time strategy games ==
- Platoon (2002 video game) (2002)
- Rise of Nations: Thrones and Patriots (2004) (Expansion)
- War Over Vietnam (2004)
- Tactical Heroes 2: Platoons (2018)
- Radio Commander (2019)
- The 'Nam: Vietnam Combat Operations (2020) (Free standalone mod for Command & Conquer: Tiberian Sun)
- Leave No One Behind: Ia Drang (2022)

== Turn-based tactics ==
- SOG: Vietnam (2025)

== Wargame (video games) ==
=== Talonsoft's The Operational Art of War series ===
Early series titles between 1998 and 2000 published by Talonsoft. TOAW III (2006) was the last Talonsoft-developed series title.

- Norm Koger's The Operational Art of War Vol 1: 1939-1955 - Battle Pack I Scenario Add-on Disk (1999) (Expansion for 1st TOAW (1999) title)
- The Operational Art of War II: Modern Battles 1956–2000 (1999)
  - The Operational Art of War II: Flashpoint Kosovo (1999) (Expansion)
- The Operational Art of War: Century of Warfare (2000) (Collection of 1st 2 TOAW full games & expansions)
- The Operational Art of War Vol 1: 1939-1955 - Elite★Edition (2000) (Compilation of 1st full TOAW game & expansion)
- The Operational Art of War Vol 1: 1939-1955 - Wargame of the Year Edition (2000) Similar to Elite★Edition (2000) but with added scenarios)
- Norm Koger's The Operational Art of War III (2006) (First series title to be released by a different publisher, Matrix Games)
- The Operational Art of War IV (2017)

=== JTS/WDS' Squad Battles Series ===
(John Tiller Software/Wargame Design Studio's series) First 3 Vietnam War-themed Squad Battles titles were 1st published by HPS Simulations.

- Squad Battles: Vietnam (2001)
- Squad Battles: Tour of Duty (2002)
- Squad Battles: Dien Bien Phu (2009)

=== Every Single Soldier's COIN war series ===
- Vietnam '65 (2015)
- Vietnam '66 (TBA. 2025?)

=== Other wargames (video games) ===
- Conflict in Vietnam (1986) (Alt titles: Conflict in Vietnam: Your Personal Time Machine into History!, Conflict in Vietnam: The Strategic War Simulation)
- NAM (1986)
- Steel Panthers II: Modern Battles (1996)
- Modern Air Power: War Over Vietnam (2004)
- Air Assault Task Force (2006)
- Viet-Afghan (2010) (Third-party content pack for Hearts of Iron II & Arsenal of Democracy)
- Combat Actions: Vietnam (2019)
- Campaign Series Vietnam 1948-1967 (2022)

== Board games ==
Name	Year	Publisher	Description
Grunt	1971	Simulation Publications	Squad and platoon level combat.
Year of the Rat - Vietnam, 1972	1972	Simulation Publications	Simulation of the 13 weeks of the Communist Offensive in the Spring of 1972.
Hue	1973	Simulations Design Corporation	Battle of Huế
Dien Bien Phu	1973	Simulations Design Corporation	First Indochina War, 1950–1954
Patrol	1974	Simulation Publications	Man to man skirmish combat in Vietnam and other periods
Search & Destroy: Tactical Combat Vietnam 1965-1966	1975	Simulation Publications	Tactical combat
Operation Pegasus	1980	Task Force Games	A game simulating the campaign to break the siege of Khe Sanh during the Vietnam War in 1968.
Defiance: The Battle of Xuan Loc	1980	Swedish Game Production	A simulation of The Battle of Xuan Loc (11 April 1975).
No Trumpets No Drums	1982	World Wide Wargames	Operational level game simulating the whole of the United States' ground combat role (1965–1975).
Vietnam: 1965-1975	1984	Victory Games (1984); GMT Games (2021)	Battalion level game simulating the whole of Americas ground combat and politics (1965–1975).
Tet '68	1992	XTR Corp	A simulation of the 1968 Tet Offensive in Vietnam.
Winged Horse: Campaigns in Vietnam, 1965-66	2006	Decision Games	A simulation of the critical fighting that marked the first months after massive conventional US intervention into conflict. An expansion was also produced to cover the war up to 1975.
Snoopy's Nose & Iron Triangle	2013	Decision Games	Two operational scenarios in Modern War #7 that simulated the campaign along a portion of the Mekong River in 1967 and the first large U.S. operation that attempted to eliminate the VC stronghold consisting of the infamous Cu Chi Tunnels.
In Country	2013	Decision Games	A strategic simulation of the entire war in Strategy & Tactics #281 that covers the land and air campaign within South Vietnam.
Fire in the Lake	2014	GMT Games	One to four players represent the VC, ARVN, NVA and US forces in a card driven game system that handles insurgency and counter insurgency activities.
LZ Albany	2016	Decision Games	A tactical simulation of the firefight known as LZ Albany in Modern War #24 that covers the VC's ambush of U.S. air cav infantry in 1965.
Combat Veteran	2017	Decision Games	A man on man tactical scenario of the firefight at the rice paddy angle in May 1967 in Modern War #31 that simulates Charlie Company of 4/47 (9th Infantry) going up against Viet Cong bunkers hidden in a jungle treeline.
Front Towards Enemy	2019	Multi-Man Publishing	Tactical combat at the scale of 50 meters per hex and five minutes per turn. Units represent fire teams of 1-4 men, heavy weapon sections, leaders, vehicles, and helicopters.
Rambo: The Board Game	2020	Everything Epic Games	
Purple Haze	2023	Phalanx Games	
