= Caverns of Khafka =

1983 video game

- Publishers: Cosmi; Ariolasoft; U.S. Gold
- Designers: Atari 8-bit Robert T. Bonifacio; Commodore 64; Paul Norman
- Platforms: Atari 8-bit, Commodore 64
- Release: 1983: Atari 8-bit 1984: C64
- Genre: Platform

Caverns of Khafka refers to either of two platform video games published by Cosmi. In both game versions the player takes control of a treasure hunter in search for the fabled treasure of Pharaoh Khafka. The first game was created by Robert T. Bonifacio and released in 1983 for Atari 8-bit computers. Subsequently, a different game with the same title and overall theme was created by Paul Norman and released for the Commodore 64 in 1984.

== Atari 8-bit version (1983) ==
=== Gameplay ===
Atari 8-bit version

Caverns of Khafka sets the player in the shoes of a treasure hunter exploring the underground Egyptian tomb. The tomb's caverns are littered with treasure which the player must collect in order to move on to the next level. There are four levels and in each one the player must navigate moving platforms, ladders, acid baths and other obstacles. Later levels introduce killer bats, rolling boulders or darts flying through the caverns.

The player starts the first level with five lives and must collect 40 pieces of treasure to proceed. For every 20 pieces of treasure an extra life is awarded and there is a short period of invincibility for every 10 pieces of treasure.

=== Development ===
After finishing his first game for Cosmi, Aztec Challenge, Robert T. Bonifacio was asked if he could do some games for some box art that had already been created that the company didn't want to waste. Caverns of Khafka was based on "some box art that looked like something from an Indiana Jones movie complete with the big boulder rolling after the guy."

=== Reception ===
Personal Computer Games in a 1984 review concluded: "The graphics and sound on Khafka aren't quite up to the standard of some platform games currently on the market [...] However, the game is very playable once you get the hang of using the joystick".

== Commodore 64 version (1984) ==
As with Aztec Challenge, Paul Norman's C64 version of Caverns of Khafka shared the name and basic concept of Robert T. Bonifacio's Atari 8-bit version (which was credited as such), but was otherwise a significantly different game in design and implementation terms.

In late 1984, Computer and Video Games magazine gave a very positive response to the C64 version, stating that although the graphics were similar to Norman's Forbidden Forest they were "impressive" and that the C64's capabilities were well used and the game was "certainly worth the money".
