= Defcon (disambiguation) =

In the United States, DEFCON is a defense alert state (numbered 1–5) used by the Armed Forces.

In the United Kingdom, DEFCON refers to numbered defence contract conditions issued by the Ministry of Defence.

Defcon, or variants, may also refer to:

== People ==
- Defconn (born 1977), South Korean rapper and comedian
- Defconn Girl (born 1990), South Korean singer also known as Fat Cat

== Entertainment ==
=== Games ===
- WarGames: Defcon 1, a 1997 PlayStation 1 and PC arcade-shooter (PS1)/real-time strategy (PC) game very loosely set 20 years after the events of the film.
- DEFCON (video game), a 2006 real-time strategy game
- Defcon 5 (1987 video game), an SDI Simulation game by Cosmi Corporation
- Defcon 5 (1995 video game), a first-person shooter video game developed by Millennium Interactive Ltd

=== Media ===
- DEF CON Radio, a channel on SomaFM, which provides the music for the annual DEF CON hacker convention
- Defcon (album), a 1991 industrial album by Wumpscut
- Def-Con 4, a 1985 post-apocalyptic film

== Associations ==
- DEF CON, a hacker convention held annually since 1993
- Defqon.1 Festival, an electronic music festival founded in 2003
- Campaign to Defend the Constitution or DefCon, an American organization for church and state separation

== See also ==
- Def (disambiguation)
