= SEAL Team =

SEAL Team can refer to:

- A component of the United States Navy SEALs, a special operations force (e.g.: Team 1, Team 2, etc.)
  - SEAL Team Six, a Tier One unit
- A component of Naval Special Warfare Command (Thailand)
- SEAL Team (TV series), an American television series on CBS
- SEAL Team (video game), an Electronic Arts video game for MS-DOS based on US Navy SEALs
- Seal Team (film), a 2021 animated film
