= Defcon 5 (1987 video game) =

1987 computer wargame

- Developer: Paul Norman
- Publisher: Cosmi Corporation
- Platforms: Commodore 64, Amiga, MS-DOS
- Release: WW: 1987
- Genre: Wargame
- Modes: Single player, multiplayer

Defcon 5 is computer wargame created by Paul Norman and published by Cosmi. It was released for the Commodore 64, in 1987 then converted to the Amiga and MS-DOS.

== Gameplay ==
Defcon 5 is a game which is set during the Cold War era.

== Reception ==
The Palm Beach Post said that Defcon 5 for DOS seemed realistic but was "absurdly difficult". Ahoy!'s AmigaUser stated that "Defcon 5 strikes a pleasing balance between strategy and action". ACE thought the game was "one of the less impressive offerings in the current Cosmi range"; despite the "sharp digitised graphics", the magazine said that Defcon 5 would "fall short in the playability stakes".

In 1996, Computer Gaming World declared Defcon 5 the 2nd-worst computer game ever released.
