= Made man (disambiguation) =

Made man is a fully initiated member of the Mafia.

Made man may refer to:

- Made Man (video game), a 2006 third-person shooter video game
- Made Man (album), a 1999 album by rapper Silkk the Shocker

== See also ==
- Made Men (film), a 1999 film by Louis Morneau
