= Elite Warriors: Vietnam =

2005 PC video game

- Developer: nFusion
- Publisher: Bold Games
- Platform: Windows
- Release: NA: March 25, 2005; FRA: April 24, 2007
- Genre: Tactical shooter
- Mode: Single-player

Elite Warriors: Vietnam is a 2005 squad-based first-person/third-person shooter video game developed by American studio nFusion and published by Bold Games for Microsoft Windows.

The game simulates the "black ops" special operations of the classified MACV-SOG formations during Vietnam War. It was developed in cooperation with MACV-SOG veteran John L. Plaster.

== Gameplay ==
Elite Warriors: Vietnam merges elements of tactical simulation, squad-based role-playing, and action-oriented shooting within a cohesive framework. Players assume command of a four-man SOG (Studies and Observations Group) squad drawn from a cadre of approximately thirty specialists such as medics, scouts, and demolitions experts each distinguished by a unique set of abilities in areas like stealth, fieldcraft, weaponry, and medicine. Before operational deployment, teams are outfitted with an arsenal of over twenty authentic Vietnam-era weapons and supporting items, reflecting input from former SOG veteran and author Major John L. Plaster. Mission planning takes place on a simplified topographical map featuring key points such as objectives, resupply drops, insertion zones, and extraction sites. Movement pace, ranging from cautious to rapid, must be chosen judiciously, as it impacts the probability of enemy detection inland.

Random events in transit, including sprained ankles, inclement weather, or surprise patrol encounters introduce unpredictability and strategic tension, the engagements shift smoothly into action segments playable in either third or first-person perspectives, and it's featuring stealth mechanics such as crawling, ambush initiation, and squad-level control via a radial menu or an RTS style overhead command interface. Progression between missions enables training to enhance operatives’ attributes and the awarding of medals that yield performance bonuses, resulting in an RPG-like progression system. Despite these layered systems, critics have described the planning phase as superficial (often default waypoints suffice) and have noted inconsistent shooting mechanics, repetitive jungle environments, and occasional AI deficiencies that diminish the experience.

== Plot ==
The narrative foundation of Elite Warriors: Vietnam draws directly from the real-world covert operations of MACV-SOG during the Vietnam War, informed by consultation with Major John L. Plaster, a veteran of those missions and gameplay scenarios replicate authentic mission types, such as rescuing downed pilots, ambushing enemy convoys, seizing intelligence-bearing prisoners, targeting locations for air strikes, and directing fire support deep within hostile territories. Although, the game incorporates factual loading screen snippets and mission briefings that lend historical context, it lacks a narrative thread or character development: the experience unfolds as sequential combat operations devoid of interpersonal arcs or evolving stakes. Review commentary emphasizes that the game substitutes story with tactical immersion, reducing its substance to a series of procedurally linked skirmishes rather than a cohesive, plot-driven journey.

== Reception ==
Reception

Aggregate score
| Aggregator | Score |
|---|---|
| Metacritic | 46/100 |

Review scores
| Publication | Score |
|---|---|
| Computer Games Magazine | 2.5/5 |
| Computer Gaming World | 1.5/5 |
| GameSpot | 5/10 |
| GameSpy | 2.5/5 |
| GameZone | 6.3/10 |
| IGN | 5/10 |
| Jeuxvideo.com | 8/20 |
| PC Gamer (US) | 22% |
| X-Play | 2/5 |

Elite Warriors: Vietnam received "generally unfavorable reviews" according to the review aggregation website Metacritic.

Erik Wolpaw of GameSpot criticized the game's lack of variety in its level design and gameplay. Jason D'Aprile of X-Play praised the game for its authenticity and sound design but criticized it for its mediocre graphics, AI, and level design. Michael Lafferty of GameZone was slightly more positive in his reception of the game, praising its environmental design but criticizing its technical issues.
