= Platoon (2002 video game) =

Real-time strategy video game

- Monte Cristo cover art
- Developer: Digital Reality
- Publishers: EU: Monte Cristo; NA: Strategy First
- Platform: Microsoft Windows
- Release: NA: November 19, 2002; EU: November 21, 2002
- Genre: Real-time strategy

Platoon is a real-time strategy video game developed by Digital Reality and published by Monte Cristo for the PC Windows in 2002. It was also published by Strategy First as Platoon: The 1st Airborne Cavalry Division in Vietnam. Platoon is the second video game adaptation of the 1986 war film of the same title, following the 1988 game by Ocean Software. Despite it being marketed as "the first strategy game about the Vietnam War", the first such game was actually SSI's 1986 Nam.

== Plot ==
The game begins with a newly promoted U.S. Army sergeant who has been ordered to lead an infantry squad in the Vietnam War.

Platoon is a mission-based tactical combat game taking place in the Vietnam Conflict. Terrain, vehicles and soldiers are all modeled and authentic, right down to the pockets on the uniforms and the types of plants and grass. The terrain affects the line of sight, and the surface and weather impose limits of the characters. The missions themselves are based on real missions undertaken during the Vietnam war. The players can group up to 30 men, including engineers and commanders.

== Reception ==
Reception

Aggregate score
Aggregator	Score
Metacritic	49/100

Review scores
Publication	Score
Computer Gaming World	1/5
GameSpot	6.7/10
GameZone	6.5/10
IGN	6/10
PC Gamer (UK)	57%
PC Gamer (US)	30%
PC Zone	45%
X-Play	2/5

The game received "generally unfavorable reviews" according to the review aggregation website Metacritic. IGN's Dan Adams said: "If you're looking for something akin to this, you could try out Soldiers of Anarchy, which is great except for the pathfinding (which you can pray they fix) or even go back to the good old days and pick up one of the Myth series or even Commandos 2. But don't waste you're [sic] money here".
