= Operation: Vietnam =

2007 video game

- Developer: Coyote Developments Ltd
- Publishers: NA/EU: Majesco; AU: Eidos Interactive
- Platform: Nintendo DS
- Release: NA: August 13, 2007; AU: October 25, 2007; EU: November 2, 2007
- Genre: Tactical shooter
- Mode: Single-player

Operation: Vietnam is a tactical top down shooter developed by Coyote Developments Ltd and published by Majesco and Eidos Interactive for Nintendo DS in 2007.

== Reception ==
Reception

Aggregate score
Aggregator	Score
Metacritic	65/100

Review scores
Publication	Score
Eurogamer	4/10
GameRevolution	B−
GamesMaster	81%
GameSpot	5.5/10
GameZone	6.5/10
IGN	5.5/10
NGamer	70%
Nintendo Power	8/10
Pocket Gamer	4/5
VideoGamer.com	8/10

The game received "mixed" reviews according to the review aggregation website Metacritic.
