= Line of Sight: Vietnam =

2003 video game

- Developer: NFusion
- Publishers: Infogrames Interactive (United States); Atari Europe (Internationally)
- Platform: Microsoft Windows
- Release: NA: March 5, 2003; PAL: July 18, 2003
- Genre: Tactical shooter
- Modes: Single-player, multiplayer

Line of Sight: Vietnam is a squad-based first-person shooter video game set in the Vietnam War. It was developed by American studio NFusion and published by Infogrames and Atari in 2003 for Microsoft Windows.

== Description ==
The game follows Private Chris Egan, a sniper in the US Army's 5th Special Forces based in Nha Trang during the Vietnam War. There are 12 single-player missions in the game, each with its own set of objectives that must be met in order to complete the mission. Throughout most single-player missions, the player is assisted by an AI squad member to whom commands and orders can be issued. In-game, the player can transfer to the perspective of a squad mate and play the game from their standpoint. There are two types of enemies in the game: North Vietnamese Army soldiers and Viet Cong guerillas. They are either standing guards or mobile patrols and are commonly found in groups of two or three. Missions can begin during the day or at night. In the game, there are around ten different weapons to choose from, including weapons dumped by enemy troops. The game can be played from both first-person and third-person perspectives. The player can switch between perspectives in-game.

The cooperative multiplayer over Internet cannot be played anymore as it was based on GameSpy, which has since been shut down.

== Reception ==
Reception

Aggregate score
Aggregator	Score
Metacritic	68/100

Review scores
Publication	Score
Computer Games Magazine	4/5
Computer Gaming World	1.5/5
GamesMaster	35%
GameSpot	7/10
GameZone	7.5/10
IGN	6.5/10
Jeuxvideo.com	11/20
PC Format	83%
PC Gamer (UK)	37%
PC Gamer (US)	73%

The game received "average" reviews according to the review aggregation website Metacritic.
