= Panzer Campaigns: Smolensk '41 =

1999 video game

- Series: Panzer Campaigns
- Release: 1999
- Genre: Turn based strategy

Panzer Campaigns: Smolensk '41 is a video game released in 1999 and is part of the Panzer Campaigns video game series.

== Gameplay ==
The game covers the First Battle of Smolensk at the battalion level. The full campaign map represents an area of 200x300 km (125x186 mi), divided into hexes measuring 1 km (1.6 mi). A turn represents two hours of daytime, or four hours of night. The hex size and turn length were generally maintained in the subsequent games.

== Reception ==
Reception

Review scores
Publication	Score
Computer Games Strategy Plus	4/5
CNET Gamecenter	5/10

StrategyPage, a publication whose chief editor is Jim Dunnigan, the author of the 1976 board wargame Panzergruppe Guderian, on which the computer game is loosely based, also reviewed the computer game, and gave Smolensk '41 three different ratings, depending on the audience: two stars for the general gaming public due to excessive complexity (but noting that HPS Simulations did not market the game to this public), "four plus" stars for the grognard that enjoys fine-grained control over battalion-level units in a game of this scale, but reducing this score for the user interested in more realistic command structures to four stars for the small scenarios, and just three for the grand campaign. The Wargamer review appreciated the scale of the game, and its interface, which brought HPS games on par with those from its TalonSoft competitor Campaign series. In the second review, they said the game "has very good potential to be one of the best computer wargames yet made, for both grognards, and casual wargamers alike."

The editors of Computer Games Strategy Plus named Smolensk '41 the best wargame of 1999 and called it a solid and playable game for wargamers.
