= Forbidden Forest (video game) =

1983 video game

- C64 disk release
- Developer: Cosmi
- Publisher: Cosmi
- Designer: Paul Norman
- Programmers: Paul Norman (C64); Vance Kozik (Atari)
- Platforms: Commodore 64, Atari 8-bit
- Release: 1983
- Genre: Action
- Mode: Single-player

Forbidden Forest is a game designed by Paul Norman, published by Cosmi Corporation in 1983 for the Commodore 64 and Atari 8-bit computers.

== Gameplay ==
Gameplay screenshot (Atari 8-bit)

In this game the player controls an archer, armed with a bow and a limit of four quivers of arrows per level. The aim is to move through a forest setting while eliminating various monsters, including giant spiders, bees, mutated frogs, dragons, wizards and snakes, with the final enemy being the Demogorgon. The monsters were inspired by the films Night of the Demon, Jason and the Argonauts, and Mysterious Island. The game has four levels of difficulty (Innocent, Trooper, Daredevil and Crazy) which determine the number and speed of the monsters.

This is one of the earliest video games to use animated blood. It also features parallax scrolling and a day/night cycle.

== Development ==
Paul Norman began working for a small company named Synchro. It was a small software store creating Apple II, VIC-20 and Commodore 64 software. Paul rented a vehicle and drove the 30 miles to apply for an advertised position with a game he had created for the VIC-20. Paul landed the position and began working on Forbidden Forest as a way of learning 6502 programming. The company that he was working for was going out of business and representatives from the software company Cosmi arrived to purchase office furniture. They saw Paul working on Forbidden Forest and hired him on the spot.

== Reception ==
Reception

Review score
Publication	Score
Computer and Video Games	31/40

The game was positively received by the reviewer of Your Commodore who gave it a score of 4/5, saying that it was "among my top five favourites". Although the graphics were not "totally first class" the game was said to be "amazing."

In the first issue of Zzap!64 the game was placed 21st in a list of the top 64 games list. Zzap!64 also favourably reviewed a budget re-release of Forbidden Forest. Although noting that the graphics were blocky they praised the game's atmosphere, soundtrack and gameplay. It was given an overall score of 82%.

== Legacy ==
A sequel, Beyond the Forbidden Forest, was released in 1985. This was billed as "OmniDimension 4D", as the game is a third-person shooter that allows the archer to move (and shoot) in and out of the foreground, with scenery changing from day to night in order to represent time passing. Again, the object is to eliminate monsters (giant scorpions, worms and mosquitos etc.) while wandering the forest, earning a golden arrow for each kill; after earning four arrows, the archer may enter the underworld to face bats, a Hydra and finally the Demogorgon itself.

A further sequel, Forbidden Forest (informally, Forbidden Forest 3), was released for Microsoft Windows in 2003, co-developed with Webfoot Technologies. This is a 3D adventure in which the aim is to explore an environment while searching for coins, collecting power-ups and facing recreations of villains from the first game. The release included the original Commodore 64 games.

In 1985 New Generation Software released the Commodore 64 game Amazon Warrior. Written by Geoff Sumner, the game is a Forbidden Forest clone set in the jungle. Instead of a bow, the main character - the titular amazon warrior - is armed with a blowgun. Gameplay and controls are almost identical to Forbidden Forest, even though the game quality is lower and the game did not achieve a similar level of praise from gaming magazines.
