= The President Is Missing (video game) =

1988 video game

- North American cover art
- Developer(s): Cosmi
- Publisher(s): Cosmi
- Programmer(s): Paul Norman
- Composer(s): Barry Leitch
- Platform(s): Commodore 64
- Release: NA: 1988; EU: 1988
- Genre(s): Action w/ crime investigation elements
- Mode(s): Single player

The President Is Missing is a computer simulation game written by Paul Norman for the Commodore 64 and published by Cosmi in 1988. The game came with an audio cassette with different recordings and an anonymous note signed by "Saduj" (Judas in reverse).

== Plot ==
In the game, which is set in 1996, the President of the United States is attending an anti-terror summit in Europe with ten Western European leaders. Terrorists attack the summit, knocking out the attendees and security personnel with sleeping gas. The terrorists then kidnap the president and the other leaders and hold them hostage. The terrorists leave an audiotape behind, stating that they are Islamic and make numerous demands in exchange for safe release of the hostages.

The player assumes the role of the special investigator, who must find the President and the rest of the hostages. The investigator works from his computer terminal, which has access to dossiers of many different individuals such as known terrorists and members of the Cabinet. The investigator also has eight special agents, whom he can send out to interview people or find out information. The agents' reports are then stored on the computer.

The audiotape that comes with the game contains news reports, recorded messages by the President of the United States and the President of France while in captivity, intercepted telephone calls, an interview with the First Lady, and intercepts of Morse code messages.

The game includes tools to decipher Morse code messages and other coded clues.

If the player learned where a hostage or hostages were being held, he could send a special strike team to a particular address. The strike team would then report its findings, which could include other clues.

The computer terminal also has two secret files, one by the CIA and one by the National Security Council, that could not be accessed without prior authorization. The player, however, could attempt to hack into the files.

=== Resolution ===
As the game went on, it was clear that there was a much wider conspiracy going on. The player had to figure it out. As a game, The President Is Missing never ended. The game includes a note telling the player that once they unraveled the game's complex plot, they are to write a report and summarize all of the evidence and send it to Cosmi. In turn, the company would respond to the player.

== Reception ==
Computer Gaming World applauded The President Is Missing's premise, plot, and graphics, but criticized its execution. The magazine concluded, "the game has simply too much dead-time to be truly exciting or for players to maintain their initial enthusiasm."
