= The Hell in Vietnam =

2007 video game

- Developer(s): City Interactive
- Publisher(s): City Interactive
- Platform(s): Microsoft Windows
- Release: EU: June 1, 2007; AU: February 1, 2008
- Genre(s): First-person shooter
- Mode(s): Single-player

The Hell in Vietnam is a Vietnam War-oriented first-person shooter video game developed and published by Polish studio City Interactive for Microsoft Windows on June 1, 2007.

== Gameplay ==
The Hell in Vietnam is a first-person shooter that tasks the player with completing various objectives to progress further in the game. The player controls 1st Lieutenant Thomas "Deadeye" Coburn, an American soldier in the Vietnam War. The plot follows Coburn's work in his unit, which is described in diary entries between missions. These diary notes give context to the 8 individual missions in the game. The missions generally follow a similar setup, with the player being required to kill Vietcong soldiers and then destroy an objective like an anti-aircraft gun or eliminating a Vietnamese sniper. Komputer Świat GRY's Adam Kaczmarek noted that the game took them 92 minutes to complete.

== Reception ==
Komputer Świat GRY's Adam Kaczmarek said that The Hell in Vietnam became a parody of itself, and that its low-budget gameplay shows "imperfections at every step." GameZone Germany's Michael Sosinka said that the game's low 20 asking price was a "waste of money" and recommended the older Vietcong 2 instead.
