= Elite Forces WWII: Normandy =

2001 video game

- Developers: Third Law Interactive; 3LV Games
- Publisher: ValuSoft
- Platform: Windows
- Release: February 2001
- Genre: First Person Shooter

Elite Forces WWII: Normandy is a 2001 video game from ValuSoft.

== Gameplay ==
WWII: Normandy is a first-person shooter that places players in the role of a paratrooper from the 101st Airborne Division, dropped behind enemy lines near Utah Beach during the D-Day invasion. The game attempts to capture the chaos and isolation of the mission, where scattered troops must form improvised units to clear paths for landing forces and block enemy reinforcements. Gameplay unfolds across ten short levels, with a few bonus maps available via patch. Missions are brief and can be completed in roughly three hours on standard difficulty. Players face off against German soldiers. The arsenal is minimal—just a machete, pistol, rifle, machine gun, bazooka, grenades, and land mines. Land mines a strategic element, allowing players to eliminate groups of enemies with careful placement.

== Development ==
Elite Forces WWII: Normandy uses the same engine as Kiss: Psycho Circus: The Nightmare Child.

== Reception ==
Reception

Review scores
Publication	Score
GameSpot	4.3/10
Jeuxvideo.com	6/20
The Atlanta Constitution	B-

GameSpot gave Elite Forces WWII: Normandy a score of 4.3 out of 10, stating: "If you want to relive the Normandy invasion, take that $20 and use it toward the purchase of the Saving Private Ryan DVD. Besides, the film plays about as long as it'll take you to complete WWII Normandy".

Elite Forces WWII: Normandy sold more than 45,000 units in the United States.
