= Rush'n Attack: Ex-Patriot =

2011 video game

- Developer: Vatra Games
- Publisher: Konami
- Engine: Unreal Engine 3
- Platforms: PlayStation 3, Xbox 360
- Release: PlayStation 3: NA: March 29, 2011; PAL: April 13, 2011; Xbox 360; March 30, 2011
- Genre: Platform
- Mode: Single-player

Rush'n Attack: Ex-Patriot is a 2011 action-platform video game developed by Vatra Games and published by Konami. It is a sequel to the 1985 game Rush'n Attack. The game follows Sergeant Sid Morrow, an American special agent sent with his team to recover a prisoner from a secret Russian military base.

== Gameplay ==
The player primarily attacks with a knife, with rewards for kills from behind and from shadows.

Rush'n Attack: Ex-Patriot is inspired by many of the action gameplay elements from the original Rush'n Attack. The game is played from a 2.5D perspective, with players being able to move horizontally and vertically. The game has several new features over its predecessor such as non-linear levels, stealth-based combat, attack combos and usable equipment such as gas masks and night vision goggles. The game spans three large levels that are traversed both horizontally and vertically.

The player character is initially armed only with a knife, but can pick up other temporary-use weaponry such as grenades, rifles and rocket launchers. The game sometimes requires the player character to use stealth to avoid enemy units or security cameras. Triggering any alarm will result in nearby enemies rushing to the source of the alarm trigger. Alarms can be triggered by making too much noise or being noticed by one of the security cameras within the game's setting. In a departure from Rush'n Attack, the player character is given a health bar instead of the original one hit death.

Shank combos are the primary way in which players can earn points. The attacks are based on systema, a Russian style of fighting. As the character progresses new combos can be unlocked. Chaining combos together will result in the player gaining more points earned. The character can also dispatch enemies using stealth tactics. Stealth kills reward the player with a higher score and they can be performed by hiding in dark areas or by entering dark doorways, then exiting for the kill as an enemy passes.

== Plot ==
Rush'n Attack: Ex-Patriot takes place fifteen years after the Cold War struggle between Russia and the United States. During a flashback the player watches as the Central Intelligence Agency (CIA) learns that the Russians have discovered a previously unknown material called Ulyssium that could be used to create the world's most powerful nuclear missiles. To combat the threat they form Harvest, a secret CIA task force designed to investigate and infiltrate the Soviet weapons program. The Cold War ends without confrontation, and the team is extracted from Russia, save for one member. Fifteen years later new Harvest operative Sgt. Sid Morrow, callsign Wolf Spider, is sent with a team on Operation: Angel Tear to retrieve original Harvest team member Rory Gibson, who had been abandoned in Russia during the extraction.

Having received intelligence that the missile program may have been re-initiated, the CIA also tasks Wolf Spider with re-evaluating the missile threat, sabotaging it if necessary.

== Development ==
Rush'n Attack: Ex-Patriot was revealed by Konami at Konami Gamers Night in April 2010. It is the sequel to Rush'n Attack, developed by Vatra Games and published by Konami and is powered by Epic Games' Unreal Engine 3. Ex-Patriot associate producer James Wong said that the team wanted to retain the fun and quick pick up and play nature of the original game, but with more depth. The scores are posted to online leaderboards and estimated gameplay time is 6-8 hours.

== Reception ==
Reception

Aggregate score
Aggregator	Score	
Aggregator	PS3	Xbox 360
Metacritic	47/100	51/100

Review scores
Publication	Score	
Publication	PS3	Xbox 360
Eurogamer	N/A	8/10
Game Informer	6/10	6/10
Gamekult	N/A	5/10
GamesMaster	40%	N/A
GamesRadar+	1.5/5	1.5/5
GamesTM	N/A	4/10
IGN	4/10	4/10
Joystiq	N/A	1/5
Official Xbox Magazine (US)	N/A	5.5/10
PlayStation: The Official Magazine	4/10	N/A

Prior to its release, Rush'n Attack: Ex-Patriot drew comparisons to Shadow Complex and Bionic Commando Rearmed by the media. On release, the Xbox 360 version received "mixed" reviews, while the PlayStation 3 version received "generally unfavorable reviews", according to the review aggregation website Metacritic.

Arthur Gies of IGN was disappointed with the game, criticizing its gameplay, graphics, and level design. Several reviewers said that the game attempts the metroidvania formula of open exploration, but fails due to its linearity.

Sales data during the game's first week revealed that only 652 players had scores on the game's leaderboard, the lowest opening week for any game in the month of March 2011. In contrast the next highest game, Strania, had 3,250 players posted to their leaderboards, while the highest opener, Beyond Good & Evil HD, posted 41,629 players. (Note: Sales data was driven from the game's leaderboards, which post scores during specific events in Xbox Live Arcade games. Thus actual sales are estimated.)
