= Special Forces (video game) =

1992 video game

- Developer: Sleepless Knights
- Publisher: MicroProse
- Director: James Hawkins
- Producer: Steve Perry
- Designer: Jim Bambra
- Programmers: Mark Fisher; Keith Jackson
- Artist: Anthony Rosbottom
- Writer: Rob Davies
- Platforms: Amiga, Atari ST, MS-DOS
- Release: 1992
- Genres: Tactical shooter, stealth
- Mode: Single-player

Special Forces is a tactical shooter video game developed by Sleepless Knights and published by MicroProse in 1992 for the Amiga, Atari ST, and MS-DOS. A team of special operatives are to infiltrate enemy territory to complete various objectives. It is a sequel to Airborne Ranger.

== Gameplay ==
Special Forces lets the player select a team of four from a squad of eight operatives. Once a mission is selected in one of the four regions (temperate zone, arctic, desert and jungle - daytime and nighttime variants) the player is briefed. Objectives include hostage rescues, destroying specific objects and reconnaissance missions.

The game displays a top-down view of a part of the mission area in various configurations (one viewport per soldier up to four views at the same time in split-screen mode). The player also has access to a strategic battle map with enemy locations visible (there is no fog of war in the game).

== See also ==
- United States Army Special Forces in popular culture
