= Gunboat (video game) =

1990 video game

- Developers: Accolade (DOS); The Code Monkeys (CPC, Spectrum, T-16); Black Hole Software (Amiga)
- Publisher: Accolade
- Producer: Sam Nelson
- Designer: Tom Loughry
- Artists: Roseann Mitchell; Tom Loughry
- Composers: Gary Eskow; Russell Shiffer
- Platforms: MS-DOS, Amstrad CPC, ZX Spectrum, Amiga, TurboGrafx-16
- Release: 1990; 1991 (Amiga); 1992 (T-16)
- Genre: Vehicle simulation
- Mode: Single-player

Gunboat is a simulation video game developed and released by Accolade in 1990 for MS-DOS. Ports were released for the Amstrad CPC, ZX Spectrum, Amiga and TurboGrafx-16. It is a combat simulator of a Patrol Boat, River (PBR).

== Gameplay ==
Gunboat begins in Vietnam during the Vietnam War. When the player earns a second lieutenant's bar, the game moves on to fighting drug kingpins in Colombia. After being promoted to lieutenant commander, the player patrols the Panama Canal Zone.

The player uses the keyboard, the function keys, and the joystick to move through stations aboard the patrol boat, including the pilot, stern gunner, and midship gunner. The pilot controls the searchlights and the speed of the boat, identify targets for the gunners, and command the crew to open fire or cease fire.

Each weapon station has a specific gun type: M2 Heavy MG, M134 Gatling Gun, Mk19 Automatic Grenade Launcher, etc. Each of the weapon is better for certain type of targets, which in turn sometimes requires maneuvering the boat in respective angle of that weapon to the target.

== Reception ==
Brad Bombardiere reviewed the game for Computer Gaming World, and stated that "for those who have tired of their flight or tank simulators, make a splash with Gunboat, a high speed combat "rollercoaster" ride offering both authenticity and good old shoot-'em-up fun".

Gunboat was rated 9/10 in VideoGames & Computer Entertainment. The PC version of the game received 4 out of 5 stars in Dragon, while the Amiga version of the game received 3 out of 5 stars. A 1992 Computer Gaming World survey of wargames with modern settings gave the game three stars out of five, and a 1994 survey gave it two-plus stars.

== See also ==
- Battlefield Vietnam
- SEAL Team
