= Breachers VR =

2023 video game

- Game logo
- Developer: Triangle Factory
- Publisher: Triangle Factory
- Engine: Unity (game engine)
- Platforms: Meta Quest 3S; PICO 4; Meta Quest 2; Microsoft Windows; PSVR; Meta Quest 3
- Release: PICO 4, Quest 2, Windows; April 13, 2023; PlayStation 5; December 20, 2023
- Genre: Tactical shooter
- Mode: Multiplayer

Breachers VR is a 2023 VR Tactical Shooter game developed and published by Triangle Factory. It's a competitive 5v5 shooter similar to Counter-Strike: Global Offensive and Tom Clancy's Rainbow Six Siege.

== Gameplay ==
Gameplay screenshot

Breachers VR is a team-based tactical shooter featuring gameplay very similar to the Counter-Strike and Rainbow Six series. Players are divided into five-player teams of Attackers and Defenders.

In the game's basic game mode, Bomb Defuse, the Defenders must protect a time bomb until its detonation, while the Attackers must defuse the bomb to prevent it from being detonated. Like in Counter-Strike, each round players are given in-game money to purchase variety of weapons and equipment.
