= Deaf (disambiguation) =

Deaf may refer to:

- Deafness, a term with varying meanings in cultural and medical contexts:
  - Deaf culture, the set of beliefs and traditions of communities that are influenced by deafness and which use sign languages as the main means of communication
  - Hearing loss, a partial or total inability to hear
- Deaf (album), the debut album from You've Got Foetus on Your Breath
- Deaf (2025 film), a Spanish film by Eva Libertad

== See also ==
- Def (disambiguation)
