= Vietnam: 1965–1975 =

1984 Vietnam War board wargame

Vietnam: 1965–1975 is a detailed military and political board wargame that simulates the last decade of the Vietnam War. Published by Victory Games in 1984 less than a decade after the end of the war, the game faced criticism from some American observers for capitalizing on a topic that was still painful to many Americans. As a game it has received positive reviews and was back in print as of 2022 as a second edition by GMT Games.

== Description ==
Vietnam: 1965–1975 is a two-player board wargame in which one player controls American and South Vietnamese forces, while the other controls North Vietnamese and Vietcong forces. As the Washington Post noted, the game has both military and political objectives.

Rules cover topics like "Search and Destroy Operations," "Airmobility," "Pacification" and "Strategic Bombing." With a 48-page rulebook, 780 counters, three large 22" x 34" hex grid maps and an estimated playing time of 400 hours, the game has been characterized as very complex.

=== Gameplay ===
Unlike traditional wargames that use a simple alternating system of movement and attack, Vietnam uses a more complex game system in which the player must declare a type of operation: Search & Destroy, Holding, Patrol, Clear and Secure, or Strategic movement. Then the players go through a series of phases including targeting, movement, alert, combat, retreat, and pursuit, which are repeated until the operation ends.

=== Political ramifications ===
The American player must also contend with the effects that military actions, victories and defeats have on morale in both in the United States and South Vietnam. As game designer Nick Karp explained, "Every action in the game has a corresponding morale effect in the U.S. and in South Vietnam: bombing the North, sending new troops, high casualty levels. The U.S. has to balance military needs with the ability of the U.S. to cater to them." Although American incursions into Laos and Cambodia are allowed, despite the stiff penalty in morale, no ground incursions into North Vietnam are allowed.

=== Scenarios ===
The game includes nine shorter scenarios covering various aspects of the war. There is also a long scenario covering the war from the Tet Offensive in 1968 to the Fall of Saigon in 1975, and a long campaign game covering the war from 1965 to 1975.

=== Victory conditions ===
The only condition for victory is the state of the South Vietnamese government. If the government falls, then the North Vietnamese player wins. If the government is still standing at the end of the game, the American player is the winner.

== Publication history ==
While a senior at Princeton University in 1983, Nick Karp — who had already designed several board wargames including Star Trader — submitted a proposal to the classics department to create a thesis in the form of a board game that would simulate the 49 BCE civil war between Julius Caesar and Pompey the Great. Although Karp's proposal was rejected, he came to the notice of Victory Games, who commissioned him to create a game about the Vietnam War, which had ended less than ten years before. Karp spent 18 months researching the war, reading the Pentagon Papers and first-hand accounts, as well as interviewing veterans. Karp then designed the game to give players new insight into the war, saying, "The war desperately needs people to look at it to examine how it happened, what went wrong."

Vietnam: 1965–1975 was published by Victory Games in 1984; demand for the game was high, and the company shipped 25,000 copies in the first month. Given that the Vietnam War had begun during the French occupation of the country, this game also proved very popular in France — the French magazine Casus Belli called it "undoubtedly one of the best wargames created and its success, in the USA as in France, attests to that."

In 2022, GMT Games acquired the rights to the game and published a second edition with revised rules and upgraded components.

== Reception ==
With feelings in the United States still running high about the Vietnam War, the game was criticized for being made too soon after the war when American families still grieved from the losses. As Brian Train and Volko Ruhnke noted about the game in Chess, Go, and Vietnam: Gaming Modern Insurgency (2016), "As late as the 1990s, US observers questioned the perceived insensitivity in making and playing a game about events that hurt so many American families so deeply." However, Train and Ruhnke found that in the 21st century, those attitudes had softened, writing, "Yet now, gaming Vietnam appears increasingly accepted."

In Issue 22 of the French games magazine Casus Belli, Hervé Hatt called the game "a very ambitious title, both in terms of its theme and for the great delight of an American public who now have enough perspective to dissect the passionate reactions of the time; and to enable them to win a campaign which had to be won, and which was lost because war is too serious a matter to be left to the military." Hatt deplored the cover art, which he called "second rate", but found the map "very beautiful, a real patchwork of exotic and abundant colors." But after examining the complex game procedure and long scenarios, Hatt warned that the game was "For those of you who are not afraid to lay out the map for many weeks, for aficionados of contemporary monster wargaming. " Hatt concluded, "It was time for wargaming to embark on the twists and turns of ideological warfare."

In Issue 50 of Casus Belli, Bruno Butaud presented an exhaustive examination of the two different philosophies in the Vietnam War: the North Vietnamese political war, and the American conventional war. Butaud warned that the problems in mastering the game are not because of its complexity: "Much more difficult to understand is its internal logic. The first games are often very painful, because this conflict in no way corresponds to the classic military situations that wargamers usually face."

== Awards ==
Vietnam: 1965–1975 won two Charles S. Roberts Awards: "Best Twentieth Century Game of 1984" and "Best Graphic Presentation in an Adventure Game 1984".

== Other reviews and commentary ==
- Line of Departure #13 (Winter 1994)
- Fire & Movement #43
- Simulations #8 (in French)
- Le Journal du Stratege #11 (in French)
- Hexagones #4 (in French)

== See also ==
- List of Vietnam War games#Board games
