= Def =

Def or DEF may refer to:

== Music ==
- Def (instrument), a Middle Eastern musical instrument
- DEF II, a British youth TV programme
- Def American, a rock and rap record label
- Def Jam Recordings, a rap record label
- Def Jux, a rap record label
- Def Leppard, a British hard rock band
- So So Def Recordings, a rap record label

== Other uses ==
- def, a keyword in Python and PostScript
- Danish EL-Federation, Danish trade union for electricians
- Delphi Economic Forum, a Greek nonprofit organization
- Design Exchange Format, or DEF
- Deutsche Emaillewaren-Fabrik, or DEF, Oskar Schindler's Enamel Factory in Kraków, Poland
- Diesel exhaust fluid, or DEF, also known as AdBlue or AUS 32
- Disarmed Enemy Forces, or DEF
- Diethylformamide, an organic solvent
- Drawing Exchange Format

== People ==
- Mos Def, an American rapper, singer and actor
- Def Jef, an American musician and rapper

== See also ==
- Defcon (disambiguation)
- Deaf (disambiguation)
