= Rush'n Attack =

1985 video game

- North American arcade flyer
- Developer: Konami
- Publisher: Konami
- Platform: Arcade: ZX Spectrum, Amstrad CPC, Atari 8-bit, BBC Micro, Commodore 64, MSX, Plus/4, Thomson, Famicom Disk System, NES, mobile phone, Xbox 360
- Release: October 1985: Arcade; JP: October 1985; EU: November 1985; NA: December 1985 ZX Spectrum; UK: 1986 MSX; EU: 1986 C64; EU: 1986; NA: December 1986 CPC; EU: 1986 Famicom Disk System; JP: April 10, 1987 NES; NA: April 1987; EU: 1989 Mobile; JP: 2006 Xbox 360; WW: May 2007
- Genres: Action, platform
- Modes: Single-player, multiplayer
- Arcade system: PlayChoice-10

Rush'n Attack, also known as Green Beret (Note: Japanese: グリーンベレー, Hepburn: Gurīn Berē) in Japan and Europe, is a 1985 action-platform video game developed and published by Konami for arcades. It was later ported to the Nintendo Entertainment System and various home computers. Its North American title is a play on the phrase "Russian attack" due to its Cold War setting. It became a critical and commercial success for arcades and home computers. It was followed by a sequel, Rush'n Attack: Ex-Patriot, in 2010.

== Gameplay ==
The players assume the roles of the United States special operations Green Berets (named Steve and Ben on the Japanese Famicom ad poster) who are infiltrating an enemy military base to save POWs from execution by firing squad. There are four stages, each ending with a special group of ambushers:

The Soviet Armed Forces that attack throughout every stage are Soldiers, Gunners, Supply Runners, Combat Specialists, Jetpack Soldiers, German Shepherds, Parachute Gunners, Gyrocopters, and Flame Throwers.

The omnipresent combat knife can be supplemented with captured arms. By eliminating certain Russian militants, the players can obtain a three-shot flamethrower, a four-shot RPG, or a three-pack of hand grenades. When the mission is accomplished, the four rescued POWs salute and the player repeats the game from the first stage on the next difficulty level. An invisible time limit kills the player.

Extra lives are given at 30,000 and 70,000, and per 70,000 up to 980,000, and survival of the fittest mode thereafter.

== Ports ==
In 1986, Ocean Software released home versions as Green Beret on their Imagine label for the ZX Spectrum, Plus/4, Commodore 64, Amstrad CPC, Atari 8-bit computers, and BBC Micro.

The Commodore 64 port was programmed by David Collier, with graphics by Steve Wahid and music by Martin Galway. The Spectrum version was programmed by Jonathan Smith.

The MSX version was released in Europe on ROM cartridge in 1986. It was developed by Stuart Ruecroft, N Ford and P Green for Konami Ltd. in the United Kingdom.

It was released in North America in December 1986 and an unrelated IBM PC version was released by Konami for the North American market with the Rush'n Attack name in 1989.

Hamster Corporation released the game as part of their Arcade Archives series for the Nintendo Switch and PlayStation 4 in November 2020.

=== Famicom Disk System and NES ===
A Family Computer Disk System version of Green Beret was released in Japan on April 10, 1987, along with a corresponding version for the Nintendo Entertainment System (as Rush'n Attack) released that month in North America, and 1989 in Europe.

The objective in the NES version was changed from rescuing prisoners to destroying a secret weapon being developed in the enemy's headquarters. A two-player simultaneous cooperative mode was introduced. The gameplay mechanics are essentially identical to the arcade version, but the Flamethrower is removed (only the Rocket Launcher and Grenades remain) and two new power-up items are introduced: a Star mark which grants invincibility and a pistol with unlimited ammo, both which are only usable for a limited period. The NES version features two additional stages that are not in the arcade game: an airport set between the Missile Base and the Harbor, where the player faces a group of rocket soldiers at the end; and a new final stage set inside the enemy's base that ends with the player using rocket launchers dropped by enemy soldiers to disarm a nuclear missile. The flamethrower corps at the end of the Warehouse stage was replaced by a paratrooper unit. The Famicom version has a few cosmetic differences with higher difficulty compared to its NES counterpart, along with underground areas in three of the levels, which are accessed via destroying specific mines that reveal ladders to the floors below.

=== Game Boy Advance ===
A conversion of the arcade version of Rush'n Attack is included in the 2002 compilation Konami Collector's Series: Arcade Advanced for the Game Boy Advance. The game features the same four stages as in the arcade version, and two extra stages unlocked via the Konami Code. A two-player versus mode has been added, which utilizes the Game Link Cable. The A button jumps instead of the D-pad.

=== Nintendo DS ===
A second portable version is included in the 2007 compilation Konami Classics Series: Arcade Hits for the Nintendo DS. Unlike the GBA version, the DS version is a direct port of the original arcade game, but includes various bonus features such as scans of the instruction cards and leaflet, as well as tips.

=== Xbox 360 ===
Rush'n Attack was released on Xbox Live Arcade for the Xbox 360 in May 2007. This version is another direct port of the arcade game, but features an optional game mode with improved graphics and a remixed soundtrack. It was developed by Digital Eclipse.

=== Konami Net DX ===
Green Beret was released for smartphones in Japan in 2006. The mobile version is a direct port of the Famicom version with a new health bar. The mobile port was re-released in China for Java phones in December 2008.

== Reception ==
Reception

Review scores
Publication	Score				
Publication	Arcade	C64	NES	PC	ZX
ACE		4/5		4/5	4/5
Crash					88%
Computer and Video Games		34/40	83%		34/40
Dragon				3.5/5	
Sinclair User					5/5
The Games Machine (UK)			81%		
Your Sinclair					9/10
Commodore User	Positive				
Computer Gamer	Positive				

Award
Publication	Award
Your Sinclair	Hot Shot

In Japan, Game Machine listed Green Beret as the third most successful table arcade unit of November 1985. In Europe, Green Beret was considered one "of the first military shoot 'em ups" on the market, and became a major hit in arcades. The home computer conversions topped the UK Gallup sales charts in June 1986, becoming one of the top four best-selling games of 1986 in the UK, and one of the year's top three best-selling Commodore 64 games. Its budget re-release later topped the UK budget sales chart in July 1989.

Green Beret was well-received by critics. Mike Roberts and Eric Doyle of Computer Gamer magazine gave the arcade game a positive review, comparing it favorably with the action film Rambo: First Blood Part II (1985) while calling it an "incredibly violent game" that is "brilliant to play". Commodore User said the arcade version is "a kind of rightwards scrolling Commando [but] much better" while praising "brilliant" graphics and sound.

Computer and Video Games reviewed the Commodore 64 and ZX Spectrum versions, calling the game "Konami's answer" to Capcom's Commando (1985) and comparing it favorably with the Rambo film series. The review said it is fast, "furious" and "terribly addictive".

The MS-DOS version of Rush'n Attack was reviewed in 1989 in Dragon magazine by Patricia Hartley and Kirk Lesser, giving 3 1/2 out of 5 stars. ACE reviewed the budget re-release of Green Beret for the Commodore 64, ZX Spectrum, and Amstrad CPC in 1989, calling it an "intelligently thought out shoot 'em up with excellent graphics". The NES version ranked 99 on IGN's top 100 NES games list.

== See also ==
- Contra
- Missing in Action
- Rush'n Attack: Ex-Patriot
