= Panzer Campaigns =

- Genres: Turn-based tactics Wargame
- Developers: John Tiller Software (1999–2021); Wargame Design Studio (2017–present)
- Publishers: HPS Simulations (1999–2010); John Tiller Software (2010–2021); Wargame Design Studio (2021–present)
- Creator: John Tiller
- Platforms: Microsoft Windows iOS; Android
- First release: Panzer Campaigns: Smolensk '41; 1999
- Latest release: Panzer Campaigns: Donbas '43; 2026

Panzer Campaigns is a series of operational level wargames originally developed by John Tiller Software, and currently by Wargame Design Studio. The games were originally published until 2010 by HPS Simulations, then self published by John Tiller Software until being bought out by Wargame Design Studio in 2021, after Tiller's death. There are currently 33 titles in the series, spanning the various fronts of World War II.

== Games ==
=== Smolensk '41 (1999) ===
Covers the First Battle of Smolensk at battalion level. The full campaign map represents an area of 200x300 km (125x186 mi), divided in hexes measuring 1 km (0.62 mi). A turn represents two hours of daytime, or four hours of night. The hex size and turn length were generally maintained in the subsequent games.

=== Normandy '44 (2000) ===
Reception

Review scores
Publication	Score
Computer Games Magazine	4/5
Computer Gaming World	4/5
PC Gamer (US)	86%
CNET Gamecenter	4/10

Covers the initial landings and subsequent breakthrough of Operation Overlord, and consequently employs a smaller scale (down to company level). The Wargamer gave it a positive review, but remarked that the Germans' ability to significantly delay the Allies in the bocage could only be reproduced by using the alternate engagement rules, which prohibit advance and assault on the same phase/turn.

The editors of Computer Games Magazine nominated Normandy '44 for their 2000 "Wargame of the Year" award.

=== Kharkov '42 (2000) ===
Reception

Review scores
Publication	Score
Computer Games Magazine	4/5
Computer Gaming World	4/5

Covers the Soviet spring offensive and the German counter-attack, Operation Frederick, during the Second Battle of Kharkov. The Wargamer review (by a former HPS collaborator) dissected the level of historical realism in the simulation, instead of the game mechanics, which were largely unchanged from the previous iterations. The review found that the terrain behind the front lines felt "barren" because non-fire support units were abstracted away, which could affect the results of a breakthrough, but that overall, the game was an "entry-level wargame", "not too challenging, with a solid, but narrowly focused research base", "a kind of interactive historical novel whose fictions are based on fact". On a side note, the reviewer noticed that the historical order of battle, taken from the publications of David Glantz, had to be adjusted by the game designers, because some duplications were found.

=== Tobruk '41 (2001) ===
Reception

Review scores
Publication	Score
Computer Games Magazine	4/5
Computer Gaming World	3/5

Covers the sequence of battles in North Africa starting with Rommel's initial breakthrough, ending with Operation Crusader. Unlike the previous games in the series, no grand campaign is included in this game, but a series of 7 longer scenarios, in addition to 50 smaller ones. A few scenarios feature explicit supply depots with limited stocks (which can be captured, as well) to more closely simulate the limited nature of resources available in desert warfare. Units can also be broken down to company-level in this game.

The Wargamer wrote in a review: "Panzer Campaigns 4: Tobruk '41 captures both the dash and the grit of the back-and-forth fighting in North Africa while maintaining a serious supply and command model."

=== Bulge '44 (2001) ===
Covers the Battle of the Bulge, which took place in the Ardennes. A Computer Games Magazine review declared it "the best Panzer Campaigns game yet", praising the combination of unit size, map size, and turn length that feel "just right". Four grand campaigns (150 turns) are included: one historical, and three alternate. The game won "Wargame of the Year" from the magazine, beating Combat Command 2: Desert Rats by Shrapnel Games, and Squad Battles: Vietnam, another John Tiller/HPS Simulations production. The game received a more reserved reception from The Wargamer. Its reviewer observed that even the optional surrender rules failed to produce the expected numbers of prisoners unless the unit was surrounded, broken (a status meaning it had lost combat cohesiveness), and assaulted. The interface was also criticized for lack of keyboard shortcuts, for modal windows that cover a large portion of the map, and for lack of a pinnable mini-map (jump map). The AI was praised however for managing an occasional surprise.

=== Korsun '44 (2002) ===
Reception

Review score
Publication	Score
Computer Gaming World	1.5/5

Captures several Soviet offensives in late 1943 and early 1944 along the Dnieper River: the Kanev airborne assault (four scenarios), the offensive near Kirovograd (two scenarios), and the Battle of the Korsun–Cherkassy Pocket proper (20 scenarios, with a 240 turns long campaign). The Wargamer reviewer was impressed by campaign notes that ship with the game, which contain "a detailed description of how unit ratings were computed and a lengthy bibliography". Several scenarios, which have fairly lopsided orders of battle, are balanced by requiring the attacker to inflict difficult to achieve kill-ratios. The review was critical of some aspects of the interface, in particular the inability to quickly skip over less relevant events during the AI turn, while not missing important events.

=== Kursk '43 (2002) ===
Reception

Review score
Publication	Score
PC Gamer (US)	87%

Attempts to portray the Battle of Kursk. Some of the criticism levied at the user interface of the series has been addressed in this game: a fast AI option, avoiding some dialog boxes, and locating units by coordinates. The Wargamer review also analyzed the historical accuracy of the game. Although there are some discrepancies between various historian's accounts of this battle (in particular with respect to losses), the book of David Glantz and Jonathan House was taken as reference. The reviewer analyzed several scenarios in-detail, and concluded that "with the exception of overrating Soviet air power early in the battle, this game is extremely accurate". Rating the level of fun in the game, he found that "scenarios with fewer than 40 turns and with relatively small numbers of units are engrossing", and suggested that players only try the larger ones afterwards. This recommendation was echoed by Computer Games Magazine. PC Gamer similarly found that "firmly grounded on prodigious research, this game is surely the definitive Kursk simulation, and one of the finest titles this prolific designer has ever given us".

=== Sicily '43 (2003) ===
Covers Operation Husky on a map 350 by 190 km. A new quick play feature was added for the AI, which resolves roughly ten times faster than in previous games.

=== Rzhev '42 (2003) ===
Portrays the less known failure of Operation Mars. A storm condition was added to this game, which is intended to simulate the severe weather in which part of the operation was fought. It halves unit attack and move values, and reduces visibility to one hex. Unlike previous games, which contained historical overviews written by non-professionals, Rzhev '42 comes with a write-up from David Glantz. The usual designer notes, which discuss order of battle balancing, as well achieving historical results, and an extensive bibliography round up the documentation.

=== Market-Garden '44 (2003) ===
Attempts to simulate the combined airborne and ground assaults from Operation Market Garden, as well as the German counter-attacks. The Wargamer review focused mostly on the mechanics of gameplay.

=== El Alamein '42 (2004) ===
Starts with the May 1942 Axis envelopment of the line at Gazala, continues with the capture of Tobruk, the battles on the road to El Alamein, and concludes with the Second Battle of El Alamein. In order to provide some historical accuracy, when the fog of war is enabled in this game, the player's units can be damaged by their own minefields. The superior mobility and initiative of Afrika Korps, like the ability to form ad hoc kampfgruppen, is emulated by giving German units a superior command radius, which positively affects morale and supply. A scenario for Operation Herkules, a hypothetical Axis invasion of Malta, is also included as a bonus.

=== France '40 (2005) ===
Covers the German invasion of France and the Low Countries in May and June 1940.

=== Moscow '41 (2005) ===
Covers Operation Typhoon, the German attempt to capture Moscow in October 1941 during Operation Barbarossa.

=== Salerno '43 (2005) ===
Covers the Allied invasion of Salerno and Anzio in 1943 and 1944, as well as the German invasion of Crete in 1941 as a bonus.

=== Stalingrad '42 (2006) ===
Covers the Battle of Stalingrad, the German attempt to capture and hold the Soviet city of Stalingrad in 1942.

It was reviewed by Armchair General.

=== Minsk '44 (2006) ===
Covers Operation Bagration, the Soviet offensive against the German Army Group Centre in mid-1944.

=== Budapest '45 (2007) ===
Covers the Soviet Budapest Offensive in 1945 and Operation Konrad, the German attempt to relieve the defenders of the city.

=== Sealion '40 (2010) ===
Covers the hypothetical Operation Sealion, the planned German invasion of the United Kingdom in 1940. This was the final game to be published by HPS Simulations.

=== Kharkov '43 (2010) ===
Covers both Operation Star and Operation Gallop with the objective of completely destroying German forces in southern Russia and the Ukraine taking place 1,000 km west of Stalingrad. It contains 30 smaller scenarios with an average of 25 turns and 8 campaigns ranging from 57 turns to as high as 179 turns. Other features included are order of battle and scenario editors for custom games, a sub-map feature which allows players to cut a piece of the main map to create a custom scenario with and designer notes with an accompanying designer write-up. Armchair General praised the graphics, sound effects, and challenging AI, but found the 3D view uninspiring and the turns too lengthy. Armchair General ultimately gave it a score a 94%. This was the first game in the series to be self-published by John Tiller Software after their separation from HPS Simulations, which published their titles from 1999 till 2010.

=== Mius '43 (2011) ===
Covers fighting in the Mius-Front in July 1943. This is a demo title that is available for free as an introduction to the Panzer Campaigns series.

=== Tunisia '43 (2011) ===
Covers the Axis campaign in Tunisia in 1942 and 1943 aimed at halting the Allied advances in North Africa following Operation Torch.

=== Moscow '42 (2012) ===
Covers the Soviet winter counter-offensive of 1942 that followed the failed German attempt to take Moscow in Operation Typhoon. In addition, it also covers Operation Kremlin, a hypothetical second German offensive towards Moscow in the summer of 1942 that was historically only a deception operation intended to draw Soviet forces away from the Caucasus in preparation for Case Blue.

=== Japan '45 (2019) ===
Covers the hypothetical Operation Olympic, the first part of the planned Allied invasion of Japan that encompassed the invasion of Kyushu and nearby small islands in November 1945. This was the first title to be developed jointly with Wargame Design Studio.

=== Japan '46 (2019) ===
Covers the hypothetical Operation Coronet, the second part of the planned Allied invasion of Japan that encompassed the invasion of Tokyo and the Kanto Plain in March 1946.

=== Scheldt '44 (2020) ===
Covers the Battle of the Scheldt in 1944, the Allied campaign aimed at opening the port of Antwerp to shipping by pushing the German forces out of the Scheldt estuary.

=== Kiev '43 (2021) ===
Covers the Battle of Kiev in 1943, the Soviet operation aimed at crossing the Dnieper river and recapturing the city of Kiev, which had been lost to the Germans in 1941. This was the last title to be published by John Tiller Software.

This game was dedicated to studio founder John Tiller, who died in April 2021.

=== Rumyantsev '43 (2022) ===
Covers Operation Polkovodets Rumyantsev, the final Soviet operation aimed at recapturing the cities of Belgorod and Kharkov in August 1943, following the Third Battle of Kharkov earlier that year in which German forces had retaken these cities. It additionally covers the southern axis of Operation Citadel as a prologue. It is the first in a series of games titled Donets Front '43. This was the first title in the series to be published by Wargame Design Studio, which purchased John Tiller Software in 2021.

=== Philippines '44 (2023) ===
Covers the Philippines campaign in 1944 and 1945, the Allied operation to retake the Philippine islands after their capture by Japan in 1942.

=== Orel '43 (2023) ===
Covers Operation Kutuzov, the Soviet counteroffensive on the northern front of the Battle of Kursk, aimed at recapturing Orel and encircling German forces after the failure of Operation Citadel. It additionally covers the northern axis of Operation Citadel as a prologue. It is the second in a series of games titled Donets Front '43.

=== Spring Awakening '45 (2024) ===
Covers Operation Spring Awakening, the last major German offensive of World War II, aimed at securing Hungarian oil reserves and halting the Soviet advance towards Vienna.

=== Smolensk '43 (2024) ===
Covers Operation Suvorov, the 1943 Soviet offensive aimed at liberating Smolensk and the surrounding region, which had been captured two years prior during Operation Barbarossa.

=== Poland '39 (2025) ===
Covers Case White, the German invasion of Poland in September and October 1939.

=== Donbas '43 (2026) ===
Covers Soviet offensives and German counteroffensives in the Donbas between July and September 1943, including the Mius-Donets Offensive and Donbas strategic offensive. It includes updated and expanded versions of scenarios previously depicted in the Mius '43 demo.

== Gold releases ==
All games from 2012 and prior have received revamped "Gold" releases since 2017, developed by Wargame Design Studio, which was formed in 2016 and licensed to update the catalogue of John Tiller Software titles. Changes include updated map and unit graphics, new sounds, additional scenarios, updated orders of battle, a revamped interface, and an updated codebase.
