= Paul Norman (game designer) =

American video game designer (born 1951)

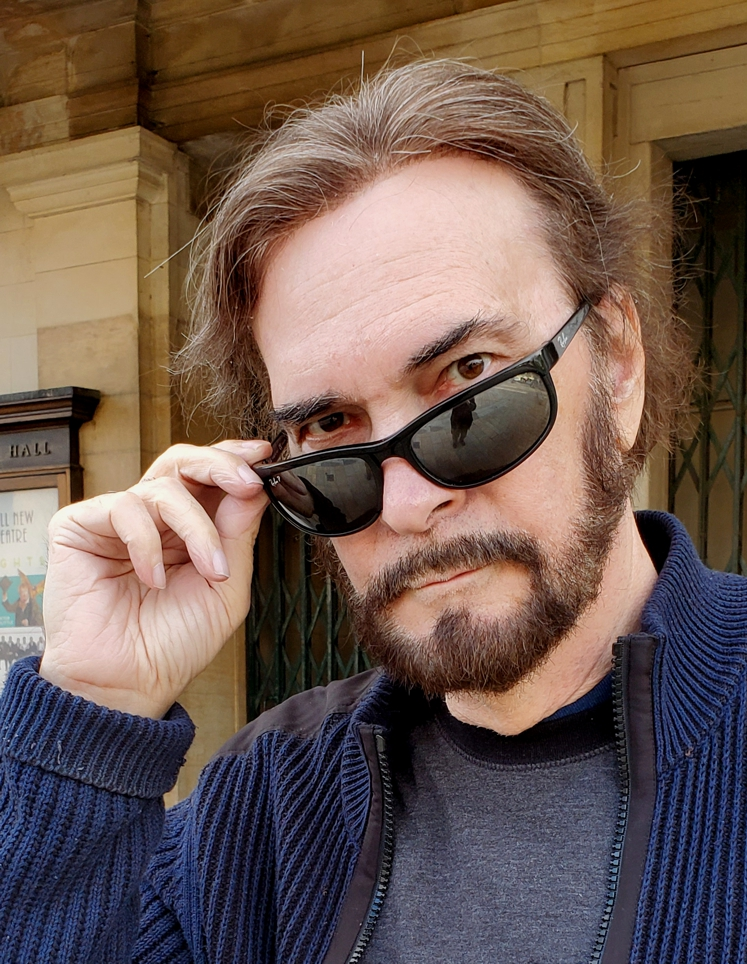
- Norman in 2019
- Born: December 18, 1951 (age 74)
- Occupation: Video game designer

Paul Norman (born December 18, 1951) is an American game designer, musician, composer, and computer programmer. He has been active in the music scene since 1970 and has been involved with the development of computer entertainment and information since 1982, including the production of Forbidden Forest in 1983.

== Career ==
=== Early career ===
Norman spent fifteen years working as a professional touring and studio musician.

=== Forbidden Forest ===
Norman programmed his first major computer program in the 1980s: a video game called Forbidden Forest. He has said his aim was to create a cinematic experience for its user. The game was programmed using the 6502 machine language. Forbidden Forest was originally developed for the company Synchro, which went out of business when the game was about three-quarters complete. However, the game was eventually bought out by American developer Cosmi and brought to completion. The finished game was later described as a "technical masterpiece" by Retro Gamer. The game was released in 1983.

=== Aztec Challenge ===
Norman's second title was an arcade-style game named Aztec Challenge, which was released in 1983 for the Commodore 64. Although marketed under the same name as an existing Cosmi release by Robert Bonifacio for the Atari 8-bit computers, Norman's C64 "Aztec Challenge" was a significantly different game which shared only its title and general concept with the original.

Norman authored the game's music, programming, and game design. Like his previous game, Aztec Challenge received praise for its "high standard of graphics and sound" from the game magazine publication Your Commodore.

=== Caverns of Khafka and Super Huey ===
Following the release of Aztec Challenge, Norman developed another game titled Caverns of Khafka,. As with Aztec Challenge, Caverns of Khafka was inspired by an existing 8-bit Atari computer game of the same name by Robert Bonifacio, but varied significantly from the original. It was released sometime between 1983 and 1984.

On the development of Super Huey (claimed to be the first helicopter simulator launched on the gaming market), Norman cites the television show Airwolf and the movie Blue Thunder as inspirations for its gameplay. The game went on to sell over two million copies. A Steam version of the game and its sequel were made available to the public in 2021.

=== 1990s to present day ===
In 1990, Norman joined a development team at Tiger Media, acting as a scriptwriter, audio and music producer, creator, and engineer. After two years as a design consultant for Sega, he was contracted to produce audio and video content for the Discovery Channel Software titled Carriers: Fortress at Sea.

Between 1995 and 1999, Norman became a consultant and contributor for internet projects, using Java programming to handle various responsibilities, from GUI to data processing.

== Games ==
Year	Title
1983	Forbidden Forest
1983	Aztec Challenge
1984	Caverns of Khafka
1985	Monster Trivia
1985	Beyond the Forbidden Forest
1985	Super Huey
1986	Def Con 5
1986	Super Huey II
1987	Chernobyl
1989	The President Is Missing
1989	Navy Seal
1991	Murder Makes Strange Deadfellows
1995	The Umbra Conspiracy
2003	Super Huey III
