= The Operational Art of War Vol. 1: 1939–1955 =

1998 video game

- Developer: TalonSoft
- Publisher: TalonSoft
- Designer: Norm Koger
- Series: The Operational Art of War
- Release: June 9, 1998
- Genre: Computer wargame
- Modes: Single-player, multiplayer

The Operational Art of War I: 1939–1955 is a 1998 computer wargame developed and published by TalonSoft. Designed by Norm Koger, it covers military conflicts around the world at the operational level of war, between 1939 and 1955.

The Operational Art of War was critically acclaimed, and was named the best computer wargame of 1998 by publications such as Computer Gaming World, PC Gamer US and Computer Games Strategy Plus. It spawned the Operational Art of War series, beginning with the sequel The Operational Art of War II: Modern Battles 1956–2000 (1999).

== Gameplay ==
The Operational Art of War is a computer wargame that simulates military conflicts around the world between 1939 and 1955. It takes place at the operational level.

== Development ==
The Operational Art of War was developed at TalonSoft and designed by Norm Koger, previously responsible for wargames such as Wargame Construction Set III: Age of Rifles. It was his first project for the company; he announced that he had left Strategic Simulations to sign with TalonSoft in March 1997. That April, Koger called The Operational Art of War "the game I've wanted to do for years."

== Reception ==
Reception

Review scores
Publication	Score
Computer Games Strategy Plus	4.5/5
Computer Gaming World	4.5/5
CNET Gamecenter	9/10
PC Games	A−

The Operational Art of War was named the best computer wargame of 1998 by Computer Gaming World, PC Gamer US, Computer Games Strategy Plus and GameSpot. It received a nomination in this category from CNET Gamecenter, and one for "Best Strategy Game of the Year" from IGN, but lost the awards respectively to People's General and StarCraft. The editors of Computer Games wrote that The Operational Art of War "balances detail against flexibility; in our minds, it does this better than most." Those of Computer Gaming World argued that it "shows that there is still plenty of life left in serious wargames."

=== Sales ===
TalonSoft struggled to distribute its games in 1998, according to Jim Rose. The Operational Art of War sold 12,789 copies in the United States that year, which accounted for $555,681 in revenue. Jason Ocampo of CNET Gamecenter reported, "TalonSoft had been shut out of Wal-Mart, the nation's largest retailer. When TalonSoft's games did make it to a store, they were often outnumbered by dozens of copies of a competitor's product." The company sold itself to Take-Two Interactive in late December 1998; Rose argued publicly that the move would aid in TalonSoft's distribution efforts for future games.

== Reviews ==
- The Duelist #35

== Legacy ==
In 1998, PC Gamer US declared The Operational Art of War the 50th-best computer game ever released, and the editors called it "nothing less than a masterpiece." An add-on disk was released in 1998 titled Battle Pack I. It includes 16 new scenarios.

=== Sequels ===
The Operational Art of War spawned the Operational Art of War series. It received a direct sequel, The Operational Art of War II: Modern Battles 1956–2000, in 1999. Later sequels include The Operational Art of War III (2006) and The Operational Art of War IV (2017).
