= Vietnam 2: Special Assignment =

2001 video game

- Developer: Single Cell Software
- Publisher: ValuSoft
- Platform: Windows
- Release: 2001

Vietnam 2: Special Assignment is a 2001 first-person shooter game developed by Single Cell Software and published by ValuSoft. The game is a sequel to Vietnam: Black Ops.

== Gameplay ==
Vietnam 2: Special Assignment is a war-themed first-person shooter set during the Vietnam War. The player is a soldier tasked with hunting down a rogue American colonel who has carved out his own dominion in a Cambodian temple. Across twelve levels, players trudge through environments including stone forts, sewers, narrow valleys, tunnels, and even areas shrouded in dense fog. Combat involves enemies appearing in small groups, sometimes using cover. Firefights rely on standard weapons—guns, rocket launchers, grenades. Enemy soldiers shout exaggerated lines in broken English, while the player character occasionally delivers one-liners.

== Reception ==
Reception

Review scores
Publication	Score
Absolute Games	20%
GameSpot	3.4/10

GameSpot said "As a budget-priced game, it's arguable that Vietnam 2 should be judged against a lower standard. Still, it's hard to imagine standards low enough to warrant playing it".

GameSpy said "Don't, however, let that keep you away. If semi-realistic, semi-historical shooters are your thing then Vietnam 2: Special Assignment might be your game, especially if you're on a $19.95 budget".
