= The 'Nam: Vietnam Combat Operations =

2020 video game

The Nam: Vietnam Combat Operations is a free-to-download real time strategy game about the Vietnam War released in 2020. It is a Vietnam War RTS that recreates company-sized combat operations covering Vietnam's various conflicts with America, Cambodia and China.

== Development ==
The game was developed over the course of 20 years, by amateur developer Tiger Yan using the Command and Conquer engine, and completed during the COVID-19 lockdown.

Originally covering just the American War from 1965 to 1975, its twin expansion packs, The Nam: Wider War and The Nam: Tour of Duty, were released in 2021 to add new units, music and maps while expanding the game to include operations in Laos, Cambodia, the air war over North Vietnam and the Sino-Vietnamese War of 1979.

== Gameplay ==
Players can play as either a US Marine Lieutenant Colonel commanding a full battalion, or a North Vietnamese Colonel commanding a full regiment. The US Marines can draw support from additional service branches like the Army for Special Forces (SF) troops, the Air Force and Navy for land and carrier-based air support, the Navy and Coast Guard for riverine warfare ships, South Vietnam’s Army of the Republic of Vietnam (ARVN) and even various tribes as mercenaries.

The expansion packs give Vietnamese Communist players access to more units, including the Khmer Rouge in Cambodia, the Pathet Lao in Laos and even China’s People’s Liberation Army, who briefly invaded Vietnam in 1979. These subfactions can only be accessed either by Americans or Vietnamese upon capturing special buildings. The game has various units including Marine riflemen, Vietcong guerrillas, villagers, and animals, realistically representing combat in the Vietnam theater.
