= Shellshock 2: Blood Trails =

2009 video game

- Developer: Rebellion Derby
- Publisher: Eidos Interactive
- Producer: John Walsh
- Designer: Keith Ledger
- Artist: Daryl Clewlow
- Composers: Martin Iveson; Ben McCullough
- Platforms: Microsoft Windows, PlayStation 3, Xbox 360
- Release: EU: February 13, 2009; NA: February 24, 2009
- Genre: First-person shooter
- Mode: Single-player

Shellshock 2: Blood Trails is a first-person shooter video game developed by Rebellion Derby and published by Eidos Interactive for Microsoft Windows, PlayStation 3 and Xbox 360. It is a sequel to Shellshock: Nam '67. It received poor reviews from critics.

== Plot ==
Two years after the events of Shellshock: Nam 67 in 1969, newly drafted soldier Nathaniel "Nate" Walker is brought to a secret military base in Vietnam by Sgt. Jack Griffin. Jack explains that the army has paid a man named Whiteknight to create a biological weapon to use in the war, but the plane transporting it was shot down. A group of soldiers was sent to retrieve it, but the only member who returned was Nate's brother Caleb "Cal" Walker, who had gone mad. Jack tries to get Nate to talk to Cal and calm him down, but before he can, a group of Viet Cong attacks, and Cal escapes in the confusion. While trying to get away, a Viet Cong captain named Trang corners Nate and attempts to get him to defect and lead him to Whiteknight. Nate and Jack manage to escape, but become separated.

Nate begins to get visions of Cal brutally attacking and killing American troops. When Nate sees a US Soldier get dragged into a tunnel under a church, he jumps in to follow him. On the other side, Nate finds some US troops holding out against the Viet Cong, along with action-obsessed movie star Serena and her cowardly agent Rupert. Nate has his first encounter with an infected, who kills Serena. Nate and Rupert manage to escape on a boat. Nate hears on the radio that Cal has been captured by special forces at a mansion, and the two head that way.

Once there, they discover the mansion swarming with infected, the soldiers dead, and Cal has escaped. Nate comes across Trang, who once again attempts to convince Nate to defect. Nate refuses again, and Trang is forced to retreat when Cal returns with more infected. Nate and Rupert once again try to escape. A group of infected kill Rupert, while Nate is cornered and almost killed when Jack returns with a helicopter, saving Nate but getting bit in the process. Jack turns in the helicopter, causing them to crash.

Nate has another vision of Cal, and realizes he's heading for a Buddha statue. He follows the Ho Chi Minh Trail, hoping to find him, but is captured by Trang. While knocked out, Nate has a vision of Cal meeting with Whiteknight, who claims he tried to sell his weapon to the US Government, and infects Cal with it to prove that it works. Nate breaks out of Trang's camp, hunts down, and kills Trang. As Nate leaves on a helicopter, he looks out to see an infected Jack get gunned down by the Viet Cong.

Arriving back at an American base, Nate rendezvous with the American leaders. They tell him another squad attempted to retrieve Whiteknight and failed, but they got the last transmission from them. Nate realizes it's Cal's voice, begging the US not to send anyone else and to leave the infected alone. However, they send Nate in to retrieve Cal and Whiteknight anyway. After tracking down Cal, Nate discovers that he has been cured of the infection, Whiteknight revealing that he gave Cal the antidote and can cure others with it but he did not write the formula down as insurance and demand to be extracted. However, Cal believes he will create another bioweapon and attempts to kill him, giving the player two options:

- If the player shoots Cal, he helps Whiteknight get to a helicopter while watching a reinfected Cal get executed by the US Army. While leaving Vietnam, Nate makes the decision that once Whiteknight gives the antidote to the government, he plans to kill him.
- If the player allows Cal to shoot Whiteknight, the two will leave together while Whiteknight is consumed by the infected. Nate says that Cal died three weeks later of his injuries, and the infected breaks out of the quarantine zone in Vietnam, slowly taking over the world, while there is a rush to discover an antidote.

== Reception ==
Reception

Aggregate score
| Aggregator | Score |
|---|---|
| Metacritic | (PC) 40/100 (PS3) 35/100 (X360) 30/100 |

Review scores
| Publication | Score |
|---|---|
| Eurogamer | 2/10 |
| GameSpot | (PC) 5.5/10; 4/10 |
| GamesRadar+ | 2/5 |
| IGN | 4.6/10 |
| VideoGamer.com | 3/10 |

Shellshock 2: Blood Trails received "generally unfavorable" reviews, according to review aggregator Metacritic.

=== Bans in Australia and Germany ===
On June 23, 2008, Shellshock 2: Blood Trails was refused classification by the Australian Classification Board, because of violence which was deemed too strong to be accommodated within the MA 15+ classification which was the highest rating video games could be given at the time. The game's distributor decided not to appeal the ban. For similar reasons, the game has been placed on the List of Media Harmful to Young People by the German Federal Department for Media Harmful to Young Persons and is illegal to distribute in the country.
