= Airborne Ranger =

1987 video game

- C64 cover art by Mark Freeman
- Developer: MicroProse
- Publisher: MicroProse
- Designers: Lawrence Schick; Scott Spanburg; Bill Stealey (concept)
- Artists: Iris Leigh Idokogi; Barbara Miller; Jackie Ross
- Composer: Ken Lagace
- Platforms: Commodore 64, MS-DOS, Amstrad CPC, ZX Spectrum, Amiga, Atari ST
- Release: 1987: C64, Spectrum; 1988: Amstrad, MS-DOS; 1989: Atari ST, Amiga
- Genre: Action
- Mode: Single-player

Airborne Ranger is an action game developed and published by MicroProse for the Commodore 64 and ZX Spectrum in 1987 and the Amstrad CPC and IBM PC compatibles in 1988. Ports to the Amiga and Atari ST by Imagitec Design were released in 1989. A sole U.S. Army Ranger is sent to infiltrate the enemy territory to complete various objectives. The game was followed by Special Forces in 1991.

== Gameplay ==
Ranger found some supplies during an arctic mission (Atari ST).

The game consists of several missions, in which the player controls a sole Ranger whose objectives include capturing an enemy officer, destroying an enemy bunker, taking out a SAM site, and rescuing a captured POW, which would possibly free a roster member that was labeled P.O.W. The game creates the maps and objective locations randomly, so the player is required to plan each mission carefully, because no mission is the same.

At the start of each mission, the player is presented with a short overview of the mission, and can select a Ranger from a roster of available soldiers. The player is then in control of an aircraft, described as a V-22 Osprey and is allowed to drop three ammo crates over the enemy territory. Once the three containers are dropped, the Ranger is parachuted into the area. Upon touch-down, the player has to overcome several obstacles, including enemy soldiers and officers, mine fields, foxholes and bunkers. Due to limited ammunition, the player needs to plan his path through the territory. The dropped ammo crates provide the soldier with fresh hand grenades and ammo. After completing the mission, the Ranger has to navigate to a pick-up point within a time limit. If the Ranger is captured (but not killed), the player can start an optional rescue mission using another soldier from the roster. Each successful mission increases the rank of the individual Ranger, up to colonel.

== Reception ==
Computer Gaming World described Airborne Ranger as "a Commando or Rambo with strategy included". The magazine's reviewer wrote that Airborne Ranger was reminiscent of Commando but much deeper and more versatile. He praised the graphics and sound, noting that gunfire sounds different when shot from inside fortifications than it does outside fortifications. The magazine's 1992 survey of computer wargames with modern settings gave the game four and a half stars out of five. In a 1994 survey of wargames the magazine gave the title two-plus stars out of five, describing it as "contemporary Ranger operations in a semi-arcade mode that works. Challenging and fun for both adults and children". It also received 4½ out of 5 stars in Dragon.

Compute!'s Gazette noted that Airborne Ranger was an unusual game for MicroProse's developers given their history of publishing simulations, writing "they have created an arcade game, and a darned good one". Compute! stated that "Airborne Ranger is an excellent game from beginning to end", but cautioned that "the violence and action are graphic and highly realistic".
