= Vietnam: Black Ops =

2000 video game

- Developer: Fused Software
- Publisher: ValuSoft
- Platform: Windows
- Release: 2000

Vietnam: Black Ops is a 2000 first-person shooter game developed by Fused Software and published by ValuSoft. A sequel, Vietnam 2: Special Assignment, was released in 2001.

== Gameplay ==
In Vietnam: Black Ops, the player takes on the role of an unnamed American soldier who begins the game imprisoned in a Vietnamese camp. An explosion frees him, setting the stage for a campaign of vengeance. From that point forward, the gameplay revolves around seizing weapons from fallen enemies—ranging from knives and rifles to grenade launchers and sniper rifles—and using them to single‑handedly wipe out entire battalions. The action unfolds across nine levels, each designed to evoke different hostile environments: underground tunnels, fortified bunkers, jungle paths, and mountain terrain. Progress is marked by constant ambushes and lone guards lurking around corners. Combat is simplified—any shot, whether to a leg or head, proves equally lethal. Players can counter enemy positioning by sniping from afar or memorizing ambush locations to unleash devastating attacks.

== Sales ==
The game sold more than 132,000 units in the United States. According to Single Cell Software (developers of the game's sequel), Vietnam: Black Ops ultimately sold 170,000 copies.

== Reception ==
Vietnam: Black Ops

Review scores
| Publication | Score |
|---|---|
| Absolute Games | 20% |
| IGN | 5.2/10 |
| Secret Service | 4/10 |
| Xtreme PC | 40% |

IGN rated the game a 5.2 out of 10 stating "Budget price or no, those brave or foolish enough to purchase this one deserve a purple heart for their struggle".
