= The Operational Art of War =

Video game series

- Players: 1 or 2
- Setup time: < 2 minutes
- Playing time: > 1 hour
- Chance: Medium
- Skills: Planning, strategy, tactics

The Operational Art of War (TOAW) is a series of computer wargames noted for their scope, detail, and flexibility in recreating, at an operational level, the major land battles of the 20th century. A Norm Koger design, TalonSoft published the first of the series in 1998. Matrix Games bought the rights to the franchise and re-released the game in 2006 as TOAW 3.

== Games in the series ==
TalonSoft published:

- The Operational Art of War Vol. 1: 1939–1955 (1998)
- The Operational Art of War II: Modern Battles 1956–2000 (1999)
- The Operational Art of War II: Flashpoint Kosovo (1999)
- The Operational Art of War II: Elite Edition (2000)
- The Operational Art of War: Century of Warfare (2000)

Matrix Games published:

- The Operational Art of War III (2006)
- The Operational Art of War IV (2017)

== Concept ==
The basic appearance of the game is the traditional view onto a hexagonal grid, although the player may choose a map-like overhead view with military symbols and basic info for the units, or an isometric view that depicts the units with small pictures of soldiers, tanks, etc. Gameplay is turn-based.

The scale of the game is variable, with distances ranging from 2.5 km per hex to 50 km per hex, and each turn simulating from 1/4 day to 1 week of time, but is fundamentally "operational", focusing on battalion, division, and corps combat. The option of scale is left to a maker of a particular scenario to choose, resulting in a wide range of user-made scenarios; ranging from, for example, a small engagement in northern Germany between several companies to an entire World War II on division scale.

The maximum number of units that can be made in a scenario was 2,000 per side until TOAW IV, although managing more than 200 can often be complicated. Each unit is assigned unique equipment (types of infantry, tanks, aircraft, etc.) and given its own name, info and color code.

The game also includes "events", which is a series of programmable events which display a message and can have several different causes and effects. The variability of these events makes each scenario—when properly designed—very complex and variable. The maximum number of in-game events is 500 (or 1,000 for TOAW III version).

The games include a scenario editor, and much of the content in the follow-up games are designs developed by the community of avid players.

== Version IV ==
Version IV was released November 2017, and included a large number of changes, among which are:

- unit limit increased from 2,000 to 10,000
- event limit increased from 999 to 10,000
- significant changes to naval combat
- significant changes to how combat uses turn time
- supply system

== Reception ==
=== Volume 1 ===
In the United States, The Operational Art of War sold 12,789 copies during 1998. These sales accounted for $555,681 in revenue that year.

=== Volume 2 ===
In the United States, The Operational Art of War Volume II sold 1,298 copies during 1999.
