= Vietcong 2 =

2005 video game

- Developers: Pterodon; Illusion Softworks, a.s.
- Publisher: 2K
- Platform: Microsoft Windows
- Release: NA: October 26, 2005; PAL: October 28, 2005
- Genres: First-person shooter, tactical shooter
- Modes: Single-player, multiplayer

Vietcong 2 is a tactical shooter video game, developed by Pterodon and Illusion Softworks, published by 2K for Microsoft Windows in October 2005, and set during the Vietnam War. It is the direct sequel to Vietcong.

== Gameplay ==
The story takes place during the Tet Offensive in Hue. The player assumes the role of the disillusioned American MACV soldier Captain Daniel Boone (named after the MACSOG Operation Daniel Boone). Boone is part of a coalition of international forces from Australia, New Zealand and Canada. The game also gives the player the ability to fight the war from another perspective as a young Vietcong recruit fighting before and during the Tet Offensive. This campaign is unlocked when the player has completed a certain part of the American campaign.

== Reception ==
Reception

Aggregate score
Aggregator	Score
Metacritic	61/100

Review scores
Publication	Score
1Up.com	C
Computer Games Magazine	2.5/5
Computer Gaming World	2/5
Eurogamer	6/10
GameSpot	6.9/10
GameSpy	3/5
GameZone	7.2/10
IGN	6.8/10
PC Gamer (US)	58%
VideoGamer.com	5/10

Vietcong 2 received "mixed" reviews according to the review aggregation website Metacritic.
