= Shellshock: Nam '67 =

2004 video game

- Developer: Guerrilla Games
- Publisher: Eidos Interactive
- Director: David Bowry
- Designer: Douglas Walker
- Programmer: Jorrit Rouwé
- Artist: Mathijs de Jonge
- Writer: Matthew J. Costello
- Platforms: PlayStation 2, Windows, Xbox
- Release: EU: September 3, 2004; NA: September 14, 2004; AU: September 23, 2004
- Genre: Third-person shooter
- Mode: Single-player

Shellshock: Nam '67 is a 2004 third-person shooter video game developed by Guerrilla Games and published by Eidos Interactive for Microsoft Windows, PlayStation 2, and Xbox. The game leans atmospherically into a gritty, war-torn aesthetic with a grainy visual filter that simulates the look of ’60s war photography and films, reinforcing the harshness and grim reality of combat.

== Gameplay ==
The player experiences combat from a third-person perspective, with the character visible on screen as they navigate the jungles, villages, and tunnels of Vietnam. The game emphasizes a sense of realism rooted in the era, rather than carrying an over-sized arsenal, the player is limited to one heavy weapon, a sidearm (or two sidearms), and collection of grenades. Weapons are historically modeled from Vietnam-era rifles to mounted machine guns, with the player being able to pick up dropped weapons from defeated enemies, such as AK-47s.

Movement and combat reflect gritty, close-quarters warfare. The player can crouch, go prone, and lean to take cover behind natural features like rocks, trees, and terrain contours, which promotes a more tactical approach rather than a run-and-gun style. The environment is not just decoration: using foliage and terrain strategically allows the player to mask their presence and choose safer lines of engagement, evoking the tension and uncertainty of real jungle combat.

A notable gameplay mechanic is the “shellshock” meter, which is a system reflecting the psychological and physical toll of combat. If the player sustains damage, the meter fills, making them more vulnerable and less resilient, which is essentially punishing reckless behavior and encouraging a more cautious, deliberate playstyle. In order to recover, the players must find moments of reprieve, hide, so the shellshock meter will be able to drop.

Damage modeling in the game is quite detailed. Rather than enemies always dying instantly, they may suffer different “hit response states,” from light wounds to more severe damage, including dismemberment, depending on weapon type and hit accuracy. This layered damage system adds weight to firefights and underscores the brutality of the conflict. When enemies die, they often drop their weapons, which player can then scavenge and use. Addition to large-scale battles, it includes stealth-oriented missions, where players might be tasked with infiltration, assassination, or rescuing prisoners, operating more covertly rather than engaging in all-out firefights. There are also set-piece moments: for instance, the player may man a helicopter gun position, adding variety to the pacing of combat.

Between missions, there is a base camp phase which functions as a kind of hub. The player can interact with other soldiers and officers, trade or acquire items, and ready for the next mission. These interludes provide role-playing elements, giving the player a chance to manage resources, gain intelligence, or customize their approach to future operations.

Missions are structured to reflect different phases of the protagonist’s “tour of duty.” As the player advances, they may be promoted into Special Forces, such as new mission types and tactical challenges. The variety of mission design, ranging from open battlefield engagements to tight stealth assignments, helps maintain tension and reflects the unpredictable nature of the Vietnam War. The combat system would then reward players a tactical thinking and caution. Due to limited ammo, realistic weapon behavior, and the threat of shellshock, players are encouraged to use the environment, change their position, and make deliberate decisions about engagements. There is no single “correct” way to complete many encounters, whether to rush in with firepower or pick off enemies from covered angles is often left to the player’s judgment.

== Plot ==
The game starts in January 1967 in Saigon, South Vietnam. A Boeing CH-47 Chinook containing Caleb "Cal" Walker, the game's protagonist, and other G.I.s, lands at Tan Son Nhut Air Base in southern Saigon. Walker, along with his squad mate, Private "Psycho" Kowalski, are chosen by their CO, to participate in an air assault on a Viet Cong encampment within Kon Tum province. Walker and Kowalski are put under the command of Lieutenant O'Brien along with another G.I. nicknamed "Short Timer". As Caleb and his squad proceed through the area, a friendly fire incident, involving flawed mortar coordinates, forces another G.I. named Tompkins, to join the squad. Along with the help of a special operations squad made up of Sergeant Ramirez, "Tick Tock" and "Eyeball", they help Walker and the others clear out the VC encampment. The encampment is soon after converted to a fire base, which serves as a headquarters for Walker and his unit.

Soon after, Walker's squad is tasked with investigating VC activity in a nearby village. The squad is also charged with finding a journalist who had recently gone missing in the village. After learning about the dangers of booby traps, the squad proceeds to the village. However, when the squad is ambushed in the rice paddies just outside the village, it becomes very clear that the villagers are aiding the VC. After clearing out the VC, Walker begins the task of searching for weapon caches within the village. After finding numerous hidden weapons and supplies, the squad begins searching for the missing journalist, and shortly thereafter find him being held hostage by several VC. The journalist disclose the name of the VC/NVA commander in the region, General Diem, the game's main antagonist.

They jump to the next task of seizing an old French fort being used as a POW camp. After fighting through the valley entrance, and clearing out multiple bunkers after an ineffective napalm strike, they assault the fort. Walker explores the basement and finds the POWs; after freeing them from their cells, he discovers one tied to chair with obvious signs of torture. He tells Walker that the NVA has planted explosives in the basement in an attempt to demolish the fort. He escapes with seconds to spare. The squad is then given orders to defend the fort from NVA and VC attacks. Later that night, the enemy attacks. Tompkins is sniped at the start of the attack and O'Brien is hacked to death with machetes in full view of Walker's squad. The attackers are finally repelled after Special Forces arrive.

The next morning, Walker is told to report to Sergeant Ramirez and joins Special Forces now led by Colonel Salter. They take on subversive, rescue, and assault missions. During one mission, Caleb's team are sent to rescue Ramirez's team who had been lured into a trap. During the extraction, Ramirez's team stay behind to cover Caleb's team but got killed by an RPG. The Special Forces team locates Diem's underground listening outpost and destroy it before heading out to rescue captured American GIs in a nearby brothel where Psycho is killed by an RPG. They eventually capture Mama-san, a whore who operates near the US firebase, who disclose Diem's location.

Walker's final mission is to defeat General Diem, whose base of operations is at a Buddhist temple near the Laos border. He succeeds and delivers Diem's severed head to the base. Afterwards, Walker's chopper is shot down en route to China Lake. Walker escapes from NVA captivity and helps fend off a massive attack on base camp by both NVA and VC forces. Finally, an air strike is called in, leaving Walker and Monty, a friendly South Vietnamese soldier, as the only survivors.

== Reception ==
Reception

Aggregate score
Aggregator	Score		
Aggregator	PC	PS2	Xbox
Metacritic	50/100	58/100	58/100

Review scores
Publication	Score		
Publication	PC	PS2	Xbox
Edge	4/10	4/10	4/10
Electronic Gaming Monthly	N/A	5.67/10	5.67/10
Eurogamer	N/A	6/10	N/A
Game Informer	N/A	6/10	6/10
GamePro	N/A	3/5	3/5
GameSpot	5.4/10	5.4/10	5.4/10
GameSpy	2/5	N/A	N/A
GameZone	N/A	6.8/10	6/10
IGN	5.8/10	5.8/10	5.8/10
Official U.S. PlayStation Magazine	N/A	2/5	N/A
Official Xbox Magazine (US)	N/A	N/A	6.4/10
PC Gamer (US)	15%	N/A	N/A
The Sydney Morning Herald	2.5/5	2.5/5	2.5/5

ShellShock: Nam '67 received "mixed or average" reviews, according to review aggregator Metacritic.

IGN found the game to have "many faults" and criticized the presentation of war as tasteless. Eurogamer also noted that the game was "a trivial representation of a bloody conflict for our personal entertainment" but thought that "when it hits the spot it's briefly thrilling" and admired the creators' ambition in at least attempting to make a game which was not bland and sanitized.

The game sold 800,000 copies.

A sequel entitled Shellshock 2: Blood Trails was released in 2009.
