= Rambo (1987 video game) =

- North American cover artwork featuring Sylvester Stallone as John Rambo
- Developer: Pack-In-Video
- Publishers: JP: Pack-In-Video; NA: Acclaim Entertainment
- Designer: Akihiro Tokita
- Composers: Toru Hasabe; Minky Motoyama
- Platform: Nintendo Entertainment System
- Release: JP: December 4, 1987; NA: May 1988
- Genres: Action, platform, Metroidvania
- Mode: Single-player

Rambo is an action-adventure video game produced by Pack-In-Video for the Nintendo Entertainment System (NES). It was released on December 4, 1987 in Japan, and May 1988 in North America. It is based on the film Rambo: First Blood Part II (1985).

== Gameplay ==
The game starts off with Colonel Trautman asking Rambo whether or not he wants to leave the prison and start the mission. Players are given a choice, but cannot advance in the game unless "yes" is chosen. Players advance through the camp and talk to others, and when talking to Trautman again, he tells Rambo the mission. Rambo then drops into the forest and fights spiders and other forest creatures. Bosses include giant spiders and helicopters. The game has similar gameplay to Zelda II: The Adventure of Link. In the Japanese version, the experience meter is replaced by an anger meter; however, it functions exactly the same.

Later in the game, Rambo picks up an arsenal of weapons and fights enemy soldiers.

The ending sequence allows the player to throw a giant kanji character (怒, Ikari:Anger) towards Murdock after returning to the base, which inexplicably turns Murdock into a frog.

== Release ==
In a 1998 interview, Acclaim co-founder Greg Fischbach said that Rambo helped bring home to Acclaim the importance of licensing: "I remember having a conversation with a buyer for a large chain of retail stores, and we would bring him titles like Wizards & Warriors, and he would say, 'No, I don't want it. You bring me a name I recognize and I'll buy your title.' So we brought him Rambo and he put it in his release schedule. Now, Rambo was not as good a game as Wizards & Warriors, but that was the way he worked, and we had to deal with that."

== Reception ==
In North America, the game sold 600,000 copies.
