= Missing in Action (video game) =

1989 video game

- Developer: Konami
- Publisher: Konami
- Platform: Arcade
- Release: January 1989
- Genre: Run and gun
- Mode: Up to 2 players simultaneously
- Arcade system: JP: Konami Twin16; NA: TMNT

M.I.A.: Missing in Action is a run and gun arcade video game released by Konami in 1989. The game is a spiritual successor to Green Beret (also known as Rush'n Attack). The game is influenced by popular action films of the time such as Commando, Rambo: First Blood Part II, and Missing in Action.

== Gameplay ==
The player takes on the role of a US Army special operations Green beret and player 2 takes the role of a soldier of the United Nations in cooperative mode. Players must infiltrate enemy POW camps in Vietnam to find prisoners of wars and lead them to freedom. Like its predecessor, there are a total of six levels in the game: war-torn field, jungle, airstrip, railyard, POW camp, and escaping POW camp. M.I.A. can be played by up to two players, with player 1 in green and player 2 in blue.

Throughout most of the game, the player's main weapon is a knife, which is capable of destroying any enemy in the game. By killing the red enemy soldiers, the player can acquire additional weapons. The available weapons consist of an assault rifle, a flamethrower, a bazooka, and grenades. Unlike Green Beret, the player can carry more than one weapon and switch between them at will. If the player loses a life, then only their currently equipped weapon will be lost.

At the end of each level, an assorted number of troops appears on fixed machine gun positions (usually four) that must be eliminated. On the last mission of the game, the freed hostages are susceptible to being slain by enemies; if all the POWs get killed then "MISSION FAILED" flashes on the screen and the game is permanently over.

== Versions ==
There were three versions of M.I.A.: versions S and T, which were produced for the American and international markets, and a Japanese version. In some versions, the order of the first four stages is randomized. In the Japanese version, every second stage scrolls from left-to-right instead of right-to-left as in the international versions.

Missing in Action was made available on Microsoft's Game Room service for its Xbox 360 console and for Windows-based PCs in December 2010.

== Reception ==
In Japan, Game Machine listed Missing in Action on their March 15, 1989 issue as being the twentieth most-successful table arcade unit of the month.
