= The Operational Art of War II: Modern Battles 1956–2000 =

1999 video game

- Developer: TalonSoft
- Publisher: TalonSoft
- Series: The Operational Art of War
- Release: 1999

The Operational Art of War II: Modern Battles 1956–2000 is a 1999 computer wargame developed and published by TalonSoft. It is the second game in the Operational Art of War series. An add-on disk was released in 1999 titled Flashpoint Kosovo.

== Development ==
The Operation Art of War II was developed by TalonSoft as a sequel to its earlier game The Operational Art of War Vol. 1: 1939–1955.

== Reception ==
Reception

Review score
Publication	Score
CNET Gamecenter	9/10

In the United States, The Operational Art of War Volume II sold 1,298 copies during 1999.

The Operational Art of War II won the 1999 Charles Roberts Award for "Best 20th Century Era Computer Wargame". The editors of PC Gamer US nominated The Operational Art of War Volume II for their 1999 "Best Wargame" award, although it lost to Close Combat III: The Russian Front. They wrote that "no serious wargaming library should be without a copy" of Volume II. Computer Gaming World also nominated The Operational Art of War Volume II as 1999's "Wargame of the Year", a prize ultimately given to Sid Meier's Antietam! The editors noted it as a step down from the first game. CNET Gamecenter nominated Modern Battles for its "Best Turn-Based Strategy Game" award, which went to Sid Meier's Alpha Centauri.
