= Aztec Challenge =

- Developer: Cosmi
- Publisher: Cosmi
- Platforms: Atari 8-bit, Commodore 64, TI-99/4A, VIC-20
- Release: NA: 1982; DE: 1984
- Genre: Action

Aztec Challenge refers to either of two early action video games published by Cosmi, as well as two subsequent remakes. In all game versions the player takes control of a running Aztec warrior. The first was a side-scrolling platform-jumping game created by Robert Tegel Bonifacio and released in 1982 for Atari 8-bit computers. Subsequently, a different game with the same title and overall theme was created by Paul Norman and released for the Commodore 64. It includes a level in a modified-first-person 3D-style.

== Atari 8-bit computer version (1982) ==
The original 1982 Cosmi release of Aztec Challenge on the Atari 8-bit

Improved 1983 version, also on the Atari 8-bit

The original version of the game on the Atari 8-bit computers presented itself as a side-scroller, with the player's character running continuously from left to right as the background and path continuously scrolled. Control was limited to jumping at three different heights; holding the joystick down and pressing the button resulted in a low jump, holding the joystick up and pressing the button resulted in a high jump, and pressing the button by itself resulted in a medium jump. The running speed of the character was constant; only the height of the jumps differed, although speed of the character gradually increased of its own accord with each passing level. In two-player mode, each player controlled a different colored character with one character running in front of the other. The object of the game was to cover as much distance as possible without succumbing to the assorted perils of the path. Obstacles included platforms and ceilings of differing heights, pits, spikes, platform steps of staggered heights, and other assorted pitfalls. Contact with any part of the landscape other than the path would result in the loss of a player's life and would return the player to the last checkpoint.

=== Different versions ===
There was more than one different version of Aztec Challenge on the Atari 8-bit, although (unlike the very different Commodore 64 release) all featured the same basic side-scrolling gameplay.

The game was originally released as The Bonifas through the Atari Program Exchange under a non-exclusive agreement. However, the title was picked up almost immediately for distribution by Cosmi, who renamed it Aztec Challenge and had a simultaneous two-player option added.

In 1983, Cosmi released another version (still sold as Aztec Challenge) featuring significantly improved graphics, but similar gameplay.

== Commodore 64 version (1983) ==
The 3D stage in Paul Norman's Commodore 64 version of Aztec Challenge

=== Gameplay ===
The player must guide their character through seven different levels. In every level new deadly perils lurk for the hero. The first, entitled The Gauntlet, sees the player running towards a temple in the distance. On the left and right are Aztecs who throw spears at the player, who must duck under the spear or jump over it (depending on the height the spear is coming at). If the player fails to avoid a spear they are placed back at the start of the level.

In the second level, The Stairs, the player is required to dodge left and right to avoid stone blocks thrown down at them as they ascend the stairs of the temple.

Level 3 is The Temple which features traps which must be avoided by pausing the protagonist's motion or jumping.

Level 4, The Vermin works in a similar way to the preceding level with the control system offering the choices of high and low jumps in this section.

Level 5, Hopaztec, asks the player to cross a tile-filled room, avoiding booby-trapped tiles.

In Level 6, Piranha, the player must swim across a lake avoiding the deadly man-eating fish.

Level 7, The Bridge is the final level. The player runs automatically to the right and gaps in the bridge must be traversed by low, medium or high jumps depending on the size of the gap.

=== Music ===
The music was written by Paul Norman (the game author), who was a musician before becoming a computer programmer. The slowly, but gradually unfolding tunes become increasingly tense and complex as the player progresses through the long, monotonic and increasingly difficult levels.

=== Reception ===
Your Commodore's reviewer praised the "high standard of graphics and sound" in the game and thought it was "one of the best games around."

Commodore User said the game was "rivetting" with in the most part "really excellent" graphics. They were less impressed with the music which they found "gets boring after a while."

== Legacy ==
This game was remade in 2003 by Paul Norman as Azteca: Queen of Quetzalcoatl. It is only found on his website, DigiTTARIUS.

A clone of Paul Norman's Commodore 64 version of Aztec Challenge was released in 2006 for the Atari 2600 as A-VCS-tec Challenge.
