= Squad Battles: Vietnam =

2001 video game

- Developer: HPS Simulations
- Publisher: HPS Simulations
- Designer: John Tiller
- Platform: Windows
- Release: 2001
- Genre: Computer wargame
- Modes: Single-player, multiplayer

Squad Battles: Vietnam is a 2001 computer wargame developed and published by HPS Simulations. It was designed by John Tiller.

== Gameplay ==
Squad Battles: Vietnam is a computer wargame that simulates conflict during the Vietnam War.

== Development ==
Squad Battles: Vietnam was designed by John Tiller. For its design, he was inspired by the board wargame Squad Leader, published by Avalon Hill.

== Reception ==
Reception

Review scores
Publication	Score
Computer Gaming World	4/5
PC Gamer (US)	90%

In Computer Gaming World, Bruce Geryk wrote that Squad Battles: Vietnam was "not the most original design, but it's one of the best of recent years". William R. Trotter of PC Gamer US was strongly positive toward the game, which he considered "one of the best tactical games since Avalon Hill's Squad Leader boardgame".

Computer Gaming World and Wargamer named Squad Battles: Vietnam the best computer wargame of 2001; the former publication dubbed it a "compelling" title that "shows that there's still some life in traditional wargaming systems". The editors of Computer Games Magazine nominated the game in this category, but ultimately gave the prize to Panzer Campaigns: Bulge '44, another John Tiller title.
