= Made Man (video game) =

2006 video game

- European art cover
- Developer: SilverBack Studios
- Publishers: Mastertronic (PS2); Aspyr (PC)
- Writers: David Fisher; Jim Bottomley
- Engine: RenderWare
- Platforms: Microsoft Windows, PlayStation 2
- Release: EU: November 6, 2006 (PC); AU: November 16, 2006; EU: November 30, 2006 (PS2); NA: April 2, 2007 (PS2); NA: April 23, 2007 (PC)
- Genre: Third-person shooter

Made Man, known in North America as Made Man: Confessions of the Family Blood, is a 2006 third-person shooter video game developed by the UK company SilverBack Studios and published by Mastertronic and Aspyr for PlayStation 2 and Microsoft Windows. The game is set in the year 1972 within the New York City underworld of organized crime in the Mafia. The storyline is written by crime author David Fisher with collaboration from former mafioso Salvatore "Bill" Bonanno.

The player assumes the role of Joey Verola, a former soldier, as he is indoctrinated into the world of American organized crime and must relive his life – every moment, every kill – as he rises through the ranks to become a made man. The storyline spans three decades of his life, from the horror of Vietnam to the urban jungle of Brooklyn.

== Plot ==
Joey (Rick Pasqualone) is forced into the world of crime when he saves a don's right-hand man in Vietnam. The game's missions are a series of flashbacks: as Joey is being driven to the don's place to be made he reveals to his nephew how he rose through the ranks.

== Development ==
The title was originally under development at Acclaim Entertainment's Manchester studio under the name of Interview with a Made Man. When Acclaim collapsed, employees from its studio reformed as SilverBack Studios, and backed by Fund4Games, continued to work on the game. The title was shortened to Made Man and a planned Xbox conversion was dropped.

After the release of Made Man, members from the team reformed as the Manchester office of Vivendi-owned Swordfish Studios working on the console versions of World in Conflict. When, in turn, that was sold on during the Activision Blizzard merger, it became the Manchester office of MMOG developer Monumental Games.

== Reception ==
Reception

Aggregate score
Aggregator	Score	
Aggregator	PC	PS2
Metacritic	40/100	45/100

Review scores
Publication	Score	
Publication	PC	PS2
1Up.com	N/A	F
Eurogamer	N/A	5/10
Gamekult	3/10	3/10
GameSpot	2.8/10	2.6/10
GameTrailers	N/A	5.7/10
GameZone	3.1/10	6/10
IGN	2.4/10	2.4/10
Jeuxvideo.com	6/20	6/20
PC Gamer (US)	60%	N/A
PlayStation: The Official Magazine	N/A	4/10

The game received "generally unfavorable reviews" on both platforms according to the review aggregation website Metacritic.
