= Nam (1986 video game) =

1986 video game

NAM
- Publisher(s): Strategic Simulations
- Platform(s): Apple II, Atari 8-bit, Commodore 64
- Release: 1986
- Genre(s): Turn-based strategy

NAM is a computer wargame published in 1986 by Strategic Simulations for the Apple II, Atari 8-bit computers, and Commodore 64.

== Gameplay ==
NAM is a game in which the daily warfare by US army units in South Vietnam is simulated.

== Reception ==
Mark Bausman reviewed the game for Computer Gaming World, and stated that "As a simulation of the tactics of the Vietnam war it is too generic. But, as an introductory wargame Nam has value as it is highly playable."
