= SEAL Team (video game) =

1993 video game

- Developer: Electronic Arts
- Publisher: Electronic Arts
- Producer: Paul Grace
- Designers: Andre Gagnon; Paul Grace; Sonny Hays-Ebert
- Programmer: Scott Cronce
- Artists: Tom Collie; Gary Martin
- Composer: George Sanger
- Platform: MS-DOS
- Release: June 1, 1993
- Genre: Tactical shooter
- Mode: Single-player

SEAL Team is a Vietnam War video game which was released by Electronic Arts for MS-DOS in 1993.

== Gameplay ==
The game uses 3D vector and bitmap graphics of the modified LHX: Attack Chopper game engine to recreate 80 historical operations of the four-man US Navy SEAL teams in the Mekong Delta area of Vietnam. The game featured an unprecedented amount of realism and is referred to as "tactical combat simulation" by IGN.

== Reception ==
Reception

Review score
Publication	Score
Electronic Entertainment	7 out of 10

Computer Gaming World in 1994 gave SEAL Team four stars out of five, describing it as "the most detailed SpecOps game ever done. One cannot call the game experience necessarily enjoyable, but the Vietnam Conflict definitely comes alive". SEAL Team was a runner-up for the magazine's Simulation Game of the Year award in June 1994, losing to IndyCar Racing. The editors wrote that SEAL Team is "the first simulation to treat infantry combat with the same detail as would a game of armored or aerial combat, and it is one of the most sensitively handled treatments of Vietnam Conflict that we've seen".

== See also ==
- Navy SEALS
- SOCOM U.S. Navy SEALs
- SOCOM U.S. Navy SEALs: Confrontation
