= Cosmi Corporation =

Budget software publisher based in Carson, California, founded 1982

Cosmi Corporation (COSMI) was an American computer software company based in Carson, California. It sold low-cost software directly to consumers in large retail outlets, computer stores, and drug, hardware, and grocery stores. It had two major imprints: Celery Software, and Swift Software/Swift Jewel.

Platforms it has published for include: Atari 8-bit computers, Atari 16-bit computers, the VIC-20, Commodore 64, Commodore 128, and Amiga, Apple II computers, IBM and Tandy compatibles, Windows, Palm OS, and PocketPC.

== History ==
Cosmi Corporation was founded in 1982 by George Johnson. Its business model was of vertical integration, rapidly pivoting into trendy or popular product niches, and maintaining low prices. It published and distributed software for personal computer systems.

== Products ==
Cosmi products included games, such as Forbidden Forest, The President Is Missing, and Aztec Challenge. It also published utility software including a database, word processor, spreadsheet, street maps, vacation planners, and a 3D World Atlas.

Further examples include:

- Print Perfect Scrapbook Deluxe - Creates memorable scrapbook layouts, templates, designs, decorative artwork, and photo editing tools.
- mySkins iPod Video - Styles and protects the surface of the iPod.
- Website Promoter - Contains tools that will drive traffic to a website, optimise rankings in key search engines, and boost site's popularity.
- Perfect Website Creator
- Platinum Perfect Pro Office System Software, a version of OpenOffice.org
- Greeting Card Magic

== Shovelware ==
In 2001, Cosmi began publishing shovelware, which was sold at Best Buy and Office Depot.

Examples from this era include:

- 20,000 Recipes
- 3D Bubble Burst
- 3D Bug Attack
- 3D Frog Frenzy
- 3D Pinball Express
- 3D Missile Madness
- 3D Virtual Reality Landscaper
- Amazing Calendar Marker
- Amazing Flow Chart Maker
- Board Games
- Brochure Magic
- Business Card Maker
- Card Games
- Desktop Publisher
- Forms Maker and Filler
- Free Financial Calculator
- Free Fonts and Dingbats
- Free Fractal Chaos Screen Savers
- Free Game Run Away Train
- Free Wind Power Screen Saver
- Guide to the Galaxy
- Herbert + The Underwater Pyramid
- Label Publisher
- Las Vegas Super Casino
- Mah Jongg Magic
- PC Attorney
- Photo Editor Plus
- Professional Resume Plus
- SAT ACT Prep
- Stationery Maker
- Talking Flash Cards
- Top 20 Solid Gold
- Top 50 Blazing Games

All of which were published on the same disk. The installer would ask which one was being installed and then ask for a specific word on a specific page of the manual of the selected product, as a form of rudimentary DRM.

== ValuSoft Games ==
Year	Title	Platform(s)	Developer	Notes
1999	Desperados	Windows	Rise Software	A shooting gallery game where the player character is Jesse James. AllGame gave it a score of three out of five stars.
1999	Let's Ride!	Windows	Norstedt Raben Multimedia	A game about horses featuring show jumping and dressage.
1999	The War in Heaven	Windows	Eternal Warriors	
2000	100+ Great Games	Windows	N/A	100+ Great Games sold over 220,000 units in the United States.
2000	Millennium Game Pack Gold	Windows	Antidote Entertainment	Millennium Game Pack Gold was released in October 2000. The title sold over 180,000 units in The United States, and was ranked the 15h best selling game in the US in January 2001 according to NPD.
2000	Vietnam: Black Ops	Windows	Fused Software	
2000	NHRA Drag Racing 2	Windows	moto1.net	
2001	Elite Forces WWII: Normandy	Windows	Third Law Interactive; 3LV Games	Elite Forces WWII: Normandy sold more than 45,000 units in the United States.
2001	Vietnam 2: Special Assignment	Windows	Single Cell Software	
2004	NHRA Drag Racing: Top Fuel Thunder	Windows	N/A	

== Mergers and Dissolution ==
In 2012, Cosmi acquired ValuSoft from the now-defunct video game publisher THQ for an undisclosed sum. The company was renamed to ValuSoft Cosmi.

In 2020, Play Hard Games was acquired, and then dissolved, by Ziggurat Interactive. As of 2025, some of its games are still sold under the ValuSoft Cosmi brand.
