= Tactical shooter =

Video game genre

Arma 3 (2013) is a modern example of a tactical shooter and a milsim. Variants of it are also used by real militaries for military simulation training.

A tactical shooter is a sub-genre of first- and third-person shooters, associated with using strategy, planning, and tactics in gameplay, as well as the realistic simulations of ballistics, firearm mechanics, physics, stamina, and low time to kill. Dating back to strategy games from the late 1980s, the genre first rose to prominence in the late 1990s with the releases of several well-received tactical shooters. The popularity of the genre saw a decline in the late 2000s as fast-paced "arcade"-like action shooters rose to prominence, it has seen a revitalization since the mid-2010s with the successful releases of several modern tactical shooters.

Tactical shooters involving military operations in grounded and realistic settings are sometimes known as milsims. These games and (often) mods enhance the genre's realism to include aspects such as individual limb damage, realistic multi-step injury treatment, enhanced ballistic and ricochet simulations, weapon wear and malfunctions, detailed vehicle damage and repairs, and lengthy trips to the area of operations, to authentically simulate military procedure.

== Game design ==
According to IGN, tactical shooters "are about caution, care, cooperation, coordination, planning, and pacing. In these games, making decisive pushes, quick moves for cover, strategic retreats, and last ditch grabs at the gold are not only important to success, but balanced in such a way that they become enjoyable activities in play."

Tactical shooters are designed around realism and authenticity, primarily in regards to weapon functionality, movement, and mission objectives. A staple of tactical shooters is their low time to kill, where players and NPCs can be killed in a short amount of time or with very few attacks. To account for this, a number of tactical shooters implement different levels of body armor, such as in the Rainbow Six and SWAT series, though these only offer a modicum of safety and do not guarantee player survival. The consequences of death may also be high: players may have to be revived, have lengthy respawn times, or have their character killed permanently; there may also be a lack of checkpoints in levels, forcing players to restart upon failure or continue with their inflicted losses. Due to this realistic but punishing gameplay, the individual heroism seen in other shooter games is drastically restrained, players are forced to rely on proper military tactics and teamwork to succeed, and playstyles are typically slower than other types of shooters. More caution and patience is required in combat, such as methodically advancing through cover and concealment as opposed to charging toward the enemy and shooting in the open.

Emphasis is placed on realistic modeling of weapons and ballistics, and power-ups are generally more limited than in other shooters, if existent at all. Weapons in tactical shooters are usually designed to be inaccurate while moving and more accurate while in crouching or prone stances. Jumping, which is seldom performed in real combat, is de-emphasized or even omitted, though some games may offer limited climbing or vaulting mechanics. Many tactical shooters feature "leaning", where the player can lean left or right to peek and fire around corners or behind cover without exposing the rest of their body to attack. A majority of tactical shooters have sight mechanics, where players are able to either "hip-fire" (fire without aiming the weapon's sights), which is less accurate but gives a wider view of the area; or "aim down sights" (ADS) for better accuracy, increased zoom, or an aiming reticle, at the cost of restricted visibility and camera sensitivity. To highlight their emphases on realism, tactical shooters feature limited or minimalistic HUD elements compared to most other shooters, the extent of which can vary depending on the game, difficulty, or selected options, ranging from the absence of a minimap or health bar to the full or partial absence of HUD staples such as crosshairs and ammunition counters.

Some tactical shooters make use of squad-based tactics, where the player character (and usually also the enemy) is supported by a team of allied units, typically computer-controlled. While early tactical shooters had simple AI allies who followed set pathing, AI in later games has evolved with more complex responses such as autonomously seeking cover. In games with sufficiently robust AI, the player character may be able to issue commands to AI squadmates, such as ordering them to cover an advance, flank a position, or clear an area of hostiles such as in Brothers in Arms. Some games in the genre allow players to plan their team's movements before a mission, which the AI then follows independently. Multiplayer tactical shooters may allow other players to assist each other either in the same squad or even commanding their own squads, allowing human players to strategize and coordinate more effectively compared to the limited commands available for AI. Team tactics are emphasized in tactical shooters more than other shooter genres, and thus accurate aiming and quick reflexes are not always sufficient for victory.

The game's setting and scope are usually reflected in the game's level designs and mechanics. For example, in SWAT 4, the player leads a contemporary SWAT team against criminals and terrorists in an East Coast metropolis; thus, it follows that most levels in the game are inspired by the urban and suburban Eastern United States, with most levels set indoors, and most level layouts and gameplay focusing on the close-quarters combat that SWAT teams specialize in; and therefore, the game features equipment that work within the game's setting, such as door wedges to seal doors and tasers to stun and arrest enemies. The setting itself defines how "realistic" the game may be: a game depicting modern warfare set in the present may use modern combat tactics with realistic weapons, while a game set in the near future or a different universe may incorporate elements of science fiction and use fictional or theoretical advanced technology, while still using generally sensible combat tactics. The setting may also determine what level objectives the game may feature: the Counter-Strike and Rainbow Six series each depict counterterrorist tactical units, so the objectives seen in most of their games are centered around the typical duties of those units, namely defeating terrorists, rescuing hostages, and defusing bombs.

=== Weapons ===
Tactical shooters feature a wide variety of weapons often modeled on real firearms. The weapons featured depend on the setting, but are generally intended to suit the period (so a game set in World War II would feature period-accurate weaponry and lack modern weapons such as the M16 rifle). Ballistics are typically simulated, as are elements of authenticity such as recoil, motion blur, ear-ringing from explosions, and the feeling of being suppressed. Some developers of tactical shooters may hire technical advisors from military, law enforcement, or firearms specializations to ensure accuracy in in-game depictions.

Simulating actual combat is often sacrificed in favor of balance as well as playability. There may be considerable modifications to in-game weapons and ballistics compared to real life, deliberately done to ensure game balance in multiplayer PvP or competitive modes. For instance, tactical shooters with notable competitive scenes such as the Counter-Strike series typically allow the player to survive multiple bullet hits to the torso (ignoring the bullet resistance of different types of ballistic vests) and even more to the legs (rarely armored in real life), while registering an automatic kill for melee hits to the back (whether punches or knife stabs) and headshots (regardless of weapon caliber, impact point, or whether the target is wearing a helmet).

In contrast to run-and-gun shooters such as Quake which allow players to carry full arsenals, tactical shooters place considerable restrictions on what players may be equipped with, requiring players to carefully select their weapons, equipment, and inventories accordingly. The typical loadout setup used in tactical shooters is that of one "primary weapon" (traditionally a long gun such as a rifle, shotgun, submachine gun, or light machine gun) and one "secondary weapon" (traditionally a sidearm such as a handgun). Grenades of both "explosive"/"lethal" (such as fragmentation grenades and Molotov cocktails) and "tactical"/"non-lethal" (such as stun grenades and smoke grenades) varieties, and useful equipment such as medkits, are often under their own slots, sometimes used with a single input as opposed to individually equipping them. Melee weapons such as combat knives may also have their own slot, though games with more distant or firearm-based combat (such as Arma 3) may lack melee weapons entirely. Rocket launchers and grenade launchers, occasionally having their own "launcher" slot, may have varying focuses compared to their "general purpose" depictions in arcade shooters, such as dedicated ATGM and MANPADS launchers, or underbarrel anti-personnel grenade launchers that can be equipped on some rifles and carbines. In many instances, the player's selected class affects what weapons are available to them; a rifleman class, for example, may only have rifles and carbines as their available primary weapons. This prevents "jack-of-all-trades" loadouts where one player can carry everything they need, and promotes cooperation between players with different loadouts and classes

In most tactical shooters, the basic weapon and equipment slots are the extent of the player's inventory; however, in some more expansive games, such as the Arma series, individual items such as magazines for equipped weapons are carried in the player's inventory, which must be managed to mitigate its effects on the player character's weight. Carry weight is a game mechanic in many tactical shooters, increasing with the weapons, armor, or items carried by the player character, and affecting movement speed, stamina, time taken to aim down sights, and the ability to focus while aiming. The weight mechanic forces players to properly manage their inventory and choose whether they value mobility, effectiveness, or protection, preventing "jack-of-all-trades" loadouts where one player can carry everything they need, and promoting cooperation between players with different loadouts and classes. In many tactical shooters featuring a weight system, weight is always a present factor that must be dealt with; however, in some, such as the Counter-Strike series, weight only applies to what is currently equipped—so a machine gun would be "heavier" than a knife, despite them both being carried by the player—meaning loopholes around weight restrictions may be found, such as equipping a knife to move faster.

Many tactical shooters (especially modern releases) feature varying degrees of weapon customization. In most modern tactical shooters, this is limited to the addition of firearm attachments such as a variety of scopes, holographic sights, laser sights, flashlights, foregrips, and suppressors. In games where weight is a factor, the player's equipped attachments may add to their character's weight. In less-grounded shooters, weapon customization may extend to stylized weapon camouflage skins and keychain-style "charms" (as seen in Rainbow Six Siege), while in more detailed and comprehensive shooters, individual components of the gun itself such as the barrel shroud and stock may be customized or replaced (as seen in Escape from Tarkov).

Despite generally aiming for realism and accuracy, some tactical shooters tend to make exceptions with their weapon accuracy. "Akimbo" (dual wielding) of firearms is generally rare in tactical shooters, yet it still appears as an option occasionally, such as in Counter-Strike with weapons ranging from small pistols to long-barreled shotguns. The Desert Eagle, despite being unsuitable for actual military applications, is still frequently found in many tactical shooters as a high-powered handgun option. Outdated weapons such as the AK-47 are often seen in modern military service in some games, despite them being mostly replaced by modern times (the AK-47 in particular having been replaced in Soviet Army service by the AK-74 in the 1970s). Experimental weapons, such as the OICW, are commonly seen in many titles, such as the Ghost Recon and Delta Force series, and modern tactical shooters have tended to place more of an emphasis on the future of warfare through the implementation of drones and micro-cameras.

== History ==
Tom Clancy's Rainbow Six (1998) has been considered "the first true tactical shooter".

Features now common to the tactical shooters genre originated in the late 1980s and early 1990s, starting with Airborne Ranger (1987) by Microprose. Computer Gaming World compared it to the earlier 1985 arcade game Commando, a more typical action shooter of the period, but commented that it was "deeper and more versatile". The game featured a limited inventory which had to be carefully managed, a variety of mission types which often promoted guile over violence, and the impetus to plan ahead and outmaneuver the enemy—all of which are features common in the tactical shooter genre as a whole. Airborne Ranger was followed by Special Forces (1992), also by Microprose, which first introduced squad mechanics to the genre. Also considered an early tactical shooter is Hostages (1988) by Infogrames, in which the player takes the role of French GIGN operatives to besiege and raid an embassy that has been taken over by terrorists, which Destructoid compared to the later Rainbow Six franchise of tactical shooters.

The next technical breakthrough came in 1993 with the release of SEAL Team by Electronic Arts. This game already offered many of the basic features associated with the genre, including utilizing support elements and vehicular units, and running a real-time simulated environment (with 3D Vector graphics) that reacts to the player's actions. Experiments in tactical shooter design were sparse over the next five years, and included Terra Nova: Strike Force Centauri, released in 1996—one of first 3D-rendered games with squad-oriented gameplay.

The first major successes of the genre came in 1998, with games such as Hidden & Dangerous, Rainbow Six, Ghost Recon, and Delta Force, which are credited for defining and refining the genre. Other influences on the genre included games such as the SOCOM series, as well as the SWAT series, a tactical shooter spin-off of the Police Quest series of adventure games.

Rainbow Six (1998) in particular has been credited as a revolutionary game which defined the conventions of the tactical shooter genre. The game was inspired by (and, before its connection with Tom Clancy's novel Rainbow Six, initially focused on) the FBI Hostage Rescue Team. The game was designed to emphasize strategy in a way that would be fun for players without the best reflexes. The series has since become a benchmark for the genre in terms of detail and accuracy.

Some of the most notable tactical shooters have been total conversion mods of first-person shooters which have been released for free. Infiltration, a total conversion of Unreal Tournament (1999), has been described as "turning Unreal Tournament's wild cartoon action into a harrowing game of cat and mouse". Infiltration has been noted for detailed aiming system including hip-fire and sights while lacking a crosshair, different movement stances (running, walking, crouching, and prone, leaning around corners), and a weapon customization feature with a weight penalty. Counter-Strike (2000), a mod of Valve's Half-Life (1998), was the most popular multiplayer game of its era, in spite of the release of arcade-style first-person shooters with more advanced graphics engines such as Unreal Tournament 2003. One of the developers of the Half-Life expansions was Gearbox Software, who later released the game Brothers in Arms: Road to Hill 30 (2005) that further defined the genre. Critics praised the game for not only adding realism to its first-person shooter gameplay, but also in its unique tactical gameplay that allows players to command soldiers and teams during combat.

=== Decline and resurgence ===
By the late 2000s, casual military shooters such as Call of Duty 4: Modern Warfare (2007) began to prove more popular than classic-style shooters such as Quake and Unreal, although the field of true tactical shooters was largely neglected by developers since the mid-to-late 2000s. At that point, most tactical shooter franchises such as SWAT and SOCOM were discontinued, while developers such as Red Storm and Sierra went defunct or were absorbed by larger companies.

Traditionally tactical shooter series like Rainbow Six and Ghost Recon drifted away from tactical realism towards cinematic action-centered themes, as can be witnessed by contemporary Rainbow Six sequels, which completely do away with the series' pre-action planning stage (last seen in 2003's Rainbow Six 3: Raven Shield) and the series' established counterterrorism setting as of Rainbow Six Siege (2015, in updates released later) and Rainbow Six Extraction (2022); and the futuristic settings of Ghost Recon: Future Soldier (2012), which features invisibility cloaks and shoulder-mounted anti-tank rockets. Even the Spec Ops series, which began as a brutally realistic, almost impenetrably-so, tactical shooter, was transformed into a more cinematic story-focused generic third-person shooter.

In the 2010s, the tactical shooter genre underwent a significant resurgence, propelled by the successful releases of Arma 3 (2013), Insurgency (2014), and Squad (2015) early in the decade. This revival gained further traction with later titles, including Rising Storm 2: Vietnam (2017), Insurgency: Sandstorm (2018), and Ready or Not (2021), which reinvigorated the genre through the late 2010s and early 2020s. Further examples into the 2020s include Gray Zone Warfare (2024), Bohemia Interactive's Arma 4, announced in early 2025 with a planned release in 2027, and Bellum (2025), developed by Astarte Industries with a team comprising former developers from Arma, Squad, and Ready or Not. Tactical shooters continue to sustain a dedicated fanbase, primarily driven by indie developers who emphasize the genre's focus on strategic gameplay and realism.

Outside typical tactical shooters, the game mechanics and realistic simulations of the genre have also been used in battle royale games, extraction shooters, and esports-centric games. However, as few of them feature the game design staples of tactical shooters (such as strategic planning, squad-level tactics, slow-paced gameplay, and a realistic premise), they are usually not considered as such. Casual games like Rainbow Six Siege and Battlefield V have also demonstrated "back to roots" philosophies, such as the removal of regenerative health and "3D spotting" in the latter.

Tactical shooters have also been released as virtual reality games, such as Hot Dogs, Horseshoes & Hand Grenades, Pavlov VR, Onward, and Breachers VR.

== Military use ==
Virtual Battlespace is a series of tactical shooter simulators developed by Arma series creators Bohemia Interactive, used for infantry training by the United States military and several NATO militaries. Its Pointman user interface combines head tracking, a motion-sensitive gamepad and sliding foot pedals to increase the precision and level of control over one's avatar, enabling users to more realistically aim their weapon and practice muzzle discipline, to take measured steps when moving around obstacles or cover, and to continuously control their postural height to make better use of cover and concealment.

== See also ==
- Military simulation
- MilSim
