= Battle Academy =

Video game series

- Cover art for the first game
- Developer: Slitherine Software
- Publisher: Slitherine Software
- Platforms: Windows, macOS, iOS, Xbox 360
- Release: BBC Battle Academy; August 5, 2010 (Win); September 6, 2011 (Mac); March 14, 2012 (iOS); December 12, 2014 (Xbox 360); Battle Academy 2 September 11, 2014 (Win); October 23, 2014 (iOS); November 20, 2014 (Mac)
- Genre: Turn-based strategy
- Modes: Single-player, multiplayer

Battle Academy is a series of two turn-based strategy video games developed and published by Slitherine Software in the 2010s. The first game, BBC Battle Academy (originally Battlefield Academy), was released in 2010. The second game, Battle Academy 2: Eastern Front, was released in 2014.

== Gameplay ==
The Battle Academy series is a pair of World War II turn-based strategy games. In the first game, the player leads the Allied forces against the Axis powers through a series of missions in three campaigns: North Africa, Battle of Normandy, and Battle of the Bulge. The second game features four campaigns set in the Eastern Front, two played from the German side, the other two from the Soviet side. Play-by-mail multiplayer is featured in both games. Battle Academy 2 also supports co-op multiplayer.

== Release ==
Battle Academy was developed and published by Slitherine Software, a studio based in Epsom, England. The first game was released on August 5, 2010, for Windows as Battlefield Academy. It is based on a 2004 BBC browser Flash game. A month after release, Electronic Arts claimed the game was infringing copyright because the name was too similar to its Battlefield series. Slitherine was planning at the time ports and an expansion that were delayed because of the dispute. Ports for Nintendo DS, PlayStation Portable, and PlayStation Vita were planned but never released. On September 6, 2011, the game was renamed to BBC Battle Academy, and a macOS port was released at the same time. An iPad port was released on March 14, 2012, and an Xbox 360 port was released on December 12, 2014. Six expansions were released as downloadable content (DLC) for the game.

Battle Academy 2: Eastern Front was released for Windows on September 11, 2014, for iPad on October 23, 2014, and for macOS on November 20, 2014. Battle of Kursk expansion was released on April 2, 2015.

== Reception ==
BBC Battle Academy

Review scores
Publication	Score
GameStar	72/100 (PC)
Armchair General	85% (iPad)
Digitally Downloaded	3.5/5 (PC/Mac); 4.5/5 (iPad)
Slide to Play	3/4 (iPad)
Softpedia	4/5 (PC)

Battle Academy 2: Eastern Front

Aggregate score
Aggregator	Score
Metacritic	77/100 (PC); 80/100 (iOS)

Review scores
Publication	Score
Eurogamer	8/10 (PC)
IGN	8/10 (PC)
Pocket Gamer	4.5/5 (iPad)
Digitally Downloaded	4.5/5 (PC); 4/5 (iPad)
Pocket Tactics	4/5 (iPad)
Softpedia	4/5 (PC)

=== BBC Battle Academy ===
Digitally Downloaded summarized the PC/Mac version: "[...] ultimately Battle Academy is a little light for the wargame veteran, and a little complex for the casual strategy gamer, it should be reasonably fun for both groups, even if it's not a game either would come back to six or twelve months down the track."

Andrei Dumitrescu of Softpedia said that Battle Academy delivers "[...] a simple and solid set of gameplay mechanics that can be an excellent entry point for those who have not played any other titles in the genre so far [...]"

Erik Carlson of Slide to Play summarized: "Battle Academy is for the hardcore strategy gamer only. The high price, high difficulty and occasional technical hiccups will dissuade many. But for those of you who are willing to take the challenge, you'll encounter a highly engaging, absorbing and lengthy experience the likes of which has rarely been seen on iOS."

Jim Cobb of Armchair General reviewed the Operation Market Garden and Blitzkrieg France expansions and gave them a rating of 88%. Cobb said that "[t]he patch and expansions make what was a nice game into something that is almost a classic." In 2012, he reviewed Operation Sealion expansion and gave it a rating of 92% and said it "[...] stands out as the most challenging, innovative and enjoyable so far." In 2013, he reviewed Rommel in Normandy expansion and gave it a rating of 87% and said it "[...] is the most exciting and intriguing campaign so far."

In a 2020 retrospective review, Tim Stone of Rock Paper Shotgun said that the game "has aged astonishingly well" and that "[...] BA has a knack for drama that Panzer General-likes like Order of Battle and Panzer Corps lack."

=== Battle Academy 2: Eastern Front ===
Battle Academy 2: Eastern Front received "generally favorable" reviews according to review aggregator Metacritic.

Tim Stone of Rock Paper Shotgun wrote in a preview: "[...] combat is certainly more interesting and more nuanced than before, but obviously if you want real detail and realism in your T-34 vs Tiger tussles (and don't mind the consequent increase in workload/confusion potential) you're far better off with a Graviteam or a Battlefront product."

Rob P. of Digitally Downloaded summarized the PC version: "While it shares a significant amount of DNA with the first game, the clever maps, huge unit roster, and brilliant skirmish generator make Battle Academy 2 one of the most entertaining tactical-level wargames on the market today."

Davide Pessach of Eurogamer said that "Battle Academy 2 is a very focused wargame; perfect for anyone willing to strategize without spending hours going through text walls in a manual. The graphical quality could be off-putting, but mechanics and gameplay are top-notch and perfectly sound."

Matt Thrower of Pocket Gamer called the game "[a] pitch perfect, pick up and play blend of strategy and accessibility, history and thrills".
