= Star Hammer: The Vanguard Prophecy =

2015 video game

- Steam store art
- Developer: Black Lab Games
- Publisher: Slitherine Software
- Platforms: Windows, macOS, iOS, Xbox One, PlayStation 4
- Release: June 4, 2015 (Windows, Mac); December 10, 2015 (iOS); August 25, 2016 (Xbox One); September 2, 2016 (PS4)
- Genre: Turn-based strategy
- Mode: Single-player

Star Hammer: The Vanguard Prophecy is a science fiction turn-based strategy video game developed by Black Lab Games and published by Slitherine Software for Windows and macOS on June 4, 2015. It is the second game in the Star Hammer series after Star Hammer Tactics.

== Gameplay ==
Star Hammer is set in 2174 AD during a war between humans and a race of cephalopods called Nautilids. The game is a 3D turn-based strategy game that uses a simultaneous turn structure (WEGO) where opponents confirm commands and are then executed at the same time.

== Release ==
Star Hammer was developed by Black Lab Games, a studio based in Perth, Australia. The Vanguard Prophecy is a follow-up to Star Hammer Tactics, a PlayStation mini and iPad game. An Xbox One version was released on August 26, 2016, and a PlayStation 4 version was released on September 2, 2016.

== Reception ==
Reception

Aggregate score
Aggregator	Score
Metacritic	69/100 (PC)

Review scores
Publication	Score
4Players	57/100
Eurogamer	7/10
IGN	6.5/10
PCGamesN	7/10
Pocket Gamer	4/5
Armchair General	89%
Digitally Downloaded	4.5/5
Pelit	79/100
Pocket Tactics	4/5 (iPad)

Star Hammer: The Vanguard Prophecy received "mixed or average" reviews according to review aggregator Metacritic.

Patrick Baker of Armchair General summarized: "Star Hammer: The Vanguard Prophecy is a very good game. It is fun, and involving to play and well worth the $19.99 price tag. The game can only be made better by adding a ship design module, a true scenario editor and a multi-player function."

Matt Purslow of PCGamesN summarized: "Star Hammer's combat systems are truly exceptional, but they’re trapped in a bland, forgettable campaign."

Alex Connolly of Pocket Tactics summarized: "Aural nitpicking aside, and despite a distinct lack of multiplayer, Star Hammer: The Vanguard Prophecy is a quiet gem."

Richard Talbot of Wargamer said: "[...] overall I have so far really enjoyed Star Hammer. The game looks good and the WEGO turn system works really well.

Star Hammer won best game award at West Australian Screen Awards.

== See also ==
- Battlestar Galactica Deadlock, the next strategy game by the same developer and publisher
