= Ben Weider =

Canadian sports businessman (1923–2008)

Ben Weider OC CQ CD
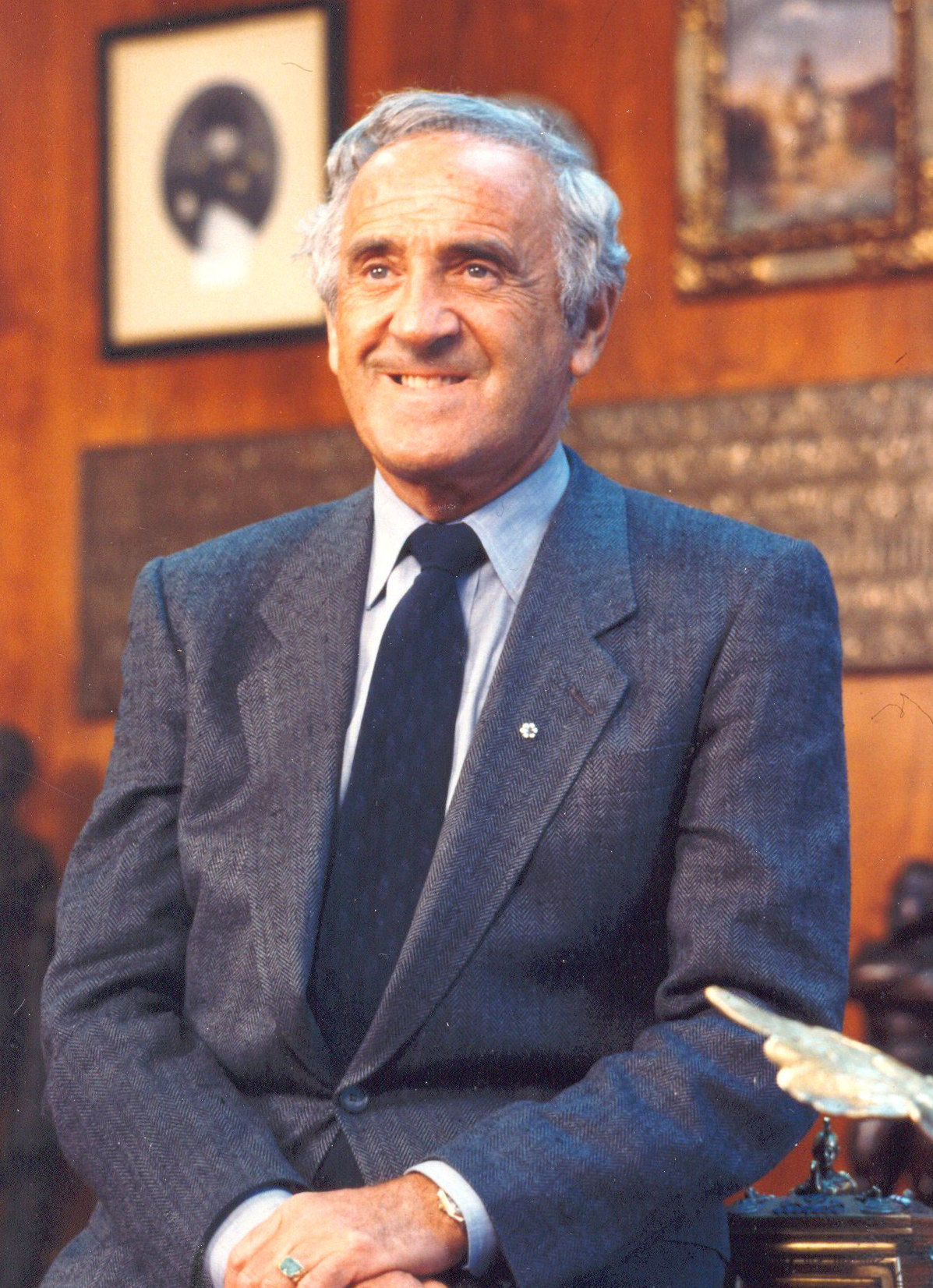
- Born: February 1, 1923; Montreal, Quebec, Canada
- Died: October 17, 2008 (aged 85); Montreal, Quebec, Canada
- Other name: The President
- Occupation: President of the IFBB
- Known for: Co-creating the IFBB
- Height: 5 ft 11 in (1.80 m)
- Relatives: Joe Weider (brother, deceased); Eric Weider (son)
- Website: www.benweider.com

Benjamin Weider, OC CQ CD (1 February 1923 – 17 October 2008) was a Canadian soldier, author, historian (Napoleonic history), fitness proponent, benefactor of the arts, and entrepreneur. He co-founded the International Federation of BodyBuilders (IFBB) alongside his brother Joe Weider. The Weiders also founded many successful businesses including gyms, nutritional supplements and magazines such as Muscle & Fitness.

He wrote several books about Napoleon, including best seller The Murder of Napoleon, translated to 45 languages.

== Family ==
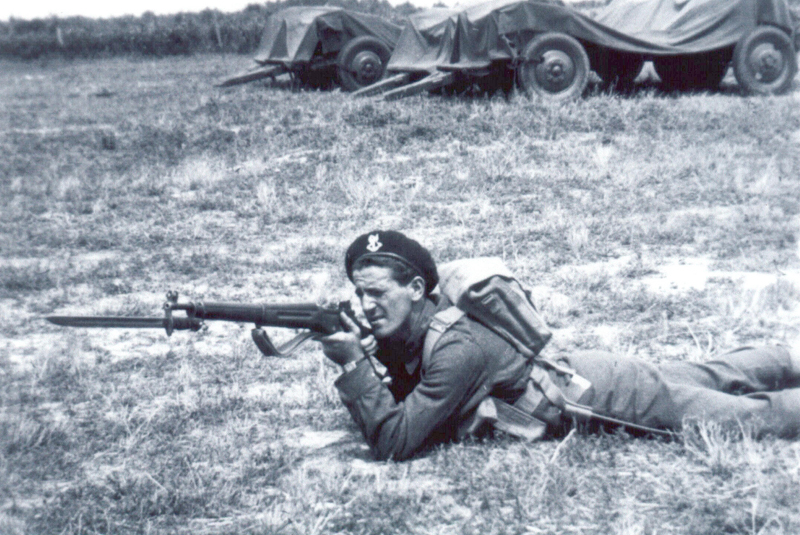
Ben Weider during his service in the 6th Duke of Connaught's Royal Canadian Hussars, 1942.

Benjamin Weider was born 1 February 1923 in the old Jewish immigrant quarter ("the Main") of Montréal (Quebec, Canada), the third son of Louis and Anna Weider, Polish Jewish emigrants from the town of Kurów (Poland). Ben left school at 13 to work in restaurants and factories.

== Military service ==
In 1942, he enlisted in the Canadian Army, serving in the 6th Duke of Connaught's Royal Canadian Hussars, in which he did intelligence work as a member of the Canadian Intelligence Corps during World War II.

== Fitness business ==
Weider and his brother, started a mimeographed magazine (Your Fitness) to promote weightlifting and sell exercise equipment, which expanded into other titles including Flex, Muscle & Fitness, Men's Fitness, and Fit Pregnancy. The magazines were sold in 2003 to American Media.

The brothers are attributed with creating bodybuilding as a sport, where the focus was on the form and fitness of the body shaped by the exercise. In 1965 the brothers formed the first Mr Olympia contest at the Brooklyn Academy of Music (New York City, New York, United States), an alternative to the Mr. Universe competition.

In 1968, the brothers brought Arnold Schwarzenegger, who was then an unknown Austrian bodybuilder, to California.

He co-founded the International Federation of BodyBuilding & Fitness (IFBB) along with brother Joe Weider, and was its president until he announced his retirement on 29 October 2006. He also co-founded (1936) and ran a physical fitness and sporting goods business from Montreal with his brother, which bears their family name.

Ben Weider opened a number of gyms around the world, including in Lebanon.

== Historical research ==
Weider was known as an advocate of the theory that Napoleon was assassinated with arsenic poisoning by a member of his entourage during his exile in Saint Helena. Weider had even obtained authenticated Napoleon hair samples and arranged for forensic tests that showed that Napoleon had been poisoned with arsenic. He co-authored several Napoleonic history books including, Assassination at St. Helena, Assassination at St. Helena Revisited and The Murder of Napoleon. The Murder of Napoleon became one of the best-selling history books of all time, now with editions in 45 languages.

Weider also founded the International Napoleonic Society, of which he was the president, and wrote numerous articles for this organization.

Weider owned an extensive collection of Napoleon memorabilia. He donated this collection to the Montreal Museum of Fine Arts, making it one of the largest collections of its kind in the world.

In 2006, the Weider History Group, a wholly owned subsidiary of Weider Health and Fitness Inc, acquired Civil War Times in an acquisition of eleven history-related magazines from another magazine chain, along with America's Civil War, Armchair General, Civil War Times, Vietnam, etc. These acquisitions caused controversies over a change in editorial direction, including the resignation of the Civil War Times's editor (Chris Lewis), and general criticisms of anti-Palestine bias.

== Religion ==
Weider was a Jewish Anglophone. He financially assisted the rebuilding of Montreal's Mary, Queen of the World Cathedral. Jean-Claude Turcotte, the Roman Catholic Cardinal, said of him that Ben Weider was "One of the greatest Montrealers I ever knew".

== Awards ==
Weider was made a Member of the Order of Canada in 1975 (subsequently promoted to Officer in 2006), a Knight of the National Order of Quebec in 2000, a Knight of the French Legion of Honor on 12 October 2000 (for his research work into Napoleon's death), a member of the Quebec Sports Hall of Fame, and a Commander of the Venerable Order of St. John (for his charitable work promoting youth fitness and health worldwide). In 1984, Ben Weider was also nominated for a Nobel Peace prize. The Revolutionary and Napoleonic Studies program of Florida State University's History Department created the Ben Weider Eminent Scholar Chair in Napoleonic History and the Ben Weider Chair of French Revolutionary History, supported by Weider's bequests.

From 1998 to 2005, Weider was Honorary Lieutenant Colonel of the 62nd (Shawinigan) Field Artillery Regiment, RCA. In 2005, he was promoted to Honorary Colonel of that military unit.

In 2003, he received the first Lifetime Achievement Award from Club Industry's Fitness Business Pro in 2003.

In 2008, he was given the Lifetime Achievement Award at the 20th Anniversary Arnold Classic.

In 2014, he was inducted into the International Sports Hall of Fame along with Joe and Betty Weider.

== Death ==
Weider died on October 17, 2008, at the Jewish General Hospital in Montreal.

== In popular culture ==
The film Bigger was released in 2018 on the life of Ben Weider and his brother Joe Weider.

== Published works ==
=== Books ===
- Weider B., and Forshufvud S., Assassination At St. Helena: The Poisoning of Napoleon Bonaparte (1978). ISBN 9780888360281
- Weider B., and Hapgood D. The Murder of Napoleon (1982).ISBN 978-0865530355
- Weider, B., and Kennedy, R. Superpump!: Hardcore Women's Bodybuilding (1986). ISBN 9780806948003
- Weider, B. and Forshufvud, S. Assassination at St. Helena Revisited (1995). ISBN 978-0471126775
- Weider, B. The Murder of Napoleon (1998).ISBN 0312925484
- Weider, B. Louis Cyr: Amazing Canadian (2000). ISBN 0926888099
- Weider, B., Weider, J., and Gastelu, D., The Edge (2002). Weider, B. Napoleon: The Man that Shaped Europe (2003). ISBN 1583331441
- Weider B., Weider J., Schwarzenegger A., Brothers of Iron: Building the Weider Empire (2006) ISBN 1596701242
- Franceschi, Michel; Weider, Ben (2007). The wars against Napoleon: debunking the myth of the Napoleonic Wars. New York: Savas Beatie. ISBN 1-932714-37-5.

=== Journal articles ===
- Weider B., and Fournier J.H., Activation analyses of authenticated hairs of Napoleon Bonaparte confirm arsenic poisoning (1999).
- Weider B., and Fournier J., The Death of Napoleon (1999).

== See also ==
- Jake Wood (bodybuilding)

Military offices
Preceded by Antonio Lamer	Honorary Lieutenant Colonel of the 62nd (Shawinigan) Field Artillery Regiment, RCA; 1998–2005	Succeeded by Jacques Duchesneau
Preceded by Gérard Dufresne	Honorary Colonel of the 62nd (Shawinigan) Field Artillery Regiment, RCA; 2005–2008	Succeeded by Vacant
