= André Charette =

Canadian bodybuilder

- Professional bodybuilder

Personal info
- Born: Canada

Best statistics

Professional (Pro) career
- Pro-debut: Canada Pro Cup
- Best win: IFBB World Amateur Championships – Lightweight (1992)
- Active: 1984–2012

André Charette is a Canadian professional bodybuilder who competed nationally and internationally between 1984 and 2012. He is best known for winning the IFBB World Amateur Bodybuilding Championships (lightweight division) in 1992 in Graz, Austria, after securing multiple national titles in Canada.

== Career ==
Little has been published about Charette's early life, including his date and place of birth. He began bodybuilding competitively in Canada in 1984, progressing into the national amateur ranking under the Canadian Bodybuilding Federation (CBBF).

Charette first gained national attention when he won the CBBF Junior Lightweight title at the 1984 Canadian Championships. He obtained the national Lightweight championship in 1987.

In 1992, Charette represented Canada at the IFBB World Amateur Bodybuilding Championships held in Graz, Austria. Although he did not succeed in placing among top finalists at pro level, he won the Lightweight division, earning the IFBB World title and receiving Ben Weider's "Most Improved" award at the same event. After his IFBB competitions, He competed in several pro contests, including the Canada Pro Cup and the Ironman Pro Invitational.

Bodybuilder Charles Poliquin described in his 1997 magazine, The Poliguin Principles, would often train twice a day for in 40-minute sessions, distinct from most amateur bodybuilders at the time, who would train once a day for around an hour.

== Bodybuilding titles ==
Year	Competition	Division	Placement	Ref.
1984	CBBF Canadian Championships	Junior Lightweight	1st	
1987	CBBF Canadian Championships	Lightweight	1st	
1989	CBBF Canadian Championships	Lightweight	3rd	
1992	IFBB World Amateur Championships (Graz, Australia)	Lightweight	1st	
1993	IFBB Canada Pro Cup	Professional	13th	
1996	IFBB Ironman Pro Invitational	Professional	13th	
1999	IFBB World Amateur Championships	Lightweight	12th	
2012	IFBB World Amateur Championships	Lightweight	Did not place	

== See also ==
- List of World Amateur Bodybuilding Championships medalists
