= Field of Glory =

Computer strategy game series

- Board game cover art, also used for the first video game edition
- Genres: Turn-based strategy Grand strategy
- Developers: Hexwar; Byzantine Games; AGEod
- Publishers: Slitherine Software; Matrix Games
- Platforms: Windows, OS X
- First release: Field of Glory; 2009
- Latest release: Field of Glory: Kingdoms; 2024

Field of Glory is a series of turn-based strategy games published by British company Slitherine Software for personal computers. The series is based on a 2008 miniature wargame.

== Tabletop Wargame ==
Field of Glory is a 2008 miniature wargame for creating ancient and medieval tabletop battles. It was designed by Richard Bodley Scott and published by Slitherine Software and Osprey Publishing. The release of the game and two companion books (Rise of Rome and Storm of Arrows) were announced on December 20, 2007, for February 2008. A third edition was released on October 17, 2017.

Wargamer gave the game a positive review: "On a 1 to 10 scale I’d give Field of Glory a skosh over 9, but only for intermediate or advanced players. Given that most players who already compete in ancients tourneys are at this level anyway, this should not be a problem, but beginners will likely get lost in the complexity if not nurtured."

In 2017, Wargamer reviewed the third edition and gave it a positive review: "For current Field of Glory players this strongly recommended, but for everyone else it's optional."

== Video games ==
Release timeline
2009	Field of Glory
2010
2011
2012
2013
2014
2015
2016
2017	Field of Glory II
2018
2019	Field of Glory: Empires
2020
2021	Field of Glory II: Medieval
2022
2023
2024	Field of Glory: Kingdoms

Aggregate review scores As of February 22, 2023.
Game	Metacritic
Field of Glory II	84
Field of Glory: Empires	76
Field of Glory II: Medieval	75

=== Field of Glory ===
Field of Glory is the first game in the series, a digital version of the wargame. It was released on November 19, 2009, for Windows and developed by British studio Hexwar. An OS X port was released on June 30, 2010. It was ported by Freeverse Inc. Four expansion packs were released in 2010: Rise of Rome, Storm of Arrows, Immortal Fire, and Swords & Scimitars. Three expansions packs were released in 2011: Legions Triumphant, Eternal Empire, and Decline and Fall. Two expansion packs were released in 2016: Oath of Fealty and Wolves from the Sea. Alongside the last two expansions, the game was remade for the Unity game engine.

Armchair General gave the game a rating of 88% and said: "Overall, Field of Glory continues Slitherene’s tradition of fine-tuned, fast-playing games. FoG is easy to play and learn but more difficult to master." Digitally Downloaded gave the game four out of five stars and called it a "hugely entertaining game". Roberto Bertoni of Eurogamer Italy gave the game six out of ten and said: "Field of Glory is nothing more than an electronic board game. All is pretty tasteless but also very functional. Some flaws in the AI make the game more enjoyable in multiplayer rather than in single player." PC Gamer called Field of Glory the best light strategy game of 2009.

=== Field of Glory II ===
Field of Glory II was released on October 12, 2017, developed by Byzantine Games. It uses the same game engine as Byzantine's previous games: Sengoku Jidai and Pike and Shot. Several DLC packs were released: Immortal Fire in 2017, Legions Triumphant, Age of Belisarius, and Rise of Persia in 2018, Wolves at the Gate in 2019, and Swifter than Eagles in 2023.

Field of Glory II received generally favorable reviews upon its release. It holds an average of 84/100 on aggregate website Metacritic.

Rock Paper Shotgun wrote about the beta version: "Like its forerunners, FoGII produces gripping battle after gripping battle." Wargamer said that the game "[...] is not only well worth while, but especially when compared to the first edition and other competing products, an absolute must buy."

=== Field of Glory: Empires ===
Field of Glory: Empires was developed by AGEod and released on July 11, 2019. It is set from 310 BC until the end of 2nd century AD in Ancient Rome. A DLC pack, Persia 550 – 330 BCE, was released on May 21, 2020.

==== Reception ====
Field of Glory: Empires received generally favorable reviews upon its release. It holds an average of 76/100 on aggregate website Metacritic. The game was often compared to Imperator: Rome, another 2019 strategy game about the Roman Empire.

Strategy Gamer said that "Empires lacks the breadth Imperator has striven for and is a few years behind what Total War is doing these days, but it's a smartly made game and gives a deeper military experience for those who prefer those aspects. It's definitely one to consider and an excellent new contender in the grand strategy space."

Bill Gray of Wargamer gave the game a positive review and called it "one of the best ancient grand strategy games on the market".

Jörg Luibl of 4Players said that "This is dreary, sometimes plain boring and frustrating. Even if you get into the mechanics thanks to YouTube-videos (!), there are way too many shortcomings."

Tim Stone of Rock Paper Shotgun summarized: "I'd be surprised if Field of Glory: Empires didn't go down as one of 2019s best grand strategy offerings. At the very least it looks certain to be remembered as an essential add-on for the finest Ancients tactical wargame around."

Gamepressure listed Empires among the best strategy games of 2019.

=== Field of Glory II: Medieval ===
Battle scene in Field of Glory II: Medieval

Field of Glory II: Medieval, a sequel to Field of Glory II, was released on February 4, 2021, and developed by Byzantine Games. It is set in the medieval era covering years from 1040 to 1270 AD. Several DLC packs were released: Reconquista and Swords and Scimitars in 2021, Storm of Arrows, Rise of the Swiss, and Sublime Porte in 2022.

Field of Glory II: Medieval received generally favorable reviews upon its release. It holds an average of 75/100 on aggregate website Metacritic.

Jonathan Bolding of PC Gamer said that the game doesn't "feel medieval", elaborating: "The ruleset's emphasis on flanking maneuvers over numerical advantage makes a lot of sense in the ancients period, but it feels silly when three units of elite infantry can't make a squad of enemy recruits flee in a single simultaneous assault."

Bill Gray of Wargamer gave the game a positive review and said it is "easy to learn, easy to play, plays realistically" and "it looks spectacular".

=== Field of Glory: Kingdoms ===
Field of Glory: Kingdoms, developed by AGEod, was announced on May 10, 2022. It is said to be similar to Field of Glory: Empires. The game was set to be released in 2023, but was eventually released on June 4, 2024.

Strategy and War Gaming reviewed the game positively, scoring it 8/10. In the review, praise was given to kingdom management and "well-thought-out mechanics". However, the reviewer noted the game was light on content and campaign types.
