= David T. Zabecki =

United States Army general

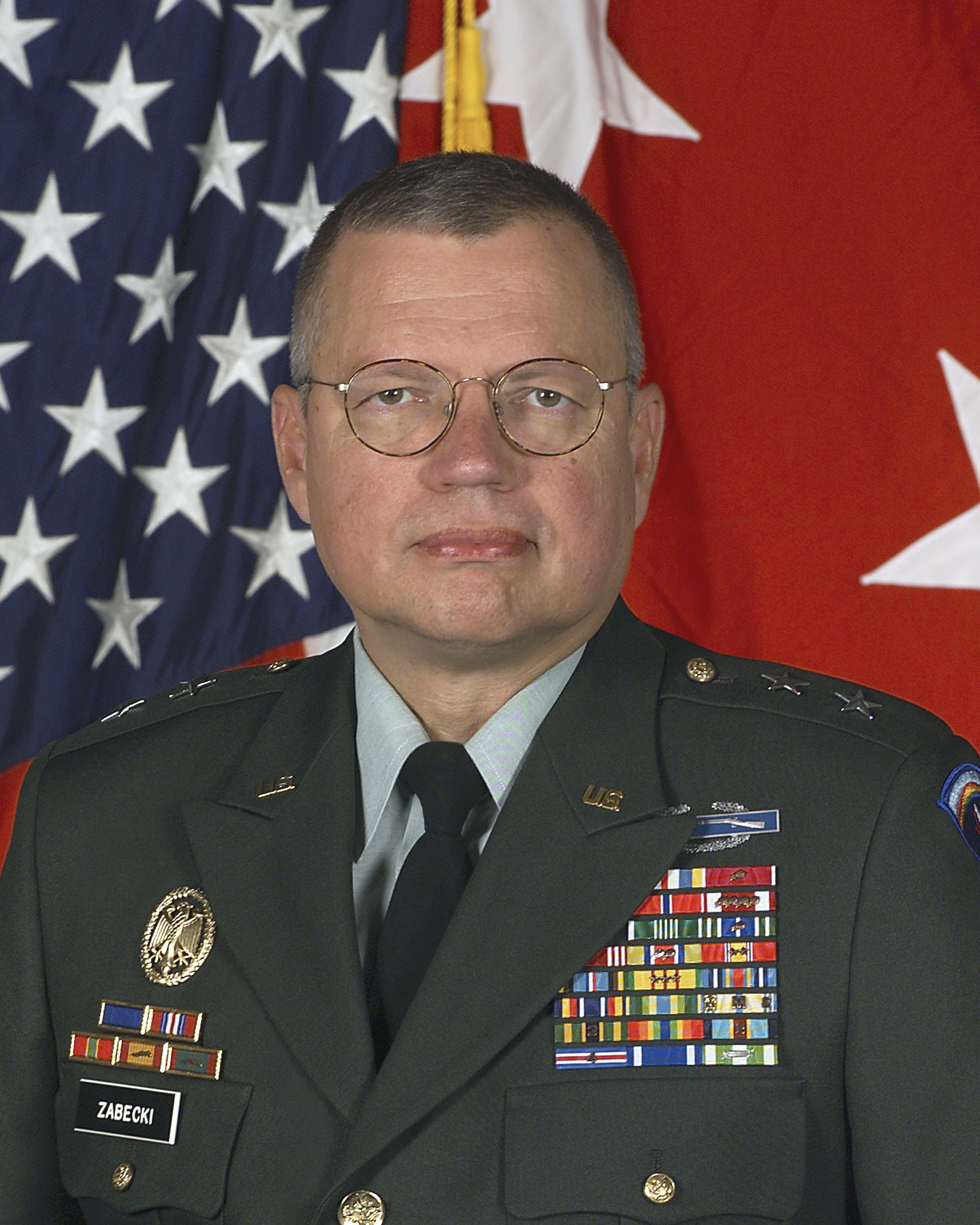
- Zabecki as Major general in 2004
- Born: 1947 (age 78–79)
- Occupations: Historian, author, editor, U.S. Army general (retired)

Academic background
- Education: Xavier University; Florida Institute of Technology; California Coast University; United States Army War College; Royal Military College of Science

Academic work
- Era: 20th century
- Discipline: History
- Sub-discipline: Modern history, military history
- Institutions: Weider History Group; United States Naval Academy; University of Birmingham
- Notable works: Books on the military history of Germany
- Military career
- Allegiance: United States
- Branch: United States Army
- Service years: 1966–2007
- Rank: Major general
- Conflicts: Vietnam War
- Awards: Legion of Merit

David T. Zabecki (born 1947) is an American military historian, author and editor. Zabecki served in the U.S. Army both in the Vietnam War and in United States Army Europe in Germany attaining the rank of major general. Zabecki holds PhDs in engineering and in military science. He is the author, editor and translator of several books on the military history of Germany, including World War I and World War II.

== Education and career ==
Zabecki entered the U.S. Army in 1966; in 1967−68, he served in the Vietnam War, retiring from active service in 1969. He enrolled at Xavier University, earning bachelor's and master's degrees in history. After obtaining a MS degree in systems management from the Florida Institute of Technology in 1976, Zabecki worked at John Deere both in the United States and West Germany. In 1985 Zabecki joined the United States Army Reserve, and, in 1987, earned a PhD in engineering from the California Coast University. In 1995 Zabecki graduated from the United States Army War College in Carlisle, Pennsylvania. Between 1997 and 2000 he served in senior staff roles with the United States Army Europe (USAREUR) in Germany. From 2000 to 2002 he was deputy chief of the United States Army Reserve in Washington, DC, returning to USAREUR in Germany in 2002/03 as commanding general. In 2004 he obtained a PhD in military science from the Royal Military College of Science (UK).

== Military historian ==
In 2008 Zabecki became senior historian of the Weider History Group, a U.S.-based magazine publishing company focused on military history topics. Since 2009, he has been an honorary senior research fellow in the War Studies Programme the University of Birmingham (UK). In 2012 Zabecki was appointed Leo A. Shifrin Chair in Naval and Military History at the United States Naval Academy in Annapolis, Maryland. He is a member of the New York Academy of Sciences and the Polish Institute of Arts and Sciences of America. Zabecki is editor of the Vietnam Magazine dedicated to the history of the Vietnam War, and a senior historian at the Military History Magazine. Both are published by Weider History Group. He is the author of over 600 articles, some of which appeared at Weider's online property, Historynet.com.

Zabecki is an author, editor and translator of several books on military history. The 2014 English edition of The Schieffen Plan: International Perspectives on the German Strategy for World War I, edited by Hans Ehlert, Michael Epkenhans, and Gerhard P. Gross and translated by Zabecki, received the Arthur Goodzeit Book Award from the New York Military Affairs Symposium. Along with Bruce Condell, he translated and edited Truppenführung ("Handling of Combined-Arms Formations"), the 1933−1934 German Army field manual, published in English by Lynne Rienner Publishers in 2001 as On the German Art of War: Truppenführung: German Army Manual for Unit Command in World War II.

Zabecki served as editor in chief of the four-volume encyclopedia Germany at War: 400 Years of Military History published in 2014 and 2014 by ABC-CLIO. Reviewing the work for the publication of the Reference and User Services Association, Michael Hawkins of the Kent State University notes that the scope of the project that covers "Federal Republic of Germany today, its predecessor states, and the component kingdoms and principalities that combine to form Imperial Germany" is unique. The reviewer writes: "This set does not offer anything new to the field of Germany military history; however, it does a good job of compiling information together into one location. While there are other works that compile sections of German military history into one edited work, this one covers a unique timeline others do not."

== Selected works ==
- On the German Art of War: Truppenführung: German Army Manual for Unit Command in World War II (2001), Lynne Rienner Publishers, ISBN 978-1555879969; as editor and translator
- The German 1918 Offensives: A Case Study in the Operational Level of War (2006), Routledge, ISBN 978-0415558792
- Chief of Staff, Vol. 1: The Principal Officers Behind History's Great Commanders, Napoleonic Wars to World War I (2013), Vol. I−II, Naval Institute Press, ISBN 978-1591149903
- Germany at War: 400 Years of Military History (2014 and 2015), Vol. I−IV, ABC-CLIO, ISBN 978-1598849806; as editor in chief
