= Order of Battle: Pacific =

2015 video game

- Cover art of the physical version
- Developer: The Artistocrats
- Publisher: Slitherine Software
- Designer: Lukas Nijsten
- Composer: Alessandro Ponti
- Platforms: Windows, macOS, PlayStation 4, Xbox One
- Release: April 30, 2015 (Win); July 23, 2015 (Mac); June 23, 2021 (Xbox One); August 19, 2021 (PS4)
- Genre: Computer wargame
- Modes: Single-player, multiplayer

Order of Battle: Pacific is a computer wargame video game developed by The Artistocrats and published by Slitherine Software for Windows on April 30, 2015. The game became free-to-play and was renamed to Order of Battle: World War II on June 14, 2016. The Pacific campaign became downloadable content (DLC) for World War II.

== Gameplay ==
Order of Battle: Pacific is turn-based strategic wargame played on a hex grid. It is set in the Pacific War, a theater during World War II. Two campaigns focus on the Allied and the Japanese sides. The multiplayer supports hotseat and play-by-mail methods.

== Release ==
The development of Order of Battle: Pacific began in early 2012. macOS port was released on July 23, 2015. Xbox One port of World War II was released on June 23, 2021, and PlayStation 4 port on August 19, 2021. Several DLC packs have been released for the game.

== Reception ==
Reception

Aggregate score
| Aggregator | Score |
|---|---|
| Metacritic | 81/100 |

Review scores
| Publication | Score |
|---|---|
| 4Players | 70/100 |
| GameStar | 75/100 |
| IGN | 9/10 (Italy); 8/10 (Spain) |
| PCGamesN | 9/10 |
| Multiplayer.it | 8.5/10 |
| PC Invasion | 8/10 |

Order of Battle: Pacific received "generally favorable reviews" according to review aggregator Metacritic.

Rob Zacny of PCGamesN summarized: "Once I start a scenario, I find it almost impossible to quit until I’ve seen it through to the end. Fast, approachable, and challenging, it is everything I want in a wargame."

Luke Plunkett of Kotaku reviewed Pacific and said: "By drawing on some of the best elements of Panzer General-style games and adding some welcome new additions of its own, OoB:P is a game anyone who likes taking turns to fight the Second World War should look into." Plunkett also reviewed World War II and summarized: "Order of Battle is still a fantastic prospect for anyone down with the idea of turn-based warfare but without the inclination/time for the more serious side of the genre. This is a fast, smart strategy series, and even if some of the campaigns are a bit of a let-down, the beauty of it is that you can just ignore them and focus on the battles you want to fight."

Tim Stone of Rock Paper Shotgun wrote about World War II: "OoB:WW2 encourages pocketing with an easily understood supply mechanic, and is, for my money, a more interesting Panzer General-like than Panzer Corps in consequence. The free base game is poorly provisioned scenario-wise. However, augment it with at least one paid DLC (necessary to unlock modability) and five years' worth of Erik Nygaard's free handcrafted campaigns and you finish up with a high-quality diversion that dwarfs Panzer Corps 2 the way a Jagdtiger dwarfs a Panzer II."
