= List of World Amateur Bodybuilding Championships medalists =

The World Amateur Bodybuilding Championships is an annual event held in cities around the world. This event, formerly known as IFBB Mr. Universe, is a male bodybuilding contest organised by the International Federation of BodyBuilding & Fitness (IFBB) and first held in 1959. The name was changed in 1976 to avoid confusion with the NABBA Mr. Universe.

== IFBB Mr. Universe Winners ==
The IFBB Mr. Universe contest ran from 1959 until 1976, when its name was changed to the World Amateur Bodybuilding Championships.

IFBB Mr. Universe Winners
Year	Name	Country
1959	Eddie Silvestre	Mexico
1960	Chuck Sipes	USA
1961	N/A	N/A
1962	George Eiferman	USA
1963	Harold Poole	USA
1964	Larry Scott	USA
1965	Earl Maynard	England
1966	Dave Draper	USA
1967	Sergio Oliva	Cuba
1968	Frank Zane	USA
1969	Arnold Schwarzenegger	Austria
1970	Franco Columbu	Italy
1971	Albert Beckles	England
1972	Ed Corney	USA
1973	Lou Ferrigno	USA
1974	Lou Ferrigno	USA
1975	Ken Waller	USA
1976	Robby Robinson	USA

== Men ==
=== 60 kg ===
Games	Gold	Silver	Bronze
2001 Yangon	Pham Van Mach (VIE)	Aung Naing (MYA)	Tun Tun Aung (MYA)
2005 Shanghai	Cheng Quiang (CHN)	Cho Wangbung (KOR)	Adam Cibula (SVK)
2007 Jeju	Cho Wangbung (KOR)	Anwar el-Amawy (EGY)	Somkhit Sumethovetchakul (THA)
2008 Manama	Anwar el-Amawy (EGY)	Abbas Makki (BHR)	Cho Wang-Bung (KOR)
2009 Doha	Park Kyeong-Mo (KOR)	Anwar el-Amawy (EGY)	Adam Cibula (SVK)

=== 65 kg ===
Games	Gold	Silver	Bronze
1983 Singapore	Hermann Hoffend (FRG)	Antonio Stella (ITA)	Alain Leroy (NCL)
1986 Tokyo	Steve Brisbois (CAN)	John Ruehlman (USA)	José Ballester (ESP)
1987 Madrid	Mohamed Lofty (EGY)	José Ballester (ESP)	Tevlik Ulusoglu (TUR)
1988 Brisbane	Tevlik Ulusoglu (TUR)	José Ballester (ESP)	Flavioa Baccianini (ITA)
1989 Paris	Anwar el-Amawy (EGY)	Mercura Claiborne (USA)	Mohamed Lofty (EGY)
1990 Kuala Lumpur	Anwar el-Amawy (EGY)	Khalil el-Amin (USA)	Mohamed Abdel el-Aziz (EGY)
1991 Katowice	Anwar el-Amawy (EGY)	Mohamed Abdel el-Aziz (EGY)	Sergiy Otroch (URS)
1992 Graz	Pavel Grolmus (TCH)	Bang Woon-Heok (KOR)	Mohamed el-Fasakhani (EGY)
1993 Seoul	Bang Woon-Heok (KOR)	Mohamed Abdel el-Aziz (EGY)	Sergiy Otroch (UKR)
1994 Shanghai	Sergiy Otroch (UKR)	Anwar el-Amawy (EGY)	Jesús Lizíano (ESP)
1995 Agana	Zentri Munir (MAS)	Anwar el-Amawy (EGY)	Mohamed Abdel el-Aziz (EGY)
1996 Amman	Anwar el-Amawy (EGY)	Aldo Fumagalli (ITA)	Mohamed Abdel el-Aziz (EGY)
1997 Praha	José Carlos dos Santos (BRA)	Anwar el-Amawy (EGY)	Jesús Lizíano (ESP)
1998 Izmir	Anwar el-Amawy (EGY)	José Carlos dos Santos (BRA)	
1999 Bratislava	José Carlos dos Santos (BRA)	Anwar el-Amawy (EGY)	Martin Ward (USA)
2000 Melaka	Sazali Samad (MAS)	Pham Van Mach (VIE)	José Carlos dos Santos (BRA)
2001 Yangon	José Carlos dos Santos (BRA)	Anwar el-Amawy (EGY)	In Chai (KOR)
2002 Cairo	José Carlos dos Santos (BRA)	Anwar el-Amawy (EGY)	Pham Van Mach (VIE)
2003 Mumbai	Anwar el-Amawy (EGY)	José Carlos dos Santos (BRA)	Sazali Samad (MAS)
2004 Moscow	Sazali Samad (MAS)	Anwar el-Amawy (EGY)	José Carlos dos Santos (BRA)
2005 Shanghai	José Carlos dos Santos (BRA)	Sazali Samad (MAS)	Anwar el-Amawy (EGY)
2006 Ostrava	Sazali Samad (MAS)	José Carlos dos Santos (BRA)	Anwar el-Amawy (EGY)
2007 Jeju	José Carlos dos Santos (BRA)	Song Jung-In (KOR)	Nguyen van Lam (VIE)
2008 Manama	Sattar al-Jawdah (IRQ)	Song Jung-In (KOR)	Somsri Turinthaisong (THA)
2009 Doha	Amr Mohamed Nasr (EGY)	Prasanna Peiris Ihala Gamage (SRI)	Munguntsetseg (MNG)

=== 70 kg ===
Games	Gold	Silver	Bronze
1979 Columbus	Renato Bertagna (ITA)	Heinz Sallmayer (AUT)	Moh Teck Hin (SIN)
1980 Cairo	Heinz Sallmayer (AUT)	Ken Passariello (USA)	Raymond Beaulieu (CAN)
1981 Cairo	Ken Passariello (USA)	José Rabanal (FRA)	Fikret Hodzic (YUG)
1982 Brugge	James Gaubert (USA)	Jean Leblanc (CAN)	Hermann Hoffend (FRG)
1983 Singapore	Appie Steenbeck (NED)	Mike Piliotis (GBR)	Jesse Lujan (USA)
1984 Las Vegas	Wilfred Sylvester (GBR)	Hermann Hoffend (FRG)	Esmat Sadek (EGY)
1985 Göteborg	Hermann Hoffend (FRG)	Joseph Dawson (USA)	Esmat Sadek (EGY)
1986 Tokyo	Hermann Hoffend (FRG)	Jose Guzman (USA)	Esmat Sadek (EGY)
1987 Madrid	Mohammed Benaziza (ALG)	Juan-Carlos López (ESP)	
1988 Brisbane	Juan Marquez (USA)	Park Young-Chul (KOR)	Han Dong-Ki (KOR)
1989 Paris	Van-Valcot Smith (USA)	Juan-Carlos López (ESP)	
1991 Katowice	Jose Guzman (USA)	Justin Jospitre (FRA)	Han Dong-Ki (KOR)
1992 Graz	André Charette (CAN)	Eduard Derzapf (GER)	Justin Jospitre (FRA)
1993 Seoul	Han Dong-Ki (KOR)	Eduard Derzapf (GER)	Ertugrul Gulcan (TUR)
1994 Shanghai	Justin Jospitre (FRA)	Han Dong-Ki (KOR)	Chris Faildo (USA)
1995 Agana	David Ford (GBR)	Chris Faildo (USA)	Han Dong-Ki (KOR)
1996 Amman	Han Dong-Ki (KOR)	Antonio Blasquez (ESP)	Toshiko Hirota (JPN)
1997 Praha	Steve Holland (USA)	Ahmed Abdel Salam (EGY)	Antonio Blasquez (ESP)
1998 Izmir	Han Dong-Ki (KOR)	Mohsen Yazdani (IRI)	
1999 Bratislava	Yazdani Mohsen (IRI)	Derek Farnsworth (USA)	Han Dong-Ki (KOR)
2000 Melaka	Yossri Sayed (EGY)	Yazdani Mohsen (IRI)	Igor Kocis (SVK)
2001 Yangon	Igor Kocis (SVK)	Yossri Sayed (EGY)	Han Dong-Ki (KOR)
2002 Cairo	Igor Kocis (SVK)	Werner Zenk (GER)	Yassin el-Touchi (EGY)
2003 Mumbai	Igor Kocis (SVK)	Hristomir Hristov (BUL)	Werner Zenk (GER)
2004 Moscow	Hristomir Hristov (BUL)	Corrado Maggiore (ITA)	Oleg Melgunov (RUS)
2005 Shanghai	Igor Kocis (SVK)	Kamil Majek (POL)	Saman Sarabi (IRI)
2006 Ostrava	Corrado Maggiore (ITA)	Richard Riedl (SVK)	Shameen Adams (RSA)
2007 Jeju	Sazali Abdul Samad (MAS)	Patrick Ostolani (GER)	Richard Riedl (SVK)
2008 Manama	Sazali Abdul Samad (MAS)	José Carlos dos Santos (BRA)	Richard Riedl (SVK)
2009 Doha	Mohamed Osman (EGY)	Vyacheslav Makogon (UKR)	Kim Hyung-Chan (KOR)

=== 75 kg ===
Games	Gold	Silver	Bronze
1994 Shanghai	Eduard Derzapf (GER)	Oleg Chur (UKR)	Piero Luigi Tola (ITA)
1995 Agana	Stefan Orosz (CZE)	Piero Luigi Tola (ITA)	Jaroslav Horvath (SVK)
1996 Amman	Ertugrul Gulcan (TUR)	Kim Jun-Ho (KOR)	François Pitarch (FRA)
1997 Praha	Kim Jun-Ho (KOR)	Rene Zimmermann (SUI)	Hakan Gumus (TUR)
1998 Izmir	Ertugrul Gulcan (TUR)		
1999 Bratislava	Tagir Fakhrudinov (AZE)	Peter Gal (HUN)	Kim Myung-Sub (KOR)
2000 Melaka	Dan Pechanex (CZE)	Tagir Fakhrudinov (AZE)	Andreas Becker (GER)
2001 Yangon	Tagir Fakhrudinov (AZE)	Zaw Thein Naing (MYA)	Kim Myung-Sub (KOR)
2002 Cairo	Eduard Derzapf (GER)	Pavlos Mentis (GRE)	Andrej Mozolani (SVK)
2003 Mumbai	Baitollah Abbaspour (IRI)	Alexandr Klier (CZE)	Andrej Mozolani (SVK)
2004 Moscow	Tagir Fakhrutdinov (RUS)	Mikhail Vorobiyev (RUS)	Hynek Neuzil (CZE)
2005 Shanghai	Andrej Mozolani (SVK)	Corrado Maggiore (ITA)	Baitollah Abbaspour (IRI)
2006 Ostrava	Youssry Sayed (EGY)	Kamil Majek (POL)	Igor Losev (RUS)
2007 Jeju	Corrado Maggiore (ITA)	Mahmoud el-Fadaly (RUS)	Soon Boo-Chang (KOR)
2008 Manama	Ismaeel Ali Husain Jasim (BHR)	Igor Kocis (SVK)	Shameen Adams (RSA)
2009 Doha	Ismaeel Ali Husain Jasim (BHR)	Igor Kocis (SVK)	Sheriff el-Shiwy (EGY)

== Totals ==
Rank	Nation	Gold	Silver	Bronze	Total
1	Egypt	12	12	12	36
2	South Korea	7	8	12	27
3	United States	7	8	4	19
4	Brazil	6	4	2	12
5	Malaysia	6	1	1	8
6	Slovakia	5	3	8	16
7	Italy	3	5	2	10
8	West Germany	3	1	1	5
9	Turkey	3	0	3	6
10	Germany	2	4	2	8
11	Iran	2	2	2	6
12	Myanmar	2	2	1	5
13	Canada	2	1	1	4
13	Czech Republic	2	1	1	4
15	Azerbaijan	2	1	0	3
15	Bahrain	2	1	0	3
15	Great Britain	2	1	0	3
18	France	1	2	3	6
19	Russia	1	2	2	5
20	Ukraine	1	2	1	4
21	Austria	1	1	0	2
21	Bulgaria	1	1	0	2
23	Vietnam	1	0	2	3
24	Algeria	1	0	0	1
24	China	1	0	0	1
24	Czechoslovakia	1	0	0	1
24	Iraq	1	0	0	1
24	Netherlands	1	0	0	1
29	Spain	0	5	4	9
30	Poland	0	2	0	2
31	Greece	0	1	0	1
31	Hungary	0	1	0	1
31	Sri Lanka	0	1	0	1
31	Switzerland	0	1	0	1
35	South Africa	0	0	2	2
35	Thailand	0	0	2	2
37	Japan	0	0	1	1
37	Mongolia	0	0	1	1
37	New Caledonia	0	0	1	1
37	Singapore	0	0	1	1
37	Soviet Union	0	0	1	1
37	Yugoslavia	0	0	1	1
Totals (42 entries)		79	74	74	227
