= Afghanistan '11 =

2017 video game

- Developer: Every Other Soldier
- Publisher: Slitherine Software
- Designer: Johan Nagel
- Platforms: Microsoft Windows; Android
- Release: May 23, 2017
- Genre: Turn-based strategy
- Mode: Single-player

Afghanistan '11 is a turn-based strategy computer wargame developed in 2017 by Every Single Soldier, and published by Slitherine Software. Set during the War in Afghanistan, the player controls an American forward operating base who is tasked with capturing a series of villages from the Taliban, while winning the hearts and minds of the local population, and then transferring control of the area to the Afghan National Army.

== Gameplay ==
A US supply truck passing by a Taliban patrol.

In Afghanistan '11, the player controls the US military, who capture an area owned by the Taliban. The game can be played either as part of an 18-level campaign, or a single skirmish. Games last 60 turns, and on the 50th turn, the US military will withdraw from the area, leaving it in control of the Afghan National Army (ANA), who the US will have been training until this point, and now must defend it until the 60th turn. The player wins the game if they retain control of the area and have a Hearts & Minds (H&M) score over 50 when all turns have ended.

The H&M score can be increased by disarming IEDs, providing humanitarian aid, building infrastructure and waterworks, and eliminating the Taliban. It is decreased when civilians are killed, or when the Taliban raid villages and destroy US infrastructure. As the H&M score increases, the local population will become more willing to provide the player with intelligence about the Taliban. In order to deploy new units, the player uses Political Points, representative of domestic support for the war, which are gained when the Taliban are defeated in combat, but decreased when US units are killed. Destroying poppy fields, used by the Taliban to farm opium, also increases Political Points and weakens the Taliban, but at the cost of H&M.

The game also features random events, such as an ANA unit deserting, or an airstrike accidentally hitting a hospital, leading to airstrikes temporarily becoming more expensive.

== Development ==
A spiritual successor to Vietnam '65, the game was designed by former South African soldier Johan Nagel, who had experience dealing with counterinsurgency during his military career.

On September 6 2018, the DLC pack Afghanistan 11: Royal Marines was released, focusing on the British military unit of the same name, adding ten new missions to the game and new vehicles. Additionally, it adds a new gameplay mechanic in the form of civilian vehicles, some of which will contain car bombs.

In 2018, Afghanistan '11 was removed from the iOS App Store as it depicted "a specific government or other real entity as the enemies." The removal was criticised for not making sense, as many other historical video games, such as Twilight Struggle and Civilization VI were allowed to remain on the App Store despite also featuring real combatants as the enemies. Slitherine responded by stating that "Afghanistan '11 is probably the only wargame ever produced where killing the enemy is not the main focus of the game."

== Reception ==
GameWatcher gave the game a score of 7.5/10, noting its graphical improvements compared to Vietnam '65 and the variety in units, but felt the game was held back by bugs, UI which failed to explain things properly, and that some of the gameplay aspects lacked depth.

Rock Paper Shotgun called Afghanistan '11 "quietly brilliant", praising its tone and gameplay, but criticised it for only having one save file per gamemode, not having an undo option, as well as other "minor irritants", such as not being able to give orders to helicopters until they were airborne. Vice said the game was "refreshing for how different it is from many of its peers", but argued it was inferior to Vietnam '65, suggesting that the missions were too long, and too similar to each other.

Quarter to Three gave Afghanistan '11 a perfect score of 5 stars, commending the historically accurate changes in gameplay and strategy from Vietnam '65. Comparatively, while Wargamer also spoke positively of the game, they were critical of the game's approach to counterinsurgency: "The U.S. strategy of “build infrastructure, visit villages until bad guys go away” is modelled as completely workable in Nagel’s games, despite the fact that the two major American wars that have relied heavily on this strategy are anything but resounding successes."
