= ICBM (video game) =

2020 video game

- Developer(s): SoftWarWare and K-Project
- Publisher(s): Slitherine Software
- Platform(s): Windows
- Release: November 17, 2020
- Genre(s): Real-time strategy
- Mode(s): Single-player, multiplayer

ICBM is a real-time strategy game developed by SoftWarWare and K-Project, and published by Slitherine Software in 2020. The game allows players to weigh nuclear warfare by researching technologies, building stockpiles, and launching attacks on opponents while protecting their own population from nuclear attacks.

== Reception ==
Wargamer compared the game to DEFCON (2006) and wrote: "For all of ICBM's good aspects and good ideas, there's just not much depth to it all." PCMag gave the game a rating of four out of five and also compared it to DEFCON. The graphics were described as satisfactory and the user interface as simple and understandable. They would have liked the scenarios to have more variety and the tutorials to be more interesting.

== Sequel ==
ICBM: Escalation is a sequel to ICBM developed by SoftWarWare and published by Slitherine Software on November 21, 2024. On May 27, 2025, an alternate history DLC was released: ICBM: Escalation - Endless October. It features eleven missions from 1950 to 2047.
