= Mohamed Haleem =

- Born: September 14, 1964; Malé, Maldives
- Other names: Kesto
- Occupation: Entrepreneur
- Known for: Founding Muscle load Gymnasium, co-founder BBFM
- Height: 5 ft 11 in (180 cm)
- Spouse: Mariyam Shaira (m. 1983)
- Children: Rizwana Mohamed Haleem (January 18, 1984); Shaddad Mohamed Haleem (October 1, 1991); Shaadhoon Mohamed Haleem (October 8, 1993)
- Website: www.muscleload.com

Mohamed "Kesto" Haleem (Dhivehi: މުޙައްމަދު ހަލީމް; born September 14, 1964), is the founder of Muscle load Gymnasium and the co-founder of BodyBuilding Federation of Maldives (BBFM). He is a Maldivian entrepreneur well known for the introduction of Bodybuilding in Maldives.

== Biography ==
Mohamed Haleem, (September 14, 1964) is the founder of Muscle load Gymnasium.. He opened his personal gymnasium to the public in 1993. In 1997, Mohamed Haleem's father and his friend M W Deen founded the Bodybuilding Federation of Maldives (BBFM) later changed to Bodybuilding Association of Maldives. Kesto, replaced his father as the Vice-Chairman of the BBFM after his death in 2001. Mohamed Haleem is a founder member of:

- Bodybuilding Federation of Maldives
- Commonwealth Bodybuilding federation
- South Asian Bodybuilding and fitness Federation
- World Bodybuilding and Physique Sports Federation.

And Also a member of Asian Body Building Federation.

=== Early life ===
Haleem began his education at Montessori School, Malé. He then joined Majeediyya School to complete his secondary education. Haleem worked as a Deputy Immigration Officer of Maldives for 13 years.

== Awards ==
- Certificate of Merit (IFBB) for promoting Bodybuilding and Fitness among Maldivians
- Bronze Medal (IFBB) for promoting Bodybuilding and Fitness among Maldivians from Ben Weider
- Silver Medal (IFBB) for promoting Bodybuilding and Fitness among Maldivians
- Silver Medal (IFBB) for promoting Bodybuilding and Fitness among South Asian region from Paul Chua
- ABBF 50th Anniversary Diamond pin
