= Commander: Europe at War =

2007 video game

- Original Windows cover art
- Developer(s): Slitherine Software; Firepower Entertainment; Freeverse (Mac); Impressionware (DS, PSP)
- Publisher(s): Matrix Games
- Designer(s): Johan Persson
- Composer(s): Michael Rubino
- Platform(s): Windows, Mac OS X, Nintendo DS, PlayStation Portable
- Release: June 2007 (Win); December 2007 (OS X); March 20, 2009 (DS, PSP)
- Genre(s): Turn-based strategy
- Mode(s): Single-player, multiplayer

Commander: Europe at War (CEaW) is a World War II turn-based strategy computer game. The game was codeveloped by Slitherine Software and Firepower Entertainment, and allows gamers to play either the Axis or the Allies. Commander features six scenarios, 50 inventions from five technology branches, and 12 different unit classes. A sequel, Commander: Napoleon at War, was released in 2008. Another sequel, Commander: The Great War, was released in 2012.

== Release ==
The game was announced on May 28, 2006. A Mac OS X port was released in December 2007 by Freeverse. Nintendo DS and PlayStation Portable ports were released in 2009. They were ported by Italian developer Impressionware.

== Reception ==
Reception

Aggregate score
Aggregator	Score
GameRankings	82%

Review scores
Publication	Score
Eurogamer	7/10 (DS)
PALGN	8/10
Pelit	85/100

Larry Levandowski of Armchair General said: "As a complete package, Commander – Europe at War, is a crowd pleaser. Strategy players at all levels of experience will enjoy this accessible game. Grognards looking for depth and historical accuracy may want to look elsewhere. But even grizzled veterans of the genre might fall for the game’s charms."

Neil Booth of PAL Gaming Network said that it's "[a]n excellent game for both hardcore strategy nuts and newcomers alike. An unassuming surface hides hours of ferociously addictive gameplay that's rivalled by few other titles."

Tuukka Grönholm of Pelit summarized: "Commander: Europe at War is a deep and fun strategy game that shines in multiplayer. The only problem is that Commander feels very much like Strategic Command, but it is not quite as good."
