= Battlestar Galactica Deadlock =

2017 video game

- Steam store art
- Developer: Black Lab Games
- Publisher: Slitherine Software
- Series: Battlestar Galactica
- Engine: Unity
- Platforms: Windows, PlayStation 4, Xbox One, Nintendo Switch
- Release: 31 August 2017 (Windows); 8 December 2017 (PS4, Xbox One); 8 October 2019 (Switch)
- Genre: Turn-based strategy
- Modes: Single-player, multiplayer

Battlestar Galactica Deadlock is a turn-based strategy video game developed by Black Lab Games and published by Slitherine Software for Windows on 31 August 2017. It is based on the science fiction franchise Battlestar Galactica.

== Gameplay ==
Battlestar Galactica Deadlock is a 3D turn-based strategy game. It uses a simultaneous turn structure (WEGO) where opponents confirm commands and are then executed at the same time. Deadlock is based in the first Cylon war. There is player versus player multiplayer or two player co-op against the artificial intelligence (AI).

== Development ==
Battlestar Galactica Deadlock was developed by Black Lab Games, a studio based in Perth, Australia. Following the release of their previous game, Star Hammer: The Vanguard Prophecy, publisher Slitherine asked them if they had any intellectual properties (IPs) they were interested in working on, and director Paul Turbett listed multiple IPs, including Battlestar Galactica, leading to them being allowed to work with this IP. Before the story or gameplay were designed, Turbett created "guiding principles" for how to make an authentic Battlestar Galactica experience, The core team was five people, with additional contributors helping out, such as the soundtrack's composer, Ash Gibson Greig. The voice acting was done by Slitherine, which sourced and recorded the voice talent in Los Angeles.

== Release ==
Battlestar Galactica Deadlock was announced on 16 May 2017, for PC, PlayStation 4, and Xbox One. The release date was set for summer 2017. On 31 August 2017, the PC version was released. On the same day, the console versions were delayed to late 2017. The PlayStation 4 and Xbox One versions were released on 8 December 2017. A Nintendo Switch version was announced on 25 September 2019, and released on 8 October 2019. Several downloadable content (DLC) packs have been released.

In November 2025, developer Black Lab Games and publisher Slitherine Games announced that the game and its DLCs would be delisted from stores later that same month. No reason was given for the delistings.

== Reception ==
Reception

Aggregate score
Aggregator	Score
Metacritic	77/100 (PC); 76/100 (PS4)

Review scores
Publication	Score
IGN	7.8/10 (US); 7.7/10 (Italy)
PC Games (DE)	72%
Digitally Downloaded	4.5/5
PC Invasion	7/10

Battlestar Galactica Deadlock received "generally favorable" reviews according to review aggregator Metacritic.

Caley Roark of IGN summarized: "Battlestar Galactica: Deadlock pleasantly checks a lot of boxes: Sci-fi tactics and strategy; good controls; proper Battlestar Galactica game with attention to detail. That it does so with enjoyable and challenging gameplay makes it easy to overlook the less-than-stellar graphics and interface issues in the strategy layer. So say we all."

Matt Purslow of PCGamesN summarized: "The tutorial is finicky and some of the mechanical presentation misses the mark, but its a novelty to play a tie-in game that's not a dreadful mobile game. Deadlock may be small, but it really does capture the feeling of being on the back foot, which is what Battlestar Galactica is all about."

Peter Parrish of PC Invasion summarized: "Compelling tactical fleet combat and a middling strategic campaign layer combine with some carefully applied Galactica aesthetics. That extra attention to detail earns Deadlock a little more than a hard six."

Matt S. of Digitally Downloaded summarized: "Battlestar Galactica: Deadlock serves a particular niche; it's for people who are both strategy game fans and Battlestar Galactica fans. I don't know how many of us are out there, but I hope there's enough that the entire development team gets rewarded for the excellent work that they've done. Yes it's a budget game and a really authentic Battlestar Galactic experience really should also have solo flight and ground missions, but as a complement to the overall franchise, I couldn't ask for more. This game is brilliant."

== See also ==
- Star Hammer: The Vanguard Prophecy, the previous strategy game by the same developer and publisher
- Warhammer 40,000: Battlesector, the next strategy game by the same developer and publisher
