= Wilfred P. Deac =

Wilfred P. Deac is a former civilian government official who was attached to the US Embassy in Cambodia in 1971. He was also stationed in Europe and the United States during his career. He is the author of Road to the Killing Fields, published by the Texas A&M University Press in 2000. He has made many contributions to Vietnam Magazine, Military History Magazine, and other historical publications. He currently works as a freelance writer.
