= Sarabi (disambiguation) =

Sarabi is a fictional lioness and the mother of Simba in The Lion King.

Sarabi may also refer to:

- Sarabi dog, a breed of livestock guardian dog
- Abdul Wahed Sarābi (born 1926), Afghan government minister
- Habiba Sarābi (born 1956), Afghan hematologist and politician
- Mohammad Feyz Sarabi (1928–2022), Iranian Shiite cleric and politician
- Saman Sarabi (born 1976), Iranian bodybuilder
