= Warhammer 40,000: Gladius – Relics of War =

2018 video game

- Steam header
- Developer: Proxy Studios
- Publisher: Slitherine Software
- Series: Warhammer 40,000
- Platforms: Windows, Linux
- Release: July 12, 2018
- Genres: Turn-based strategy, 4X
- Modes: Single-player, multiplayer

Warhammer 40,000: Gladius – Relics of War is a turn-based strategy 4X video game developed by Proxy Studios and published by Slitherine Software for Windows and Linux on July 12, 2018. It is based on Games Workshop's tabletop wargame Warhammer 40,000.

== Gameplay ==
Gladius – Relics of War is a turn-based strategy 4X game played on a hex grid, set on an imperial world of Gladius in the Warhammer 40,000 universe. There are initially four races to choose from: Imperial Guard, Space Marines, Orks, or Necrons. Additional races are unlocked via DLC. There is no diplomacy, a departure from a typical 4X game. The multiplayer supports hotseat mode.

== Release ==
Gladius – Relics of War was announced on November 27, 2017. Several downloadable content (DLC) packs have been released for the game.

== Reception ==
Reception

Aggregate score
Aggregator	Score
Metacritic	71/100

Review scores
Publication	Score
4Players	75/100
GameStar	71/100
IGN	7.9/10 (US); 8.7/10 (Italy)
Jeuxvideo.com	14/20
The Games Machine (Italy)	8.4/10
Digitally Downloaded	3.5/5
Multiplayer.it	8.3/10
Strategy Gamer	4/5

Gladius – Relics of War received "mixed or average" reviews according to review aggregator Metacritic.

Leana Hafer of IGN called Gladius "a really well-done, turn-based 40K wargame."

Tom Senior of PC Gamer summarized that the game is "[a] plodding and predictable 4X strategy game that's relaxing in its own way, but rarely challenging."

Davide Pessach of Eurogamer gave seven out of ten to the Tyranids expansion.

== See also ==
- Pandora: First Contact, the previous 4X game by the same developer and publisher
