= Distant Worlds =

Distant Worlds may refer to:

- "Distant Worlds", a song from the video game Final Fantasy XI
- Distant Worlds: Music from Final Fantasy, a series of concerts featuring music from the Final Fantasy video game series
- Distant Worlds (video game), a 2010 video game
