= Empires Apart =

2018 video game

- Developer: DESTINYbit
- Publisher: Slitherine
- Engine: Unreal Engine 4
- Platform: Windows
- Release: WW: March 29, 2018
- Genre: Real-time strategy
- Modes: Single-player, multiplayer

Empires Apart is a real-time strategy game developed by Italian studio DESTINYbit and published by Slitherine. Empires Apart was released March 29, 2018.

== Gameplay ==
Empires Apart allows the player to control any of seven medieval civilizations, namely Byzantines (available for free), Arabs, Aztecs, Chinese, French, Koreans, and Mongols (each as individual DLC). the player Resources are collected by the villagers and there are 4 resources to collect Wood (mainly used to build structures and archers), Food (mainly use for building villagers units and upgrades), Stone (used for advanced structures and defensive buildings such as forts), Gold (used for some military units and upgrades) The combat system in Empires Apart has a strong paper scissors stone element with spearmen beating cavalry, archers beating spearmen and cavalry beating archers. There are many other units that vary the mechanics. There are also Hero units unique to each faction with special abilities, priests with a range of abilities and the ability to collect Relics. There are 5 ancient powerful artifacts scattered around the map at the start. Players use priests to collect relics. Each relic gives combat bonuses to the side that controls it.

== Release ==
Empires Apart was announced on July 5, 2016, for a late 2016 release. The game became free-to-play on October 16, 2018.

== Reception ==
Reception

Aggregate score
Aggregator	Score
Metacritic	68/100

Review scores
Publication	Score
GameStar	67/100
IGN	8/10
PC PowerPlay	7/10
The Games Machine (Italy)	7.7/10
Meristation	7/10
Multiplayer.it	7.8/10
PC Invasion	5/10
Strategy Gamer	4/5

On review aggregator Metacritic, the game has an aggregated score of 68 based on 14 reviews, indicating "mixed or average reviews".

Dimitry Halley of GameStar said the game is a "[s]olid clone of Age of Empires with technical mishaps, which barely offers single-player content, but varied factions and strategies in PvP."

Daniele Dolce of The Games Machine said that "[d]espite some technical issues and a skimpy single player, Empires Apart is an enjoyable and well balanced old-style RTS. If you are in search of a competitive multiplayer game, look no further."

Marcello Perricone of Strategy Gamer summarized: "In the end, Empires Apart is both a good spiritual successor to Microsoft’s classic and a good game in its own right, delivering a very capable experience that successfully brings most of Age of Empires mechanics into the modern age. If you liked Ensemble’s iconic series then you should definitely take a look at this game."
