= The Wargamer =

The Wargamer may refer to

- The 1977–1990 print magazine published in the United Kingdom, or
- The wargamer.com web site, founded in 1995.
