= Warhammer 40,000: Sanctus Reach =

2017 video game

- GOG.com store art
- Developer: Straylight Entertainment
- Publisher: Slitherine Software
- Series: Warhammer 40,000
- Platform: Windows
- Release: January 19, 2017
- Genre: Turn-based strategy
- Modes: Single-player, multiplayer

Warhammer 40,000: Sanctus Reach is a turn-based strategy video game developed by Straylight Entertainment and published by Slitherine Software for Windows on January 19, 2017. It is based on Games Workshop's tabletop wargame Warhammer 40,000, specifically The Red Waaagh! campaign.

== Gameplay ==
Warhammer 40,000: Sanctus Reach is a turn-based strategic game. Two factions are playable: Orks or Space Marines of the Space Wolves Chapter. The multiplayer has a play-by-mail mode.

== Release ==
Warhammer 40,000: Sanctus Reach was developed by Slitherine's in-house team Straylight Entertainment, based in Scotland. The game was announced on August 2, 2016, to be released before the end of 2016. On November 29, 2016, the release was delayed to January 19, 2017. Three downloadable content (DLC) packs were released: Legacy of the Weirdboy, Sons of Cadia, and Horrors of the Warp.

== Reception ==
Reception

Aggregate score
Aggregator	Score
Metacritic	69/100

Review scores
Publication	Score
GameSpot	4/10
Gry-Online	7.0/10
Multiplayer.it	8.0/10
Strategy Gamer	4/5

Warhammer 40,000: Sanctus Reach received "mixed or average" reviews according to review aggregator Metacritic.

Daniel Starkey of GameSpot called the game "[...] mediocre at best and vexing at worst."

Fraser Brown of Rock Paper Shotgun said that "Sanctus Reach’s unit and faction design and flexible mechanics deserve a much better campaign and fewer constantly recycled objectives."

Joe Robinson of Strategy Gamer summarized the game as "[a] solid & satisfyingly tactical turn-based strategy game set in the grim darkness of the far future. A few teething issues, but nothing to really worry about." Robinson also reviewed the second DLC pack, Sons of Cadia, saying: "Sons of Cadia can feel a bit more of a slog than the other campaigns at times, but the devs creativity and reverence does still shine In moments of glory." Alex Connolly reviewed the third DLC pack, Horrors of the Warp, for Strategy Gamer and said that "[i]f Straylight are able to loosen up the persnickety interface and inject as much pizzazz into map and mission design as they have with the unit models, expansions like Horrors of the Warp would soar. As it stands right now, the expansion is merely ‘good’, and the only modifier would be how much Chaos floats your boat."

In a retrospective, Jody Macgregor of PC Gamer said the game is "[...] not bad, but it is basic" and "everything on the presentation side, from unit types to animation to level furniture, feels like the absolute minimum, where 40K should be all about maximalism."
