= Battle of the Bulge (video game) =

2012 video game

- Developer: Shenandoah Studio
- Publishers: Shenandoah Studio; Slitherine Software (PC)
- Platforms: iOS, Android, macOS, Windows
- Release: December 13, 2012 (iOS, Android); September 17, 2015 (PC)
- Genre: Computer wargame
- Mode: Single-player

Battle of the Bulge is an iOS historical wargame developed by American studio Shenandoah Studio and released on December 13, 2012. A PC version was published by Slitherine Software in 2015.

== Critical reception ==
The game has a Metacritic rating of 85% based on 13 critic reviews. The PC version received a positive review from 4Players.
