= Bodybuilding at the 2006 Asian Games – Men's 70 kg =

Men's 70 kg at the 2006 Asian Games
- Venue: Al-Dana Banquet Hall
- Date: 8 December 2006
- Competitors: 15 from 13 nations

Medalists
gold medal	Simon Chua	Singapore
silver medal	Syafrizaldy	Indonesia
bronze medal	Kenji Kondo	Japan

The men's 70 kilograms event at the 2006 Asian Games was held on December 8, 2006 at the Al-Dana Banquet Hall in Doha, Qatar.

== Schedule ==
All times are Arabia Standard Time (UTC+03:00)

Date	Time	Event
Friday, 8 December 2006	11:30	Prejudging round
Friday, 8 December 2006	17:20	Final round

== Results ==
=== Prejudging round ===
Rank	Athlete	Score
1	Simon Chua (SIN)	5
2	Sayed Faisal Husain (BRN)	~~16~~
3	Syafrizaldy (INA)	19
4	Saman Sarabi (IRI)	22
5	Kenji Kondo (JPN)	23
6	Cao Quốc Phú (VIE)	29
7	Kim Hyun-chan (KOR)	32
8	Jalal Al-Rayashi (QAT)	36
9	Omar Hanzal (IRQ)	41
10	Masahiro Sue (JPN)	51
11	Zhang Guangyou (CHN)	55
12	Pan Jinghui (CHN)	58
13	Haitham Al-Zadjali (OMA)	61
14	Iao Chong Wa (MAC)	70
15	Ibrahim Sira Waheed (MDV)	75

=== Final round ===
Rank	Athlete	Prej.	Final	Total
1st place, gold medalist(s)	Simon Chua (SIN)	5	5	10
2nd place, silver medalist(s)	Syafrizaldy (INA)	19	15	34
3rd place, bronze medalist(s)	Kenji Kondo (JPN)	23	21	44
4	Saman Sarabi (IRI)	22	23	45
DQ	Sayed Faisal Husain (BRN)	16	11	~~27~~

- Sayed Faisal Husain of Bahrain originally won the silver medal, but was disqualified after he failed the drug test.
