= Broken Arrow (video game) =

Real Time Strategy Video Game

- Developer: Steel Balalaika Studio
- Publisher: Slitherine Software
- Director: Félix Habert
- Producer: Nikita Hiletin
- Composers: Evgeny Shchukin; Aleksander Tochilkin
- Engine: Unity
- Platform: Windows
- Release: 19 June 2025
- Genres: Real Time, Strategic, Tactical
- Modes: Single-Player & Multiplayer

Broken Arrow is a large-scale real-time modern warfare tactics game developed by Steel Balalaika and published by Slitherine. The game features American and Russian factions with a unique army building system and deep units customisation tool. The game was initially announced in 2019, during a crowdfunding campaign on the Russian crowdfunding platform Boomstarter.

Broken Arrow was released for Windows on 19 June 2025 on Steam and VK Play. Support for Linux via Proton was added in later updates. The game received mixed to positive reviews; critics praised detailed unit customisation and tactical complexity, and criticised technical issues such as a lack of mid-mission saves in the singleplayer mode, as well as the large presence of cheaters in multiplayer.

== Gameplay ==
Players are initially given default decks (Armies/Battlegroups) to use. Each faction is uniquely resourced to a certain specialization. Each faction has upwards of 200+ different units.

An essential part of gameplay is resource management. During gameplay, points can be earned by eliminating enemy units, recycling existing units (sending units back to base) and by staying in the game over time. Each unit is assigned a point/monetary value, which the player can spend and recycle. As players begin to understand the mechanics of the game, they are able to directly customize and manipulate actions of individual units. When customizing/upgrading, units become more expensive and resource dependent.

=== Factions ===
Russia - Russian units are based on Airborne Forces (VDV), Motostrelki (Mechanized Infantry), Morskaya Pekhota (Naval Infantry), Spetsnaz and other Russian military units.

United States - U.S. units are based on United States Marine Corps Marine air–ground task force, U.S. Army's Armored, Airborne and Stryker Brigade Combat Teams and US Special Operations Forces.

=== Army Building ===
Players build/customize an army that fits their playing style. They can do this in a few ways: customizing/modifying individual units and/or by customizing their army around a specialization (airborne, armor, marines, etc).

==== Unit Types ====
- Infantry - Infantry can garrison buildings to gain stealth and protection.
- Reconnaissance - Specialized in the task of spotting and marking the enemy position.
- Vehicles - Armoured vehicles (tanks & IFVs), ATGM carriers and fire support vehicles.
- Support - Artillery and anti-aircraft vehicles that provide long-range support and logistics vehicles carrying ammunition, medical supplies that can repair units.
- Helicopters - Includes attack helicopters for hit and run tactics using a large variety of rockets, guns and missiles. They can also transport infantry and lift vehicles and supplies across the battlefield.
- Airplanes (Air Support)- Used to intercept enemy aircraft or support your troops on the ground with bombs, rockets and cruise missiles. Cargo planes can also airdrop infantry, vehicles and supplies.

== Development ==
Developer Steel Balalaika is based in Russia. A multiplayer beta was released in early 2024 to over 250,000 users. Steel Balalaika Studios is also developing a new type of scenario editor that allows users to create scenarios with cutscenes and dialogue without the need to write code.

The game's sound designer and Steel Balalaika co-founder Aleksander Tochilkin described using a combination of synthesizers, commercially available sound libraries, and original recordings to create the game's audio effects. Individual vehicles were given distinct engine sounds, while weapon and explosion effects were layered and processed to remain recognizable from the game's overhead perspective.

== Release ==
The initial release date was in 2024, but Steel Balalaika Studios pushed back the date to June 19, 2025. In the months before the release, the studio announced an advanced copy release named the Vanguard Edition, which contained the soundtrack, digital wallpapers, and exclusive skins for a range of different units, with early access on Monday June 16.
