= Stargate: Timekeepers =

- Developer: Slitherine Poland
- Publisher: Slitherine Software
- Series: Stargate
- Engine: Unity
- Platform: Windows
- Release: WW: January 23, 2024
- Genres: Real-time tactics, stealth
- Mode: Single-player

Stargate: Timekeepers is a real-time tactics video game developed by Slitherine Poland and published by Slitherine Software. Players attempt to stealthily complete missions with a team of soldiers set in alien worlds from the Stargate franchise.

== Gameplay ==
Players control a group of soldiers in an original story connected to season 7 of Stargate SG-1. Stargate: Timekeepers is a real-time tactics game in which players must complete missions using stealth. The team consists of Colonel Eva McCain, a soldier and the team leader; Max Bolton, a sniper; the scientist Derrick Harper; Sam Watson, a spy who can infiltrate enemy base by impersonating Jaffa; and A'ta, a Jaffa defector who assists the team. Enemies who discover the team or evidence they have been at the base call reinforcements. Stargate: Timekeepers is divided into seasons. The first season includes 14 chapters. Seven chapters are included in the initial release, and the remaining seven were released later in 2024.

== Development ==
CreativeForge Games, a Polish video game studio, collaborated with Slitherine Software to form a new studio, Slitherine Poland. They took over development from CreativeForge, though it comprised mostly the same team members. Slitherine Software released it for Windows on January 23, 2024.

== Reception ==
Stargate: Timekeepers received positive reviews on Metacritic. IGN called it "challenging and enjoyable" and likened it to Shadow Tactics: Blades of the Shogun. They said they had to read Stargate SG-1 plot synopses to remind them of the franchise's complex mythology, and they found some of the characters to lack depth, but they enjoyed the combination of stealth, tactics, and Stargate. The Games Machine compared it to the Commandos series and praised the mission design, though they said some people may dislike the episodic nature and delayed release of the second half of the first season. Multiplayer.it said it was not as good as Shadow Gambit: The Cursed Crew, but they recommended it to fans of SG-1 and Commandos.
