= Pandora: First Contact =

2013 video game

- Developer(s): Proxy Studios
- Publisher(s): Slitherine Software
- Platform(s): Microsoft Windows, macOS, Linux
- Release: NA: 15 November 2013
- Genre(s): 4X
- Mode(s): Single-player, multiplayer

Pandora: First Contact is a 2013 4X game developed by German company Proxy Studios and published by Slitherine Software. It is inspired by Sid Meier's Alpha Centauri and is about ideologically opposed factions from Earth who colonize a hostile planet.

== Gameplay ==
After polluting Earth, colonists settle a new planet. The native lifeforms are not initially hostile, but as the human colonists destroy their habitats by polluting the world, the lifeforms grow increasingly restless. The human factions are split among ideological boundaries and receive different bonuses. Although the technology tree is partially randomised, there are still prerequisites that must be researched.

== Development ==
The game was written by game journalist Dan Griliopoulos, who was inspired by Sid Meier's Alpha Centauri. Slitherine Software released the game on 15 November 2013.

An expansion pack, Eclipse of Nashira, was announced on July 29, 2014, and released on September 19, 2014.

== Reception ==
Pandora: First Contact received mixed reviews on Metacritic. In his review for GameSpot, Daniel Starkey wrote that the game "is laden with awful design choices and a confusing mishmash of old and new mechanics". Unlike the Civilization series, Starkey said Pandora effectively forced players to play in a single way to win the game. Rock Paper Shotgun's critic Adam Smith wrote, "It's a solid example of the form but too simple in execution to live up to the more ambitious and unusual aspects of its design." Although he recommended the game to 4X enthusiasts, Rob P. of Digitally Downloaded cautioned fans of Firaxis' games that the game has a stronger focus on war than its inspirations.

== See also ==
- Warhammer 40,000: Gladius – Relics of War, the next 4X game by the same developer and publisher
