= Civil War Times =

History magazine about the American Civil War

- Frequency: Quarterly
- Founder: Robert Fowler
- First issue: 1962
- Company: World History Group
- Country: USA
- Based in: Leesburg, Virginia
- Website: www.historynet.com/magazines/civil_war_times
- ISSN: 0009-8094

Civil War Times (formerly Civil War Times Illustrated) was a history magazine that covered the American Civil War. It was established in 1962 by Robert Fowler due to centennial anniversary interest in the Civil War in the United States. The magazine was originally named Civil War Times Illustrated Magazine and based in Gettysburg, Pennsylvania. It focused on both battlefield strategy and tactics and the social and economic conditions of the time, as well as the aftermath of the Civil War on the present.

== Structure ==
Civil War Times had a number of recurring departments, including:

- Turning Points: Pivotal transitions in the course of the war.
- Irregulars: Descriptions of the role of irregular branches on the war effort (engineers, recruiters, etc.)
- Civil War Today: Current news from the Civil War community
- Gallery: Profile and picture of a reader's Civil War ancestor
- In Their Footsteps: Battlefield tour guides and points of interest
- My War: First-hand soldier diaries, letters and memoirs

== History ==
=== Establishment ===
Fowler first introduced the publication at a Civil War re-enactment being staged near the battlefield at Gettysburg, Pennsylvania, and he has been a driving force for the publication.

=== 2006 acquisition ===
In 2006, the Weider History Group, a wholly owned subsidiary of Weider Health and Fitness Inc, acquired Civil War Times in an acquisition of eleven history-related magazines from another magazine chain, along with America's Civil War, Armchair General, Vietnam, etc. These acquisitions caused controversies over a change in editorial direction, including the resignation of the Civil War Times's editor (Chris Lewis), and general criticisms of anti-Palestine bias. In 2015 Civil War Times, along with its sister publication America's Civil War, was acquired by the World History Group. In the summer of 2022 World History Group announced both titles would scale back to a quarterly publishing schedule.

=== Scaling back and shut down ===
In 2023 the magazine ceased printing and became available online only. Upon the release of the Spring 2024 issue, World History Group's corporate owner shut down operations entirely.

== See also ==
- William C. Davis (historian)
