= Headquarters: World War II =

2024 video game

- Developer: Starni Games
- Publisher: Slitherine Software
- Engine: Unreal Engine 4
- Platform: Windows
- Release: WW: April 11, 2024
- Genres: Turn-based strategy, turn-based tactics
- Modes: Single-player, multiplayer

Headquarters: World War II is a turn-based strategy video game developed by Starni Games and published by Slitherine Software. Players control one of the forces during the Battle of Normandy and fight tactical battles.

== Gameplay ==
Players control either the US, UK, or Germany during the Battle of Normandy. Players fight turn-based and tactical battles in either a multiplayer skirmish mode or a single-player campaign. There is a campaign for each faction, and each campaign has nine levels. Headquarters: World War II uses realistic graphics and depicts the destruction of villages where battles occur. A level editor is included.

== Development ==
Developer Starni Studios is based in Kyiv, Ukraine. Slitherine Software released it for Windows on April 11, 2024.

== Reception ==
Headquarters: World War II received generally favorable reviews from critics, according to the review aggregation website Metacritic. Digitally Downloaded said it is accessible and lives up to its fast-paced description, though the pacing comes at the price of background detail. They felt that although Headquarters: World War II is a good introduction to Slitherine Software's catalog of computer wargames, they would have preferred more background detail to dispel myths about the war. Multiplayer.it compared it to the modern XCOM games but said it is more targeted toward fans of computer wargames. The Games Machine recommended it to fans of XCOM who are looking a World War II theme.
