= Saman Sarabi =

Iranian IFBB professional bodybuilder (born 1976)

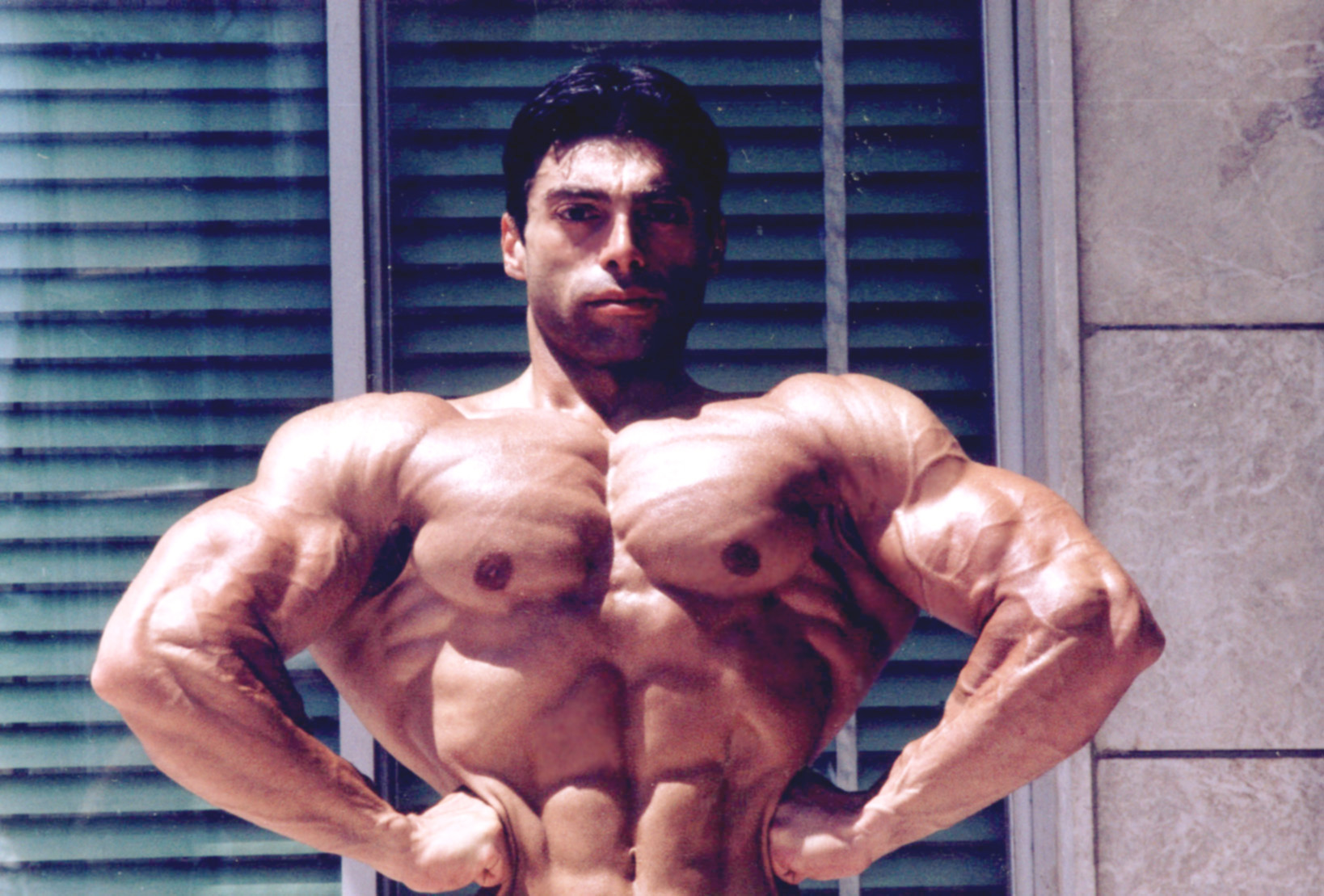

Personal information
- Native name: سامان سرابی
- Full name: Saman Sarabi
- Nationality: Iranian
- Born: November 17, 1976 (age 49) Tehran, Iran
Medal record
Men's Bodybuilding
Representing Iran
World Championships
Bronze medal – third place	2005 China Shanghai	70 kg
Asian Championships
Gold medal – first place	2001 South Korea Pusan	70 kg
Gold medal – first place	2003 Kazakhstan Almaty	70 kg

Saman Sarabi (Persian: سامان سرابی, born November 17, 1976 in Tehran) is an Iranian IFBB professional bodybuilder. His father is Sohrab Sarabi an Iranian athlete in the field of bodybuilding. In 70 kg weight he was a List of World Amateur Bodybuilding Championships medalists.

Authorities:

st Asian Champion 2001 South Korea Pusan.

First Asian Champion 2003 Kazakhstan Almaty.

Third World Champion 2005 China Shanghai.

Fourth Bodybuilding at the 2006 Asian Games – Men's 70 kg.
