= Drive on Moscow =

2013 video game

- Developer: Shenandoah Studio
- Publishers: Shenandoah Studio; Slitherine Software (PC)
- Platforms: iOS, Windows
- Release: November 21, 2013 (iOS); October 27, 2016 (PC)
- Genre: Strategy

Drive on Moscow is a strategy game developed by Shenandoah Studio, an American company, and it was released on iOS on November 21, 2013. The game's focus is on military strategy, specifically the Eastern Front of World War II, and it allows players to engage in strategic battles set in and around Moscow. A Windows port of the game was later published by Slitherine Software in 2016.

== Reception ==
Reception

Aggregate score
Aggregator	Score
Metacritic	iOS: 90/100

Review scores
Publication	Score
4Players	9/10
Gamezebo	5/5
Pocket Gamer	4/5
148Apps	4.5/5

Drive on Moscow's iOS release received "universal acclaim" on review aggregator Metacritic, based on four reviews.

Gamezebo said "Drive on Moscow is a triumph, a game as sweeping as the campaign it seeks to simulate. Shenandoah continue to single-handedly redefine the strategy genre on iOS, and you should get on board: the entry price looks steep but it's worth every penny." 148apps wrote "Wargames have a notorious learning curve. Drive On Moscow tries to flatten that curve." 4Players.de said "Beautiful design, clever mechanics that challenge the tactician. If you like war games, then you shouldn't miss out on this gem." Pocket Gamer UK said "Another slice of exacting, unadorned tactical play from Shenandoah, Drive on Moscow doesn't tinker much with Battle of the Bulge's mechanics, but its new setting makes for an equally worthwhile challenge."

Rock Paper Shotgun called the PC version "[...] one of 2016’s most absorbing and affordable battle sims".
