= Vietnam Magazine =

American magazine

Vietnam
- Editor: Chuck Springston
- Frequency: Bimonthly
- Founder: Harry G. Summers, Jr.
- First issue: 1988
- Company: Weider History Group
- Country: United States
- Based in: Vienna, Virginia
- Language: English
- ISSN: 1046-2902

Vietnam Magazine was an American full-color history magazine published bi-monthly which covers the Vietnam War. It was founded in 1988 by the late Colonel Harry G. Summers, Jr. Colonel Summers served in the U.S. Army in both Korea and Vietnam, where he was twice wounded and decorated for valor.

Until 2024, the editor was David T. Zabecki, he served as major general, until his retirement in 2007, in the U.S. Army Reserve and as Deputy Chief of Staff for Mobilization and Reserve Affairs for U.S. Army Europe. It ceased publication in March 2024.

== Contributors ==
Contributors to Vietnam include journalists, military historians, political analysts and the commanders and men who served. Many articles were first-person accounts of combat operations, including personal interviews with enlisted men and officers, and specs on units and weaponry.

Some notable contributors to Vietnam include:

- Major General Huỳnh Văn Cao, commander of the Army of the Republic of Vietnam 7th Division
- Colonel David H. Hackworth, Vietnam veteran and prominent military journalist
- General Nguyen Duc Huy, commander of the NVA 351st Division
- Senator John McCain, retired U.S. Navy aviator and senator from Arizona
- Oliver Stone, Vietnam veteran and director of Platoon and Born on the Fourth of July
- General William Westmoreland, Commander U.S. Military Assistance Command, Vietnam

== Publication format ==
Vietnam Magazine was a sister publication to Military History magazine. It was published in Leesburg, Virginia, by the Weider History Group, along with the publications America's Civil War and Civil War Times.

Vietnam had a number of recurring departments, including:

- Personality – Study of an individual person in the Vietnam War
- Arsenal – Profiles on the armament, artillery, armor and supplies used in the war
- Fighting Forces – Study of an individual unit in the war
- Perspectives – First-hand accounts of experiences in the Vietnam War
