= Distant Worlds (video game) =

2010 video game

- Developer(s): Code Force
- Publisher(s): Matrix Games
- Platform(s): Windows
- Release: March 25, 2010
- Genre(s): 4X
- Mode(s): Single player

Distant Worlds is a real-time grand strategy wargame developed by Code Force and published by Matrix Games.

Distant Worlds was released on March 25, 2010. Three subsequent expansions, Return of the Shakturi, Legends, and Shadows were released in 2010, 2011, and 2013, respectively. The game appeared on the Steam platform on May 23, 2014, under the name Distant Worlds: Universe, gathering the original game and all expansions into a single package with new content. It was followed by Distant Worlds 2, released in 2022.

== Gameplay ==
Gameplay features up to 1,400 star systems, with up to 50,000 planets, moons and asteroids in a single game session.

Key differences from other games of the genre are the vast scale, along with task automation systems that help the player manage their empire.

== Reception ==
Distant Worlds received generally positive reviews upon its release. RTSguru gave it 8 out of 10, praising the replayability and large galaxies, while diverting some criticism towards the user interface and graphics. Gamesquad awarded it an 8.0 out of 10, praising the automation options and the economical system of the game. However, they expressed some concern towards the game's tutorial, stating that "while the game does help the new player with its efficient UI and two tutorials, the player still feels like the game stuffs him in a spacesuit, gives him a pat on the back and kicks him out the airlock to fend for himself." Metacritic recorded a weighted average score of 81/100 for Distant Worlds: Universe.

Space Sector initially had mixed feelings towards the game, giving it 5.0 out of 10. While praising the vastness of the game, they ultimately felt that the interface, steep learning curve, lackluster graphics and some bad design implementations had made Distant Worlds "a dry, sterile, overwhelming, boring and ultimately not fun game to play." The reviewer, Adam Solo, later modified his article to an 8.8 out of 10, stating the game had vastly improved after several patches and its first expansion were released.

Rock Paper Shotgun gave the Distant Worlds: Universe collection its Best Strategy Game of 2014 award.
