= Zé Carlos (footballer, born 1954) =

Brazilian footballer

Personal information
- Full name: José Carlos dos Santos
- Date of birth: 17 March 1954 (age 72)
- Place of birth: Recife, Brazil
- Height: 1.72 m (5 ft 8 in)
- Position: Forward

International career
Years	Team	Apps	(Gls)
- Brazil Olympic

José Carlos dos Santos (born 17 March 1954), known as Zé Carlos, is a Brazilian former footballer who played as a forward. He competed in the men's tournament at the 1972 Summer Olympics.
