= Slitherine Software =

British video game developer and publisher

Slitherine Software UK Limited
- Company type: Private
- Industry: Video games
- Founded: 4 July 2000; 25 years ago
- Founder: Iain McNeil
- Headquarters: Epsom, United Kingdom
- Area served: International
- Products: Historical strategy games
- Website: www.slitherine.com

Slitherine Software UK Limited (also known as Slitherine Strategies) is a British video game developer and publisher founded on 25 June 2000. It is responsible for the production of a range of over 200 strategy and war video games. Slitherine developed and/or published a number of licensed games with brands including Battlestar Galactica, Warhammer 40,000, Starship Troopers, Horrible Histories and The History Channel. It also produces rules for a series of tabletop wargames called Field of Glory.

== History ==
Slitherine merged with Matrix Games in 2010. Slitherine works with the US military and defense contractors to supply simulation software. The primary simulation is a professional version of the commercial game Command Modern Air & Naval Operations. In 2014, Slitherine Group acquired Shenandoah Studio, American developer of Battle of the Bulge and Drive on Moscow.

== Games ==
Year	Title	Platform(s)
2002	Legion	Windows
2003	Chariots of War	Windows
2004	Spartan	Windows
2005	Legion Arena	Windows, Mac OS X
2007	Commander: Europe at War	Windows, Mac OS X, DS, PSP
2007	The History Channel: Great Battles of Rome	Windows, PS2, PSP
2008	Commander: Napoleon at War	Windows, Mac OS X
2009	History: Great Empires – Rome	Nintendo DS
2009	Horrible Histories: Ruthless Romans	Windows, Nintendo Wii, Nintendo DS
2009	Conquest! Medieval Realms	Windows, iOS, Android
2009	Field of Glory	Windows, Mac OS X
2010	History: Ice Road Truckers	PSP
2010	History: Egypt – Engineering an Empire	Windows, iOS, DS, PSP
2010	Battlefield Academy	Windows, Mac OS X, iOS, Xbox 360
2010	History: Great Battles – Medieval	Windows, PS3, Xbox 360, Android, iOS
2010	Gary Grigsby's War in the East	Windows
2011	Panzer Corps	Windows, iPadOS, macOS
2011	Advanced Tactics Gold	Windows
2011	Time of Fury	Windows
2012	Commander: The Great War	Windows, iOS
2013	Pandora: First Contact	Windows, macOS, Linux
2014	Battle Academy 2: Eastern Front	Windows, iOS, macOS
2014	Pike and Shot	Windows, iOS
2014	Warhammer 40,000: Armageddon	Windows, iOS, macOS
2015	Order of Battle: Pacific	Windows, macOS, Xbox One, PS4
2015	Star Hammer: The Vanguard Prophecy	Windows, macOS, iOS, Xbox One, PS4
2015	Battle of the Bulge	Windows, macOS
2015	Scourge of War: Waterloo	Windows, iOS
2015	Thirty Years' War	Windows
2016	Victory and Glory: Napoleon	Windows
2016	Last Days of Old Earth	Windows
2016	Sengoku Jidai: Shadow of the Shogun	Windows
2016	Drive on Moscow	Windows
2017	Warhammer 40,000: Sanctus Reach	Windows
2017	Afghanistan '11	Windows, Android
2017	Gettysburg: The Tide Turns	Windows
2017	Battlestar Galactica Deadlock	Windows, PS4, Xbox One, Switch
2017	Field of Glory II	Windows
2018	Empires Apart	Windows
2018	Warhammer 40,000: Gladius – Relics of War	Windows, Linux
2019	Field of Glory: Empires	Windows
2020	Panzer Corps 2	Windows
2020	Shadow Empire	Windows
2020	ICBM	Windows
2021	Field of Glory II: Medieval	Windows
2021	Warhammer 40,000: Battlesector	Windows, PS4, Xbox One, Xbox Series X/S
2022	Distant Worlds 2	Windows
2022	Starship Troopers: Terran Command	Windows
2022	Master of Magic	Windows
2024	ICBM: Escalation	Windows
2024	Stargate: Timekeepers	Windows
2024	Terminator: Dark Fate - Defiance	Windows
2024	Headquarters: World War II	Windows
2024	Field of Glory: Kingdoms	Windows
2025	Broken Arrow	Windows

== Other media ==
Alongside their video games, Slitherine publishes a series of manuals for their tabletop wargame Field of Glory. The game is primarily set in the Ancient and Medieval time periods of European and Middle Eastern History. There are also plans to expand the game to include the Renaissance and Napoleonic Wars. Each new setting will have its own rules system and set of companion books.

A game engine built by Slitherine was used on the TV series Deadliest Warrior.

== Military Applications ==
A number of Slitherine's games have been used for the purposes of military application. Matrix Games the arm of Slitherine who specialise in such applications lists, The US Air Force, [dstl], US Marine Corps, US Navy, Luftwaffe, Boeing, BAE Systems, and Lockheed Martin as the organisations Slitherine works with to develop wargames. In 2015 Slitherine collaborated with BAE Systems for Command: Modern Air/Naval Operations to be used for their purposes. In 2016 Slitherine's developers were invited to the Pentagon to demonstrate how their Command series could be used to simulate a number of potential scenarios. In an interview with People Make Games, a representative of the company claimed that the Pentagon was getting greater utility from Slitherine's games than their own internally produced wargames.
