= Mohsen Yazdani =

Iranian bodybuilding champion (born 1969)

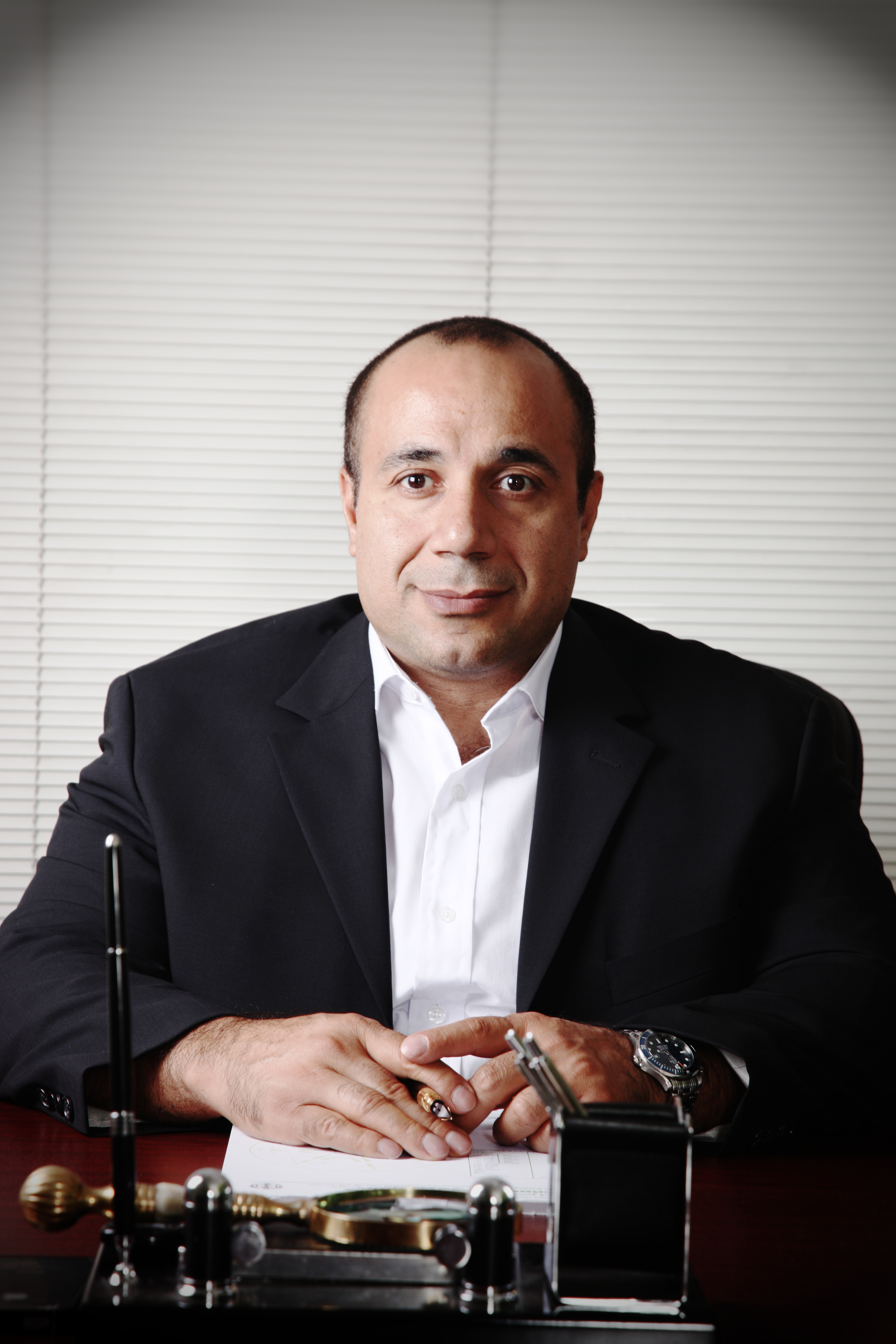
- Born: Mohsen Yazdanikachoei; August 1, 1969 (age 56)
- Citizenship: Iran
- Education: DBA

Mohsen Yazdani (born January 8, 1969, in Tehran) is an Iranian bodybuilding champion. In 1999 he was the first Iranian bodybuilder to achieve the gold medal in world championships and in the same year also received the most advanced bodybuilder of the year award from (IFBB). Yazdani is also the first ever Iranian bodybuilder to join IFBB pro. He is now active as the founder and CEO of Hirbod chain gyms.

== Biography ==
Mohsen Yazdani was born on January 8, 1969, in Tehran. When he was 12, he started his career in wrestling and in the same year he achieved the silver medal in the Tehran Youth Cup. He entered boxing when he was 16, and after he was done with his conscription he started his bodybuilding career by the advice of his friends Hamid Gheisari and Hadi Ghadir. He started his career in Olympic gym in 1991. He achieved his first medal ever by reaching third place in the national cup. A few months later he entered the national cup for the second time, and he was able to achieve the gold medal.

== Awards and titles ==
=== National titles ===
Row	Year	Title	Weight
1	1990	Third place	65 kg
2	1991	First place	70 kg
3	1992	First place	70 kg
4	1993	First place	70 kg
5	1994	First place	70 kg
6	1995	First place	70 kg
7	1996	First place	70 kg
8	1997	First place	70 kg
9	1998	First place	70 kg
10	1999	First place	70 kg

=== Asian titles ===
Row	Year	Title	Weight
1	1993	Asian third place (Singapore)	65 kg
2	1994	Asian third place (Malaysia)	70 kg
3	1994	Best Asian figurist (Malaysia)	70 kg
4	1995	Second place (China)	70 kg

=== International titles ===
Row	Year	Title	Weight
1	1999	Bayern Munchen International	Free weight
2	1999	First place - European international	80 kg
3	1999	First place - European international	Free weight
4	1999	First place - European international	70 kg
5	1999	Champion of champions of Europe	Overall

=== World titles ===
Row	Year	Title	Weight
1	1998	World second place (Turkey)	70 kg
2	1999	World first place (Slovakia)	70 kg
3	1999	Most advanced bodybuilder and first place (Slovakia)	70 kg
4	2000	Fourth place (Malaysia)	70 kg

=== Titles as Iran’s national team coach ===
Row	Year	Title
1	2003	Asian cup - third place (Bahrain)
2	2008	Asian cupABBF - first place (Thailand)
3	2008	World cupIFBB - second place (Bahrain)
4	2009	World cupWBPF - first place (Thailand)
5	2009	World cupWBPF - first place (Emirates)
6	2010	Asian cupWBPF - first place (Iran)
7	2010	World cupWBPF - first place (India)
