= America's Civil War =

American military magazine

- Frequency: Bimonthly
- Founder: Roy Morris Jr.
- First issue: 1987; 39 years ago
- Company: Weider History Group
- Country: United States
- Based in: Leesburg, Virginia
- Language: English
- ISSN: 1046-2899

America's Civil War was a full-color history magazine published bi-monthly which covered the American Civil War. It was established in 1987 by editor Roy Morris Jr. It carried articles about the battles, campaigns, leaders, and common soldiers of the Civil War. It contained essays on the way the war is remembered today as well as lengthy first-hand accounts of the war. In 2006 Stephen Petranek was named the editor-in-chief of the magazine.

America's Civil War, along with its sister publication Civil War Times, was published in Leesburg, Virginia, by the Weider History Group. The company bought the magazine from Primedia (now Rent Group) in 2006. In 2024, the Weider History Group ceased publication of the magazine.
