= Panzer Corps (video game) =

2011 video game

- Developer(s): The Lordz Games Studio; Flashback Games
- Publisher(s): Slitherine Software
- Designer(s): Alex Shargin
- Artist(s): Lukas Nijsten
- Writer(s): Frank Leone; Tim Delaney
- Composer(s): Alessandro Ponti
- Platform(s): Windows, iOS, macOS
- Release: Windows: NA: 11 July 2011; EU: 22 November 2011; iOS; 18 December 2013 macOS; 4 May 2017
- Genre(s): Computer wargame
- Mode(s): Single-player, multiplayer

Panzer Corps: Wehrmacht is a computer wargame developed by Lordz Games Studio and Flashback Games, and published by Slitherine Software for Windows, iOS, and macOS. A sequel, Panzer Corps 2, was released in March 2020.

== Gameplay ==
Panzer Corps is a turn-based strategic wargame played on a hex grid. It covers World War II from the German perspective.

== Release ==
Before Panzer Corps, lead designer Alex Shargin made a Panzer General fan remake, Panzer General Forever. Panzer Corps was announced on 2 December 2010. It was described as similar to Panzer General series. An iPad version was scheluded for third quarter of 2012 but it was delayed to December 2013. Panzer Corps Gold was released on 6 October 2016. It includes the main game and 17 expansion packs. A macOS port was released on 4 May 2017.

== Reception ==
Reception

Aggregate score
Aggregator	Score
Metacritic	80/100

Review scores
Publication	Score
4Players	(PC) 86%
GameSpot	(PC) 8/10
GameStar	(PC) 85%
PC Gamer (UK)	(PC) 81%
PC Games (DE)	(PC) 85%
PC PowerPlay	(PC) 8/10
Pocket Gamer	(iOS)

The PC and iOS versions received "favourable" reviews according to the review aggregation website Metacritic. Many compared the PC version to the Panzer General series. 4Players gave it a favorable review while it was still in development.

Daniel Shannon of GameSpot summarized: "Panzer Corps is a great turn-based strategic wargame that captures Panzer General's deep and involving classic gameplay." Tim Stone of PC Gamer UK said that the only negative aspect of the game was the steep price since there was "free fan-made versions of Panzer General 2 available". Luke Plunkett of Kotaku called it "one of the best strategy games you can get on the PC" in 2014.

== See also ==
- Warhammer 40,000: Armageddon, Slitherine's 2014 game that uses the engine from Panzer Corps
