= International Fitness and Bodybuilding Federation =

International professional sports governing body for bodybuilding and fitness

- Sport: Bodybuilding
- Category: Sports governing body
- Jurisdiction: International
- Abbreviation: IFBB; IFBB Federation; IFBB Amateur; IFBB Elite Pro
- Founded: 1946; 80 years ago
- Headquarters: Las Rozas de Madrid, Spain
- President: Rafael Santonja
- Vice presidents: Albert Busek (Europe); Javier Pollock (Caribbean); Aquiles De Cesare (South America); Paul Graham (South Pacific Oceania); Eng. Adel Fahim El Sayed (Africa); Malih Alaywan (Middle East); Sheikh Abdullah Al Khalifa (Asia)
- Director: Pamela Kagan
- Secretary: William Tierney

Official website
- www.ifbb.com

The International Fitness and Bodybuilding Federation (IFBB) is an international professional sports governing body for bodybuilding and fitness. Headquartered in Las Rozas de Madrid, it oversees many of the sport's major international events, notably the World and Continental Championships.

== History ==
In 1946, the IFBB was founded by brothers Ben and Joe Weider in Montreal, Canada, under the name "International Federation of Bodybuilders". The two founding countries were Canada and the United States. Ben Weider was the first IFBB President.

In 1965 the first IFBB Mr. Olympia was held; the IFBB's first contest. From 1966 to 1970, the Federation experienced rapid growth as Joe and Ben Weider promoted the organization globally. By 1970, the IFBB had directors in more than 50 countries worldwide and the IFBB had its footprint in Africa, Asia, Europe, Australia, North America, and South America.

On September 4, 1970, the IFBB held its 1st International Congress in Belgrade, Yugoslavia, where a Constitution was adopted and an Executive Council. In 1971 Jim Morris became the first openly gay IFBB professional bodybuilder. Also in 1971, the IFBB became a member of the Global Association of International Sports Federations (GAISF), now SportAccord. Upon receiving membership, the IFBB became the only official representative of bodybuilding to be recognized by world sport authorities. From the 1980s to his death in 2008, IFBB president Ben Weider petitioned the IOC for inclusion of bodybuilding in the Olympic Games. Although bodybuilding had never been on the Olympic Program, in 1998, the IOC granted the IFBB provisional recognition, which lasted nearly four years, but was withdrawn in 2001.

In 2004, the IFBB was renamed the International Federation of Bodybuilding and Fitness but retained the "IFBB" abbreviation. The following year, the IFBB adopted new IFBB Anti-Doping Rules following the World Anti-Doping Code. The IFBB Professional Section was legally split from the IFBB to form the IFBB Professional League, its own legal entity with its own rules and regulations. In turn, the IFBB Constitution became a governing document for the amateur sport only. In 2006, after 60 years, Ben Weider resigned from his role as president and Rafael Santonja from Spain was elected as the new president. The IFBB headquarters were moved to Las Rozas de Madrid, Spain. In 2010, Santonja was reelected for a second term, and in 2014, he was reelected for a third time at the IFBB World Congress in Brasília.

=== Name change ===
At some point the name has changed from International Federation of BodyBuilding and Fitness to the International Fitness and Bodybuilding Federation, this possibly occurred when the split between the IFBB Professional League / IFBB Amateur League in 2017 to distinguish the now two separate entities but both wanting to retain the IFBB abbreviation.

== Organization ==
The IFBB is registered under Spanish law as a nonprofit legal entity. The IFBB has a constitution, technical rules, anti-doping rules, and democratically elected executive council with four-year terms. The IFBB meets annually at its International Congress, held in conjunction with the Men's World Bodybuilding Championships. The IFBB is a founding member of the International World Games Association (IWGA) and also a member of the International Council of Sport Science and Physical Education (ICSSPE), the International Pierre de Coubertin Committee, and the International Council of Coach Education (ICCE). The IFBB is recognized by the Olympic Council of Asia (OCA), the Supreme Council for Sport in Africa, the Association of Pan-American Sport Federations (ACODEPA). The IFBB is also recognized by some 90 National Olympic Committees. The IFBB participates in several Regional Games recognized by the IOC including the Southeast Asian Games, the Asian Games, the South American Games, the Asian Beach Games, the Arab Games, the Pacific Games, the African Games, and the World Games. The IFBB has also participated at the Central American Games.

== Members ==
The IFBB affiliates over 190 National Federations which may also form Continental/Regional Federations.

== Competitions ==
The IFBB annually holds more than 2,500 competitions at the local, national, regional, continental, and World Championships levels. Competitions are held for the various sports disciplines the IFBB has recognized, many of which are organized with juniors, seniors, and masters divisions. Some notable IFBB contests include Mr. Olympia, Ms. Olympia, the IFBB Men's World Bodybuilding Championships, the IFBB Men's World Classic Bodybuilding Championships, the IFBB Men's World Physique Championships, the IFBB World Fitness Championships, the Arnold Classic, and the World Amateur Bodybuilding Championships.

== See also ==
- IFBB Hall of Fame
