= World History Group =

American magazine publishing company

- Parent company: Archetype (Regent, L.P.)
- Founded: 2006
- Founder: Eric Weider
- Country of origin: United States
- Headquarters location: Leesburg, Virginia
- Publication types: Magazines
- Official website: historynet.com

World History Group is a magazine publishing company headquartered in Leesburg, Virginia. It was founded in 2006 as the Weider History Group by Eric Weider, son of fitness entrepreneur Ben Weider and nephew of Joe Weider, who also current president of Schiff Nutrition International.

The company published 11 titles reaching 600,000 readers. It operates HistoryNet.com, a website that contains daily features, photo galleries, and articles published in various magazines.

In 2015, the Weider History Group was acquired by the private equity firm Regent, L.P., and renamed World History Group. Regent consolidated its media holdings under a new publishing entity, Archetype, in 2019.

The company ceased publishing in 2024.

== List of publications ==
=== Print ===
Weider History Group
1. Armchair General – LCCN 2003-215695; ISSN 1546-055X; OCLC 52872485
World History Group
2. America's Civil War – LCCN 88-649875, LCCN 2011-236567; ISSN 1046-2899; OCLC 18111753 (all editions)
3. American History – LCCN 94-644504; ISSN 1076-8866; OCLC 30148811 (all editions)
4. Aviation History – LCCN 94-646367; ISSN 1076-8858; OCLC 30471031 (all editions)
5. Civil War Times – LCCN 2003-233046; ISSN 1546-9980; OCLC 51269784 (all editions)
6. MHQ: The Quarterly Journal of Military History – LCCN 89-647289; ISSN 1040-5992; OCLC 18462176 (all editions)
7. Military History – LCCN sf93-93515; ISSN 0889-7328; OCLC 11492012 (all editions)
8. Vietnam – LCCN sf93-93508; ISSN 1046-2902; OCLC 17941016 (all editions)
9. Wild West – LCCN 90-656080; ISSN 1046-4638; OCLC 18654422 (all editions)
10. World War II – LCCN 90-660022; ISSN 0898-4204; OCLC 13545127 (all editions)

=== Defunct ===
11. British Heritage (acquired in 2014 by Kliger Heritage Media, a company also founded in 2014 by Jack Kliger, the magazine was renamed British Heritage Travel) – ISSN 0195-2633

== Past and subsequent publishers to World History Group ==
- Cowles History Group, a division of Cowles Magazines, Leesburg, Virginia
- Primedia Enthusiast Publications of PRIMEDIA Special Interest Publications, Leesburg, Virginia
- Weider History Group, Leesburg, Virginia
- Empire Press, Herndon, Leesburg
- HistoryNet, Leesburg, Tysons, Vienna, and Arlington, Virginia
