= PCGamesN =

British online video game magazine

- Website type: Video games
- Available in: English
- Founded: 2012; 14 years ago
- Owner: NetworkN
- Editor: Cameron Bald
- Website: www.pcgamesn.com
- Commercial: Yes
- Registration: No
- Current status: Active

PCGamesN is a British website with articles about PC gaming and hardware.

== History ==
Parent company Network N was founded by James Binns (formerly of Future Publishing) in late May 2012. PCGamesN launched the following month.

PCGamesN's first website was designed to host traditional games coverage alongside aggregated and user-created content, which was presented to the reader in channels dedicated to major gaming franchises. Over the course of two redesigns since launch, it has evolved to fully embrace a more traditional approach, and now produces original coverage across the gamut of PC games and hardware.

The launch team included Tim Edwards, former editor of PC Gamer. PCGamesN added ten new channels and two new writers for a total of seven staff writers in August 2012. The website added editorial staff from GamesMaster and the Official PlayStation Magazine in 2015, most notably new editor-in-chief Joel Gregory. Gregory brought in staff from Edge magazine and Kotaku UK in 2017, concluded the site's transition away from its experimental first form, and oversaw a redesign, unveiling PCGamesN's current layout in August 2018. Network N Media has since launched updated versions of its other owned sites: The Loadout, Pocket Tactics, Wargamer, The Digital Fix, and Custom PC.

Ben Maxwell took over as editor of PCGamesN in May 2018, before stepping up to a new leadership role within the publishing group in November 2020. He was succeeded in 2020 by Richard Scott-Jones. In 2023, Cameron Bald was appointed Editor of PCGamesN.
