= Armchair General (magazine) =

American military history magazine

- Cover of the May 2015 issue featuring Ulysses S. Grant and Robert E. Lee
- Editor: Jerry D. Morelock
- Categories: Military History
- Frequency: Bi-Monthly
- Publisher: Eric Weider
- Founded: 2003
- First issue: February 2004
- Final issue: May 2015
- Company: Weider History Group
- Country: US
- Based in: Thousands Oaks, California
- Language: English
- Website: www.armchairgeneral.com

Armchair General was a bimonthly American military history magazine published by Weider History Group. It was in circulation between February 2004 and May 2015. The headquarters of the magazine was in Thousands Oaks, California.

== History and profile ==
Armchair General was established in 2003. The first issue appeared in February 2004. It featured tactical situations which can be resolved by sending solutions to the magazine's staff. Modern warfare is also discussed in the form of "dispatches" (news briefs), movie, video game and war game reviews. In May 2015, the magazine stopped print publication.

The Armchair General website features complementary material as well as its own articles, many of which are written by readers of the print magazine and/or members of the site's online forum community.

In June 2005, the Chicago Tribune ranked Armchair General Magazine number 25 in their list of "Best 50 Magazines".
