= Wargamer (website) =

Strategy gaming website

- Available in: English
- Owner: Network N
- Creator: Mario Kroll
- Editor: Mollie Russell
- Website: wargamer.com
- Launched: September 1995; 31 years ago
- Current status: Active

Wargamer (originally The Wargamer) is a British website specialising in tabletop games, with a particular focus on miniature wargames, tabletop role-playing games, and strategic card games. It also publishes articles on various digital wargames and strategy games for the PC and other digital platforms. It is currently owned and operated by Network N. It has several sister sites, including PCGamesN, Pocket Tactics, The Loadout, and The Digital Fix, which cover video games and home entertainment respectively.

== History ==
The Wargamer was founded in September 1995 by Mario R. Kroll originally with the purpose of being a website to facilitate matchmaking play-by-email opponents for computer wargames. Its initial support included the Panzer General, Steel Panthers and the Close Combat series, although it quickly expanded to cover titles like Norm Koger's Age of Rifles, TalonSoft's Battleground series, and a number of HPS Simulations games. Eventually, The Wargamer evolved to provide editorial coverage, game reviews, news reporting and served as a custom scenario repository for nearly all war or strategy video games that supported custom scenario creation.

It suffered an outage for about ten days and data loss when hackers used a Microsoft FrontPage vulnerability for its defacement on 7–8 December 2012. As Kroll later said, the hacking incident was "the final straw" in his decision to sell the website after facing nearly two years of financial hardship. He contacted Matrix Games' owner David Heath, with whom he had cooperated in the past for making The Gamers Net (which The Wargamer was briefly part of), to arrange a deal with Shaun Wallace of MilitaryGamer, a website belonging to Heath. On 19 February 2003, Kroll announced that his site to be acquired by Virtual Business Designs, Inc. owning MilitaryGamer; it was merged with the latter in March.

The Wargamer was previously part of the Strategy Allies Network, together with Armchair General and HistoryNet,—the affiliation has since disbanded.

In 2010, Slitherine Software merged with the parent company of The Wargamer, Matrix Games.

In 2015, it was paired with mobile-strategy website Pocket Tactics when the latter was acquired by the Slitherine Group of companies. The definite article was dropped from its logo in February that year.

In 2017, it was joined by a third companion website when Strategy Gamer was launched in April. In February 2018, all three websites were sold to Network N. Ltd.

From 2018 to 2020, Joe Robinson was editor in chief of Wargamer (as well as of Pocket Tactics and Strategy Gamer).

Then, in January 2021, Network N relaunched Wargamer, with Alex Evans taking over as editor. The website launched with a new design, branding, and petrol-blue colour scheme, as well as a new editorial mandate to cover tabletop games of all kinds, alongside digital wargames.

Since its 2021 relaunch, Wargamer's expanded focus has included significantly more coverage of miniature wargames, collectible card games, board games, tabletop role-playing games (including Dungeons & Dragons 5th edition), as well as Warhammer 40,000, Warhammer Age of Sigmar, and other Games Workshop tabletop miniature wargames.

In September 2026 Mollie Russell took over from Alex Evans as Editor of Wargamer.

== Recognition ==
Wargamer has received recognition for excellence in content, including several mentions via PC Gamer's military gaming column, authored by William R. Trotter. At its height of popularity, Wargamer enjoyed over a million monthly visitors and had incorporated Pie's Tactics, which at the time was the leading website for the tactical video game series Rainbow Six and Rogue Spear by Red Storm Entertainment. In spring 2001, it was ranked 66th out of the 100 most popular gaming websites by Hot100.com.

The site also achieved recognition outside its niche around 2002, when it was recommended by PC Magazine and the generalist gaming book The Rough Guide to Videogaming. The site's importance for the computer wargaming genre, usually deprived of reviews in the traditional wargaming media of the time, was academically recognised in the same year.
