= Index of Windows games (K) =

This is an index of Microsoft Windows games.

This list has been split into multiple pages. Please use the Table of Contents to browse it.

Title	Released	Developer	Publisher
Kaan: Barbarian's Blade	2003	Eko Software SARL	DreamCatcher Interactive
Kamaitachi no Yoru ×3	2024		Spike Chunsoft
Kane & Lynch: Dead Men	2007	IO Interactive	Eidos Interactive
Kane & Lynch 2: Dog Days	2010	IO Interactive	Square Enix Europe
Kango Shicyauzo	2001	Trabulance	Trabulance, G-Collections
Kao the Kangaroo	2000	Tate Interactive	Licop Empik Multimedia, Titus Interactive
Kao the Kangaroo	2022	Tate Interactive	Tate Interactive
Kao the Kangaroo: Mystery of the Volcano	2005	Tate Interactive	Cenega, n3vrf41l Publishing
Kara no Shōjo	2008	Innocent Grey	Innocent Grey
Karma II	2009	Dragonfly, Futureport, Blueside	Dragonfly
Kasparov Chessmate	2003	The Learning Company	Jamdat Mobile
Kathy Rain	2016	Clifftop Games	Raw Fury
Kaze no Uta	2002	Milk Soft	Milk Soft
Kelly Slater's Pro Surfer	2002	Treyarch, Babaroga	Activision
Kena: Bridge of Spirits	2021	Ember Lab	Ember Lab
Kholat	2015	IMGN.PRO	IMGN.PRO
Kiki Kaikai	2004	MediaKite	Taito
Kikokugai: The Cyber Slayer	2002	Nitroplus	Nitroplus
Kill the Brickman	2020	Doontsaur	Poncle
Kill Switch	2003	Namco	Namco
Killer Frequency	2023	Team17	Team17
Killing Floor	2009	Tripwire Interactive	Tripwire Interactive
Killing Time	1996	Studio 3DO	Studio 3DO, Intrepid Software
King Arthur II: The Role-Playing Wargame	2012	NeocoreGames	Paradox Interactive
King Arthur: The Role-Playing Wargame	2009	NeocoreGames	Paradox Interactive, Ubisoft, E-Frontier
King Kong	2005	Ubisoft Montpellier, Ubisoft Bucharest	Ubisoft
King of Dragon Pass	1999	A Sharp, LLC	A Sharp, LLC
King's Bounty: Armored Princess	2009	Katauri Interactive	1C Company
King's Bounty: Dark Side	2014	1C-Softclub	1C Company
King's Bounty: The Legend	2008	Katauri Interactive	1C Company
King's Bounty: Warriors of the North	2012	1C-Softclub	1C Company
King's Quest: Mask of Eternity	1998	Sierra Studios	Sierra Studios
Kingdom Come: Deliverance	2018	Warhorse Studios	Warhorse Studios, Deep Silver
Kingdom Come: Deliverance II	2025	Warhorse Studios	Deep Silver
Kingdom Under Fire II	2010	BLUESIDE Inc.	
Kingdoms of Amalur: Reckoning	2012	Big Huge Games	38 Studios, Electronic Arts
Kingpin: Life of Crime	1999	Xatrix Entertainment	Interplay Entertainment
The Kings' Crusade	2010	NeocoreGames	Paradox Interactive
Kiss: Psycho Circus: The Nightmare Child	2000	Third Law Interactive	Gathering of Developers
Kizuato	1996	Leaf	Aquaplus
KKND2: Krossfire	1998	Beam Software	Atari
kkrieger	2004	.theprodukkt	
Knight Online	2004	MGame Corporation	MGame Corporation
Knight Rider: The Game	2002	Davilex Games	Davilex Games
Knights and Merchants: The Shattered Kingdom	1998	Joymania Entertainment	Interactive Magic, TopWare Interactive
Knights of Honor	2004	Crytek Black Sea	Sunflowers Interactive Entertainment Software
Knights of Honor II: Sovereign	2022	Black Sea Games	THQ Nordic
Knights of the Temple II	2005	Cauldron	Playlogic Entertainment, Evolved Games
Knights of the Temple: Infernal Crusade	2004	Starbreeze Studios	TDK Mediactive
KnightShift	2003	Reality Pump Studios	Zuxxez Entertainment
Koala Lumpur: Journey to the Edge	1997	Broderbund	Colossal Pictures
Kohan: Immortal Sovereigns	2001	TimeGate Studios	Strategy First
Kona	2017	Parabole	Parabole
Kono Aozora ni Yakusoku o	2006	Giga	Giga
Koutetsu no Kishi 2: Sabaku no Rommel Shougun	2002	General Support	General Support
Krazy Ivan	1996	Psygnosis	Psygnosis
Kudos	2006	Positech Games	Positech Games
Kudos: Rock Legend	2007	Positech Games	Positech Games
Kult: Heretic Kingdoms	2005	3D People, Merscom	Got Game
Kung Fu Panda	2008	Beenox	Activision
Kunitsu-Gami: Path of the Goddess	2024	Capcom	Capcom
Kusari	2005	Leaf	Aquaplus
