= King's Bounty =

1990 video game

- Developer: New World Computing
- Publishers: New World Computing; Electronic Arts (Genesis)
- Designer: Jon Van Caneghem
- Programmer: Mark Caldwell
- Artist: Vincent DeQuattro
- Composers: Rob Wallace (Genesis); Takeshi Abo (PC-98, FM Towns)
- Series: King's Bounty
- Platforms: Commodore 64, Amiga, MS-DOS, Apple II, Mac, Genesis, FM Towns, PC-98, Windows
- Release: 1990: MS-DOS; 1990: C64; 1990: Amiga; 1991: Genesis; 1994: FM Towns; 1994: PC-98
- Genres: Role-playing, turn-based strategy
- Mode: Single-player

King's Bounty is a turn-based fantasy video game designed by Jon Van Caneghem and published by New World Computing in 1990. The game follows the player's character, a hero of King Maximus, appointed with the job of retrieving the Sceptre of Order from the forces of chaos, led by Arech Dragonbreath. King's Bounty is notably considered the forerunner of the Heroes of Might and Magic series of games.

A Sega Genesis port was developed and released in North America on February 21, 1991, with a multitude of graphical changes. The gameplay was also modified to incorporate real time overworld exploration.

In 2008, a spiritual sequel titled King's Bounty: The Legend was released. This was followed by additional sequels including King's Bounty: Armored Princess, King's Bounty: Crossworlds, King's Bounty: Warriors of the North, King's Bounty: Dark Side and King's Bounty II.

== Gameplay ==
The player leads the hero and his army across the four continents, acquiring up to 25 pieces of a map revealing the hidden location to the Sceptre of Order before King Maximus dies. Various details of this task are left to player's discretion, allowing for flexible gameplay. For instance, not all the scattered map sections are required; if the player is able to correctly determine the location of the sceptre's burial spot before acquiring all 25 map pieces, the game is won. If the sceptre is not recovered before King Maximus dies (the time varies depending on difficulty setting), the game ends in defeat. The location of the sceptre, the artifacts and which castles the villains inhabit are all randomized each game, adding to its replayability.

The hero is given a weekly commission from the king to track down 17 villains across the 4 continents. With each defeat of the progressively stronger villain's army, the character claims (along with the reward money for the "King's Bounty" on that villain) another piece of the map revealing the sceptre's burial location. Along the way, numerous treasure chests are encountered scattered across the map. Some of these chests represent various events that increase the hero's inherent abilities, such as magical strength or weekly income; others may contain one of eight artifacts, which themselves provide a piece of the map, in addition to conferring their own unique powers.

As the player explores, he encounters various types of creatures native to the different continents, some of which are able to be recruited. Most of these creatures are significant upgrades from the normal human forces available to the player at the King's castle, and are required to defeat the tougher villain armies. However, as their strength increases, so does the amount of gold required to retain them, which must be paid weekly. Although the player's commission can be raised in a variety of ways, such as maintaining a garrison of forces at a captured castle. If their costs exceed their income, they run out of money, their army will abandon them. Furthermore, each of the various army units have either a positive, neutral, or negative predisposition towards other. An army composed of creatures that "dislike" each other lowers their "morale", making them less effective in combat. Conversely, recruiting creatures which share a positive predisposition towards each other increases their morale. Assembling an "ideal" army is another open-ended aspect of the game.

King's Bounty features four selectable hero classes: Barbarian, Knight, Paladin, and Sorceress. Each class varies in magical ability, starting troop power, natural leadership ability, and Commission (income per week). As the king's bounty is collected on more villains, the king increases the rank of the hero. This rank determines in part what troops the hero may recruit, and more importantly, the strength of the hero's attributes.

Combat in King's Bounty occurs when sieging an occupied castle or engaging a wandering army on the main map. Combat turns are simple, with the player's army moving first, followed by the opponent's. Armies are stack-based, with any one stack taking up one square on the battlefield. Stacks can represent anything from one cavalry unit to thousands. The player can use a number of either Adventuring spells, only used in the overworld, or Combat spells. Adventuring spells allow movement to Towns, Castles, create bridges, increase leadership (Raise Control), stop time for some number of moves, finds the villain's castle, or creates an army stack if the player has a space (Instant Army). During combat, the player can cast one spell per turn that cause damage via lightning, fireball, or turn undead, can resurrect dead troops, teleport a unit to an open position, freeze an enemy unit so it cannot move, or increase an existing troop through cloning (Clone).

== Amiga ==
The game's graphics were completely redone (by Bonita Long-Hemsath and Kenneth L. Mayfield). The hair and skin color of many characters were changed, and many of the sprites representing armies underwent redesign. Mouse support was also added making most parts of the screen interactive, by clicking or hovering.

== King's Bounty for Sega Mega Drive/Genesis ==
=== Gameplay changes ===
The Mega Drive/Genesis port of King's Bounty is notably different from the PC version of the game, the most obvious change being the move into the realm of real time. Armies on the overworld now move on their own and automatically engage the hero. This makes the game arguably more difficult, as a careful player of the DOS version could often maneuver past several wandering armies at a time without being successfully engaged. Also affected is the game's time limit. Although it has become harsher, it is somewhat balanced by the fact that trekking across desert squares no longer takes 1 day, and changing continents no longer ends the week.

Gone from this version of King's Bounty are all keyboard controls and hero naming capabilities.

=== Graphical changes ===
The game uses the same improved graphic set Amiga version had. As a minor change, wandering armies are now displayed according to their most powerful stack, as opposed to the generic stacks of the DOS version that corresponded to the current continent. Nevertheless, the graphics remain trademark of New World Computing, with other games like The Faery Tale Adventure appearing similar but featuring different gameplay.

== King's Bounty and Heroes of Might and Magic ==
King's Bounty is widely considered to be the precursor for much of the gameplay in the Heroes of Might and Magic series (the Might and Magic series being the basis for the storyline), both of which were published by New World Computing and designed by Jon Van Caneghem. Among the many similarities, an emphasis on hero development and combat style are especially prominent in both. In the introduction to the player manual of Heroes III, van Caneghem credits King's Bounty as the precursor to Heroes of Might and Magic. King's Bounty is included in some HoMM anthologies, including the Heroes of Might and Magic Compendium and Heroes of Might and Magic Millennium Edition. It is also included in the Windows 95 version of the original Heroes of Might and Magic.

The 2001 PlayStation 2 title Heroes of Might and Magic: Quest for the Dragon Bone Staff is an enhanced remake of King's Bounty made by 3DO.

== Successors ==
In 2007, the Russian game publisher 1C Company purchased the property rights to the King's Bounty franchise and attached the name to a title being developed by Katauri Interactive, a company located in Kaliningrad. Prior to the name change, the game's working title was Battle Lord. The game was published in 2008 as King's Bounty: The Legend.

In 2009, King's Bounty: Armored Princess was released using the same engine as King's Bounty: The Legend, with a new heroine and other minor new elements.

In 2010, an expansion for Armoured Princess was released as a standalone game called King's Bounty: Crossworlds. This includes the Orcs on the March expansion, two new independent campaigns, and an editor.

In 2012, King's Bounty: Warriors of the North was released, still using the original engine from the prior games, but with new units, protagonist and story. In 2014 the Ice and Fire DLC was released for the game, adding new locations, new creatures and a creature skill system.

In 2014, King's Bounty: Dark Side was released, where the players play as the dark side and fight against the light side.

A direct sequel to King's Bounty: The Legend, King's Bounty II, was released in 2021.

== Fan projects ==
An unofficial fan sequel, usually called "King's Bounty 2", was developed in 1992. The author of the sequel is a Ukrainian programmer Sergiy Prokofiev. All text in the game is in Russian, and the messages often feature Russia-specific folklore. No English-language version of the game has been available.

In August 2015, another game called "Royal Bounty HD" was released, which added many of the Heroes of Might and Magic gameplay improvements to the core King's Bounty concept.

A free unofficial version of the original game (with original graphics and expanded storyline) was published in 2015 by Russian programmer Sergei Markoff, also known as the author of the free chess engine SmarThink. The game includes a lot of easter eggs, science jokes and various additional objects like Titan of Braavos and so on.

== King's Bounty board game ==
Task Force Games released a King's Bounty board game in 1991. Like its computer game counterpart, the object of the game is to catch villains in a fantasy setting, but the villains' names are different, and three designers, not including Van Caneghem, are credited for the creation of the game. The cover of both the computer game and the board game versions are the same, implying some connection between the two.

During the brief period that TFG was owned by New World Computing, the two companies attempted the first ever simultaneous release of a board game and computer game. The two versions of King's Bounty wound up releasing about 9 months apart, and after NWC had sold TFG to former Games Workshop Vice-President John Olsen. Future versions of New World Computing's version of King's Bounty were called Heroes of Might & Magic to avoid confusion between the two different games that had been designed by different designers. TFG kept the name as the original concept had come from them and the board game designer. TFG never wound up releasing a second version of the King's Bounty board game.

The common cover art came from one of TFG's regular artists.

== Reception ==
Computer Gaming World's reviewer stated that although the game was short (he finished it in six hours), the narrow time limit, exciting battles, and opportunity to gain power made it appealing to adventurers. The game was reviewed in 1991 in Dragon #166 by Jager McConnell in "The Role of Computers" column. The reviewers gave the game 3 out of 5 stars. The Lessers reviewed the Sega Genesis version of the game in Dragon #175, also giving that version of the game 3 out of 5 stars. The Lessers reviewed the DOS version of the game in 1992 in Dragon #187, again giving that version of the game 3 stars. Retroactively, the game was reviewed by Sega-16.com, who - in consideration of its influence on the Heroes of Might and Magic series - gave it a perfect 10.0 score.
