= Kao Challengers =

2005 video game

- Developer: Tate Interactive
- Publisher: Atari Europe
- Producer: Paul Leskowicz
- Designer: Wojciech Biliński
- Programmer: Jan Matląg
- Composers: Bartosz Idzi; Mateusz Ryszka
- Series: Kao the Kangaroo
- Platform: PlayStation Portable
- Release: EU: October 28, 2005; NA: March 29, 2006
- Genre: Action-Adventure
- Modes: Single-player, multiplayer

Kao Challengers is an action-adventure video game featuring Kao the Kangaroo developed by Tate Interactive and published by Atari Europe. Challengers is an enhanced port of Kao the Kangaroo: Round 2, released a year earlier in Europe.

== Plot ==
Kao Challengers has the same storyline as Kao the Kangaroo: Round 2.

== Gameplay ==
The game contains over 20 levels in 5 worlds which have their own unique environment. There are also some bonus levels included. In the levels there are over 30 enemies with 7 fighting techniques. Enemies all have their own different personalities which can easily be recognised from the way they attack and defend. Kao can do many actions such as flying, throwing boomerangs, cones and other objects, swimming and skating. Cut scenes explain the story as the player progresses through the levels to help and guide them. Vehicles can be driven which include a snowboard, catapult, pelican, water barrel and motor boat. There is also a multiplayer mode where players can use 15 different weapons including bombs, fire flamer and a magneto. A lot of special effects have been put into the game such as motion blur and blending to make it a graphically enjoyable video game.

== Reception ==
Reception

Aggregate scores
Aggregator	Score
GameRankings	56.12%
Metacritic	57/100

Review scores
Publication	Score
Eurogamer	3/10
GameSpot	6.3/10
IGN	6/10
PlayStation Official Magazine – UK	6/10
PSM3	69%

The game has received mixed reviews, as GameRankings gave it a score of 56.12%, while Metacritic gave it a score of 57 out of 100.

== Sequel ==
The sequel to this game and Round 2 was titled Kao the Kangaroo: Mystery of the Volcano, and was released for the PC in 2006 exclusively in some non-English countries, serving as the character's swan song until 2022, when the series was rebooted.
