= Knights of honor =

Knights of Honor can refer to multiple things:

- Knights of Honor, a fraternity from 1873
- Knights of Honor (video game), a game situated in medieval Europe
