= Kao the Kangaroo (2000 video game) =

- Developers: X-Ray Interactive; Titus Interactive Studio (GBA)
- Publishers: POL: Licomp Empik Multimedia; WW: Titus Interactive
- Series: Kao the Kangaroo
- Platforms: Windows, Dreamcast, Game Boy Advance
- Release: Windows, Dreamcast: POL: November 23, 2000; EU: December 8, 2000; NA: February 16, 2001; Game Boy Advance: NA: December 11, 2001; EU: December 14, 2001
- Genre: Platform
- Mode: Single-player

Kao the Kangaroo (Polish: Kangurek Kao) is a platform video game developed by X-Ray Interactive for Microsoft Windows, Dreamcast and Game Boy Advance. During development, the game was known as Denis the Kangaroo.

== Plot ==
Kao is a young kangaroo living with his family in the jungle when they are one day captured by a ruthless hunter and his goons. It's up to Kao to drive the invaders from his home and save his family.

== Development and release ==
Development of Kao the Kangaroo began in Poland in 1997 with a four-person team, two of whose members were still attending secondary school. According to Tate development team leader Jakub Kojder, the developers initially financed their work using personal savings and money earned assembling computers. The project subsequently attracted the attention of a French video game publisher, which financed its completion.

In the United Kingdom, Virgin Interactive promoted the game's upcoming release by offering a £2,000 reward for the capture of the so-called "Lewisham kangaroo". The publicity campaign was reported by The Guardian in November 2000.

A two-dimensional adaptation developed by Titus Interactive was released for the Game Boy Advance in December 2001.

The game, alongside its sequels, was added to GOG.com in February 2021.

The game was released on Steam and the Epic Games Store on April 27, 2023.

== Reception ==
Reception

Aggregate score
Aggregator	Score		
Aggregator	Dreamcast	GBA	PC
Metacritic	63/100	52/100	60/100

Review scores
Publication	Score		
Publication	Dreamcast	GBA	PC
AllGame	2.5/5	N/A	N/A
Computer Games Strategy Plus	N/A	N/A	2.5/5
Electronic Gaming Monthly	6/10	N/A	N/A
EP Daily	6.5/10	6/10	N/A
Game Informer	7/10	N/A	N/A
GameRevolution	D−	N/A	N/A
GameSpot	7.1/10	2.7/10	7.4/10
GameZone	N/A	7.5/10	N/A
IGN	6.2/10	5/10	5.2/10
Next Generation	3/5	N/A	N/A
Nintendo Power	N/A	4/5	N/A

Kao the Kangaroo received "mixed" reviews on all platforms according to the review aggregation website Metacritic; the Dreamcast version received an average score of 63 out of 100, based on 8 critic reviews, the PC version and average of 60 out of 100 based on 4 critic reviews, and the GBA fared notably poorer, with an average score of 52 out of 100, based on 8 critic reviews.

Greg Orlando of NextGen called the Dreamcast version "A marsuperior adventure. Pardon the horrible pun – please.", awarding it three stars out of five.

The original game sold more than 45,000 copies in Poland, according to a 2022 retrospective published by Nano Gaming News. By April 2002, approximately 100,000 copies had been sold worldwide, according to Polish magazine Wprost.

== Legacy ==
A sequel, Kao the Kangaroo: Round 2, was released for the PlayStation 2, GameCube, Xbox, and Windows on April 15, 2005. About 5 months later, a remake of the second game called Kao Challengers was released on October 28 only for the PSP. Later in 2005, a second sequel called Kao the Kangaroo: Mystery of the Volcano was released only for Windows. A reboot, also called Kao the Kangaroo, was published in 2022.
