= Urban Trial Freestyle =

2013 video game

- Developers: Tate Interactive, Strangelands
- Publisher: Tate Interactive
- Platforms: Nintendo 3DS iOS; PC; PlayStation 3 PlayStation Vita
- Release: February 19, 2013: PlayStation 3, PlayStation Vita; WW: February 19, 2013 Nintendo 3DS; WW: June 27, 2013 PC; WW: September 18, 2013 iOS; WW: July 9, 2014
- Genre: Racing
- Mode: Single-player

Urban Trial Freestyle is a 2013 racing video game developed and published by Tate Interactive. It was released for the PlayStation Vita, Nintendo 3DS, iOS, PC, and PlayStation 3.

== Gameplay ==
Urban Trial Freestyle is a racing game.

== Development and release ==
Inspiration for the game came from Julien Dupont, a Red Bull Racing athlete. Dupont himself worked closely with the developers to help get the look and feel right for the game.

Urban Trial Freestyle was first released for the PlayStation 3 and PlayStation Vita on the PlayStation Network on February 19, 2013. It was later added to the Nintendo 3DS's Nintendo eShop service on June 27. A Steam version of the game was released on September 18. Later versions for the iPhone and iPad on July 9, 2014.

== Sequels ==
A sequel, Urban Trial Freestyle 2, was released exclusively on Nintendo 3DS in Europe on March 30, 2017, in North America on April 20, 2017, and in Japan on May 17, 2017. A new installment, Urban Trial Playground, was released on the Nintendo Switch in North America on April 5, 2018, in Europe on April 25, 2018, and in Japan on May 24, 2018. A PC version was released via Steam on April 5, 2019.

== Reception ==
Reception

Aggregate score
Aggregator	Score				
Aggregator	3DS	iOS	PC	PS Vita	PS3
Metacritic	64/100	61/100	58/100	71/100	64/100

Review scores
Publication	Score				
Publication	3DS	iOS	PC	PS Vita	PS3
1Up.com	N/A	N/A	N/A	C+	C+
Destructoid	N/A	N/A	N/A	6.5/10	N/A
Electronic Gaming Monthly	N/A	N/A	N/A	N/A	5/10
Eurogamer	N/A	N/A	N/A	N/A	4/10
Game Informer	N/A	N/A	N/A	N/A	5.5/10
GameRevolution	N/A	N/A	1.5/5	N/A	N/A
Nintendo Life	7/10	N/A	N/A	N/A	N/A
Nintendo World Report	7/10	N/A	N/A	N/A	N/A
Official Nintendo Magazine	73%	N/A	N/A	N/A	N/A
Pocket Gamer	N/A	7/10	N/A	7/10	N/A

Urban Trial Freestyle received mixed reviews from critics across all platforms.

By April 2014, the game was one of the best-selling games for the PlayStation Network, ranking #10 for the PlayStation 3 and #3 for the Vita.
