= King's Bounty: The Legend =

2008 video game

- Developer: Katauri Interactive
- Publisher: 1C Company (Note: Distributed by Atari in North America.)
- Composers: Mikhail Kostylev; TriHorn Productions
- Series: King's Bounty
- Platforms: Microsoft Windows; Mac OS X
- Release: Windows: RU: April 25, 2008; NA: September 23, 2008; UK: February 13, 2009; Mac OS X: WW: April 5, 2012
- Genre: Tactical role-playing
- Mode: Single-player

King's Bounty: The Legend (Russian: King's Bounty: Легенда о рыцаре) is a tactical role-playing video game developed by Russian studio Katauri Interactive and published by 1C Company for Microsoft Windows in 2008 and Mac OS X in 2012. The game is based upon the King's Bounty property released by New World Computing in 1990, and blends elements of the original game with a modernized interface and gameplay elements. The game's story sees players taking on the role of a special treasure hunter for a king, who soon becomes embroiled on a quest to save their daughter and prevent their world from being destroyed.

Since its release, the game has received favourable reviews, and received a number of sequels using the same engine. These include King's Bounty: Armored Princess, King's Bounty: Crossworlds, King's Bounty: Warriors of the North, and King's Bounty: Dark Side. A sequel in a new engine, King's Bounty II, was released in August 2021.

== Gameplay ==
In King's Bounty: The Legend, the player plays as a hero in the world of Endoria, sworn to serve the king of Darion. After a brief "final exam" tutorial at the School of Knights, the player receives some basic troops and is then set free to pursue whatever quests are desired. The king provides the main story quests, but there are numerous side quests which can be completed as well, in virtually any order.

The player's character cannot directly fight in battles, but rather employs up to five squadrons of allies to do so. These range from the mundane (e.g., peasants or archers) to creatures from high fantasy (e.g., griffins, beholders or ents), and can vary in size from just a single unit all the way up into the hundreds. Troops are recruited from various locations in the game, with a limit on the maximum size of each unit determined by the character's "Leadership" statistic. In combat, troops are then assisted by the player's character through the use of magic (spells and scrolls), Spirits of Rage and passive bonuses.

While not in combat or visiting a specific location, players move on the overworld map in real-time, although with the ability to pause. Hence, enemy groups shown on the map will move towards the player if close enough, initiating combat if they touch the player's avatar. Otherwise, players are free to move throughout the various game locations while day and night slowly cycle, without any concept of turn-based play. Treasures and other items can be picked up by directing the player's character towards them, and non-hostile characters can be interacted with by similar means, usually to make purchases or as part of a quest.

King's Bounty: The Legend allows players to play as one of three different character classes, from the choices of warrior, paladin, and mage. Each class specializes in one of the three skill trees in the game, although players are allowed to cross-specialize. By allocating runes received as treasure or after gaining a level, players choose which skills to focus on.

=== Resource management ===
The main gameplay challenge in King's Bounty: The Legend is one of finite resource management, with the main resources being gold, troops and magic crystals. If the player does not die, being defeated means a loss of all troops travelling with the player. These can only be replaced by spending significant amounts of gold in order to hire a new army.

Due to the use of randomly generated enemies and treasures, in each location there are often a few powerful enemy groups. To defeat them and clear the location completely, players generally have to travel to other locations, retrieve any readily available gold, experience, and runes there in order to make the character more powerful, then backtrack to the previous location to complete it. This confused some players and reviewers, as the assumption was that gameplay would be more linear and that each location could be readily completed once accessible.

The different character classes will generally handle resource problems in different ways:

- The Warrior, due to his combat abilities, fights effectively with almost any army, minimizing casualties. He also has more freedom in using the Spirits of Rage, especially when casualties are high.
- For a Mage, the type of troops he commands is less relevant, as he relies mainly on his magical power and spells. He can minimize casualties, make any unit more useful, or destroy enemies with magic directly.
- The Paladin excels in Mind skills and thus receives greater quantities of leadership, gold, and experience, and is often able to recruit a small number of units from the enemy ranks. This makes the Paladin less constrained by most resource problems. He can also upgrade priests into inquisitors, who can help reduce casualties.

=== Spirits of Rage ===
The Spirits of Rage are a group of four powerful creatures trapped in the magical "Rage Casket" eons ago by ancient sorcerers. Bound to the chest, they are required to obey its master, carrying out his bidding by briefly manifesting in the physical world to smite enemies. The spirits are not available at the beginning of the game, but instead only become available after a certain central quest has been completed. Additionally, the player has to complete a special quest for each spirit in order to obtain its help, and some of these quests will only become available as the plot progresses.

In terms of game mechanics, the Spirits of Rage are, technically, self-upgrading spells. Each spirit possesses four different abilities (spells), becomes more powerful or less expensive to call upon as it grows more experienced, and receives experience from killing enemies. Each spirit gains experience independently, and each ability is upgraded separately.

Using these abilities depletes the character's rage, which can only be increased in combat, by killing enemy units or by taking casualties. Casualties will generate more rage, thus extensive usage of Spirits of Rage is only possible in difficult battles, where a large number of troops wind up perishing. Between battles rage cannot be stored for long, as it slowly depletes over time until reaching zero.

=== Marriage ===
The player's character can be married, and there are several different marriage opportunities in the game. After this occurs, the character's wife follows him everywhere. A wife provides bonuses to a character's primary stats and/or a combat bonus to some types of units. Additionally, each wife offers four additional slots for equipment and artifacts, allowing the character to use more of them at once. The types of slots for weapons, armor, rings, cloaks, and so on are different for each potential wife.

Lastly, the character and his wife can have children. Each child will permanently occupy one of the wife's slots, but will also provide a bonus. Bonuses are pre-defined for each child, but which children will be born is random. If divorced, a wife will leave with the children, a percentage of the character's gold, and any equipment or artifacts she was wearing.

== Plot ==
The game's story is about Bill Gilbert who applies to work at the royal palace. After passing a few trial tests, he is introduced to the King Mark as Royal Treasure Searcher. From that point, he starts ascending. First, he chases bandits, collects taxes and does simple delivery tasks.

A plot twist occurs once he is tasked to bring a powerful artifact, known as Rage Chest, from the wizards to the King. While transporting the artifact, he cuts himself by it and gets bound with the spirits, thus making him unable to give the chest to the King, instead allowing him to use it for himself.

== Development and release ==
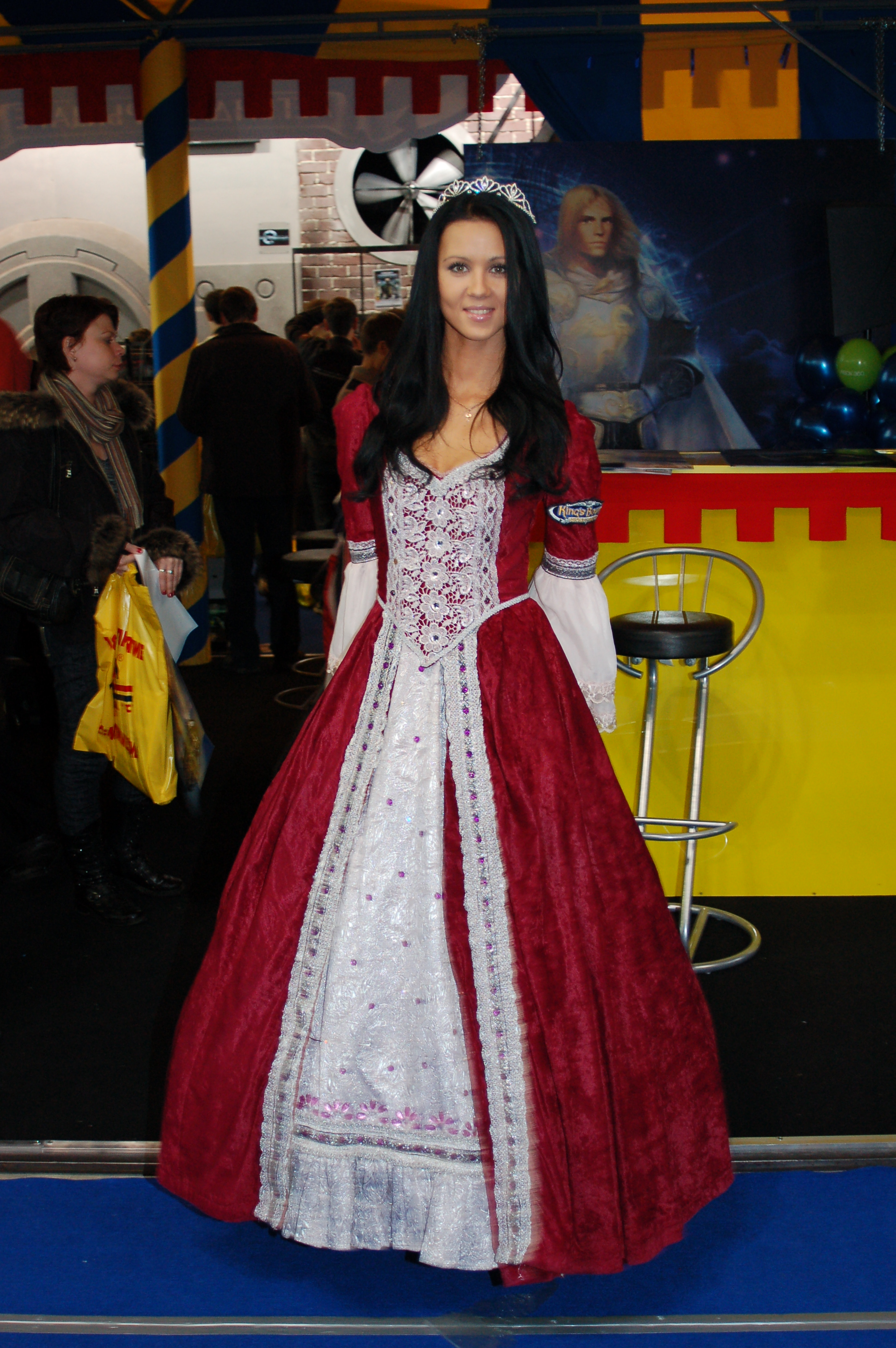
Promotion at IgroMir 2007

In 2007, the Russian game publisher 1C Company purchased the property rights to the King's Bounty franchise and attached the name to a title being developed by Katauri Interactive, a small company located in Kaliningrad. Prior to the name change, the game's working title was Battle Lord.

The game uses a modified version of an engine licensed from another Russian company, SkyFallen Entertainment. This engine supports a number of graphical capabilities and techniques, including dynamic colored lighting, realistic dynamic shadows, skeletal animation, detailed models and textures, pixel shaders 2.0 & 3.0 (with a great number of corresponding effects), normal and parallax mapping, shader materials, bloom, blur and particle effects.

The title features a variety of sound effects and music for the different portions of the game. The musical tracks were written by Moscow composer Mikhail Kostylev, along with Katauri's partner company, TriHorn Productions. One goal of the composers was to try and produce different musical pieces for different in-game locations, with a feeling which matched that of the area's inhabitants.

When asked during an interview how Katauri wound up as the developer for King's Bounty: The Legend, lead designer Dmitri Gusarov of Katauri replied: "Nobody offered us this game to develop. We made the design document for the project that we wanted to create on our own. and showed them to our publisher, 1C Company. They liked the idea of a fantasy adventure in the great tradition of King's Bounty".

The Polish and Russian versions of the game shipped with StarForce copy protection. The copy protection was removed from the Russian version with release of patch 1.6.0. The US and UK versions of the game ship with SecuROM copy protection.

== Reception ==
Reception

Aggregate scores
| Aggregator | Score |
|---|---|
| GameRankings | 81.88% |
| Metacritic | 79/100 |

Review scores
| Publication | Score |
|---|---|
| GameSpy | 4.5 out of 5 |
| GameZone | 8.2 out of 10 |
| IGN | 8.1 out of 10 |

The IGN review of King's Bounty: The Legend praised the combat system, noting its depth and the need for players to stay alert. Highlighted negatives included the ostensible lack of balance in the difficulty of fights, with some foes being impossibly difficult to defeat in an area of otherwise relatively weak opponents. Overall, though, the title garnered a score of 8.1/10, and the review concluded: "While King's Bounty has some issues, there's a lot to like about the game". The GameSpy review highlighted the larger variety of different troops available in the game, which along with the role-playing customization elements, help the game to feel fresh. As with the IGN review, the GameSpy review noted the unusual distribution of difficult enemies in unexpected areas, and further found that the crowded overworld map made picking out important details difficult. Nonetheless, they felt most of these issues were minor, giving the title a 4.5/5 score and an "Editor's Choice" award. Rock, Paper, Shotgun has repeatedly highlighted King's Bounty as one of the best PC games of 2008.

== Legacy ==
A sequel, titled King's Bounty: Armored Princess, features Lizard-based creatures, a continuation of the original storyline, a new playable hero and new bosses. The Russian version was released on April 10, 2009, and English-language version followed on November 20.

An expansion to Armored Princess was released in 2010, King's Bounty: Crossworlds, which requires King's Bounty: Armored Princess to play. King's Bounty: Platinum Edition was also released in 2010 with the three first titles (The Legend, Armored Princess and Crossworlds). A second sequel called King's Bounty: Warriors of the North was released in 2012. A card game based on the series was released in the same year. Another entry in the series, called King's Bounty: Dark Side, was released in August 2014.

A direct sequel to the King's Bounty: The Legend, King's Bounty II, was released in 2021.
