= Kao the Kangaroo =

- Genres: Platformer adventure, action-adventure
- Developers: Tate Multimedia (2003-present); Titus Interactive (2001)
- Publishers: Titus Interactive (2000); JoWooD Productions (2005); Atari (2005-2006); Tate Multimedia (2022)
- Platforms: Dreamcast; GameCube; Game Boy Advance; Microsoft Windows; Nintendo Switch; PlayStation 2; PlayStation 4; PlayStation 5; PlayStation Portable; Xbox; Xbox One; Xbox Series X/S
- First release: Kao the Kangaroo; November 23, 2000
- Latest release: Kao the Kangaroo; May 27, 2022

Kao the Kangaroo (Polish: Kangurek Kao) is a series of platform video games developed and published by Polish studio Tate Multimedia.

Each game follows the adventures of the protagonist and titular character, Kao, a young Australian kangaroo fitted with a pair of boxing gloves. Throughout each game, Kao has to travel through several different environments in 3D platform games with exploration, adventure, and mysteries.

== Main series ==
Release timeline
2000	Kao the Kangaroo
2001	Kao the Kangaroo (GBA)
2002
2003	Kao the Kangaroo: Round 2
2004
2005	Kao Challengers
2005	Kao the Kangaroo: Mystery of the Volcano
2006	Kao the Kangaroo Trilogy
2007–2021
2022	Kao the Kangaroo

=== Kao the Kangaroo (2000) ===
The first installment was published by Titus Interactive for Microsoft Windows and SEGA Dreamcast on November 23, 2000. Kao and his family are suddenly captured by the Hunter, so when Kao is able to make his escape, he sets out to rescue his family and return to Australia.

=== Kao the Kangaroo: Round 2 (2003) ===
Kao the Kangaroo: Round 2 is the sequel to Kao the Kangaroo, released on November 4, 2003, for Windows and on April 15, 2004, for Xbox, PlayStation 2, and GameCube. Kao escapes capture by the Hunter (returning from the first game) and sets out to release all of his friends from captivity.

=== Kao the Kangaroo: Mystery of the Volcano (2005) ===
Kao: Mystery of the Volcano (sometimes written as "Mystery of Volcano") is the sequel to Kao the Kangaroo: Round 2 and the third mainline game in the Kao the Kangaroo series. The game was released exclusively for Windows on December 2, 2005. Crashed on a volcanic island, Kao explores the volcano with five companions to rescue his friend, and he learns new skills along the way.

=== Kao the Kangaroo (2022) ===
Kao the Kangaroo (not to be confused with the original 2000 game or the GBA title) was released on May 27, 2022. Returning after a 16-year hiatus, Kao has to fight his way through enemies called "fighting masters" in search of his missing sister. The game was meant to keep the spirit of the original games, but have a more modern look.

== Spin-offs ==
=== Kao the Kangaroo (GBA) (2001) ===
Kao the Kangaroo is a 2D side scrolling game developed and released by Titus Interactive in December 2001 for the Game Boy Advance. Unlike the Microsoft Windows and SEGA Dreamcast game also called Kao the Kangaroo, Kao on GBA is a 2D side-scrolling platform game with twenty-seven levels. The GBA game does keep the same plot as the Windows and Dreamcast versions, even though the level design and controls are completely different.

=== Kao Challengers (2005) ===
Kao Challengers is an updated version of Kao the Kangaroo: Round 2 developed by Tate Interactive and published by Atari exclusively for the PlayStation Portable in October 2005 in Europe and March 2006 in North America. The game introduces a new world with four additional levels for the single-player mode and 2 new multiplayer modes.

=== Kao the Kangaroo Trilogy (2006) ===
A compilation of the first three mainline games of the series called The World of Kao the Kangaroo (Note: Polish: Świat Kangurka Kao) was released for Windows on November 17, 2006.
