= Tate Multimedia =

Polish video game publisher

Tate Multimedia S.A.
- Type: Private
- Industry: Video games
- Headquarters: Warsaw, Poland
- Key people: Jerzy Tadeusz Leskowicz; Paul Aleksander Leskowicz
- Products: Kao the Kangaroo; Urban Trial Freestyle
- Website: tatemultimedia.com

Tate Multimedia S.A. is a Polish video game publisher who has released games for consoles, handheld consoles and Windows. The company merged with Tate Interactive (formerly X-Ray Interactive) in 2015.

As of July 2022, Tate has transitioned from being a developer/publisher to a full-time publisher. As of 2024, Tate Multimedia laid off most of its staff after a string of commercial failures.

== Notable games ==
Year	Title	System(s)	Publisher(s)
2000	Kao the Kangaroo	Dreamcast, PC	Titus Interactive
2003	Penguin Kelvin	PC	Play Publishing (PLAY Sp. z o.o.)
2003	Kao the Kangaroo: Round 2	Xbox, GameCube, PS2, PC	JoWooD Productions, Atari
2005	Kao Challengers	PSP	Atari
2005	Kao the Kangaroo: Mystery of the Volcano	PC	n3vrf41l Publishing (Australia) / 1C Company (Russia)
2007	Asterix & Obelix XXL 2 - Mission: Wifix	PSP	Atari Europe
2007	Lanfeust of Troy	PSP	Atari Europe
2007	Go West! A Lucky Luke Adventure	DS, PC, Wii	Atari Europe
2008	My Horse & Me 2	DS, PC, PS2, Wii, Xbox 360	Atari Europe
2010	The Saddle Club	PC, Wii	Deep Silver
2011	Titeuf le Film	PC, Wii, DS	Deep Silver
2013	Urban Trial Freestyle	PC, PS3, PS Vita, Nintendo 3DS, iOS	Tate Interactive
2017	Urban Trial Freestyle 2	Nintendo 3DS	Tate Interactive
2018	Urban Trial Playground	Nintendo Switch, PC	Tate Interactive
2018	Steel Rats	PC, Linux, Mac, Xbox One, PS4	Tate Interactive
2022	Kao the Kangaroo	PC, Xbox One, Xbox Series X/S, PS4, PS5, Nintendo Switch	Tate Multimedia
