= Kaze no Uta =

2002 video game

- Promotional poster for the Dreamcast release.
- Developer(s): Milk Soft
- Publisher(s): Milk Soft
- Platform(s): PC, Dreamcast, DVD player
- Release: Windows: JP: August 23, 2002; Dreamcast: JP: April 15, 2004; DVD player: JP: November 17, 2005
- Genre(s): Visual novel, Eroge
- Mode(s): Single player

Kaze no Uta (風ノ唄, Song of the Wind)^{[I]} is an eroge visual novel developed by Milk Soft for Windows. The Sega Dreamcast version removes the pornographic elements, but features new CG scenes, added content, and a bonus drama CD.

== Notes ==
I : The choice of kanji here implies a subtle distinction, as there are at least three kanji for the word uta: 歌, 唄, and 詩. While all three mean 'song', they have their own connotations. The use of the 唄 kanji implies a song that includes a shamisen.
