= King's Bounty: Crossworlds =

- Developer: Katauri Interactive
- Publisher: 1C Company
- Series: King's Bounty
- Platform: Windows
- Release: 17 September 2010
- Genre: Tactical role-playing
- Mode: Single-player

King's Bounty: Crossworlds (Russian: King's Bounty: Перекрёстки миров) is an expansion pack for the tactical role-playing game King's Bounty: Armored Princess.

It includes the Orcs on the March expansion (which is the expanded version of Armored Princess campaign, totally rebalanced with orcs), two new independent campaigns, and an editor with help system. The editor allows the user to create additional content for the game and alter it in any way.

== Development ==
The development of the expansion pack was revealed in May 2010 by 1C Company and Katauri Interactive. New additions in the expansion pack include two new campaigns Champion of the Arena and Defender of the Crown, Orcs on the March expansion for King's Bounty: Armored Princess, new quests, items, spells and creatures. A game-editor allows players to create mods for King's Bounty' Armored Princess with the help of the tool. The game was released on September 17 of the same year, and was released in three different editions. The standard version contains the new content of King's Bounty: Crossworlds and requires an installed version of King's Bounty: Armored Princess. The Game of the Year Edition contained both King's Bounty: Armored Princess as well as King's Bounty: Crossworlds. King's Bounty: Platinum Edition contains King's Bounty' Armored Princess and King's Bounty: Crossworlds, along with King's Bounty: The Legend.

== Reception ==
Reception

Aggregate scores
Aggregator	Score
GameRankings	75.7%
Metacritic	78/100

Review scores
Publication	Score
GameSpot	8/10
GameZone	7/10
PC Gamer (UK)	78/100

The game holds a score of 78/100 on Metacritic and an aggregate of 75.7% on GameRankings. King's Bounty: Crossworlds received an 8/10 from Brett Todd of GameSpot, who said that the "combat is still no walk in the park", and although felt to be similar from its predecessors, he was ultimately positive to the game. Mike Splechta of GameZone awarded it a score of 7/10. Jazz McDougall of PC Gamer gave it a score of 78/100, calling its campaigns less interesting than the King's Bounty: Armored Princess.
