= Kango Shicyauzo =

- Cover art of North American release.
- Developer(s): Trabulance
- Publisher(s): JP: Trabulance; NA: G-Collections
- Producer(s): Sabamiso-tei
- Designer(s): Heihei Heihei
- Programmer(s): Chabin
- Artist(s): Naotaka Shimizu
- Writer(s): Soemon Nekoya
- Composer(s): Tetsu Tsukamoto
- Series: Kango Shicyauzo
- Platform(s): Microsoft Windows; DVD TV game
- Release: JP: March 2, 2001; NA: June 24, 2003
- Genre(s): Visual novel, eroge
- Mode(s): Single player

Kango Shicyauzo (看護しちゃうぞ Kango Shichauzo) is a Japanese erotic visual novel developed and published by Trabulance, released on March 2, 2001 for Windows. Kango Shicyauzo was released by Trabulance as a DVD TV game on July 25, 2002, entitled Kango Shichauzo Nanana Triangle. Another DVDPG edition was released on September 26, 2002, this time entitled Kango Shichauzo Maioka Wonderful. It was localized in North America as I'm Gonna Nurse You by G-Collections. The English version was released on June 24, 2003. Since its second revision, both current Japanese and English versions have "Voice Plus!" as an additional subtitle to denote the inclusion of original voice actresses recordings for characters in the game.

The game also has two erotic sequels, one being Kango Shichauzo 2 ~Joshi Ryou wa Moeteiru ka~, which was released in Japan for the PC on April 19, 2002, and released as a DVD TV game on November 27, 2003 by Trabulance. Like the first game, it was also localized in North America by G-Collections, on June 24, 2003. Lastly, the third game entitled Kango Shichauzo 3 ~Kangofu-san wa Amaenbo~ was only released in Japan for the PC on July 16, 2004.

== Plot ==
Shinobu Nakagawa is a newly licensed pediatrician employed at the fictional St. Michael's General Hospital in Tokyo, Japan. One evening during work, he receives a telephone call from his foster mother, Kaede Maioka, requesting his company at her house. Though personally bothered at this inconvenience, he reluctantly agrees to visit.

Upon his arrival, Shinobu receives the proposition to fill-in for a sick professor at the Saint Michael's Nursing School; an all-girls institution near the hospital. The offer is met with negative reception until Shinobu realizes his efforts upset Kaede, leading him to sympathetically accept. It is shortly after this that Shinobu learns his foster stepsister, Momiji Maioka, is also an enrolled student to the same school.

The following morning he visits the school for orientation and is introduced to three affectionate young girls who happily befriend him. While each one, including Shinobu's own foster family, harbor amorous feelings for him, only through careful judgment will one particular woman outstand the rest and win his heart.

== Gameplay ==
Kango Shicyauzo is played like a traditional visual novel; the player advances through scenes with character dialog, and making decisions based on scripted dilemmas which occur. Gameplay selections branch to different plotlines, usually leading to Shinobu monogamously dating, sexually engaging, and marrying one of the primary female cast members. If however, the player fails to establish a relationship, Shinobu will be called back to mandatorily work at the hospital; thus, ending the game early. An exclusive plotline, known as the Harem Route or Playboy Route, becomes available when the player completes each of the female's individual storylines. Through this special path, Shinobu will be engage in polyamorous group sex with the female characters, instead of gradually developing a relationship with just one of them.

Game progress can be saved by the player at any time, and a prompt to remind a player to save at important points can be enabled. Hints can be set to give the player an additional choice at decisions to directly or indirectly show what outcome a choice may lead to.

== Characters ==
Shinobu Nakagawa (中川 忍 • しのぶ なかがわ, Nakagawa Shinobu)
A recently finished postdoctoral researcher, Shinobu Nakagawa is a physician whose main focus of practice is pediatrics. His initial idea of becoming a temporary instructor at a woman's nursing school greatly distresses him, but over time he acclimates with his new environment and becomes quite fond of it. As a handsome bachelor, he receives constant admiration from the student body, especially his closest peers, who all desire to be his girlfriend. Although he can be somewhat stubborn and tactless, Shinobu is in fact a benevolent young man who wishes to see his newly assigned students succeed.

Kaede Maioka (舞岡 楓 • まいおか かえで, Maioka Kaede)
Voluptuous and enticing, Kaede Maioka is a Clinical Nurse Specialist who volunteers at the Saint Michael's General Hospital and officially works as an instructor at the school. She is Shinobu's foster mother, whose profession in health care led to both his and Momiji's interest in the field. While Kaede is proficient when it comes to her work, she often desires lecherous activity outside her medical duty at the most inappropriate of times, usually having Shinobu participate with her. Despite this, Kaede is a caring woman, who enjoys seeing her friends and patients happy. Age unknown.

Voiced by: Reika Maki

Momiji Maioka (舞岡 紅葉 • まいおか もみじ, Maioka Momiji)
Momiji Maioka is Kaede's only biological daughter and Shinobu's foster stepsister. Her personality is effervescent in nature, usually to other's chagrin, but she can and does become serious when necessary. Since childhood Momiji has stayed close to Shinobu as a friendly companion, and now as a mature adolescent, her feelings have developed into a passionate attraction to him. Fueled by ambitious determination, Momiji strives to achieve the same level of nursing expertise as her mother, and ultimately work alongside Shinobu at the hospital. Age 18.

Voiced by: Milk Uchimura

Nanana Yoshino (吉野 奈々菜 • よしの ななな, Yoshino Nanana)
Another enrolled student, Nanana Yoshino is Momiji's best friend. She is incredibly dainty, optimistic, shy and clumsy; usually to her own humiliation. Her attraction to Shinobu is deep, and the desire to express appreciation for his kindness is what unfortunately generates conflict within her friendship with Momiji. Having been hospitalized as a child and recuperated by a nurse, Nanana wishes to also excel in health care and, like Momiji, work alongside Shinobu. Age 18.

Voiced by: Aya Serizawa

Emi Katakura (片倉 詠美 • かたくら えいみ, Katakura Eimi)
Emi Katakura is a Roman Catholic nun who, like Kaede Maioka, volunteers at the Saint Michael's General Hospital, works as an instructor at the school, and additionally performs religious services at the nearby Catholic Church. Gentle and slow, Emi does her best to soothe the mental health of patients and educate students in the field of medicine. Her interpretation of God's will, and the messages she claims to receive from him through prayer, however, are somewhat unorthodox, and vaguely excuse her from breaking celibacy; especially when she becomes intimate with Shinobu. Age unknown.

Voiced by: Honoka Kasuga

Chisa Mutsuki (睦月 知沙 • むつき ちさ, Mutsuki Chisa)
Gentle, focused, and intelligent, Chisa Mutsuki is the elected Class President for the student body of the Saint Michael's Nursing School. Her dedication to her studies is unusually obsessive, and as a direct result, lacks an ordinary social life and the ability to make or retain friendships. She takes a passionate interest in Shinobu for his concern of her solitary behavior, and follows his advice to become more outgoing. With parents who manage their own hospital, Chisa desires to train herself to a professional degree in nursing and, unsurprisingly, assist Shinobu in his hospital of choice. Age 18.

Voiced by: Mizuho Yuuki

== Music ==
- Opening and Closing theme song: NURSING SAMBA ～灼熱の時間とき～ (NURSING SAMBA~ Shakunetsu no Jikan Toki~)

Arrangement by Tasogare no Yume
Lyrics by Takeshi Yokoyama
Vocals by Noriko Saito

The shortened version of this song is available to freely listen to here

== Development ==
=== Patches ===
On March 21, 2006 G-Collections released a software patch for owners of the first original release of Kango Shicyauzo, as explicit renders had been censored. The patch removes these censors.

== Reception ==
Kango Shicyauzo was met with generally positive reception. The first game localized by G-Collections, and arguably its best-selling title, Japan based distributor JList called it a "landmark for English bishoujo games." Less than acclaimed aspects of the game generally included a lack of plot, low-resolution graphics and predictable endings.
