= King's Bounty: Armored Princess =

2009 video game

- Developer: Katauri Interactive
- Publisher: 1C Company
- Series: King's Bounty
- Platforms: Cloud (OnLive); Microsoft Windows; Mac OS X
- Release: Windows: RU: April 10, 2009; NA: November 20, 2009; UK: March 19, 2010; Mac OS X: WW: April 5, 2012
- Genre: Tactical role-playing
- Mode: Single-player

King's Bounty: Armored Princess (Russian: King's Bounty: Принцесса в доспехах) is a strategy video game developed for Microsoft Windows by Katauri Interactive and published in most regions by 1C Company in 2009. It is the sequel to the strategy game King's Bounty: The Legend, which is itself based on concepts from the much older King's Bounty developed years earlier by New World Computing. While the mechanics of the game do not differ significantly from that of the previous year's release, it features a new heroine and other minor new elements. Its expansion pack King's Bounty: Crossworlds was released in 2010.

== Plot ==
King's Bounty: Armored Princess begins 10 years after the previous title, King's Bounty: The Legend, with the world of Darion being almost completely overrun by hordes of demons. In a last-ditch effort to obtain assistance for a besieged kingdom, a powerful spell is cast which opens a portal to another world, the world of Teana. Playing as Princess Amelie, the player ventures through this portal in search of the legendary knight Sir Bill Gilbert. Upon arriving in this alternate world, Bill Gilbert is nowhere to be found, but the inhabitants provide a number of their own quests, including a search for eight magical stones with the powers of the gods.

== Gameplay ==
Armored Princess maintains many of the same game conventions used in The Legend. The player again chooses from one of three different classes (warrior, paladin or mage) and recruits up to five different squadrons of troops at any given time in order to fight battles. Troops are recruited from various locations in the game, with a limit on the maximum size of each unit determined by the character's "Leadership" statistic. In combat, troops are then assisted by the player's character through the use of magic, passive bonuses, and a new element, Amelie's pet baby dragon.

The world map is broken up into a number of different islands which can be navigated between via ship. Each island generally has troops of certain types and foes of a certain level range, giving each island a distinctive identity. The player can only travel to islands for which the player has discovered a map, and this mechanic is used to slowly provide additional islands for the player to visit while revisiting the previous islands. At some point during play, the player's mount gains the ability to fly, making dodging enemies and traversing each island easier.

Upon first reaching the world of Teana, Princess Amelie obtains a pet baby dragon. The player chooses the dragon's color and base abilities, and it then travels with the princess for the remainder of the game. During combat, the dragon can be summoned to attack foes or otherwise influence the battle using the player's accumulated rage. This mechanic replaces the Spirits of Rage from the previous title, and like the Spirits, the dragon cannot be attacked or harmed by enemies. After each use of an ability, the baby dragon must sleep for at least one turn, possibly longer, before the player can call on it again.

In addition, the player can choose from among several companions met over the course of the game to travel with. A companion can carry additional pieces of equipment (providing additional bonuses), and each companion has a unique ability. Companions take the place of wives from The Legend, although they act in much the same way.

== Release ==
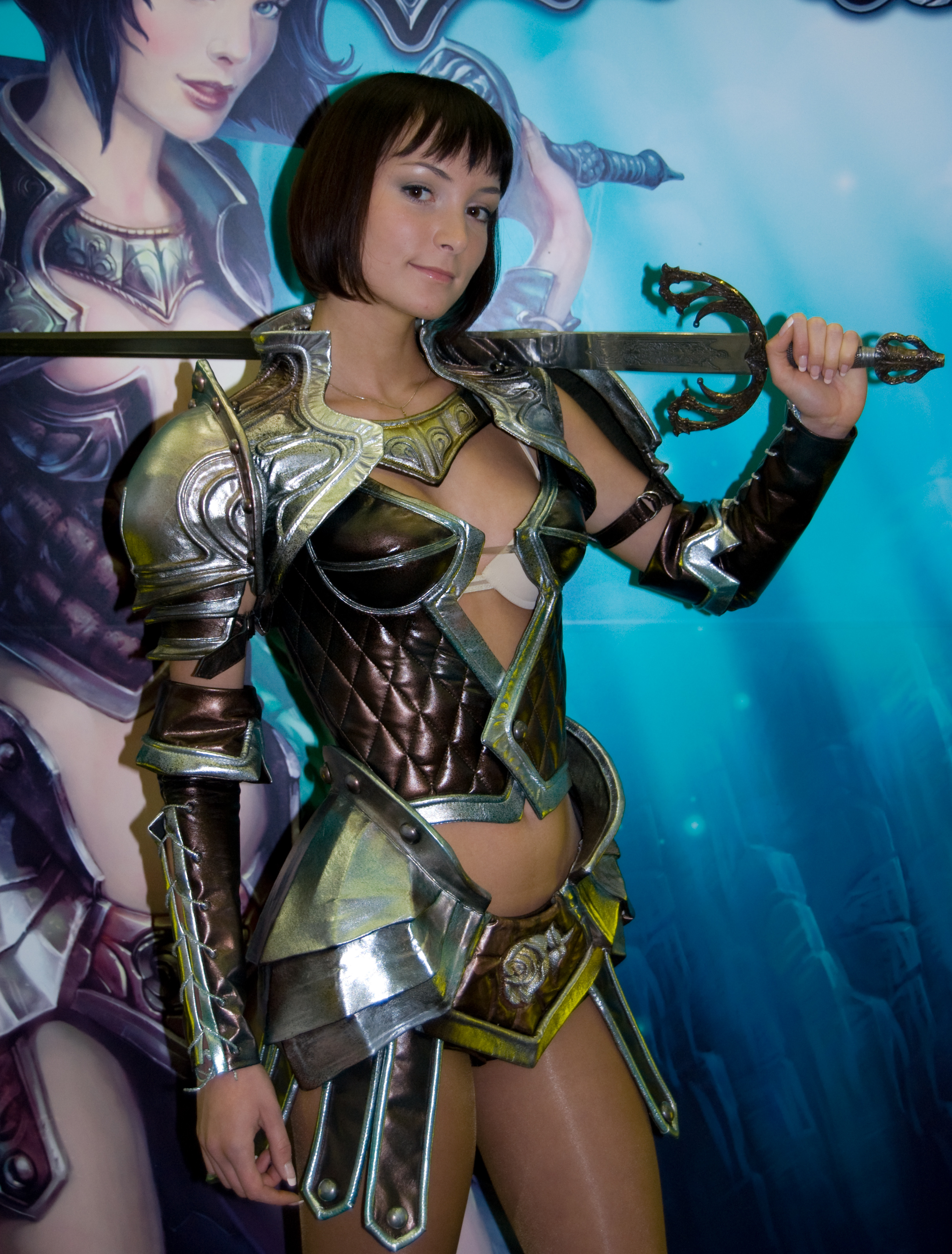
Promotion at IgroMir 2008

The title was first announced in November 2008, with the first release being the Russian version on April 10, 2009. The Polish version was released on October 23, while the North American version was released on November 20. Serving as an alternate publisher, Focus Multimedia published the title in the UK on March 19, 2010. DTP Entertainment published in April 2010 the German-language edition of Armored Princess. An expansion pack, King's Bounty: Crossworlds, was released in 2010, with a rebalanced and extended campaign, as well as two new campaigns, and an editor to create additional content.

== Reception ==
Reception

Aggregate scores
Aggregator	Score
GameRankings	80.83%
Metacritic	82/100

Review scores
Publication	Score
Eurogamer	8/10
Game Informer	8.75/10
GameSpot	8/10
RPGamer	3/5
GameStar	83/100
Multiplayer.it	8.2/10

The game holds a score of 83/100 on Metacritic and an aggregate score of 80.83% on GameRankings. The game was awarded a review score of 8/10 by Alec Meer of Eurogamer. Brett Todd of GameSpot also awarded it the same score, praising its gameplay and characters while criticising its visual and sound quality. Adam Beissener of Game Informer gave it a review score of 8.75/10, comparing its gameplay to the classic title of Heroes of Might and Magic. Anna Marie Neufeld gave it a score of 3/5, praising its strategic gameplay while criticising it for its hard difficulty.
