= Kao the Kangaroo: Round 2 =

2003 video game

- PAL region cover art for PlayStation 2
- Developer: Tate Interactive
- Publishers: POL: Cenega; PAL: JoWooD Productions; NA: Atari
- Series: Kao the Kangaroo
- Platforms: Windows; GameCube; PlayStation 2 Xbox
- Release: POL: November 4, 2003 (Win); PAL: April 15, 2005; NA: March 21, 2006
- Genres: Action-adventure, platform
- Mode: Single-player

Kao the Kangaroo: Round 2 (Polish: Kangurek Kao: Runda 2) is an action-adventure video game developed by Tate Interactive, and a sequel to Kao the Kangaroo. It was originally released on the PC in Poland in November 2003 by Cenega, and was later released in other European territories on PC and consoles in 2005 by JoWooD Productions, and in the US in 2006 by Atari.

A remake titled Kao Challengers was released for the PlayStation Portable in 2005/2006 and a new title called Kao: Mystery of the Volcano was released for the PC in 2005.

Kao the Kangaroo Round 2 was released to Steam on June 1, 2019, being free for users to add to their libraries for 24 hours. The game alongside the other two games in the series were added to GOG.com in February 2021.

== Plot ==
The wicked hunter from the first game returns and captures Kao and all of his friends in order to take revenge. However, Kao escapes from his ship and must find a way to defeat the hunter and his allies to save his friends.

== Reception ==
Reception

Aggregate scores
Aggregator	Score
GameRankings	NGC: 57% PS2: 61%
Metacritic	XBOX: 62/100; NGC: 57/100; PS2: 58/100

Review scores
Publication	Score
GameSpot	6.1/10
GameTrailers	6.1/10
GameZone	7.5/10
IGN	5.5/10
NGC Magazine	59%
Nintendo Power	2.5/10
Play	54%

Reviews of the game were mixed. GameRankings and Metacritic gave it a score of 62 out of 100 for the Xbox version, 57% and 57 out of 100 for the GameCube version, and 61% and 58 out of 100 for the PlayStation 2 version.
