= Kao the Kangaroo (2022 video game) =

- Developer: Tate Multimedia
- Publisher: Tate Multimedia
- Producer: Józef Debecki
- Designers: Joao Respeito; Bartosz Maciejewski; Piotr Gryko
- Programmers: Piotr Gryko; Paweł Rendaszka
- Artists: Kornelia Błażyńska; Monika Jaworska
- Composer: Patryk Scelina
- Series: Kao the Kangaroo
- Engine: Unreal Engine 4
- Platforms: Nintendo Switch; PlayStation 4; PlayStation 5; Windows; Xbox One; Xbox Series X/S
- Release: May 27, 2022
- Genre: Platform
- Mode: Single-player

Kao the Kangaroo (Polish: Kangurek Kao) is a platform game developed and published by Tate Multimedia. It was released in May 2022 for Nintendo Switch, PlayStation 4, PlayStation 5, Windows, Xbox One and Xbox Series X/S. It is the fourth installment of the franchise, a reboot of the Kao the Kangaroo series, and the first title released after Kao the Kangaroo: Mystery of the Volcano in 2005.

== Gameplay ==
Kao the Kangaroo is a third-person 3D action platformer where players control Kao as he moves and jumps across obstacles and suspended platforms in a variety of environments. He is able to attack enemies using his boxing gloves as well as explore hidden areas for collectibles.

== Story ==
Set in a world of anthropomorphic animals, a kangaroo fighter named Kao sets off on a journey to search for his missing sister, Kaia, and discover the secret of his long-lost father, Koby. To do this, he must battle the famous "fighting masters" who are being influenced by a dark power, and ultimately face the powerful Eternal Warrior who threatens the balance of the world.

== Development ==
Kao the Kangaroo is developed and published by Polish studio Tate Multimedia who previously created every other title in the Kao series. The game was announced in June 2020, which marked the 20th anniversary of the series, with the first concept art and information surfacing the following September. Development started shortly after the series' second game, Kao the Kangaroo: Round 2, was re-released on Steam in 2019 following a trending #BringKaoBack campaign on social media. Tate Multimedia was surprised by the games sales on the platform, which lead them to decide to create a new installment. The team prototyped a number of ideas, including a remake of the third game in the series, Mystery of the Volcano, and a combat-focused game starring a much older Kao. Eventually, the team decided to make the project a reboot, with Tate Multimedia publishing head Kaja Borówko saying that it is a completely different take on the story and on the character. The announcement was followed by a short gameplay clip showing early footage Kao in a jungle environment. Tate Multimedia developed Kao using Unreal Engine 4. Although the game was originally intended to be released in 2021, the developers later pushed the release to 2022. The game launched for Nintendo Switch, PlayStation 4, PlayStation 5, Windows, Xbox One, and Xbox Series X/S on May 27, 2022.

On October 13, 2022, a paid expansion named Oh! Well was released as downloadable content (DLC) for all platforms. It features five new levels as well as five unlockable costumes for Kao. On May 4, 2023, the second DLC Bend the Roo’les was released, adding a new campaign and boss fight.

== Reception ==
Reception

Aggregate scores
Aggregator	Score
Metacritic	NS: 65/100; PC: 69/100; PS5: 63/100; XONE: 70/100; XSXS: 69/100
OpenCritic	44% recommend

Review scores
Publication	Score
Destructoid	7/10
Game Informer	6/10
Gamezebo	2.5/5
Hardcore Gamer	3/5
IGN	7/10
Nintendo Life	7/10
Nintendo World Report	7/10
Push Square	6/10
Shacknews	6/10
Pure Xbox	7/10

Kao the Kangaroo received "mixed or average" reviews, according to review aggregator Metacritic. Fellow review aggregator OpenCritic assessed that the game received fair approval, being recommended by 44% of critics.

Destructoid gave the title a 7 out of 10 and praised its scope, character designs, art style, controls, level design, and stage backgrounds, while taking minor issue with its story and voice acting. Game Informer lamented the game's difficulty, overworld design, abilities, and technical issues while comparing it unfavorably to the Mario, Crash Bandicoot, and Ratchet & Clank franchises. Hardcore Gamer felt that the level design was "easily the biggest highlight" but similarly cited the game's voice acting, soundtrack, and bugs as its major flaws. IGN gave the game a 7 out of 10, saying that Kao the Kangaroo doesn't try too hard to be gimmicky, packing a colourful aesthetic and light-hearted humor to carry it through the parts where it feels unoriginal. Nintendo Life appreciated the level designs, combat, collectibles, and characters, but stated that the game's camera and performance were subpar. Push Square found the game to be a decent 3D platformer with fun glove powers, enjoyably simple design, and nice music and visuals, but thought the presentation was sloppy with glitches, occasionally awkward gameplay, poor writing, and inadequate voice acting. Shacknews was fond of Kao the Kangaroo's character designs, visuals, sense of humor, and glove-incorporating combat, but criticized the pop-in, performance issues, buggy gameplay, voice acting, in-game camera, and visual design. Pure Xbox found the game to be better than expected, with fun platforming and enjoyable combat, but thought that it felt low-budget on the whole, clunky, and frustrating at times.
