= King's Bounty: Warriors of the North =

2012 video game

- Front cover of the retail box of the game
- Developer: 1C-Softclub
- Publisher: 1C Company
- Series: King's Bounty
- Engine: TheEngine
- Platform: Microsoft Windows
- Release: WW: October 26, 2012
- Genre: Tactical role-playing
- Mode: Single-player

King's Bounty: Warriors of the North (Russian: King's Bounty: Воин Севера) is a 2012 strategy video game developed for Microsoft Windows by 1C-Softclub and published by 1C Company as a follow-up to King's Bounty: The Legend.

== Plot ==
The game takes place in the same setting as King's Bounty: the Legend and is a follow-up to it. A generation has passed since the events of King's Bounty: The Legend. The protagonist is Olaf, a Viking who is the youngest son of Tormund the Fierce. The story has Olaf protect and liberate the lands of Endoria from the attacks of the undead army and liberate the land of Nordig from their threat in which along with his army and with the help of five Valkyries.

== Gameplay ==
King's Bounty: Warriors of the North maintains many of the same game conventions used in previous installments. The game is a strategy with RPG elements. The protagonist is Olaf the Viking. In the beginning, the player controls an army consisting of five legions and an access to an overworld map to move around. Sometimes they will stumble onto buried treasures, other times the loot will be out in the open and can find huts or villages where they can buy and sell items or units.

Upon engaging an enemy, the game switches to turn-based battle mode where the player's and enemy forces are displayed on a hex-tiled board with both armies at the opposite ends. Each unit has a specific number of health points which when completely deleted, the entire unit is destroyed. The turn of the units take place in fixed cycles and the player can choose whether to defend, move, attack or use the special abilities of their characters. New to warriors of the north is with proper skills or equipment, troops can expend runes that they are given to briefly increase offensive power, defensive strength, or grant a chance to attack again.

Defeating an enemy force gains money and experience which can be used to make a more powerful army. The game also has a skill tree used to enhance their abilities. Along with magical abilities, the game also features rage abilities. Like magic, these abilities can be used to summon creatures and damage enemies but it only accumulates when a player is hit by an enemy or hits an enemy and dissipates between battles.

The game includes a new race (Vikings), a new school of magic called Rune Magic, and new units like Berserker and Skald. In addition Olaf is also assisted by his companions the five Valkyries and each of them has a unique ability and each will give various bonuses to Olaf's specific stats. Although Olaf travels along with all five female-fighters, he will need to choose one of them to become the main Valkyrie, and her bonus will be 100 percent active unlike the other four with just 25 percent of their powers. The female warriors will gain experience which will improve their combat abilities. In order to upgrade the level of a Valkyrie, the player can sacrifice unneeded equipment, which in turn yields more bonuses to the stats of a character, but a special quest for each of them is the only way to reach the level cap of a Valkyrie.

== Development and release ==
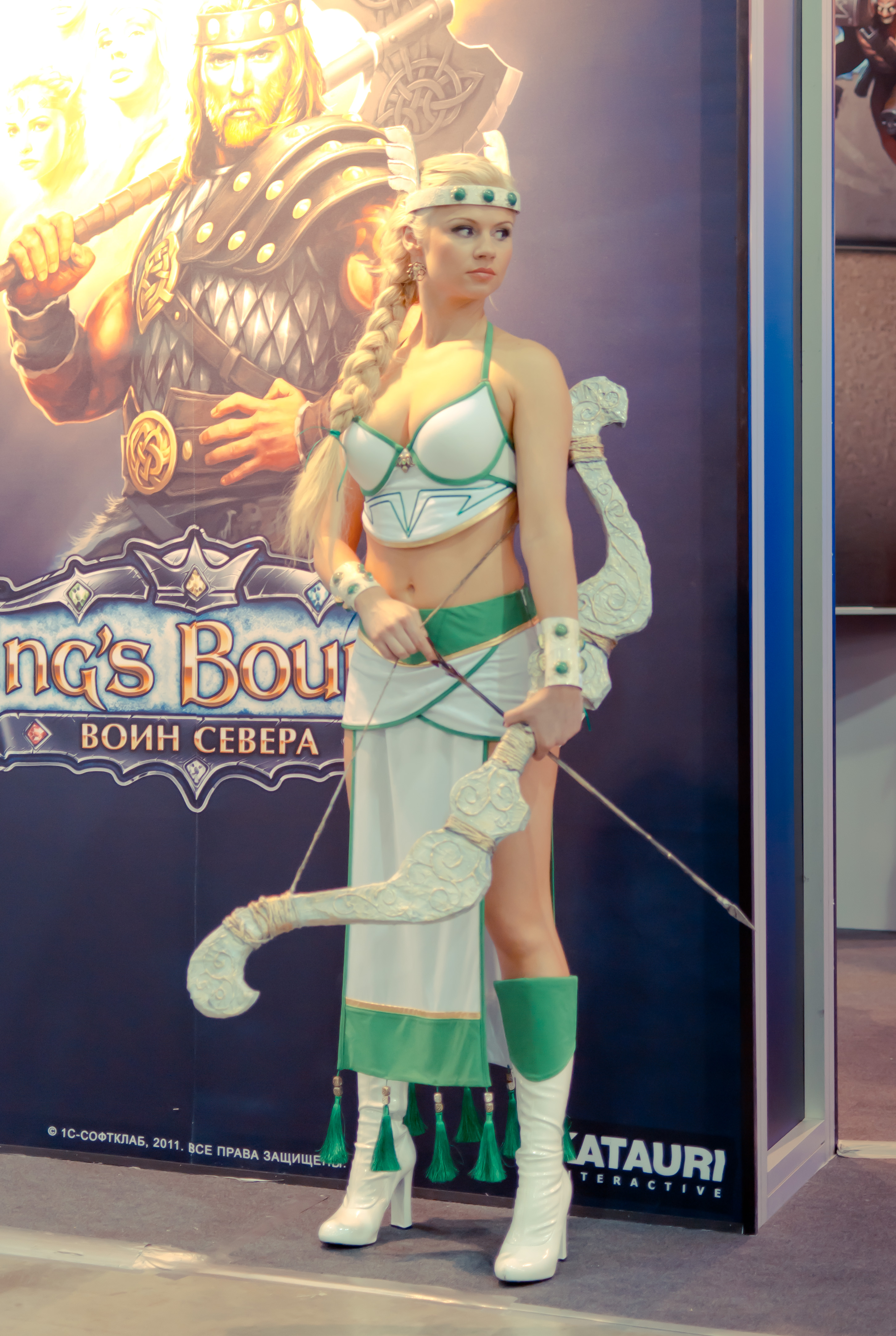
Promotion at IgroMir 2011

Warriors of the North was revealed to be in development since 2011 as the next game in the King's Bounty series. The game was shown in pre-alpha state to the press in February 2012 and was revealed to be a follow-up to the game King's Bounty: The Legend. 1C Company, along with GamesBeat, published the first part of the dev diaries in March that revealed aspects about development of the game. The game was released on October 26, 2012.

A special edition titled Valhalla Edition was also released that contained the Valhalla armor set. A DLC for the game titled King's Bounty: Warriors of the North - Ice and Fire was made available on January 30, 2014 on Steam service. It takes place on a small snow-covered island ruled by Snow Elves and includes a creature skill system which makes the player's troops stronger as they lead them through battles, new type of undead called Necrolizards, new locations and creatures, revamped creatures from the main game and new items with unique attributes.

== Reception ==
Reception

Aggregate scores
| Aggregator | Score |
|---|---|
| GameRankings | 73.92% |
| Metacritic | 73/100 |

Review scores
| Publication | Score |
|---|---|
| GamingXP | 86% |
| Gry-Online | 7.5/10 |
| VentureBeat | 70/100 |

The game holds an aggregate of 73.92% on GameRankings and a score of 74/100 on Metacritic. Dave Vader of GamingXP gave the game a review score of 86%, praising its gameplay and Viking setting. Krystian Smoszna of Gry-Online called it "a robust extension of the well-known and popular formula [of King's Bounty]". Sebastian Haley of GamesBeat gave it a review score of 80/100 but criticised that the game didn't offer anything new over the previous installments.
