= Kao the Kangaroo: Mystery of the Volcano =

2005 video game

- Australian cover art
- Developer: Tate Interactive
- Publishers: POL: Cenega; RUS: 1C Company; AU: N3V Games
- Series: Kao the Kangaroo
- Platform: Windows
- Release: POL: December 2, 2005; RUS: December 15, 2006; AU: June 21, 2007
- Genre: Platform
- Mode: Single-player

Kao the Kangaroo: Mystery of the Volcano (Note: Polish: Kangurek Kao: Tajemnica Wulkanu) also known as Kao 3 is a 2005 platform game developed by Tate Interactive and published by Cenega. It is the third main installment and the fifth overall in the Kao the Kangaroo video game series.

== Gameplay and plot ==
Kao the Kangaroo: Mystery of the Volcano is a 3D platform game where the player assumes in the role of a kangaroo, Kao. It takes place on an archipelago where the player must to collect four artifacts to overcome evil forces manifesting from a nearby volcano, in order to get inside; defeat the God of the Volcano; and free his friend.

== Development and release ==
Kao the Kangaroo: Mystery of the Volcano was developed by Tate Interactive. Paul Leskowicz served as producer and Jan Matląg as a lead programmer along with Jakub Kojder, Marcin Klimek, Marcin Wasniowski and Michał Trzeciak, whilst game designer, Wojciech Biliński also served as the respective 3D modeller, and character animator, alongwith Arkadiusz Firlit. Paweł Czapla provided textures and concepts for the game's world and characters. Piotr Kolasinski, as a special effects artist, was also involved in level design along with Michał Firek, Łukasz Biegun and Jacek Cetera. Sound effects and music by Dariusz Puk and Jakub Kojder, while Jacek Joniec and Jan Nosal voiced characters.

The game was announced on October 31, 2005, and released by Cenega, in Poland on December 2. It was later published in Russia by 1C Company, on December 15, 2006, and in Australia by N3V Games, on June 21, 2007. It was first re-released in Poland as a compilation, alongside the original Kao the Kangaroo and Kao the Kangaroo: Round 2, in a collection called The World of Kao the Kangaroo (Note: Polish: Świat Kangurka Kao) on November 17, 2006. Years later, alongside the two aforementioned instalments of the series, it was added to GOG.com on February 15, 2021, and on April 27, 2023, on Steam.

== Reception ==
Reception

Review scores
Publication	Score
GRY-Online.pl	6/10
CD-Action	7/10'
Imperium Gier	8/10
Igromania	5/10

Kao the Kangaroo: Mystery of the Volcano received mixed reviews upon release. Daniel Kazek of Gry-Online praised the graphics and difficulty but criticized its camera and short length.

== Legacy ==
Kao the Kangaroo: Mystery of the Volcano was the last game in Kao the Kangaroo series following its release, until the release the reboot, Kao the Kangaroo (2022 video game) in May 27, 2022. In April 2026, a group of fans released an expansion modification to the Mystery of the Volcano titled Kao the Kangaroo: Resurgence of the Volcano. (Note: Polish: Kangurek Kao: Przebudzenie Wulkanu) It enhances visuals, adds gameplay elements, alongwith other features such as NPCs.
