= Knights of Honor (video game) =

2004 video game

- Developer: Black Sea Studios
- Publishers: EU: Sunflowers Interactive; NA: Paradox Interactive; AU: Atari
- Designer: Vesselin Handjiev
- Programmer: Panayot Vaniozdravov Yanazov
- Artist: Rossen Manchev
- Composer: Borislav "Glorian" Slavov
- Platform: Microsoft Windows
- Release: EU: September 30, 2004; NA: May 10, 2005; AU: August 3, 2005
- Genre: Real-time strategy
- Modes: Single-player, multiplayer

Knights of Honor is a real-time strategy (RTS) game developed by Bulgarian Black Sea Studios. It was published by Sunflowers Interactive in Europe in 2004 and Paradox Interactive in North America in 2005. The game takes place in Medieval Europe, spanning the early centuries of the second millennium in three historical time periods. The player can choose to play as one of over 100 playable kingdoms. A sequel, Knights of Honor II: Sovereign, was released in 2022.

== Gameplay ==
Knights of Honor is played on a large map of Europe spanning from Ireland to Caucasus and from Scandinavia to the northern coast of Africa. The map is divided into parcels of land called provinces. Each province is governed by a city and contains several "Rural Areas" which can be towns, farms, monasteries and coast towns. These rural areas can't be altered and are placed randomly across the map before each game. The city, however has room for several buildings which can give bonuses to the rural areas or the city itself, such as more piety in the monasteries when a church is built or a higher income from the towns when a market is present in the city. Other buildings are needed to recruit certain units (such as a swordsmith for sword-wielding units or a fletcher for bow-wielding units) or to defend the city such as walls and towers. A city only has limited room for buildings. Thus, not all buildings can be built in a city and the player must carefully consider what to build for a particular city. Compared to other strategy games, building structures in KOH takes a rather long time. The main goal of the game is to become emperor of Europe. However, the player is free to do whatever they wish. There is no set time limit.

=== Resources ===
There are three kinds of resources which can be spent on a variety of upgrades. Money is needed to recruits units, build buildings, etc. It is earned by taxes, trading and kingdom power. Piety is used for increasing your kingdom power and converting provinces to your religion. Books are used to educate your knights and adopting provinces. Towns themselves also generate hammers (used to construct certain buildings), food which determines how long they can withstand sieges, and peasants which are required to recruit units.

=== Religion ===
Religion plays an important role in Knights of Honor. There are 4 different types of religion: The Catholic Church, The Orthodox Church, Islam, and Paganism. The catholic Pope has much influence in medieval Europe. He can excommunicate catholic kingdoms and call for crusades against non-catholic kingdoms. When a player chooses to go on a crusade they are granted powerful Crusader units. When the Pope dies, his successor is chosen among several clerics throughout Europe. If the player happens to have a very experienced cleric, there is a chance he will be chosen as Pope. From then on, the player controls the Pope and can choose to excommunicate kingdoms and call for crusades, a successful crusade can result in a puppet state that is unquestionably loyal to the leader of the crusade or plunder the town for a huge sum of gold. The Catholic Church is located in Western Europe and the Mediterranean. Orthodox factions are located in south east Europe and answer to Byzantia. These factions can declare independence and form their own churches which grants them a greater sum of gold while lacking the disadvantage of being excommunicated which results in a gold penalty. Islamic empires have the ability to call a Jihad which is similar to a Crusade and will cause armies to spawn at their borders and attack any invaders or rebels. This is a powerful ability but it has a long cool down period. Islam is found in north Africa and the middle east. Paganism is the smallest religion being found only in Scandinavia and some parts of eastern Europe. Pagans do not collect piety (a religious resource used to build certain units and buildings and perform some diplomatic options) so are free to focus on gold and are not troubled by religious problems such as religious tension but they have a penalty on their income and have bad relations with all other religions. Paganism is the only religion the player or other kingdoms cannot convert to, the only way to play as a pagan nation is to start the game as one. The player can renounce his faith and adopt another official religion (except paganism) but such religious conflict will often split the kingdom up and one must reunify the nations as a result.

=== Trade and exotic goods ===
Provinces can have up to three attributes called "province features" which allow the construction of certain buildings. For instance if a province contains fertile soil, an apiary can be built in that province. These buildings give access to "trade goods" which have a number of positive effects on the kingdom. For example, horses allows mounted units, wine makes a population happier and silver brings in extra money. Controlling such provinces is the key to success in Knights of Honor. Besides trade goods, which can be obtained in provinces where the right province features are present or by importing them from other kingdoms, there is another type of goods called "exotic goods". These goods can't be produced within a province but have to be imported by means of an admiralty, the upgraded version of a harbour. Examples are ivory, gems and spices. Exotic goods, together with trade goods, are needed to activate so called "kingdom advantages". There are ten different kingdom advantages each requiring a different set of trade and exotic goods and each giving a different advantage. For instance, the kingdom advantage "Secret Order", which gives a bonus to spies, requires the following trade goods: columns, statues, silver and dyes and the following exotic goods: ebony and ivory.

Controlling many provinces certainly gives an advantage over other kingdoms not only because of more income but also because of the goods and eventually the kingdom advantages. However, larger kingdoms are harder to maintain and defend.

== Release ==
In 2003, the game was scheduled for release in the second quarter of 2004. In January 2004, a Japanese release by Zoo Corporation was announced. In April 2004, Electronic Arts announced distribution deal for the European release. The North American release was delayed to May 2005.

== Modding ==
A large community of modders created a lot of content for the game, though nowadays almost all has been lost in the closure of Sunflowers/Black Sea Studios Website. But some mods have been restored and have been recently developed thanks to the nostalgia of some players. One of them has created a mod which allow to play on new monitor resolution such as Full HD - 1920x1080 and 1366x768p. It adds many new content and tweaks.

== Reception ==
Reception

Aggregate score
Aggregator	Score
GameRankings	77%

Review scores
Publication	Score
1Up.com	C+
Computer Gaming World	4/5
GameSpot	8.0/10
GameSpy	4/5

Knights of Honor received generally positive reviews upon its release. It holds an average of 77% on aggregate website GameRankings.

Denny Atkin of Computer Gaming World said that "Though the individual ingredients don't stand out, Knights of Honor comes together as a tasty stew. It's engaging, entertaining, and challenging, and it's sure to bring a smile to your inner world conqueror."

Di Luo of 1UP.com said that "As an entry level strategy game Knights of Honor appeals due to its low learning curve and varied gameplay. For veterans of more complex games, however, it's more flash than substance."

== Sequel ==
In 2019, a sequel titled Knights of Honor II: Sovereign was announced, to be developed by Black Sea Games, consisting of former Black Sea Studios employees who worked on the original game, and published by THQ Nordic. The game was released on December 6, 2022. It received positive reviews from critics.
