= King's Bounty: Dark Side =

2014 video game

- Front cover of the retail box of the game
- Developer: 1C-Softclub
- Publisher: 1C Company
- Series: King's Bounty
- Engine: TheEngine
- Platform: Microsoft Windows
- Release: WW: August 14, 2014
- Genre: Tactical role-playing
- Mode: Single-player

King's Bounty: Dark Side (Russian: King's Bounty: Тёмная сторона) is a strategy video game developed for Microsoft Windows by 1C-Softclub and published by 1C Company. The game was released on August 14, 2014. It is a standalone installment in the King's Bounty series.

== Gameplay ==
King's Bounty: Dark Side maintains many of the same game conventions used in previous installments. The game is strategy-based with RPG elements. Unlike previous games, the protagonists in the game belong to orcish, vampire, and demon races which are the antagonistic races in other installments. The game lets the player play as one of the characters from the three protagonists, the orc Bagyr, who is a warrior, the vampire Daert, who is a mage, and the demoness Neoline, who belongs to the paladin class. Players have access to an overworld map they can click on to move around. Sometimes they will stumble onto buried treasures, other times the loot will be out in the open. Players can find huts or villages where they can buy and sell items or units. The players can receive quests from various NPCs in the world and upon their completion they are rewarded either experience, loot or both. Also on these maps are enemy creatures. Most of the time when they see the character, they start to chase them down and if they come into contact with player's character, a battle ensues. The character does not participate directly in the combat. Instead the players have units of differing types that they can deploy. Almost all of them have their own strengths and weaknesses, special abilities and ranges of movement. Some characters rely on ranged attacks, others attempt to deal direct damage, some units have supportive capabilities and all of them are viable parts of the combat strategy for example imps can use fireballs and melee attacks. When a unit runs out of troops the unit is destroyed. If all the units are destroyed the game is lost. The more troops the character has, the higher the hit points and damage output of their army is. Players can use a magic spell or scrolls to cast magic on the field of battle. These can be attack or buffing spells. Each of the three characters also has an exclusive companion that uses the rage they build up in combat. There are oftentimes objects on the battlefield such as traps or treasure chests. Experience points from battles go towards leveling up, which increases core abilities like the attack-powering rage and the magic-powering mana. The players also earn and collect might, mind, and magic runes that are used to purchase various arcane talents on extensive skill trees. As in earlier games in the series, the story plays out over a number of islands that players gradually explore and conquer for faction.

== Plot ==
All three protagonists have different backstories. After the orcs lost the battle at Tristerm, the Elves started plundering their villages, desecrating their shrines, and killing their people. Bagyr, a famous Orc warrior, was forced to flee along with a small group of elite Orc warriors in order to save themselves from the Elves. Human armies invaded Atrixus in which Neoline's father was killed which left her as the ruler of demons. Together with a small unit of demon survivors, she fought the human warriors and fled through a catacomb into Draganador, the land of the dwarves. While the castle of the Morton vampire clan is being besieged by vampire hunters, the young vampire mage Daert leaves his home to seek allies among other dark races that are on the verge of extinction. The three of them meet at an inn in Draganador, but when they do a blood oath of friendship the innkeeper mistakes it for dark wizardry and the dwarves attack them, thus violating their years-long neutrality. The protagonists flee through the Black Gate into the Shelter and free the Spirit of Darkness, thus starting their quest to defeat the Spirit of Light.

== Development ==
1C Company announced the game and its details in April 2014. Initially released on Steam as Early Access version on May 16, the game was released three months later on August 14. A Premium Edition of the game includes more quests and locations along with a bonus amulet that increases leveling speed. Those who entered the Early Access of the game automatically received the premium edition. The retail box of the premium edition was published by Excalibur Publishing in United Kingdom, Scandinavian countries, Australasia and South Africa.

== Reception ==
Reception

Aggregate scores
Aggregator	Score
GameRankings	71%
Metacritic	73/100

Review scores
Publication	Score
GameSpot	8/10
4players	77/100
GameStar	68/100
IGN Italia	7.1/10

The game holds a score of 73/100 based on 13 reviews on Metacritic and an aggregate of 71% on GameRankings based on 5 reviews. It was given a score of 8/10 by Brett Todd of GameSpot, praising the game for its gameplay and soundtrack. Eike Cramer of 4players gave it a score of 77/100, praising it for allowing players to play as the usually antagonistic races from the series. Rüdiger Steidle of GameStar gave it a review score of 68/100 and criticised it for offering nothing fresh when compared to the previous games of the series. Claudio Chianese gave it a review score of 7.1/10, saying the game was made for both the old fans and new players of the series.

== See also ==
- List of PC games
- 2014 in video gaming
